= List of Muslim Other Backward Classes communities in India =

This is a full list of Muslim communities in India (OBCs) that are recognised in India's Constitution as Other Backward Class, a term used to classify socially and educationally disadvantaged classes.

== Andhra Pradesh and Telangana ==
=== Central list ===
Below is a list of Muslim communities that have been accorded Other Backward Classes status by the Government of India in the state of Andhra Pradesh and Telangana.

Entry number	Caste/community	Resolution no. and date
*37	Mehtar	12011/68/93-BCC(C) dt. 10 September 1993 and 12011/9/2004-BCC dt. 16 January 2006
*43	Dudekula laddaf or Noorbash (Muslim)	12011/68/93-BCC(C) dt. 10 September 1993
*62	Are Katika, Khatika, Quresh (Muslim butchers)	12011/68/93-BCC(C) dt. 10 September 1993 and 12011/4/2002-BCC dt. 13 January 2004
*33	(Muslim butchers)	12011/68/93-BCC(C) dt. 10 September 93 and 12011/4/2002-BCC dt. 13 January 2004

=== State list ===
Below is a list of Muslim communities that have been accorded Other Backward Classes status by the Government of Andhra Pradesh and Telangana and Karnataka state government.

- 1. Achchukattalavandlu, Singali, Singamvallu, Achchupanivallu, Achchukattuvaru, Achukatlavandlu.
- 2. Attar Saibulu, Attarollu, bukka muslims
- 3. Dhobi Muslim / Muslim Dhobi / Dhobi Musalman, Chakla or Sakala, Turaka Chakali, Tulukka Vannan, Tsakalas, Sakalas or Chakalas, Muslim Rajakas
- 4. Alvi, Alvi, Shah alvi Alvi, Alam, Alvi, Alvi, Darvesh, Shah
- 5. Garadi Muslim, Garadi Saibulu, Pamulavallu, Kani-kattuvallu, Garadollu, Garadiga
- 6. Gosangi Muslim, Phakeer Sayebulu
- 7. Guddi Eluguvallu, Elugu Bantuvallu, Musalman Keelu Gurralavallu
- 8. Hajjam, Nai, Nai Muslim, Navid
- 9. Labbi, Labbai, Labbon, Labba
- 10. Pakeerla, Borewale, Deera Phakirlu, Bonthala
- 11. Qureshi / Qassab, Kureshi / Khureshi, Khasab, Marati Khasab, Muslim Katika, Khatik Muslim
- 12. Siddi, Yaba, Habshi, Jasi
- 13. Turaka Kasha, Kakkukotte Zinka Saibulu, Chakkitakanevale, Terugadu Gontalavaru, Thirugatigantla, Rollaku Kakku Kottevaru, Pattar Phodulu, Chakketakare, Thuraka Kasha
- 14. Other Muslim groups, excluding
  - Patan, Pathan, Pastoon, Khan
    - Mughal, Moghal
    - Momin Ansar, Sheikh or Saudagar
    - Vip
    - Irani
    - Bohara, Bohra
    - Cutchi-Memon
    - Jamayat
    - Navayath
    - Sayed, Sayyad, Syed
    - Chaush, Arab
    - Maniyar

== Assam ==
Below is a list of Muslim communities that have been accorded Other Backward Classes status by the Government of India in the state of Assam.

- 1. Maimal
- 2. Pangal
- 3. Maimal (Sheikh)
- 4. Jolha (Momin And Ansari)
- 5. Maria (M-OBC)
- 6. Dhuniya Muslim (Shaikh Mansuri)

Deshi Muslim are also backward category but they are not recognised as OBC.

== Bihar ==
=== Central list ===
Below is a list of Muslim communities that have been accorded Other Backward Classes status by the Government of India in the state of Bihar.

Entry number	Caste/community	Resolution no. and date
*1.	Ranghar (Muslim rajput) (Decent kurds)	
*2	Abdal(dafali. Shekh hashmi)	12011/68/93-BCC(C) dt. 10 September 1890
*5	Kasab (Kasai) (Muslim)	-do-
*9	Kalandar	12011/68/93-BCC(C) dt. 10.09.9bbbbsss
*16	Omar	12011/68/93-BCC(C) dt. 10 September 1990
*30	Gaddi	-do-
*38	Chik	(Muslim) 12011/68/93-BCC(C) dt. 10 September 93 and 12011/21/95-BCC dt. 15 May 1995
*42	Churihar (Muslim)	(Siddique) -do-
*46	Dafali(abdaal.shekh hashmi)(Muslim)	-do-bhagi
*53	Teli	
*57	Dhobi (Muslim)	-do-
*58	Mansoori/Shaikh Mansuri (Muslim)	-do-
*63	Nat (Muslim)	-do-
*67	Nalband (Muslim)	-do-
*68	Pamaria / Sheikh Abbasi (Muslim)	-do-
*84	Bhathiara (Muslim)	do-
*91	Alvi Shah Faqir Dewan Sain (Muslim)	12011/68/93-BCC(C) dt. 10 September 1993
*92	Mehtar, Lal Begi, (Muslim) Halalkhor, Bhangi	-do-
*93	Miriasin (Muslim)	12011/68/93-BCC(C) dt. 10 September 93 and 12011/21/95-BCC dt. 15 May 1995
*99	Mukri (Mukeri) (Muslim)	-do-
*102	Mirshikar (Muslim)	-do-
*103	Momin / Ansari (Muslim), Ansari Arabi	12011/68/93-BCC( C) dt. 10 September 93 and 12015/15/2008- BCC dt. 16 June 2011 12015/15/2008- BCC dt. 16 June 2011
*109	Rangrez (Muslim)	12011/68/93-BCC(C) dt. 10 September 93 and 12011/21/95-BCC dt. 15 May 1995
*111	Rayeen or Kunjra (Muslim)	-do-
*119	Idrisi or Darzi (Muslim)	12011/68/93-BCC(C) dt. 10 September 93 and 12011/21/95-BCC dt. 15 May 1995
*124b	Kalal, Kalwar, Kalar	-do-
*125	Kulahia	-do-
*126	Shershahbadi	-do-
*129	Saikalgar (Sikligar) (Muslim)	12011/4/2004-BCC dt. 13 January 2004
*130	Bakho (Muslim)	12011/9/2004-BCC dt. 17 January 2006
*131	Pathan (Muslim)	12011/9/2004-BCC dt. 17 January 2006
*132	Sharif	

Notes:

- ^{1} largely a Hindu caste in Bihar with a small Muslim minority known as Turk Telis

=== State list ===
Below is a list of Muslim communities that have been accorded OBC status by the state government of Bihar:

Sl. number	Name of the castes/sub-castes/salmani	Entry number in the Communities Central List
*1	Abdal dafali hashmi	1
*6	Bakho (Muslim)	130
*15	Bhathiara (Muslim)	84
*22	Chik (Muslim)	38
*25	Pathani Manihar	
*26	Dafali (Muslim)	46
*35	Dhobi (Muslim)	57
*36	Mansoori|Shaikh Mansuri]] (Muslim)	58
*37	Gaddi	30
*46	Idrisi or Darzi (Muslim)	119
*50	Kagzi	16
*51	Kalandar	9
*52b	Kalar or Kalal	124b
*56	Kasab (Kasai) (Muslim)	5
*76	Alvi, sayyed (Muslim)	91
*77	Mehtar, Lal Begi, (Muslim) Halalkhor, Bhangi	92
*86	Miriasin (Muslim)	93
*87	Mirshikar (Muslim)	102
*88	Momin (Muslim) Ansari Baniya	103
*89	Sheikh Abbasi	
*109	Rangrez (Muslim)	109
*111	Rayeen or Kunjra (Muslim)	111
*114	Sayee (Muslim)	116
*115	Malik (Muslim)	76
*1126	Shershahbadi	126
*126	Thakurai (Muslim)	131
*131	Saikalgar (Sikligar) (Muslim)	129

== Chhattisgarh ==
Below is a list of Muslim communities that have been accorded Other Backward Classes status by the Government of India in the state of Chhattisgarh.

1. Muslims Dhobi
2. Bhishti-Abbasi
3. Mewati
4. Pinjara, Naddaf, Fakir/Faquir, Behna, Dhunia, Dhunkar, Mansoori
5. Kasai, Kasab, Kassab, Quasab, Qassab, Qassab-Qureshi
6. Mirasi
7. Hajjam (Barber), Nai (Barber), Salmani
8. Julaha-Momin, Julaha-Ansari, Momin-Ansari
9. Luhar, Nagauri Luhar, Saifi, Multani Luhar
10. Tadvi bhil
11. Kasabi/Kisbi
12. Nat Muslim

== Dadra and Nagar Haveli ==
1. Makrani
2. Chippi
3. Vakta puriya

== Delhi ==
=== Central list ===
Below is a list of Muslim communities that have been accorded Other Backward Classes status by the Government of India in Delhi.

Entry number	Caste/community	Resolution no. and date
*1	Mohd Rafi Abbasi village Gasupur baya bugrasi	12011/7/95-BCC dated 24 May 1995
*4	Arain, Rayee, Kunjra	-do-
*11	Bazigar, Nat, Kalandar (excluding those in Sch. Caste)	-do-
*13	Bhat	12011/7/95-BCC dt. 24 May 1995
*14	Bhatiara	-do-
*15	Chak	-do-
*16	Chippi, Tonk, Darzi, (Note: Only Muslim caste in this grouping) Idrishi	12011/7/95-BCC dt. 24 May 1995 and 12011/04/2002-BCC dt. 19 June 2003
*19	Dhobi (Note: Only Muslim Dhobis are in the OBC list; the Hindu section have Scheduled Caste status.) (other than those who are already included in the list of Scheduled Castes of Delhi) Qassar	12011/7/95-BCC dt. 24 May 1995 and 12011/68/98-BCC dt. 27 October 1999
*20	Dhunia, (Note: Mansoori is the preferred self-designation for the Dhunia community) Pinjara, Kandera-Karan, Dhunnewala, Naddaf, Mansoori, Shaikh Mansuri	12011/7/95-BCC dt. 24 May 1995, 12011/7/95-BCC dt. 17 July 1995 and 12011/04/2002-BCC dt. 19 June 2003
*21	Alvi	12011/7/95-BCC dt. 24 May 1995
*22	Gadaria, Gadheri, Gaddi, Garri^{4}	-do-
*23	Ghasiara, Ghosi	-do-
*24	Gujar, Gurjar (Note: largely Hindu community with a small Muslim minority)	-do-
*25	Jogi, Goswami	-do-
*26	Momin Ansar and Ansari	12011/7/95-BCC dt. 24 May 1995, 12011/04/2002-BCC dt. 19 June 2003 and 12015/13/2010-B.C.II dt. 8 December 2011
*28	Kasai, Qassab, Quraishi	-do-
*31	Khatik (excluding those in Scheduled Caste)	-do-
*32	Kumhar, Prajapati (Note: partly Hindu and partly Muslim community)	-do-
*34	Lakhera, Manihar	-do-
*36	Luhar, Bhubhalia, Saifi (Note: The Saifi are Muslim Lohars)	12011/7/95-BCC dt. 24 May 1995 and 12011/68/1998-BCC dt. 27 October 1999
*37	Machi, Machhera (Note: largely Muslim community with a small Hindu minority)	12011/7/95-BCC dt. 24 May 1995
*39	Memar, Raj	-do-
*41	Merasi, Mirasi	-do-
*42	Mochi (Note: Only Muslim Mochis are in the OBC list; the Hindu section have Scheduled Caste status.) (excluding those in Scheduled Caste)	-do-
*43	Nai, Hajjam, Nai (Sabita), Salmani, Chaudhary	12011/7/95-BCC dt. 24 May 1995 and 12011/04/2002-BCC dt. 19 June 2003
*44	Nalband	12011/7/95-BCC dt. 24 May 1995
*45	Naqqal	-do-
*46	Pakhiwara	-do-
*49	Rangrez	-do-
*50	Sunar	-do-

=== State list ===
Below is a list of Muslim communities that have been accorded OBC status by the state government of Delhi.

Entry number	Caste/community
*1	Abbasi, Bhishti, Sakka
*4	Arain, Rayee, Kunjra
*11	Bazigar, Nat, Kalandar (excluding those in Sch. Caste)
*14	Bhatiara
*15	Chak
*16	Chippi, Tonk, Darzi, (Note: Muslim community) Idrishi,Chhimba
*19	Dhobi (Note: Only Muslim Dobhis are in the OBC list; the Hindu section have Scheduled Caste status.) (other than those who are already included in the list of Scheduled Castes of Delhi) Qassar
*20	Mansoori, (Note: Sometimes called Dhunia; Mansoori is now the preferred self-designation) Pinjara, Kandera-Karan, Dhunnewala, Naddaf
*21	Fakir, Alvi (Note: Alvi is now the preferred self-designation of the Faqir community, but not all Alvis are Faqirs.)
*24	Gujar, Gurjar^{5} (Note: Largely Hindu community with a small Muslim minority)
*26	Ansari
*28	Kasai, Qassab, Quraishi
*31	Khatik (excluding those in Sch. Caste)
*32	Kumhar, Prajapati (Note: partly Hindu and partly Muslim community)
*34	Siddique, Khakhora, Manihar
*36	Luhar, Bhubhalia, Saifi (Note: the Saifi are Muslim Lohars)
*37	Machi, Machhera (Note: Largely Muslim community with a small Hindu minority)
*39	Memar, Raj
*40	Mina/ Meena
*41	Merasi, Mirasi
*42	Mochi (excluding those in Sch. Caste) (Note: Only Muslim Mochis are in the OBC list; the Hindu section have Scheduled Caste status.)
*43	Nai, Hajjam, Nai(Sabita), Salmani
*44	Nalband
*45	Naqqal
*46	Pakhiwara
*49	Rangrez
*51	Sunar
*52	Teli
*54	Jat
*60	Meo

== Gujarat ==
=== Central list ===
Below is a list of Muslim communities that have been accorded Other Backward Classes status in Gujarat.

Sl. number	Name of the castes/sub-castes/synonyms	Resolution no. and date
*3	Bafan (Muslim)	-do-
*13	Chunara (Note: Includes a Muslim minority)	-do-
*17	Dafer (Hindu and Muslim)	-do-
*20	Gadhai (Muslim)	-do-
*22	Galiara (Muslim)	12011/68/93-BCC(C) dt. 10 September 1993 and 12011/21/95-BCC dt. 15 May 1995
*23a	Ghanchi (Muslim)	12011/68/93-BCC(C) dated 10 September 1993
*26	Hingora (Muslim)	-do-
*27a	Ansari (Muslim)	12011/21/95-BCC dt. 15 May 1995
*27b	Garana, Tariya Tari (Muslim)	12011/88/98-BCC dt. 6 December 1999
*28	Jat (Muslim)	12011/68/93-BCC(C) dt. 10 September 1993
*32	Khatki or Kasai Chamadia Khatki Halari Khatki (all Muslim)	-do-
*35	Kharwa-Bhadela	-do-
*40	Mir Dhadhi, Langha, Mirasi (all Muslim)	-do-
*43	Majothi, Darbar, kumbhar(Muslim)	-do-
*45	Matwa or Matwa-Kureshi (Muslim), Gavli (Hindu)	-do-
*46	Me or Meta	-do-
*49	Miyana, Miana (Muslim)	-do-
*54	Pinjara, Ghanchi-Pinjara and Mansuri-Pinjara (all Muslim)	-do-
*59	Sandhi (Muslim)	12011/68/93-BCC(C) dt. 10 September 1993
*64	Siddi (where they are not Scheduled Tribes)	-do-
*65	Sipahi, Patni Jamat and Turk Jamat (all Muslim)	-do-
*70	Theba (Muslim)	-do-
*73b	Hajjam (Muslim), Khalipha (Muslim), Babar (Hindu)	12011/44/96-BCC dated 6 December 1996
*76	Vanzara and Kangsiwala (Hindu) and Vanzara (Muslim) of Dangs district only	-do-
*78	Wagher (Hindu and Muslim)	12011/68/93-BCC(C) dated 10 September 1993
*80	Pakhaali (Note: The Pakhaali are known as Bhishti elsewhere in India)	12011/44/96-BCC dated 6 December 1999
*82b	Baghban, Rayeen	12011/36/99-BCC dated 4 April 2000
*91	Luhar/Lohar/Panchal (Note: Partly Muslim)	-do-
*96	Bharbhunja	12011/36/99-BCC dated 4 April 2000
*97	Chhipa (Note: Largely Muslim)	12015/9/2000-BCC dated 6 September 2001
*101	Arab (Muslim)	12015/15/2008-BCC dated 16 June 2011
*103	Somra, sumra (Muslim) '	-do-

== Haryana ==
=== Central list ===
Below is a list of Muslim communities that have been accorded Other Backward Classes status by the Government of India in Haryana.

Entry number	Caste/community	Resolution no. and date
*10	Bhat, (Note: Includes a Muslim minority) Bhatra, Darpi, Ramaiya	12015/36/1999-BCC dt. 4 April 2000 and 12015/9/2000-BCC dt. 6 September 2001
*12	Changar	-do-
*17	Dhobi	-do-
*19	Dhimar, Mallah, Kashyap-Rajpoot, Kahar, Jhinwar or Jhiwar, Dhiwar, Khewat, Mehra, Nishad, Sakka, Bhisti, Sheikh-Abbasi	12011/68/93-BCC(C) dt. 10 September 1993, 12011/68/98-BCC dt. 27 October 1999 and 12015/2/2007-BCC dt. 18 August 2010
*21	Faquir	12011/68/93-BCC(C)dt. 10 September 1993
*24	Ghasi, Ghasiara or Ghosi (Note: Muslim community)	12011/68/93-BCC(C) dt. 10 September 1993 and 12011/21/95-BCC dt. 15 May 1995
*29	Hajjam, Nai, Nais, Sain, Salmani	12011/68/93-BCC(C) t. 10 September 1993, 12011/68/98-BCC t. 27 October 1999 and 12015/2/2007-BCC dt. 18 August 2010
*32	Kanjar or Kanchan	12011/68/93-BCC(C) dt. 10 September 1993
*35	Kamboj	-do-
*39	Lakhera rajpoot, Manihar siddiqui, Kacheratomar	12011/68/93-BCC(C) dt. 10 September 1993 and 12015/2/2007-BCC dt. 18 August 2010
*40	Lohar or Luhar, Saifi, (Note: The Saifi are Muslim Lohar) Panchal^{9}	12011/68/93-BCC(C) dt. 10 September 1993, 12011/68/98-BCC dt. 27 October 1999 and 12011/44/99-BCC dt. 21 September 2000
*41	Madari	12011/68/93-BCC(C) dt. 10 September 1993
*42	Mochi (excluding those who are included in Scheduled Castes) (Note: Only Muslims are in the OBC list; the Hindu section have Scheduled Caste status.)	-do-
*43	Mirasi	12011/68/93-BCC(C) dt. 10 September 1993
*46	Nalband	12011/68/93-BCC(C)dt. 10 September 1993
*47	Pinja, Penja	12011/68/93-BCC(C) dt. 10 September 1993
*53	Singlikant or Singikant, Singiwala (Note: Partly Muslim)	12011/68/93-BCC(C) dt. 10 September 1993 and 12011/21/95-BCC dt. 15 May 1995
*54	Sunar, Zaragar, Soni (Note: The Zaragar Muslim Sonar)	12011/68/93-BCC(C) dt. 10 September 1993 and 12011/44/99-BCC dt. 21 September 2000
*56	Teli (Note: The Haryana Teli are almost entirely Muslim)	-do-
*57	Vanzara, Banzara, Banjara (Note: Partly Muslim) or Vanjara	12011/68/93-BCC(C) dt. 10 September 1993 and 12015/2/2007-BCC dt. 18 August 2010
*61	Nat (other than those who are already included in the List of Scheduled Castes for Haryana)	12011/44/96-BCC dt. 6 December 1996
*67	Meo	12011/44/96-BCC dt. 6 December 1996
*68	Gujjar	-do-
*71	Rangrez, Nilgar, Leelgar, Lallari, Mansuri	-do-
*73	Soni (Dawala), Nyaria	12011/36/99-BCCdt. 4 April 2000 and 12015/9/2000-BCCdt. 6 September 2001
*74	Momin Ansari^{18}	12015/36/1999-BCC dt. 4 April 2000 and 12015/9/2000-BCC dt. 6 September 2001

== Himachal Pradesh ==
This is a list of Muslim communities that have been accorded Other Backward Classes status in the state of Himachal Pradesh, India.

Entry number	Caste/community	Resolution no. and date
*13	Changar	-do-
*18	Faquir	-do-
*26	Hajjam, (Note: The Hajjam are Muslim Nai.) Nai^{1}	-do-, 12015/2/2007-BCC dt. 18 August 2010
*30	Kumhar, Prajapati, Kumbar, Ghumar, Ghumhar (Note: The Ghumar are Punjabi speaking Muslim Kumhar.)	-do-, 12015/2/2007-BCC dt. 18 August 2010
*32	Kanjar, (Note: Includes a Muslim minority) Kanchan	-do-
*36	Madari	-do-
*37	Mirasi	-do-
*41	Nalband	-do-
*43	Pinja or Penja, Panja, Nadaf, Nadaaf	-do- and 12015/2/2007-BCC dt. 18 August 2010
*48	Gujjar or Gujar (in merged areas only) (Note: Most Muslim Gujjar in Himachal Pradesh have Scheduled Tribe status.)	12011/68/93-BCC(C) dt. 10 September 1993 and 12011/21/95-BCC dt. 15 May 1995
*49	Julaha (Note: The Julaha are Muslim; most Himachal Pradesh Julaha are Kabirpanth.)	12015/36/1999-BCC dt. 4 April 2000 and 12015/9/2000-BCC dt. 6 September 2001

Notes:

- The Muslim Mallah caste are included in the OBC state list.

== Jammu and Kashmir ==
This is a list of Muslim communities that have been granted Other Backward Classes status by the Government of India in the state of Jammu and Kashmir, India.

Entry number	Caste/community	Resolution no. and date
*1	Bahach Hanjie and Shikara Wallas (excluding house-boat owners)	12011/7/95-BCC dated 24 April 1995
*3	Hajam (barbers) (rural only)	-do-
*4	Bhand	-do-
*5	Dambali Faqir	-do-
*6	Doom (excluding those in Scheduled Castes)	-do-
*7	Fishermen including Gada Hanz	-do-
*10	Kulfaqir	-do-
*11	Kumhar, Kumahar (village potters)	-do-
*12	Madari, Bazigar	-do-
*13	Mirasi	-do-
*15	Shaksaz	-do-
*16	Shoe-repairers (working without the aid of machines)	-do-
*17	Shupri Wattal (excluding those in Sch. Caste)	-do-
*19	Teli, Teeli (Note: largely Hindu community with a small Muslim minority)	-do-
*20	Village washermen	-do-
*21	Lohar, Tarkhan	12015/9/2000-BCC dated 6 September 2001
*24	sheer GOJRIE, Lohar,	12011/6/2014-BCC dated 7 December 2016

== Kerala ==
- Mappila Muslims
- Maniyar muslim

== Madhya Pradesh ==
=== Central list ===
Below is a list of Muslim communities that have been accorded OBC status by the Government of India in the state of Madhya Pradesh.

Entry number	Caste/community	Resolution no. and date
*59	Islamic groups	
*1	Rangrej	12011/68/93-BCC(C) dt. 10 September 1993
*2	Bhisthi, Bhishti-Abbasi	12011/68/93-BCC(C) dt. 10 September 1993 12011/21/1995-BCC dt. 15 May 1995 and 12011/36/99-BCC dt. 4 April 2000
*3	Chippa/Chhipa	12011/68/93-BCC(C) dt. 10 September 1993
*4	Hela	12011/68/93-BCC(C) dt. 10 September 1993 and 12011/21/95-BCC dt. 15 May 1995
*5	Bhatiyara	12011/68/93-BCC(C) dt. 10 September 1993
*6	Dhobi	-do-
*7	Mewati, Meo	12011/68/93-BCC(C) dt. 10 September 1993 and 12011/68/98-BCC dt. 27 October 1999
*8	Pinjara, Naddaf, Fakir/Faquir, Dhuniya, Dhunkar, Mansoori	12011/68/93-BCC(C) dt. 10 September 1993, 12011/21/95-BCC dt. 15 May 1995 and 12011/88/98
*9	Kunjara, Raine/rayeen, Bagwan	12011/68/93-BCC(C) dt. 10 September 1993 and 12011/68/98-BCC dt. 27 October 1999
*10	Manihar	12011/68/93-BCC(C) dt. 10 September 1993 and 12011/21/1995-BCC dt. 15 May 1995
*11	Kasai, Kasab, Kassab Qussab, Qassab-Qurreshi	12011/68/93-BCC(C) dt. 10 September 1993, 12011/21/95-BCC dt. 15 May 1995 and 12011/36/99-BCC dt. 4 April 2000
*12	Mirasi	12011/68/93-BCC(C) dt. 10 September 1993
*13	Barhai (carpenter)	-do-
*14	Hajjam(Barber), Nai (barber), Salmani	12011/68/93-BCC(C) dt. 10 September 1993, 12011/21/95-BCC dt. 15 May 1995, 12011/68/98-BCC dt. 27 October 1999 and 12011/88/98-BCC dt. 6 December 1999
*15	Momin Ansari	12011/68/93-BCC(C) dt. 10 September 1993, 12011/21/1995-BCC dt. 15 May 1995, 12011/36/99-BCC dt. 4 April 2000 and 12015/9/2000-BCC dt. 6 September 2001
*16	Luhar, Saifi, Nagauri Luhar, Multani Luhar	12011/68/93-BCC(C) dt. 10 September 1993, 12011/68/98-BCC dt. 27 October 1999 and 12011/36/99-BCC dt. 4 April 2000
*17	Tadavi	12011/68/93-BCC(C) dt. 10 September 1993
*18	Banjara, Mukeri, Makrani	12011/68/93-BCC(C) dt. 10 September 1993 and 12011/44/99-BCC dt. 21 September 2000
*19	Mochi	12011/68/93-BCC(C) dt. 10 September 1993
*20	Teli, Nayata, Pindari (Pindara)	-do- and 12011/21/1995-BCC dt. 15 May 1995
*21	Kalaigar	12011/88/98-BCC dt. 6 December 1999
*22	Pemdi	-do-
*23	Nalband	-do-
*24	Mirdha (excluding Jat Muslims)	12011/88/98-BCC dt. 6 December 1999
*25	Nat (other than those included in the SC list)	12011/36/99-BCC dt. 4 April 2000
*26	Niyargar, Niyargar-Multani Niyaria	12011/36/99-BCC dt. 4 April 2000
*27	Gaddi	-do-

- 2. Attar
- 3. Bagwan
- 4. Chhaparband
- 5. Dhawad
- 6. Darwesi
- 7. Fakir Bhandarwala
- 8. Gavandi
- 9. Gavil Muslim
- 10. Khateek
- 11. Mansoori
- 12. Muslim Madari
- 13. Nalba
- 14. Naqqash
- 15. Nilgar
- 16. Pan Faroshs
- 17. Putligar
- 18. Sanpagarudi
- 19. Qassab
- 20. Muslim Teli
- 21. Muslim Maniyar, Manyar, Bangdiwala, Caste No. 309
- 22. Mujawar dafali, Caste No. 339
- 23. Tamboli
- 24. Muslim Beldar, Caste No. 330
- 25. Momin Ansari
- 26. Muslim Teli sSamaj

== Maharashtra ==
Below is a list of Muslim communities that have been accorded Other Backward Classes status by the Government of India in the state of Maharashtra.

1. Muslim Gawli
2. Julaha, Momin, Julaha-Ansari, Momin-Ansari
3. Naqashi/Naqqashi
4. Rangari, Rangrez
5. Pinjara/Pinjari, Mansoori, Nadaff
6. Billala
7. Momin
8. Fakir Bhandarwala, Fakir
9. Gadsahi
10. Chhapparband Muslims
11. Muslim Beldar
12. Sekkalgar (Muslim)
13. Khatik (Muslim), Kasai, Kasai-Qureshi, Qureshi, Kasab
14. Muslim Madari
15. Bhatiara (Muslim)
16. Attar
17. Darwesi, Vaghwale-Shah (Muslim Religion), Aashwalwale
18. Muslim Manyar (Bangadeewala), Maniyaar or Maneri
19. Mulana, Mulani, Mulane
20. Mujawar
21. Muslim Religion Bhangi/ Mehtar/ Lalbeg/ Halalkhor/ Khakrob, the members of which are actually in the Safai Karamchari profession

== Manipur ==
Below is a list of Muslim communities that have been accorded Other Backward Classes status by the Government of India in the state of Manipur.

1. Pangal

== Punjab ==
Below is a list of Muslim communities granted OBC status in the Government of India in the state of Punjab.

Entry number	Caste/community	Resolution no. and date
*4	Changar	12011/9/1994-BCC dated 10 September 1993
*8	Kanjar or Kanchan (Note: Largely Hindu community with a small Muslim minority)	-do-
*20	Kumhar / Ghumiar, (Note: The Ghumiar are Punjabi speaking Muslim Kumhars.) Prajapati / Parjapatra	12011/9/1994-BCC dt. 10 September 1993, 12011/21/95-BCC dt. 15 May 1995 and 12011/4/2002-BCC dt. 13 January 2004
*23	Kamboh (Note: largely Hindu community with a small Muslim minority in Malerkotla)	-do-
	Sayed	12011/9/1994-BCC dt. 10 September 1993 and 12011/21/95-BCC dt. 15 May 1995
*41	Hajjam, Nai (Note: The Hajjam are Muslim Nais.)	12011/9/1994-BCC dt. 10 September 1993
*48		12011/9/1994-BCC dt. 10 September 1993 and 12011/21/95-BCC dt. 15 May 1995
*50	Madari	-do-
*51	Lohar, Saifi, (Note: The Saifis are Muslim Lohar.) Ramgarhia Turkhan (removed from here and now included with Entry No. 40)^{5}	12011/68/98-BCC dt. 27 October 1999
*52	Mochi (other than Scheduled Castes) (Note: Only Muslim Mochis are on the OBC list; the Hindu and Sikh section have Scheduled Caste status.)	12011/9/1994-BCC dt. 10 September 1993
*53	Mirasi	-do-
*55	Nalband	-do-
*57	Pinja, Penja	12011/9/1994-BCC dt. 10 September 1993 and 12011/21/95-BCC dt. 15 May 1995
*60	Teli	-do-
*62	Gujjar (Note: largely Hindu community with a small minority of Muslim nomadic Gujjars)	12011/9/1994-BCC dt. 10 September 1993

== Rajasthan ==
=== Central list ===
This is a list of Muslim communities who have been granted Other Backward Class status by the Government of India in the state of Rajasthan.

Entry number	Caste/community	Resolution no. and date
*3	Badhai, (Note: largely Hindu with a small Muslim minority) Jangid, Khati, Kharadi, Suthar, Tarkhan	12011/9/94-BCC dt. 19 October 1994 and 12011/68/98-BCC dt. 27 October 1999
*5	Banjara, (Note: includes a Muslim minority) Baladia, Labana	-do-
*6	Bharbhunja	-do-
*8	Chhipa (Chhipi), (Note: Muslim community) Nama, Bhavsar	12011/9/94-BCC dt. 19 October 1994 and 12011/88/98-BCC dt. 6 December 1999
*12	(darzi)	
*14	Dhivar, Kahar, Bhoi, Sagarvanshi-Mali, Keer, Mallah, Mehra, Nishad, Bhisti	12011/9/94- BCC dt. 19 October 1994 12015/15/2008- BCC dt. 16 June 2011
*15	Gaderia(Gadri), Ghosi (Gvala), Gaddi, Gayri	12011/9/94-BCC dt. 19 October 1994 12011/36/99-BCC dt. 4 April 2000 12015/9/2000-BCC dt. 6 September 2001 12015/15/2008- BCC dt. 16 June 2011
*17	Ghanchi	-do-
*19	Gujjar (Note: Partly Muslim)	-do-
*20	Hela (Note: Only Muslims in this community are in the OBC list; the Hindu section have Scheduled Caste status.)	-do-
*22	Jogi, Nath	12011/9/94-BCC dt. 19 October 1994
*23	Julaha (Hindu and Muslim)	-do-
*27	Kandera, Pinjara, Mansoori	12011/9/94-BCC dt. 19 October 1994 and 12011/68/98-BCC dt. 27 October 1999
*30a	Kumhar	12011/9/94-BCC dt. 19 October 1994
*31	Manihar	12011/9/94-BCC dt. 19 October 1994 and 12011/68/98-BCC dt. 27 October 1999
*33	Lohar, Panchal	12011/9/94-BCC dt. 19 October 1994
*35	daar (Muslim) Mali, Bagwan, (Note: The Bagwan are Muslim Mali) Rayee/Rayeen, Kunjra	12011/9/94-BCC dt. 19 October 1994, 12011/68/98-BCC dt. 27 October 1999 and 12011/36/99-BCC dt. 4 April 2000
*36	Mer (Mehrat-Kathat, Mehrat-Ghodat, Cheeta)	12011/9/94-BCC dt. 19 October 1994
*37	kanchan Mirasi, kanchan, Dhadi	-do-
*39	Nai, Sain, Baid Nai	12011/9/94-BCC dt. 19 October 1994 and 12011/88/98-BCC dt. 6 December 1999
*40	kheldar (Muslim)	12011/9/94-BCC dt. 19 October 1994 kheldar caste central government kheldar caste belong to rajasthan state
*53	Sakka-Bhishti, Saqqa-Bhishti, Bhishti-Abbasi	12011/68/98-BCC dated 27 October 1999
*54	Mochi (other than those who are included in the List of Scheduled Castes for Rajasthan)	-do-
*55	Dhobi (other than those who are included in the List of Scheduled Castes for Rajasthan)	12011/68/98-BCC dt. 27 October 1999
*56	Rangrez, Nilgar	-do-
*57	Chungar	-do-
*58	Jat (1.except in Bharatpur and Dhaulpur Districts)	-do-
*60	Faqir / Faquir (Kadiris Chistis and Naqshbandias are not included)	-do-
*61	Qassab	12011/36/99-BCC dated 4 April 2000
*62	Silawat (except Sompura Murtikar)	12011/4/2002-BCC dated 19 June 2003
*64	Bhatiara	-do-
*66	Mev	12015/15/2008- BCC dated 16 June 2011
*67	Sindhi Musalman	12015/15/2008- BCC dated 16 June 2011
*68	Deshwali	12015/15/2008- BCC dated 16 June 2011

Notes:

Explanation: In the above list for the State of Rajasthan, all castes, which are known by the name of their respective traditional hereditary occupations and whose members follow different religions, include all members of those castes, irrespective of whether they follow the Hindu religion or Islam or any other religion (Vide Resolution No. 12011/4/2002-BCC dt. 19 June 2003).

=== State list ===
This is a list of Muslim communities accorded OBC status by the state government of Rajasthan, India.

Entry number	Caste/community
*5	Banjara, Baladia, Labana^{1}
*6	Badhai, Jangid, Khati, Kharadi, Suthar, Tarkhan^{2}
*7	Bharbhunja^{3}
*8	Chhipa (Chhipi), Nama, Bhavsar^{4}
*12	((darzi))
*15	Gaderia(Gadri), Gayri, Ghosi (Gvala)^{5}
*17	Ghanchi
*20	Gujjar^{6}
*21	Hela ^{7}
*23	Julaha
*27	Kandera, Pinjara^{8}
*28	KALBI
*31	Kumhar (Prajapati), Kumawat, Suara, Moyla ^{9}
*32	^{10}
*34	Lohar, Panchal
*35	Maha-Brahman (Acharai), Fakir^{11} (working in Kabristan)
*36	Mali, Bagwan^{12}
*37	Mer (Mehrat-Kathat, Mehrat-Ghodat, Cheeta)^{13}
*38	Mirasi, Dhadi, Langa/Mangniyar
*40	Nai, Sain, Sen, Vednai^{14}
*41	Nyaria (Nyargar)
*54	Jat
*56	Halali, Kasai
*61	Mev
*62	Gaddee
*63	Farooki Bhatiyara
*64	Silawat (other than Sompura and Murtikaar)
*66	Dhobi (Muslim)^{15}
*67	Kayamkhani
*68	Kunjada, Raen
*69	Sapera (Non Hindu Caste)^{16}
*70	Madari, Bazigar (non-Hindu Caste)
*71	Nut (non-Hindu Caste)^{17}
*73	Sindhi Musalman
*74	Kheldar
*75	Chungar
*76	Rath
*77	Multanies
*78	Orphan Children^{18}
*79	Mochi (non-Hindu caste)^{19}
*80	Deshwali
*82	Chobdaar
*84	Bisayati

Notes:

- ^{1} largely Hindu community with a small Muslim minority
- ^{2} The Suthar include a small Muslim minority.
- ^{3} The Bharbhunja include a small Muslim minority.
- ^{4} The Chhipa are Muslim.
- ^{5} The Ghosi are Muslim.
- ^{6} The Gujjar are only partly Muslim.
- ^{7} Only Muslim Bhangis such as the Hela are in the OBC list; the Hindu sections have Scheduled Caste status.
- ^{8} The Kandera are partly Muslim, while the Pinjara are eniterely Muslim.
- ^{9} The Muslim Kumhar are now added as Moyla.
- ^{10} The Manihar are Muslim.
- ^{11} The Faqir are Muslim.
- ^{12} The Bagwan are Muslim Mali.
- ^{13} The Merat and Cheetahs are Muslims
- ^{14} The Nai are partly Muslim
- ^{15} Only Muslim Dhobis are in the OBC list; the Hindu section have Scheduled Caste status.
- ^{16} Only Muslim Sapera are in the OBC list; the Hindu section have Scheduled Caste status.
- ^{17} Only Muslim Nat are in the OBC list; the Hindu section have Scheduled Caste status.
- ^{18} includes Muslims
- ^{19} Only Muslim Mochis are in the OBC list; the Hindu section have Scheduled Caste status.

== Tamil Nadu ==
- Tamil Muslim (Rowther, Labbai and Marakayar)

== Tripura ==
Below is a list of Muslim communities that have been accorded Other Backward Classes status by the Government of India in the state of Tripura.

1. Pangal
2. Teli

== Uttar Pradesh ==
=== Central list ===
Below is a list of Muslim communities that have been accorded Other Backward Classes status in Uttar Pradesh.

Entry number	Caste/community	Resolution no. and date
*4	Kahar, p^{1}	12011/68/93-BCC(C) dt. 10 September 1993 and 12011/36/99-BCC dt. 4 April 2000
*5	Kewat or Mallah^{2}	12011/68/93-BCC(C) dt. 10 September 1993
*8	Kumhar, Prajapati^{3}	12011/68/93-BCC(C) dt. 10 September 1993 and 12011/21/95-BCC dt. 15 May 1995
*10	Kasgar	12011/68/93-BCC(C) dt. 10 September 1993
*11	Kunjra or Rayeen	12011/68/93-BCC(C) dt. 10 September 1993 and 12011/21/95-BCC dt. 15 May 1995
*13	Gujjar^{4}	-do-
*15	Ghazi (Gaddi), Ghosi	12011/68/93-BCC(C) dt. 10 September 1993 and 12011/96/94-BCC dt. 9 March 1996
*17	Chikwa, Qassab, (Qureshi), Kasai/ Qassai, Chak^{5}	12011/68/93-BCC(C) dt. 10 September 1993, 12011/44/96-BCC dt. 6 December 1996, 12011/68/98-BCC dt. 27 October 1999 and 12011/88/98-BCC dt. 6 December 1999
*18	Chhipi, Chhipe^{6}	12011/68/93-BCC(C) dt. 10 September 1993 and 12011/21/95-BCC dt. 15 May 1995
*19	Jogi^{7}	12011/68/93-BCC(C) dt. 10 September 1993
*20	Jhojha	-do-
*21	Dafali	-do-
*23	, Rogangar, Teli (Muslim), | Hindu For Teli Sahu, Teli Rathore^{8}	12011/68/93-BCC(C) dt. 10 September 1993, 12011/68/98-BCC dt. 27 October 1999 and 12011/88/98-BCC dt. 6 December 1999
*24	Darzi	12011/68/93-BCC(C) dt. 10 September 1993
*26	Naqqal	-do-
*27	Nat^{9} (excluding those who are included in Scheduled Castes)	-do-
*29	Faqir, Dewan, Sai, Alvi, Shah	12011/7/95-BCC dt. 8 March 2020
*30	Banjara, Mukeri, Ranki, Mekrani^{10}	12011/68/93-BCC(C) dt. 10 September 1993, 12011/36/99-BCC dt. 4 April 2000 and 12015/09/2000-BCC dt. 6 September 2001
*31	Barhai, Badhai, Viswakarma, Ramgarhia^{11}	12011/68/93-BCC(C) dt. 10 September 1993, 12011/88/98-BCC dt. 6 December 1999 and 12011/68/93-BCC(C) dt. 10 September 1993
*37	Bhurji, Bharbhuja, Bharbhunja, Bhooj, Kandu^{12}	12011/68/93-BCC(C) dt. 10 September 1993, 12011/21/95-BCC dt. 15 May 1995 and 12011/44/96-BCC dt. 6 December 1996
*38	Bhatiara	12011/68/93-BCC(C) dt. 10 September 1993
*39	Mali, Baghban^{13}	12011/68/93-BCC(C) dt. 10 September 1993, 12011/96/94-BCC dt. 9 March 1996 and 12011/04/2001-BCC dt. 13 January 2004
Siddiqui|Manihar, Kacher Tomar, Lakher Brahmans (Lakhera Brahmans in Tehri Garhwal region), Churihar^{14}	12011/68/93-BCC(C) dt. 10 September 1993, 12011/68/98-BCC dt. 27 October 1999 and 12011/88/98-BCC dt. 6 December 1999	
*42	Momin Ansar, Momin Ansari Malik, Saudagar, Ansari Arabi, Meman |	12011/68/93-BCC(C) dt. 10 September 1993, 12011/68/98-BCC dt. 27 October 1999 and 12011/88/98-BCC dt. 6 December 1999
*43	Mirasi	12011/68/93-BCC(C) dt. 10 September 1993
*44	Muslim Kayasth	-do-12011/69/94- BCC(C) dt.14 September 1989
*45	Naddaf (Dhunia),|, Mansoori|, Kandere, Mansoori|, pinara|,| Pinjara	12011/68/93-BCC(C) dt. 10 September 1993, 12011/96/94-BCC dt. 9 March 1996 and 12011/88/98-BCC dt. 6 December 1999
*47	Rangrez, chhipi^{15}	12011/68/93-BCC(C) dt. 10 September 1993 and 12011/44/96-BCC dt. 6 December 1996
*52	Halwai^{17}	-do-
*49	Lohar, Luhar, Saifi ^{16}	12011/68/93-BCC(C) dt. 10 September 1993 and 12011/68/98-BCC dt. 27 October 1999
*53	Hajjam (Nai), Salmani, Sain (Nai)^{18}	12011/68/93-BCC(C) dt. 10 September 1993, 12011/96/94-BCC dt. 9 March 1996, 12011/44/96-BCC dt. 6 December 1996 and 12011/36/99-BCC dt. 4 April 2000
*54	Halalkhor, Hela, Lal Begi (other than those who are included in the list of Scheduled Castes)^{19}	12011/96/94-BCC dt. 9 March 1996, 12011/36/99-BCC dt. 4 April 2000 and 12015/9/2000-BCC dt. 6 September 2001
*55	Dhobi^{20}(other than those who are already included in the list of Scheduled Castes for UP)	12011/96/94-BCC dt. 9 March 1996
*56	Meo, Mewati	12011/13/97-BCC dt. 3 December 1997
*57	Saqqa-Bhisti, Bhisti-Abbassi	BCC 16 April 2017
*59	Khumra, Sangtarash, Haseri	12011/68/98-BCC dt. 27 October 1999
*61	Atishbaz	-do-
*62	Madari	-do-
*63	Nalband, Sais	-do-
*64	Bhand, mugal	12011/88/98-BCC dt. 6 December 1999
*65	Mochi (excluding those who are included in the list of SC of Uttar Pradesh)^{21}	-do-
*66	Raj,(Memar)	-do-
*67	Sheikh Sarvari (Pirai), Peerahi	12011/36/99-BCC dt. 4 April 2000 and 12015/09/2000-BCC dt. 6 September 2001
*71	Kalal, Kalwar^{22}	-do-
*76	Gada	12015/15/2008- BCC dt. 16 June 2011

Notes:

- ^{1} largely Hindu community with a small Muslim minority
- ^{2} The Mallaah include a small Muslim minority.
- ^{3} The Kumhar are evenly divided between the Hindu and Muslim sections.
- ^{4} The nomadic Van Gujjar are entirely Muslim, while the settled Gujjars of western UP include a large Muslim minority.
- ^{5} The Chikwa and Qureshi Qassab are entirely Muslim, while the Chak are Hindu.
- ^{6} The Chippe are largely Hindu with a small Muslim minority.
- ^{7} largely Hindu with a small Muslim minority
- ^{8} the Teli Malik are Muslim.
- ^{9} Only Muslim Nat are in the OBC list; the Hindu section have Scheduled Caste status.
- ^{10} The Banjara are partly Muslim, while the Mukeri are entirely Muslim.
- ^{11} The Barhai are partly Muslim
- ^{12} The Bharbhunja are partly Muslim.
- ^{13} The Baghban are Muslim Mali.
- ^{14} The Manihar are Muslim, while the Churihar are largely Muslim.
- ^{15} The Rangrez are Muslim and Rangwa Hindu.
- ^{16} The Saifi are Muslim Lohar.
- ^{17} The Halwai are partly Muslim.
- ^{18} The Hajjam are Muslim Nai.
- ^{19} Only Muslim Bhangis such as the Halalkhor and Lalbegi are in the OBC list; the Hindu sections have Scheduled Caste status.
- ^{20} Only Muslim Dhobis are in the OBC list, the Hindu section have Scheduled Caste status.
- ^{21} Only Muslim Mochis are in the OBC list, the Hindu section have Scheduled Caste status.
- 22 caste mahigeer faruki ob list

Explanation: In the above list for Uttar Pradesh for all castes linked with traditional hereditary occupations, except those entered with specific mention of name of religion, are included, irrespective of whether their members follow Hinduism, Islam or any other religion.

- ^{23} the Mansoori are Muslim Dhunai.

== Utrakhand ==
Below is a list of Muslim communities that have been accorded Other Backward Classes status by the Government of India in the state of Utrakhand.

1. Bari Muslim
2. Chikwa, Kassab, Quraishi, Kasai, Qassai, Chak
3. Dhobi Muslim
4. Faqir
5. Hajjam (Nai), Salmani, Nai, Sain (Nai)
6. Halalkhor, Hela, Lalbegi
7. Meo
8. Mochi (excluding those who are included in the list of SCs)
9. Lohar, Luhar, Saifi
10. Rangrez, Rangwa
11. Momin, Ansar, Ansari, Julaha
12. Muslim Kayastha
13. Naddaf, Dhunia, Mansoori, Behna, Kandere, Kadere, Pinjara
14. Nut Muslim
15. Saqqa-Bhisti, Bhisti-Abbassi
16. Sheikh Sarvari (Pirai), Peerahi
17. Teli Malik (Muslim)

== West Bengal ==
=== Central list ===
Below is a list of Muslim communities that have been accorded by OBC status by the Government of India in the state of West Bengal.

Entry number	Caste/community	Resolution no. and date
*23	Jolah	12011/96/94-BCC dt. 9 March 1996 and 12015/9/2000-BCC dt. 6 September 2001
*29	Fakir, Sain	12011/68/98-BCC dt. 27 October 1999
*45	Kasai-Quraishi	12011/36/99-BCC dt. 4 April 2000—
*53	Rayeen (Kunjra)	−12011/68/93-BCC(C) dt. 10 September 1993 and 12011/21/95-BCC dt. 15 May 1995
*55	Nashya-Sekh	12011/1/2001-BCC dt. 20 June 2003
*56	Shershabadia	12011/1/2001-BCC dt. 20 June 2003
*60	Jolah(Ansari Momin)	12015/9/2000-BCC dt. 6 September 2001
*63	Pahadia Muslim	12015/15/2008- BCC dt. 16 June 2011
*65	Hajjam(Muslim)	12015/05/2011-BC II dt. 17 February 2014
*66	Chowduli(Muslim)	12015/05/2011-BC II dt. 17 February 2014
*71	Nikari(Muslim)	12015/05/2011-BC II dt. 17 February 2014
*72	Mahaldar(Muslim)	12015/05/2011-BC II dt. 17 February 2014
*73	Dhukre(Muslim)	12015/05/2011-BC II dt. 17 February 2014
*74	Basni/ Bosni(Muslim)	12015/05/2011-BC II dt. 17 February 2014
*75	Abdal(Muslim)	12015/05/2011-BC II dt. 17 February 2014
*76	Kan(Muslim)	12015/05/2011-BC II dt. 17 February 2014
*77	Tutia(Muslim)	12015/05/2011-BC II dt. 17 February 2014
*78	Gayen(Muslim)	12015/05/2011-BC II dt. 17 February 2014
*79	Beldar Muslim	12015/05/2011-BC II dt. 17 February 2014
*69	Khotta Muslim	12015/05/2011-BC II dt. 17 February 2014
*83	Muslim Laskar	12015/05/2011-BC II dt. 17 February 2014
*86	Muslim upJamadar	12015/05/2011-BC II dt. 17 February 2014
*87	Muslim Chutor Mistri	12015/05/2011-BC II dt. 17 February 2014
*88	Muslim Dafadar	12015/05/2011-BC II dt. 17 February 2014
*88	Mal Muslim	12015/05/2011-BC II dt. 17 February 2014
*89	Majhi/ Patni Muslim	12015/05/2011-BC II dt. 17 February 2014
*90	Muchi/ Chamar Muslim	12015/05/2011-BC II dt. 17 February 2014
*91	Muslim Nehariya	12015/05/2011-BC II dt. 17 February 2014
*92	Muslim Haldar	12015/05/2011-BC II dt. 17 February 2014
*95	Muslim Sanpui/ Sapui	12015/05/2011-BC II dt. 17 February 2014
*96	Muslim Biswas	12015/05/2011-BC II dt. 17 February 2014
*97	Muslim Mali	12015/05/2011-BC II dt. 17 February 2014
*98	Ghosi(Muslim)	12015/05/2011-BC II dt. 17 February 2014
*99	Muslim Darji/ Ostagar/ Idrishi	12015/05/2011-BC II dt. 17 February 2014
*100	Muslim Rajmistri	12015/05/2011-BC II dt. 17 February 2014
*101	Muslim Bhatiyara	12015/05/2011-BC II dt. 17 February 2014
*102	Muslim Molla	12015/05/2011-BC II dt. 17 February 2014
*103	Dhali(Muslim)	12015/05/2011-BC II dt. 17 February 2014
*105	Muslim Piyada	12015/05/2011-BC II dt. 17 February 2014
*106	Muslim Barujibi/ Barui	12015/05/2011-BC II dt. 17 February 2014
*108	Muslim Penchi	12015/05/2011-BC II dt. 17 February 2014
*137	Muslim Sardar	12015/05/2011-BC II dt. 17 February 2014

=== State list ===
Below is a list of Muslim communities that have been accorded OBC status by the state government of West Bengal.

SI.	Caste	Particulars of connected orders
*16	Jolah	Notification No.705-TW/EC dt. 13.12.94
*31	Fakir, Sain	Notification No. 183-TW/EC dt. 8 March 1996
*44	Hawari	Notification No. 93-TW/EC dt. 1 February 1997
*49	Dhunia	Notification No. 93-TW/EC dt. 1 February 1997
*50	Patidar	Notification No. 93-TW/EC dt. 1 February 1997
*51	Kasai	Notification No. 93-TW/EC dt. 1 February 1997
*52	Pajra	
*54	Nashya-Sekh	Notification No. 84-BCW/RC dt. 1 March 1999
*63	Shershabadia	Notification No. 5001-BCW Dt.7-10-02
*65	Hajjam	Notification No.3230 – BCW dt. 04-12-08 read with No. 264/BCW dt. 28-01-09
*66	Chowduli	Notification No. 485/BCW dt. 20 February 2009
*68	Beldar Muslim	Notification No. 771-BCW/MR-436/1999 dt. 5 March 2010
*69	Khotta Muslim	Notification No. 771-BCW/MR-436/1999 dt. 5 March 2010
*70	Sardar	Notification No. 771-BCW/MR-436/1999 dt. 5 March 2010
*71	Nikari	Notification No. 1403-BCW/MR-436/99(I) dt. 26 April 2010
*72	Mahaldar	Notification No. 1403-BCW/MR-436/99(I) dt. 26 April 2010
*73	Dhukr	Notification No. 1403-BCW/MR-436/99(I) dt. 26 April 2010
*74	Basni / Bosni	Notification No. 1403-BCW/MR-436/99(I) dt. 26 April 2010
*75	Abdal	Notification No. 1403-BCW/MR-436/99(I) dt. 26 April 2010
*76	Kan	Notification No. 1403-BCW/MR-436/99(I) dt. 26 April 2010
*77	Tutia	Notification No. 1639-BCW/MR-436/1999 dt. 14 May 2010
*78	Gaven	Notification No. 1639-BCW/MR-436/1999 dt. 14 May 2010
*79	Bhatia Muslim	Notification No. 1639-BCW/MR-436/1999 dt. 14 May 2010
*80	Midde	Notification No. 1929-BCW/MR-436/99(I) dt. 2 June 2010
*81	Mallick	Notification No. 1929-BCW/MR-436/99(I) dt. 2 June 2010
*83	Laskar	Notification No. 1929-BCW/MR-436/99(I) dt. 2 June 2010
*84	Baidya Muslim	Notification No. 1929-BCW/MR-436/99(I) dt. 2 June 2010
*86	Chutor Mistri	Notification No. 1929-BCW/MR-436/99(I) dt. 2 June 2010
*87	Dafadar	Notification No. 1929-BCW/MR-436/99(I) dt. 2 June 2010
*88	Mal Muslim	Notification No. 1929-BCW/MR-436/99(I) dt. 2 June 2010
*89	Majhi / Patni Muslim	Notification No. 1929-BCW/MR-436/99(I) dt. 2 June 2010
*90	Muchi / Chamar Muslim	Notification No. 1929-BCW/MR-436/99(I) dt. 2 June 2010
*91	Nehariya	Notification No. 2317-BCW/MR-436/99 dated 1 July 2010
*92	Muslim Haldar	Notification No. 2317-BCW/MR-436/99 dated 1 July 2010
*93	Muslim Mandal	Notification No. 2317-BCW/MR-436/99 dated 1 July 2010
*95	Muslim Sanpui/Sapui	Notification No. 2317-BCW/MR-436/99 dated 1 July 2010
*96	Muslim Biswas	Notification No. 2317-BCW/MR-436/99 dated 1 July 2010
*97	Muslim Mali	Notification No. 2317-BCW/MR-436/99 dated 1 July 2010
*98	Ghosi	Notification No. 2317-BCW/MR-436/99 dated 1 July 2010
*99	Darji / Ostagar / Idrishi	Notification No. 2317-BCW/MR-436/99 dated 1 July 2010
*100	Rajmistri	Notification No. 5045-BCW/MR-436/99(I) dated 31 August 2010
*101	Bhatiyara	Notification No. 5045-BCW/MR-436/99(I) dated 31 August 2010
*102	Mollah	Notification No. 5045-BCW/MR-436/99(I) dated 31 August 2010
*103	Dhali (Muslim)	Notification No. 5045-BCW/MR-436/99(I) dated 31 August 2010
*104	Tal-Pakha Benia	Notification No. 5045-BCW/MR-436/99(I) dated 31 August 2010
*105	Muslim Piyada	Notification No. 5045-BCW/MR-436/99(I) dated 31 August 2010
*106	Muslim Barujibi / Barui	Notification No. 5045-BCW/MR-436/99(I) dated 31 August 2010
*107	Bepari / Byapari Muslim	Notification No. 5045-BCW/MR-436/99(I) dated 31 August 2010
*108	Penchi	Notification No. 6305-BCW / MR-436/99(I) dated 24 September 2010
*109	Bhangi (Muslim)	Notification No. 1673-BCW / MR-209/11 dated 11 May 2012
*110	Dhatri/Dai/Dhaity (Muslim)	Notification No. 1673-BCW / MR-209/11 dated 11 May 2012
*111	Gharami (Muslim)	Notification No. 1673-BCW / MR-209/11 dated 11 May 2012
*112	Ghorkhan	Notification No. 1673-BCW / MR-209/11 dated 11 May 2012
*113	Halsana (Muslim)	Notification No. 1673-BCW / MR-209/11 dated 11 May 2012
*114	Kayal (Muslim)	Notification No. 1673-BCW / MR-209/11 dated 11 May 2012
*115	Naiya (Muslim)	Notification No. 1673-BCW / MR-209/11 dated 11 May 2012
*116	Shikari/Sikari (Muslim)	Notification No. 1673-BCW / MR-209/11 dated 11 May 2012
*117	Adaldar (Muslim)	Notification No. 1673-BCW / MR-209/11 dated 11 May 2012
*118	Adaldar (Muslim)	Notification No. 1673-BCW / MR-209/11 dated 11 May 2012
*119	Akunji/Akan/Akhan (Muslim)	Notification No. 1673-BCW / MR-209/11 dated 11 May 2012
*120	Bag (Muslim)	Notification No. 1673-BCW / MR-209/11 dated 11 May 2012
*121	Chaprashi (Muslim)	Notification No. 1673-BCW / MR-209/11 dated 11 May 2012
*122	Churihar	Notification No. 1673-BCW / MR-209/11 dated 11 May 2012
*123	Daptari (Muslim)	Notification No. 1673-BCW / MR-209/11 dated 11 May 2012
*124	Dewan (Muslim)	Notification No. 1673-BCW / MR-209/11 dated 11 May 2012
*125	Dhabak (Muslim)	Notification No. 1673-BCW / MR-209/11 dated 11 May 2012
*126	Gazi (Muslim)	Notification No. 1673-BCW / MR-209/11 dated 11 May 2012
*127	Khan (Muslim)	Notification No. 1673-BCW / MR-209/11 dated 11 May 2012
*128	Kolu Muslim (Shah, Sahaji, Sadhukhan, Mondal)	Notification No. 1673-BCW / MR-209/11 dated 11 May 2012
*129	Majhi	Notification No. 1673-BCW / MR-209/11 dated 11 May 2012
*130	Malita/Malitha/Malitya (Muslim)	Notification No. 1673-BCW / MR-209/11 dated 11 May 2012
*131	Sekh (Muslim)	Notification No. 1673-BCW / MR-209/11 dated 11 May 2012
*132	Paik (Muslim)	Notification No. 1673-BCW / MR-209/11 dated 11 May 2012
*133	Pailan (Muslim)	Notification No. 1673-BCW / MR-209/11 dated 11 May 2012
*134	Purkait (Muslim)	Notification No. 1673-BCW / MR-209/11 dated 11 May 2012
*135	Sana (Muslim)	Notification No. 1673-BCW / MR-209/11 dated 11 May 2012
*136	Sareng (Muslim)	Notification No. 1673-BCW / MR-209/11 dated 11 May 2012
*137	Sardar (Muslim)	Notification No. 1673-BCW / MR-209/11 dated 11 May 2012
*138	Sarkar (Muslim)	Notification No. 1673-BCW / MR-209/11 dated 11 May 2012
*139	Shah (Fakir)/Shah/Sha/Sahaji)	Notification No. 1673-BCW / MR-209/11 dated 11 May 2012
*140	Tarafdar (Muslim)	Notification No. 1673-BCW / MR-209/11 dated 11 May 2012
*141	Gavara	Notification No. 1673-BCW / MR-209/11 dated 11 May 2012
*142	Mouli (Muslim)	Notification No. 1673-BCW / MR-209/11 dated 11 May 2012
*143	Sepai (Muslim)	Notification No. 1673-BCW / MR-209/11 dated 11 May 2012
*144	Sekh/Seikh	Notification No. 845-BCW/sekhMR-147/12 dated 10 October 2012
*145	Bayen (Muslim)	Order No. 2770-BCW/MR-116/12 dated 29 August 2014 read with Corrigendum published in Kolkata Gazette dated 9 December 2014
*146	Bhuiya/Bhunya (Muslim)	Order No. 2770-BCW/MR-116/12 dated 29 August 2014 read with Corrigendum published in Kolkata Gazette dated 9 December 2014
*147	Borah / Bara / Bora (Muslim)	Order No. 2770-BCW/MR-116/12 dated 29 August 2014 read with Corrigendum published in Kolkata Gazette dated 9 December 2014
*148	Gorey (Muslim)	Order No. 2770-BCW/MR-116/12 dated 29 August 2014 read with Corrigendum published in Kolkata Gazette dated 9 December 2014
*149	Hati (Muslim)	Order No. 2770-BCW/MR-116/12 dated 29 August 2014 read with Corrigendum published in Kolkata Gazette dated 9 December 2014
*150	Jatuya (Muslim)	Order No. 2770-BCW/MR-116/12 dated 29 August 2014 read with Corrigendum published in Kolkata Gazette dated 9 December 2014
*151	Khondekar/Khonkar (Muslim)*	Order No. 2770-BCW/MR-116/12 dated 29 August 2014 read with Corrigendum published in Kolkata Gazette dated 9 December 2014
*152	Pahar (Muslim)	Order No. 2770-BCW/MR-116/12 dated 29 August 2014 read with Corrigendum published in Kolkata Gazette dated 9 December 2014
*153	Raptan (Muslim)	Order No. 2770-BCW/MR-116/12 dated 29 August 2014 read with Corrigendum published in Kolkata Gazette dated 9 December 2014
*154	Baradi (Muslim)*	Order No. 2770-BCW/MR-116/12 dated 29 August 2014 read with Corrigendum published in Kolkata Gazette dated 9 December 2014
*155	Dalal (Muslim)	Order No. 2770-BCW/MR-116/12 dated 29 August 2014 read with Corrigendum published in Kolkata Gazette dated 9 December 2014
*156	Hoseni Goyala (Muslim)	Order No. 2770-BCW/MR-116/12 dated 29 August 2014 read with Corrigendum published in Kolkata Gazette dated 9 December 2014
*157	Khalashi (Muslim)	Order No. 2770-BCW/MR-116/12 dated 29 August 2014 read with Corrigendum published in Kolkata Gazette dated 9 December 2014
*158	Kichni (Muslim)	Order No. 2770-BCW/MR-116/12 dated 29 August 2014 read with Corrigendum published in Kolkata Gazette dated 9 December 2014
*159	Mukti/Mufti (Muslim)	Order No. 2770-BCW/MR-116/12 dated 29 August 2014 read with Corrigendum published in Kolkata Gazette dated 9 December 2014

Notes:

- ^{1} Indicate Muslim communities amongst the OBCs

== See also ==
- List of Other Backward Classes
- Scheduled Tribes
- Reservation in India
