= Abdal (caste) =

Muslim community in South Asia

Regions with significant populations
- India • Pakistan • Nepal

Languages
- Urdu • Maithili • Gujarati • Bengali

Religion
- Islam

Related ethnic groups
- Jogi Faqir • Faqir • Qalandar • Rawal • Sai • Abdal people (West Asia)

The Abdal (Shekh Hashmi) are a Muslim community found in North India. They are a sub-group within the Arabic old Shekh community. They are classified as an Other Backward Caste in Bihar.

== See also ==
- Faqir
