= Maliar =

Total population
- 746,000

Languages
- Punjabi, Hindko

Religion
- Islam

Related ethnic groups
- Kunjra, Rayeens, Arain, Baghban

The Maliar is a Punjabi community found in the Pothohar Plateau of Punjab, Pakistan as well as the Peshawar valley and some other parts of the North West Frontier Province (now Khyber Pakhtunkhwa).

Unlike other Punjabi tribes, Maliar refers to the occupation of the holder rather than his origin. Their origin is unknown, however it is believed that Maliars are descended from ancestors of different tribes which took to market-gardening as a profession.

The Maliar associate themselves with the Arain, another agricultural tribe in Punjab. This is because in Western Punjab, the term Arain is used for any individual of an agricultural occupation and not solely the Arain tribe.

== History ==
The term Maliar comes from the Sanskrit Malakara makers of garland or from the Persian and Arabic word Mal which means wealth or land e.g. Malir Kotla in India or Malir an area in Karachi the equivalent of Bagh in Urdu or garden in English. According to their traditions their ancestor Mahbub accompanied Sultan Mahmud of Ghazna to India. The Sultan assigned him gardening as a vocation, and as such the community became horticulturists. There is no consensus as to the ethnic identity of this Mahbub. This concocted tradition is not tenable because the Maiar/Baghbanan or Phularay were basically son of the soil and converted to Islam en masse otherwise who was tilling small land or orchards and gardens. If we accept this account, the community thus settled in India at the start of the 11th century. Historically, the community was at a disadvantage, particularly in the Peshawar valley, where it suffered at the hands of Pashtun landlords.

Unlike other tribes found in the Potohar region, military recruitment was not open to them, because they were deemed not to be a martial race.

According to the 1901 Census of India, there numbers in Jhelum District were 23,000, in Rawalpindi District, they numbered 17,000 and in Attock District they numbered 37,000. In that particular district, they are the fourth largest tribe. Shahpur District, the modern day Sargodha District was home to a further 4,000.

== Distribution ==
They are found through the Pothohar region, with especial concentrations in the Attock District. They also extend into the neighbouring Peshawar valley and into Haripur district of Hazara, Khyber Pakhtunkhwa. There are also settled in a few villages in the Mirpur District of Azad Kashmir.

== Villages ==
They are found in just about every village in the Pothohar region, but there are a few villages which they occupy as the dominant tribe. In Jhelum District, Kazi Hussain and Rajjo Pindi are two important Maliar villages.

Batala, Chahal, Maniand are important Maliar villages within Kahuta Tehsil, in Gujar Khan Tehsil Kant Maliar and Bagh Sangra, Jabbar Derwaish, Kuri Malrian(Kuri Khuda Baksh) are important villages and in the Rawalpindi Tehsil, Dhalla, Dughal, Khasala Kalan, Gulidana Maliar, and Salargarh are important villages. In Attock District, Dhok Maliaran in Fateh Jang Tehsil is a major Maliar village. in Hazro Tehsil they are found in the villages of Kalu Kalan, Bhangi, Lakori, Saleem Khan, Asghar, Ababakar etc.They are also found in the town of Mansar.

In Chakwal District, Mohra Maliaran, Marjan Maliran and Saloi in Choa Saidan Shah Tehsil are important villages.

in Jhelum District, the villages of Dheri Malliaran and Maliar in Pind Dadan Khan Tehsil are important settlements.

In Gujrat District, the village of Dandi Maliar.

== Language ==
The Maliar predominantly speak Punjabic languages, mainly Hindko and Pothwari
