= Sorgar =

Muslim community in India

The Sorgar are a Manihar Muslim community found in the state of Rajasthan in India.
