= Mikrani =

Mikrani (Nepali: मिकरानी; Urdu: مکرانی) are a Muslim community mainly settled in the Sarlahi and Rautahat districts of Nepal, Bijnor, Moradabad and Bareily in Uttar Pradesh, and Bihar, and Gujarat in India, Rajshahi, Gaibandha, Dinajpur and Old Dhaka in Bangladesh as well as in Pakistan and Afghanistan. They are also known as Mukeri, Barmaki, Ranki and Muzkeri. They belong to the Muker tribe and the Mikrani title is mostly used in Nepal, India and Bangladesh while some also use Mukeri or Miya Mukeri.

== Bibliography ==
- Niroula, Badri P. (January 1998). "Caste/Ethnic Composition of Population of Nepal" (PDF). Contributions to Nepalese Studies. 25 (1). CNAS/TU: 15–56.
