= Chik (community) =

Muslim community in India

Chik or Chikwa
Regions with significant populations
- • India • Pakistan

Languages
- • Urdu • Hindi • Sadri

Religion
- Islam

Related ethnic groups
- • Qureshi • Qassab • Khateek

The Chik are a Muslim community, found in the states of Bihar and Uttar Pradesh in India. They are also known as Bakar Qasab, Buz Qassab and Chikwa. The Chik have been granted the Other Backward Class status in both Bihar and Uttar Pradesh.
