= Muslim Dhobi =

Muslim descendants of Dhobi

Regions with significant populations
- Nepal • Pakistan • India

Languages
- • Urdu • Hindi • Gujarati • Punjabi • Seraiki

Religion
- Islam

Related ethnic groups
- Malik • Shaikh

The Muslim Dhobi are a South Asian Muslim caste whose traditional occupation is washing clothes. They are converts from Hinduism to Islam here the Dhobi castes are launderers. Muslim Dhobis are found throughout the Indian subcontinent. They are OBC in Haryana. Now they are demanding ST rights.

The community is also known as Charhoa and Gazar in Pakistan, and Qassar in India. They also use "Hawari" as a surname.

== Present circumstances ==
=== In Pakistan ===
In Pakistan, the Punjab Qassar are mainly a rural community. The Qassar are an artisan caste, receiving a fixed share of the agricultural produce for their services. The Gazar sub-division, found in southern Punjab, have taken to agriculture. The Gazar and Charhoa are Seraiki speaking, while the Qassar in central Punjab speak Punjabi.

== See also ==
- Salmani
- Malik
- Momin Ansari
