= Jogi Faqir =

Muslim community in North India

Regions with significant populations
- • India • Pakistan • Nepal

Languages
- • Urdu • Hindi

Religion
- Islam

Related ethnic groups
- • Faqir • Jogi • Qalandar • Sai • Shaikh •

The Jogi Faqir or yogi Faqir is a Muslim community located in North India. They are also known as Madariya Faqir. The Jogi Faqir are one of the two sub-divisions of the Faqir found in Uttar Pradesh, India.

== See also ==
- Jogi (caste)
- Qalandar (clan)
