= Qalandar (caste) =

Muslim ethnic group in north India and Pakistan

Regions with significant populations
- India; Pakistan

Languages
- Urdu; Hindi

Religion
- Islam

Related ethnic groups
- Jogi; Jogi Faqir; Sai

The Qalandar (Hindi: क़लन्दर, Urdu: قلندر) are a Muslim ethnic group found in North India and Pakistan. They are also known as Qalander Faqir. A few Qalandar are also found in the Terai region of Nepal.

== History and origins ==
In Pakistan, the Qalandar are found mainly in Punjab. According to their traditions, they are descended from ancestors that arrived from Balkh and Bukhara in Central Asia in the distant past. They were said to be devotees of the Sufi saint Bu Ali Shah Qalandar of Panipat. Unlike the Uttar Pradesh Qalandar, who moved east, the Qalandar of what became Pakistan began a slow migration westward, with small groups arriving in Punjab by the mid-15th century. At the time of the partition of India in 1947, the Muslim Qalandar of east Punjab, which included Panipat and Karnal, moved to Pakistan, joining groups who were already settled there.

== Present circumstances ==
=== In India ===
In North India, some Qalandar began leading bears, monkeys, and other performing animals with which they wandered, announcing their presence with an hourglass-shaped drum called a damru, which was used in their performances for emphasis, while a larger group settled in Uttar Pradesh, Bihar, and Bengal and began a sedentary life while continuing to hold their traditional mystic religious beliefs. Some of them became connected to different khanqah in Bihar, especially in Bihar Sharif and Danapur. Historically, all Qalandar were once nomadic, but many are now settled. In 1972, bear hunting and capture were declared illegal in India, and there has been persistent effort by the Indian government to clamp down on bear performing. In addition, the traditional occupation of bear fighting has received much criticism from animal rights activists in the West and has been banned in India. Many Qalandar have become farmers, though their holdings are small, and many are sharecroppers. A much larger group of Qalandars are daily wage labourers, and they exist as a marginalized community, both socially and economically.

=== In Pakistan ===
The basic unit of the Qalandar society is the tent, or puki. Each puki represents a commensal group, comprising a female, her spouse, and unmarried children. A collection of puki forms a dera, or camp. Most members of the dera are related to each other. Marriages are formed with close kin, and the Qalandar practice both cross-cousin and parallel-cousin marriages.

Unlike their Indian counterparts, the Pakistan Qalandar are still nomadic, with most involved in their traditional occupations of entertainment routines involving trained bears, monkeys, dogs, and goats. In addition, they are often jugglers, acrobats, magicians, impersonators, and beggars. The Qalandar travel from community to community, setting up camp in fallow fields. In Pakistan, bears are trapped by members of the Kohistani ethnic group and then sold to the Qalandar in markets in Peshawar and Rawalpindi. The Qalandar are an extremely marginalized group, suffering from discrimination, and often victims of abuse by state officials such as the police or municipal staff.

== See also ==
- Jogi
- Mirshikar
