= Cheetah Mehrat =

Indian caste

चीता मेहरात

Total population
- 1 million

Regions with significant populations
- Ajmer, Bhilwara, Pali, and Rajsamand districts of Rajasthan, India

Languages
- Rajasthani, Hindi

Religion
- Syncretised form of Hinduism and Islam

Related ethnic groups
- Rajasthani people, Chauhan Rajput

Cheetah Mehrat is an ethnic group in the state of Rajasthan, India. They are spread across Ajmer, Bhilwara, Pali, and Rajsamand districts of Rajasthan. The estimated population of Cheetah Mehrat is approximately one million. The community is known for its harmonious coexistence between Hindus and Muslims. They practise both religions. Cheetah Mehrat is classified as an Other Backward Class.

== History and culture ==
The origin of the Cheetah Mehrat community lacks documented historical accounts, making it difficult to ascertain their exact roots. The Cheetah Mehrat community claims its origins back to the Chauhan rulers and adopted Islam approximately 700 years ago while preserving their Hindu customs and practices. Despite practicing different religions, the community maintains a strong cultural identity. Their names, marriage rituals, and dressing styles reflect the religion they follow, be it Hinduism or Islam.

According to local legend, they claim descent from the Chauhan Rajputs, specifically Rao Anhal Chauhan and his brother Rao Anoop Chauhan. As per the folklore, these brothers established a small kingdom in the region known as Magra Merwara after successfully defeating the Gujjars.

The Cheetah Mehrat are notable for their harmonious coexistence between Hindus and Muslims, exemplified by families with members of both religions living together. This cultural diversity is deeply ingrained in their heritage, and the community takes pride in their longstanding tradition of unity.

In Ajaysar village in Ajmer district, a prominent location for the Cheetah Mehrat community, a temple and mosque coexist within the same compound, symbolizing unity and understanding. During their weddings, it is customary for the procession to visit both the temple and mosque, honoring the traditions of both religions.

== Present circumstances ==
The Cheetah Mehrat community faces challenges in accessing government schemes and obtaining necessary documents such as ration cards due to their unique identity. Officials sometimes lack understanding of their situation, leading to difficulties in receiving support. However, the community is gradually becoming more aware of its distinctive identity and striving for recognition and equal opportunities.

== See also ==
- Rajasthani people
- List of Muslim Other Backward Classes communities in India
