= Julaha =

Community in the Indian Sub-Continent

Regions with significant populations
- Indian subcontinent

Languages
- Hindi; Urdu; Bhojpuri; Punjabi; Haryanvi; Gujarati

Religion
- Hindu, Islam, Sikh

Related ethnic groups
- Salvi, Panika, Ansari, Devanga, Padmasali (caste), Koshta, Kori, Balai, Meghwal

The Julaha are a community within the Indian subcontinent, which adopted the profession of weaving. The caste is considered Socially and Educationally Backward. Known under many names, the Julahas have been practising this art for ages. Both Hindu and Muslim Julaha (and even Sikh) groups exist. For the Julahas who are Sikhs, they are known as Ramdasia Sikhs. Some Muslim Julaha identify themselves as "Ansaris."

== Etymology ==
The term Julaha may derive from the Persian julah (ball of thread).

== Statistics ==
Although reliable statistics are old, as per survey done in 1990s, the total population of Julahas in India was around 12 million. As per Caste Based Survey of Bihar 2022, the total number of Julahas in Bihar was 4.6 million.

== Prominent Figures ==
Prominent figures from the weaver community include:

- Kabir
- Maulana Asim Bihari

== Related groups ==
Other prominent weaving and handloom communities of the Indian subcontinent include the Salvi, Panika, Ansari, Devanga, Padmasali (caste), Koshta and the Kashmiri Kani weavers.

== See also ==
- Salvi
- Panika
- Momin Ansari
- Devanga
- Padmasali (caste)
- Koshta
- Balai
- Meghwal
