= Lakhera =

Ethnic group from North India

Total population
- 162,000

Regions with significant populations
- • India

Languages
- • Haryanvi • Hindi

Religion
- • Hinduism • Islam

Related ethnic groups
- • Chundrigar • Manihar

The Lakhera is a caste found in North India. In Uttarakhand, the Lakhera caste is found among Sarola Brahmins and are not considered OBC. They are a community traditionally associated with bangle making.

== Origin ==
The Lakhera get their name from the Sanskrit laksha kuru, meaning a worker in lac. According to their mythologies, the community was created by the dirt washed from the body of the goddess Parvati. Other traditions make them out to be Yaduvanshi Rajputs. They are said to have originated in Bulandshahr District in Uttar Pradesh, and then spread to Haryana, Rajasthan and Punjab. The community in Uttar Pradesh speak Hindi, while in Haryana they speak Haryanvi.

== Present circumstances ==
The Lakhera community consists of a number of clans, the main ones being the Chauhan, Bhati, Nainvaya, Bagdi, Nagoriya, Parihar, Solanki, Hatadiya and Atariya. They are an endogamous community, and each clan is exogamous. The majority of the Lakhera are still involved in the manufacture and selling of bangles. Some members of the community are now shopkeepers. The Lakhera are Hindu, and have customs similar to other North Indian Hindus. They live in multi-caste villages, occupying their own distinct quarters.

In Uttar Pradesh, the community is found mainly in the south and east of the state. They are found mainly in Jalaun, Hamirpur, Lalitpur and Jhansi.

== See also ==
- Manihar
- Lakhere
- Lakshkar (Laxkar)
