= Galiara =

Muslim community in Gujjarat, India

The Galiara are a Muslim community found in the state of Gujarat in India.
