= Muslim Rangrez =

Muslim community in North India

Rangrez
Regions with significant populations
- • India • Pakistan

Languages
- • Urdu • Hindi • Bhojpuri

Religion
- Islam

Related ethnic groups
- • Rangrez • Muslim Chhipi • Shaikh

The Rangrez are a Muslim community in North India, also known as Sabagh. Many migrated to Pakistan after independence, settling in Karachi, Sindh. They are listed as OBC in Haryana.

== See also ==
- Muslim Chhipi
- Shaikhs in South Asia
