= Dafer =

The Dafer are a community found in Saurashtra region of Gujarat state in India. They claim to have migrated from Sindh in modern-day Pakistan to Saurashtra through Kutch. There are both Muslim and Hindu Dafers.

The Dafer have a few clans, including: Nathwani, Ladak, Nagori, Mori, Somma, Kharwa, Chhar, Ker, Rathore, Lakha, Kharia etc. They speak Kutchi dialect.
