= Dafali =

Muslim community in India

The Dafali are a Muslim community found in India with the majority being in the state of Uttar Pradesh surname Masoodi. They are categorized as an Other Backward Class (OBC) in Uttar Pradesh. Dafali are also found in Pakistan, Bangladesh, and Nepal.

They are Dalit Muslims; along with other Dalit Muslim communities, they are called Arjal or Arzal. They are categorized as an EBC (Economically Backward Class) in Bihar.

== Origin ==
The Dafali are found throughout the country, including in West Bengal and Madhya Pradesh, but live primarily in Uttar Pradesh. In the west of the state, they are concentrated in the Pilibhit, Rampur, Moradabad, Sambhal, Badauon, Saharanpur, Kanpur and Bareilly districts, where the community speaks Khari boli. In Awadh, they are found mainly in the districts of Lucknow, Bahraich, Balrampur, Gonda, Shravasti, Sitapur, Basti, Siddharthnagar, Allahabad, Pratapgarh, and Jaunpur, where they are known as Hashmi and speak Awadhi and their tribal language, Madaah.
