= Muslim Gaddi =

Muslim community in India

The Muslim Gaddi are a Muslim community found mainly in the northern Indian states of Rajasthan, Haryana, Punjab, Uttar Pradesh, Bihar and Jharkhand. They are also known as Ghazi. Muslim Gaddis are Hindu Gaddis in origin that converted to Islam.

The Gaddi are a community that has traditionally been associated with farming, mostly cattle. They are involved in the selling of milk, especially those settled in towns. They have much in common with other pastoral communities, In western Uttar Pradesh, Rajasthan and Haryana the Gaddi possess agricultural land, and are a small and medium scale cultivators. However, in eastern Uttar Pradesh, the Gaddis are still synonymous with milk selling. The western Uttar Pradesh Gaddi, like other neighbouring peasant castes have benefited from the effects of the green revolution, and many have successfully begun mechanising their farming, such as buying tractors.

== Religion and culture ==
The Gaddi are Muslims of the Sunni sect, following various denominations such as Hanafi, Barelvi, Deobandi, and even local folk Islam. They are an endogamous community, practising clan and village exogamy in Rajasthan and Uttar Pradesh (i.e. not marrying within the clan). Among other Gaddi communities, marriages are preferred within the biradari, and with a marked preference for parallel cousin and cross cousin marriages. The Gaddi tend to reside in multi clan and multi religious villages, often occupying their own quarters. In western Uttar Pradesh, the Gaddi are what is often referred to as the dominant clan, usually making between half and two thirds of the population of the village, and their villages are referred to as Gaddi villages.

== Current status ==
Like many other rural Muslim communities, Gaddi Muslims have gradually shifted from traditional occupations like animal husbandry to real-estate prominently, or income-generating activities such as trade, and local businesses. However they continue to face challenges in terms of economic mobility and access to modern job markets. Education has been a key area of progress. Bihar and Jharkhand, in particular, have seen efforts to increase literacy rates among its Muslim population, including programs targeting rural communities.

The state of girl education among Gaddi Muslims in India is a work in progress, shaped by both challenges and opportunities. While significant strides have been made in improving the enrollment of girls in schools, there are still considerable hurdles to overcome, particularly in terms of early marriage, economic barriers, and cultural norms. The educational challenges and gender disparities for Gaddi Muslim girls are indeed more pronounced in rural areas rather than urban centers like Jamshedpur, Patna, Ranchi where educational infrastructure and socio-economic conditions tend to be better.

In Delhi, through the efforts of advocate Noor Mohammad, an All India Gaddi Welfare Association(AIGWA) was founded in the year 1988, with the aim of social upliftment of Gaddis from various parts of India. Gaddis have contributed to the development of modern India by effectively taking part in the scientific and technical establishments, medical profession, legal fraternity, and politics of India. Many Gaddis in India have migrated for better educational and financial opportunities to metropolitan cities like Delhi, Mumbai, Hyderabad, and Ahmedabad. Many Gaddis have emigrated to western countries in pursuit of better prospects.
