= Arain (Delhi) =

- Religions: Islam
- Country: India
- Region: Punjab and Uttar Pradesh

The Arain of Delhi are an Urdu-speaking Muslim community found in Delhi, India.
