= Pinjara =

Muslim community

Regions with significant populations
- • India • Pakistan

Languages
- • Urdu • Hindi • Marwari • Marathi • Gujarati •

Religion
- Islam

Related ethnic groups
- • Behna • Mansoori

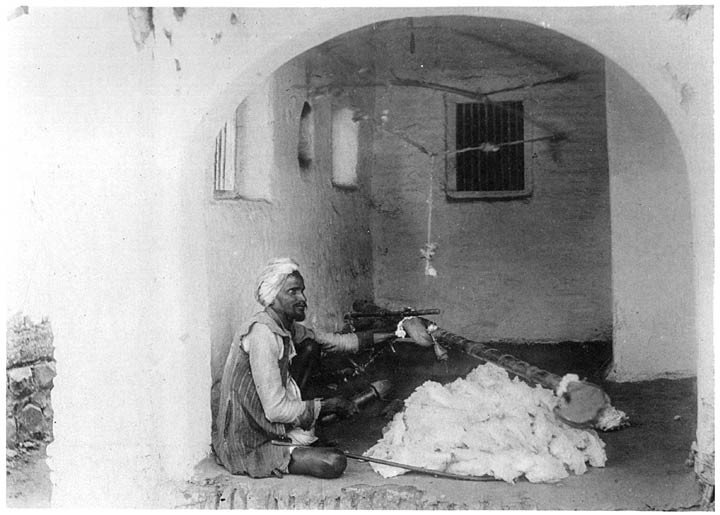

The Pinjara (mansoori) are a Muslim community found in the states of Maharashtra, Gujarat, Rajasthan and some parts of Madhya Pradesh in India. The Pinjara Muslims form a distinctive community of Indian Muslims primarily concentrated in the western state of Maharashtra, particularly in Mumbai. Where large communities termed as Jama'at Khanas were formed in the 1800s.

Originally the Pinjaras also called mansoori are the traditional cotton carders of Central India and the community is believed to have migrated to India from Central Asia, particularly during the medieval period when many skilled artisans from Iran moved into the Indian subcontinent. Some members of Pinjara community have migrated to Pakistan and settled in Karachi, Larkana, Umerkot and other regions of Sindh.

They are known as Shaikh Mansoori or Rangadis especially in Gujarat and Maharashtra, where the name Pinjara is no longer used. The name Mansoori is derived from a Sufi saint, Khwaja Mansoor Al Hallaj who belongs to al mansur family Al-Hallaj (c. 858-922). as they are claimed to be the decedents of him. Pinjara Muslims often speak the local languages of the regions they inhabit, such as Marathi, Gujarati, or Urdu, and their cultural practices are deeply influenced by their regional environments. The community is known for its strict adherence to Islamic practices and maintains a strong sense of social cohesion.

Renowned for their traditional involvement in textile weaving, their name, "Pinjara," derived from Marathi, translates to "cage," a reference to the enclosures once used for their weaving equipment. This community boasts a diverse cultural heritage shaped by influences from their Islamic faith, Marathi language and culture, as well as their unique history and traditions.

When it comes to food habits, Pinjara Muslims have a rich culinary heritage that reflects the diverse influences of their history, culture and places they are settled in. In Maharashtra Their cuisine is a blend of Marathi and Muslim cooking styles and incorporates a range of spices and flavors that are unique to the region. Fish is also a popular food item among Pinjara Muslims, particularly in coastal areas of Maharashtra. Pomfret, Surmai, and Bangda are some of the common varieties of fish that are consumed in the community. Sweets and desserts also hold a special place in Pinjara Muslim cuisine. They have a range of traditional sweets such as Phirni, Sheer Khurma, and Ladoo, which are often served during festivals and special occasions.

Their traditional occupation of cotton carding was eliminated by industrialization. Few continued to work as cotton carders or traders. Many turned towards manufacturing or other sectors. Marriages with members of other castes of the same status are occasionally permitted. Mansoori's are mostly active in business or in engineering or accounting.

Celebrating Islamic festivals such as Eid al-Fitr, Eid al-Adha, and Muharram, their cultural practices are deeply intertwined with their religious beliefs.
