= Churihar =

Muslim community in North India

The Churihar are a Muslim community, found in North India. The Churihar are included in the Central List of Other Backward Classes (OBC) in India, as indicated by the National Commission for Backward Classes (NCBC) under a Gazette Resolution from 2010.
