= Mochi (Muslim) =

Community, found in North India, Pakistan and Bangladesh

Regions with significant populations
- • Pakistan • India • Bangladesh

Languages
- • Urdu in India • Bengali in Bangladesh • Panjabi in Pakistan.

Religion
- Islam

Mochi are a community, found in North India, Pakistan and Bangladesh.They are the traditional shoemakers of South Asia.

== Muslim Mochi of Uttar Pradesh ==
The Muslim Mochi in Uttar Pradesh have been given the Other Backward Class status, which allows them to access a number of affirmative action schemes by the Government of India.

== Muslim Mochi of Punjab ==
The Mochi in rural Punjab is still dependent on the local landlord, who acts as patron. Often, are paid from each cash crop at the end of the harvesting season according to a system called seypi. Presently, many Mochis are no longer involved in their traditional occupation of shoemaking. Many are now landless agricultural labourers. Overall, the condition of the Mochi community in Punjab has worsened. There has been a marked shift towards manufactured shoes, which has seen a severe decline in the demand for their traditional skill. Many of their patrons from the locally dominant castes such as the Jats no longer pay the traditional seypi. Unlike in India, the Government of Pakistan has not provided any affirmative actions programmes. As such, the Mochi are one of the most vulnerable ethnic community in Pakistan, and are often victims of societal discrimination. The Muslim Mochi are entirely Sunni and speak Punjabi.

== See also ==
- Mochi (Hindu)
