= Multani Lohar =

Community in India

The Multani Lohar are a Muslim blacksmith and carpenter community found in the states of Gujarat and western Uttar Pradesh, and Madhya Pradesh in India.

Some of them are also found in state of Rajasthan, they converted to Islam from Rajput community and some from Brahmin community due to the influence of Sufi Islam in India in the 11th century. By creating egalitarian communities within the stratified caste systems, Sufis successfully spread their teachings of love, spirituality, and harmony. It was this example of Sufi brotherhood and equity that drew people to the religion of Islam. They also play a role as Rajput fighters on the side of Rajputana against the Mughal Army from Amar Singh Rathore Ruler of Marwar Rajasthan. For contributing in the army, they bought from ruler of Jodhpur To Nagaur equipment like cannonballs, swords, and armors. They also play a significance role in the freedom fight or revolution of 1857, seven Lohars fought with Britains and received martyrdom while fighting with them. They also stand with Khilafat Movement, Civil Disobedience Movement, Satyagraha. In the revolution of 1942 Quit India Movement: freedom movements of Mahatma Gandhi. Nowaday they are found mostly in three states and minorly in seven states of India. Some of them are still blacksmiths but some of them moved on to the next generation for new opportunities.

== See also ==
- Multani (caste)
