= Gadhai =

The Gadhai are a Muslim community found in the state of Gujarat in India.
