= Changar =

Ancient tribe of South Asia

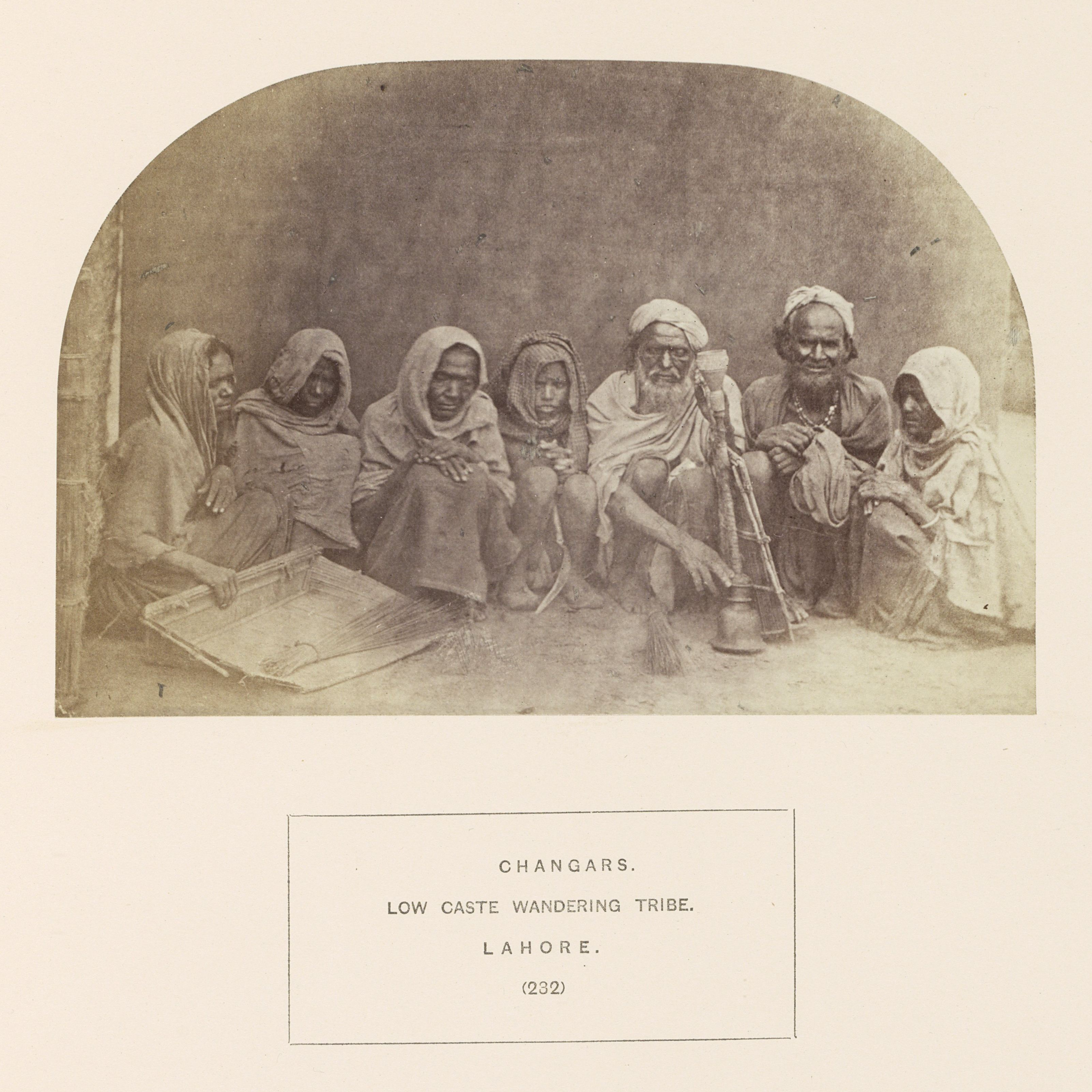
Group of seven crouched Changar people in Lahore, ca.1862–72

Changar or Chingar are an ancient mysterious vagabond tribe of South Asia.

Changars, sometimes called Cingân, Tsingan, Chingari, Tsingari, Tschangar, etc., are mostly vagabond and speak their own Changhri dialect. According to Johann Galletti and Franz Miklosich and some other early European historians, the Romani People of Europe are closely related to the Changars (German: Tschangar) and are Tschandala.

== Origin ==
According to Indian and Pakistani scholars, they are remnants of the Indo-Greeks and Greco-Bactrians, who intermingled with Jats, some of them left India at the time of Migration period and went in different ways to Europe, under the Hindu caste system, they are considered as Chandala

== Present circumstances ==
=== In India ===
They are OBC in Haryana and Himachal Pradesh.

=== In Pakistan ===
The majority of the Changars within northern and central Punjab are agricultural labourers, visiting villages during harvest time. They have established routes that they follow, and each Changar sub-group is allocated a particular village, and often serve a particular family in that village. Their patrons tend to belong to the large Muslim Jat community. In addition to agricultural labour, the Changar are also involved in the manufacture of baskets and brooms, communities. Nowadays only 10% are involving in this work. Many of Shamsi (Changar) are now in good Jobs and local business after getting education. In local Government they have their own Counselors and have Chairmanship.
