= Hela Mehtar =

Muslim community

The Hela are a community found in the state of Rajasthan in India. They are Muslim converts from the Hindu Hela caste.

== See also ==
- Halalkhor
