= Saiqalgar =

Muslim community in Maharashtra, India

The Shikalgar are a Muslim community found in the state of Maharashtra in India.

== Origin ==
The term Saiqalgar is derived from the Persian word صیقلگر saiqalgar, which means a polisher. They were traditionally involved in the polishing and furbishing of metals. Little is known as to the origin of this community, other than that they are one of a number of Muslim artisan groups found in Maharashtra. The Saiqalgar may be converts from the Hindu Sikligar community. They speak the Dakhani dialect of Urdu among themselves, and Marathi with outsiders. The Saiqalgars are found mainly in the Maharashtra districts of Kolhapur and Sangli. They are an extremely small community, with their settlements containing only a few families.

== Present circumstances ==
The Saiqalgar are now divided into groups, those who are now mainly small to medium-sized farmers, and a smaller groups who are still involved with the polishing and furbishing of metals. Among the latter groups, a small number have taken to the manufacture of fireworks.

The Saiqalgar generally marry within the community, but there are instances of marriage with neighbouring Muslim groups such as the Attar, Maner, Patwager and Tamboli. Like most Muslim artisan groups, the Saiqalgar have a caste association, the Sqailgar Jamaat. This organizations acts both as a welfare organization, as well as an instrument of social. They are entirely Sunni, but incorporate some folk beliefs.

== See also ==
- Sikligar
