= Muslim Ghosi =

Indian community in North India

Ghosi
Regions with significant populations
- India

Religion
- Islam

Related ethnic groups
- Ahirs , Muslim Gurjars

The Ghosi are a Muslim community found mainly in North India. It is said that Ahir and Gopas were originally Hindus who converted to Islam.

== History and origin ==
The Ghosi in West Bengal claim Gowala ancestry. The Ghosi of West Bengal are found mainly in the districts of 24 Parganas and Midnapore, in particular near the towns of Barrackpur and Kharagpur.

According to the traditions of this community, they emigrated from Kanpur, in what is now Uttar Pradesh some five centuries ago. The community thus took up the occupation of cattle rearing, and settled in Midnapur.

The community is now divided between those who still engage in the selling of milk, and the rest of the community who are now small and medium-sized farmers. They reside in multi-caste villages, which tend to have ghosiparas, "Ghosi areas". The community now speak Bengali, although most have knowledge of Hindi. They remain strictly endogamous, and are unique among Bengali Muslims in practising clan exogamy. Their main clans are the Rathore, Dogar, Chauhan, Khaleri, Totar, Lehar and Maidul. The Ghosi of West Bengal have an informal caste council, known as a panchayat, which acts as an institution of social control, resolving disputes within the community, and providing social welfare.

== See also ==
- Ahir
- Yadav
- Sadgop
