= Dhawad =

Community in Maharashtra, India

The Dhawad are a Tirole-Kunbi community found in the Indian state of Maharashtra. The Dhawad are a Kunbi Tirole caste. The Kunbi Tirole are an agricultural community found in the Khandesh region of Maharashtra. The community believe that they are Rajputs who migrated from Rajasthan as a result of a general migration of the tribes of Rajputana. The community speak Marathi.

== History ==
At the foot of Pratapgad near Mahabaleshwar, Rustam Jamal created a shivaji iron-clad tiger nail to fight in the war in 1659.

Rustam Jamal lived with his family in the Mahabaleshwar and Pratapgad area with his family. His community's business was to collect minerals and dissolve them in large clay molds, yielding pure iron for making utensils, tools and weapons. As their community grew, they began to migrate to other areas in search of minerals. At that time the Raja gave him some land. The people migrated from Konkan Pratapad/Mahabaleshwar hill area to Parj Bijapur to Hyderabad. These people began to be called according to their occupation. The people were scattered and settled in many places, mainly in Maharashtra. All the people were Muslims, but thereafter people of other religions joined in the business. The name of their village became Dhawadwadi and their caste category is Dhawad-319. In Maharashtra, three or more villages are named Dhawadwadi.

Dhawad people live in the Dhavadwadi villages. Most Dhawad traditionally engaged in farming. They practiced agriculture as their traditional occupation. The community has moved to cities and practice diverse occupations.
