= Kasgar =

Muslim community in Uttar Pradesh, India

The Kasgar are a Muslim community, found in the state of Uttar Pradesh in India. After the independence of Pakistan in 1947, many Kasgar migrated and resettled in Pakistan. They are now found mainly in the Sindh province of Pakistan and have become part of the Muhajir community.
