= Muslim Nats =

Muslim community in North India

Nat
Regions with significant populations
- India • Nepal

Religion
- Islam

The Nat are a Muslim community found in North India. A few are also found in the Terai region of Nepal.

== History and origin ==
The Muslim Nat are a semi-nomadic community, traditionally associated with rope dancing, juggling, fortune telling and begging. The Nat of Bihar are said to have immigrated from the Middle East and Central Asia. They are found mainly in the Bihar state districts of Madhubani, Darbhanga, Samastipur and Patna. They speak Urdu.

== Present circumstances ==
The Muslim Nat are now mainly cattle dealers, while a small number are involved in begging. They are one of the most marganalized Muslim community in Bihar. Almost all the Nat are landless. A small number of Nat have now settled down and are cultivators.

The Nat are strictly endogamous, and generally live in isolation from other Muslim communities in their neighbourhood. Although they are Sunni Muslims, they incorporate many folk beliefs.

In Uttar Pradesh, the Nat are said to have come originally from Chittaur in Rajasthan. They are found mainly in the districts of Varanasi, Allahabad, Barabanki and Jaunpur. The Nat speak Urdu and Hindi and converted to Islam during the rule of the Nawabs of Awadh, about two hundred years ago. The Muslim Nat consist of number of sub-groups, the main ones being the Aman, Goleri, Mahawat, Rari, Siarmaroa and Turkata. Many Nat are still involved with fortune telling and live a semi-nomadic lifestyle. Most Nat are now landless agricultural labourers, and are in depressed economic circumstances. The Nat are Sunni Muslims, but incorporate many folk beliefs.

In Haryana, they are found mainly in the districts of Faridabad, Gurgaon and Rohtak. They speak Haryanvi, and understand Hindi. Little is known about the exact circumstances that there conversinon to Islam. Historically, the community in Haryana were rope dancers, jugglers and acrobats. The Nat consist of a number of exogamous clans, the main ones being the Dagariya, Sansebar, Baraike, Khoyareke, Paharike, Nangariye, Dhadhasiya, Palike, Jirmichya, Dangiya, Kotiya, Shirkarake, Dilwati, Occhluke, Rashidiya, and Badanke. The Nat are no longer involved in their traditional occupation, and are now largely landless agriculture workers, migrating to different places in search of employment. They are nominally Sunni Muslim, but practice many folk beliefs.
