= Naqqal (community) =

Muslim community in Uttar Pradesh, India

The Naqqal are a Muslim community found in the state of Uttar Pradesh and Delhi in India. They are also known as the Kashmiri Bhand and recently as Kashmiri Shaikh. The Naqqal are a sub-group within the larger Bhand community.
