= Muslim Chhipi =

Muslim community

Chhipi
Regions with significant populations
- India

Religion
- Islam

Related ethnic groups
- Chhipi

The Muslim Chhipi are a Muslim community found mainly in the states of Bihar, Madhya Pradesh and Uttar Pradesh in India.

== Present circumstances ==
In Uttar Pradesh, the Chhipi are a strictly endogamous community, although there are cases of intermarriage with the Rangrez, another community that is associated with printing and dyeing. However, there is a marked preference to marry close kin, and they practice both parallel cousin and cross cousin marriages. The Chhipi are Sunni Muslims, and speak the Khari boli dialect of Hindi, but most can understand Urdu, and educated members of the community speak the language as well. They perceive themselves to be Shaikh status.

The Chhipi are still involved with the printing and dyeing of clothes. A small number have now entered other professions. In addition, the Chhipi are also involved in their sewing and selling of quilts. Like other artisan castes, they have also seen a decline in their traditional occupation. A good many are now wage labourers, with a smaller number who have taken to agriculture.

== See also ==
- Islam in Uttar Pradesh
