= Tuntia =

Tunia

The Tuntia, or sometimes pronounced Tutia, is a Muslim community found in the state of West Bengal in India. They are also known as Tute and are a community of Bengali-speaking peasant farmers.

== Origin ==
The community are said to have gotten their name from the Bengali word for mulberry, which is tut. Their traditional occupation was the rearing of mulberry silk, although most are now small to medium-sized farmers. The Tuntia are said to be converts from the Kabairtta caste, although there exact circumstances of their conversion of in unclear. They speak Bengali among themselves and with outsiders. The Tuntia are found almost entirely in the district of Midnapore, and in particular in the villages of Hatiahalka, Cherua, Ramnagar, Balihat, Uttar Simla, Bashripat, Rajar Bagan, Ranipatna Binodihi, Gollasai, Maheshpur, Murakata, Kharkusma, Garhbeta, Srinagar, Piardanga and Gopalpur.

== Present circumstances ==
The Tuntia have given up their traditional occupation of cultivating mulberry, and are now mainly small-scale farmers. They now grow mainly paddy, wheat, tomatoes, potatoes and brijnal. They are strictly endogamous, and marry close kin.

== See also ==
- Patua
