= Ramaiya =

Regions with significant populations
- India; Pakistan

The Ramaiya are a caste found in the state of Uttar Pradesh in India. Many members of this community migrated to Pakistan in 1947 and have settled in Punjab.
