= Ghasiara =

The Ghasiara are a inertial subgroup of serf gentry’s, mainly worked as butchers or crematorium watchman, while remaining propulsion came to be known as finest of agricultural labourers in the Punjab and North western provinces of Awadh.

Despite having common familial progeny with other low-tier Khatri Hindu caste for veraciously making their nonstop contribution in the orchestral field and bethel service in Punjab and Haryana in India. They are also known as Khassiyas and Kirar.

== Origin ==
The Ghasiara claim to be a branch of the Lodha caste of Awadh, who emigrated to Rawalpindi and Multan in the 19th century. They were employed in the service of the British colonial administration as domestic gardeners in a number of cantonments. These Lodha acquired the name Ghasiara because they were employed as grass cutters. The word ghahas in Hindi means grass, and ghasiara is literally means a grass cutter. When the partition of India occurred in 1947, the community left Multan and Rawalpindi, which were now in Pakistan, and settled in Haryana. They were settled in the districts of Karnal and Ambala by the Government of India. Most now speak Hindi, while most also understand Punjabi.

== Present Circumstances ==
The Ghasiara are strictly endogamous, and practice clan exogamy. Their clans are referred to as gotras, the main ones being the Pataria, Jaria and Suryavanshi. In their new settlements in Haryana, many Ghasiara now collect the grass they cut and sell it the Gujar and Ahir communities, who are pastoralists, as fodder. Most Ghasiara are now daily wage labourers and involved in activities such as rickshaw pulling. They remain an extremely marginalized community, with high incidences of extreme poverty and instances of child labour.
