= Kandera =

Hindu community in India

Kandera, Golandāz, Hawāidar, Bāṇadhāra (बाणधार) is a Hindu community found mainly in the northern and central regions of India. They belong to the Kshatriya varna. In earlier times, they were archers and warriors. Later, they also became involved in roles such as cannon operators, firework crafters, and the production of gunpowder and iron missiles. The term "काण्डेरा" (Kandera) is derived from the Sanskrit word "काण्डीर" (Kāṇḍīra), which means "an archer".

== History and origin ==
According to the book... "The Tribes and Castes of the Central Provinces of India" and other references, in 1911, the Kandera community consisted of around 2,200 individuals and was primarily concentrated in the Narsinghpur District.

Earlier, they were a relatively small occupational caste known for their expertise in archery. Over time, their skills expanded into the operation and production of artillery. They consider themselves to have come from Rajasthan, Bundelkhand, and Gwālior State. Their existence in the Ajmer-Merwara province was most prominent. In the past, the Kanderas played a significant role in the production of gunpowder and iron missiles, as well as in the operation of cannons within the Indian armies. The name "Kandera" is derived from the word "Kāṇḍīra", which is associated with arrows, "Bāṇadhāra" is a term for one who holds or uses arrows, while "Hawaidar" is a term for a maker of fireworks. They were often referred to as "Golandāz," which means 'ball-thrower,' highlighting their role as native artillerymen.

The community is also historically associated with the occupation of cotton ginning. Some Kanderas might have chosen this profession when they faced challenges securing employment in the native armies during the Mughal invasion.

According to their traditions, their ancestor, Raja Kanakpal Singh of Chittor settled at Amer in Samvat 1228. His dynasty ruled over Amer for a pretty long time. One of his grandson's daughter, Shakuntala became prey of the evil plans of Alauddin Khalji, the sultan of Delhi. The love marriage was not acceptable to her father. Consequently, he got Shakuntala married to a Rajput. But this was not acceptable to Sultan. He made an attack on the Rajputs, they were defeated, many members of their clan accepted Islam, took up the occupation of cotton ginning, and others were distributed to various different regions. This led some Rajputs to struggle with their social status and in finding employment in their traditional role, which continued afterwards. As a result, in some Indian states, they were put under other backward classes.

They were also associated with the Ajmer-Merwara province, where Kadera was a capital in Rathore rajput dynasty in 1811, and the Thakur of Kadera, Lal Singh, was the ruler at that time.

== Present circumstances ==
The Kanderas are found mainly in Rajasthan, Madhya Pradesh, Uttar Pradesh and Delhi in India. The community is divided into thirty six clans, and they practice clan exogamy. They are split between Hindu and Muslim groups, and there is no intermarriage between these two groups. In the Hindu tradition, individuals use various surnames, including but not limited to Kandera, Kadera, Rajput, Karan Rajput, Nagar, Golandaz, and their gotras. This multiplicity of surnames in the usage makes it difficult to identify them.
