= Muslim Kahar =

Community in northeast India and Bangladesh

The Kahar are a community found in northeast India and Bangladesh. Traditionally, they were palanquin bearers and agriculturists, and they belong to the Hindu Kahar caste. In some regions, particularly in the Murshidabad district of West Bengal, they are also known as Sardars.

== Origin ==
The Muslim Kahar claim descent from Pashtun settlers who arrived in Bengal during the Early Middle Ages. Historically, they were a community of palanquin bearers, though this occupation is no longer practiced. The name Kahar is believed to be derived from the Sanskrit term śandha-kara, meaning "those who carry loads on their shoulders." The community is widely distributed across West Bengal and Bangladesh, particularly in the districts of Murshidabad, 24 Parganas, and Nadia. They speak Bengali and follow Sunni Islam.

== Present circumstances ==
The Kahar have largely abandoned their traditional occupation of palanquin bearing and are now primarily agriculturists. They cultivate crops such as paddy, wheat, jute, and vegetables. A significant number of Kahar individuals are also employed as daily wage laborers.

The Kahar community resides in multi-caste villages, where they typically inhabit their own quarters, known as sardar paras. They practice strict endogamy, marrying within their community. Each Kahar settlement has an informal caste council, called a panchayat, which serves as an administrative body.
