= Rayee =

Rayeen
Regions with significant populations
- India

Languages
- • Urdu • Maithili • Nepali • Awadhi • Bhojpuri

Religion
- Islam

The Rayeen are a Muslim community found in Pakistan and India and the Terai region of Nepal. They are also known as Al-Raiee.
