= Gavandi =

Muslim community in Maharashtra, India

The Gavandi is a Muslim community found in the Indian state of Maharashtra, where large parts of present-day Maharashtra were formerly part of the historical Hyderabad State.
