= Chhipi =

Caste from northern India

Chhipa
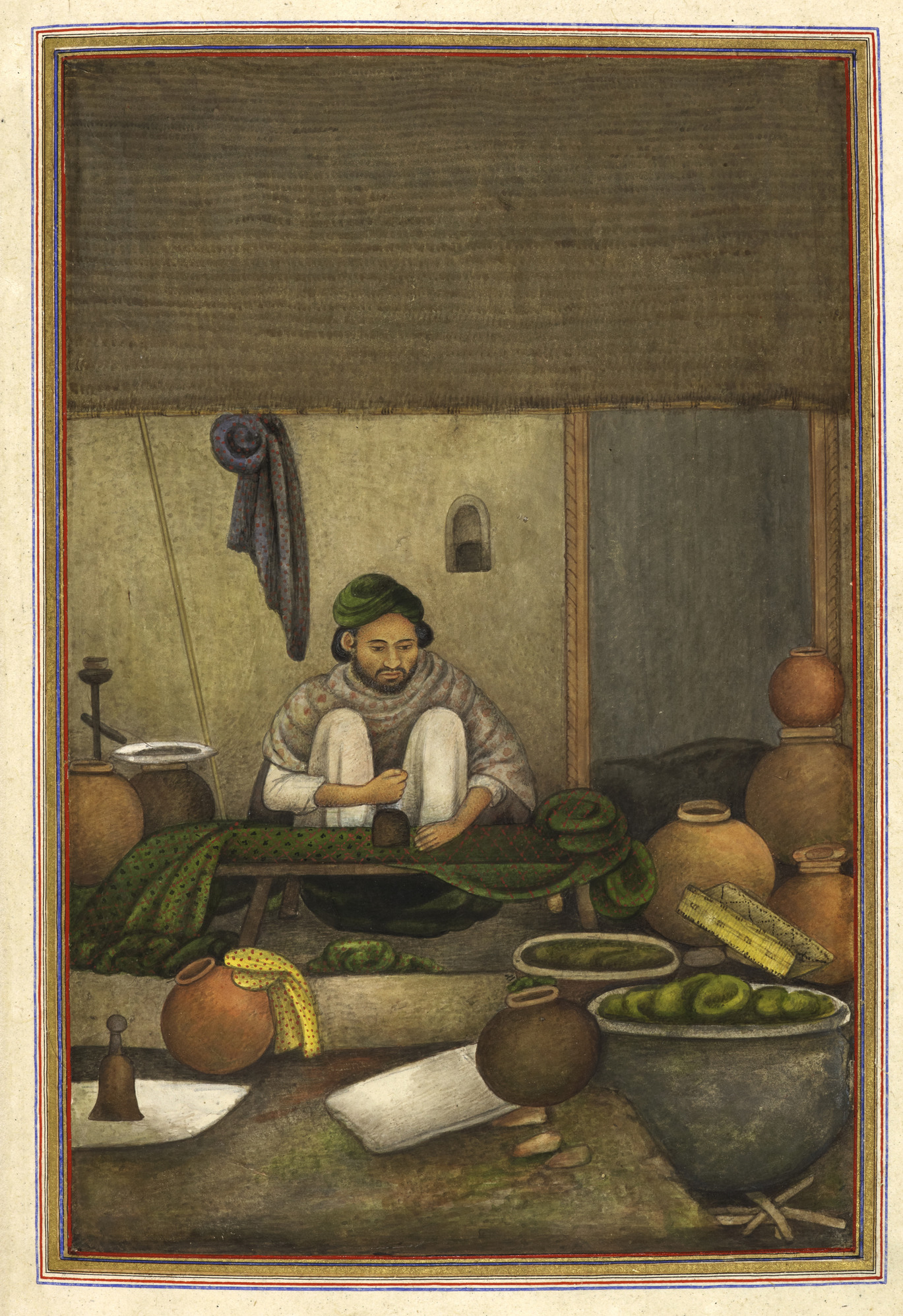
- Chhipa, a cloth printer from Tashrih al-aqvam (1825)

Regions with significant populations
- India and Pakistan

Languages
- Gujarati, Kutchi and Marwari

Religion
- Hinduism, Islam

Related ethnic groups
- Chhapa or Chhapola

Chhipi (alternatively called Chhimpa/Chhipa/Chimpa) is a caste of people with ancestral roots tracing back to India. These people are basically Rajputs and used to wear Kshatriya attire. They are found in the states of Gujarat, Rajasthan, Madhya Pradesh, Haryana, Delhi, Uttar Pradesh hyderabad Telangana, of India.

== History ==
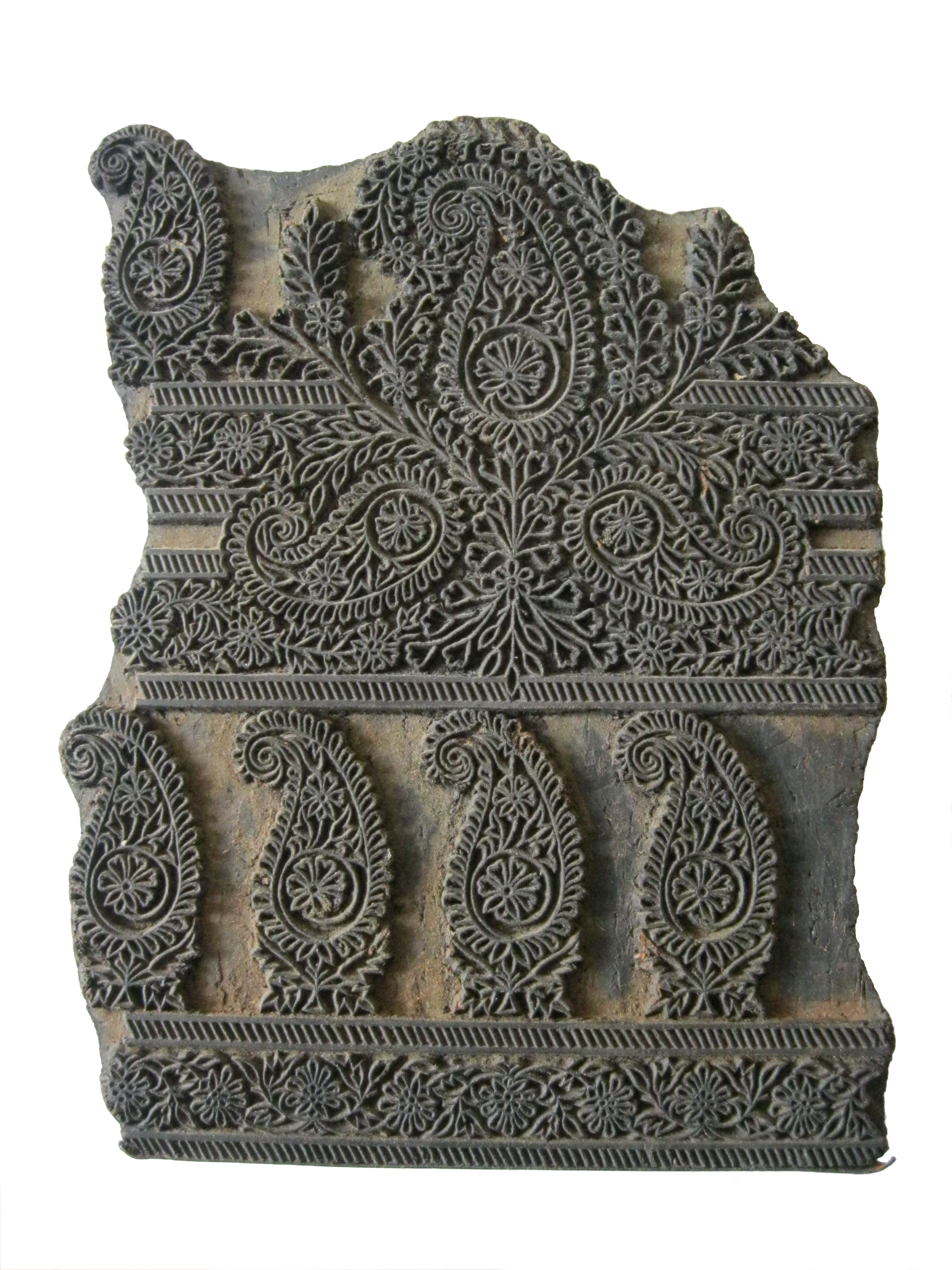
A traditional stencil used to block print fabrics

According to historians, the Chhipa were originally a warrior class or Kshatriya Rajput. They used to have a lifestyle similar to the Rajput in which physical activities such as hunting, and warfare were involved. It is said that once, according to the Hindu epic Mahabharata, Lord Parshuram while killing all the Kshatriyas to avenge their father, two brothers from the Rajput clan took refuge in a temple. one of the presiding deities hid behind the statue and it got its name from the literal 'hide' for the Hindi verb 'Chhipa'. Later Rajput boy printed cloth Or adopted the profession of dyer and he was not originally a Kshatriya. The genealogy of this Rajput child is the 'Chhipa's of today.

== Present circumstances ==
=== India ===
The community is classified as an OBC caste in the Indian states of Punjab, Haryana, Delhi, Rajasthan, Madhya Pradesh, and Uttar Pradesh.

=== Pakistan ===
The Chhipa community is settled in Karachi, Sindh, Pakistan.

== See also ==
- Muslim Chhipi
