= Bhishti =

Muslim tribe

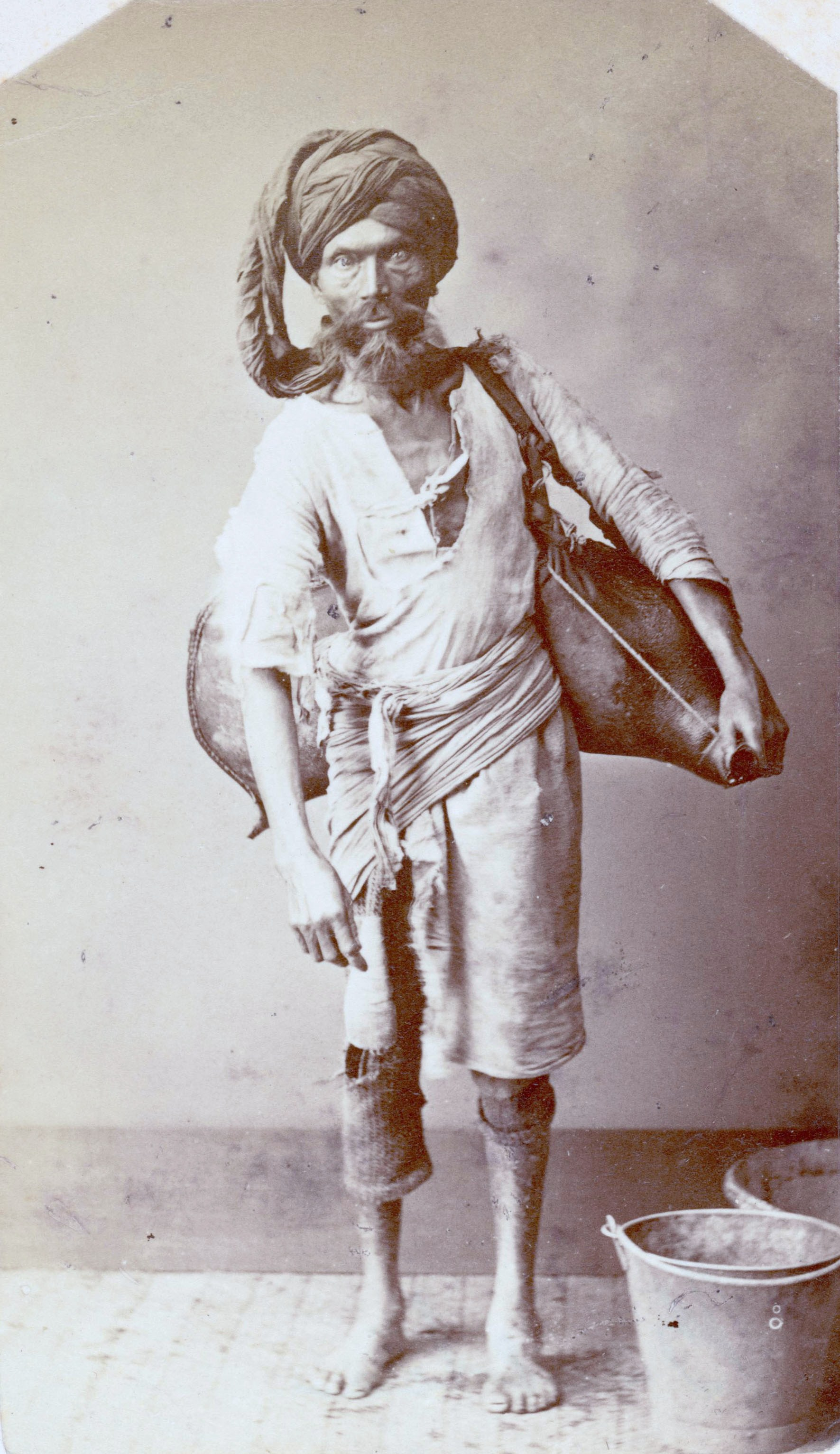
- A Bhishti in India, 1870

Regions with significant populations
- India • Pakistan

Languages
- Urdu • Hindi • Awadhi

Religion
- Islam

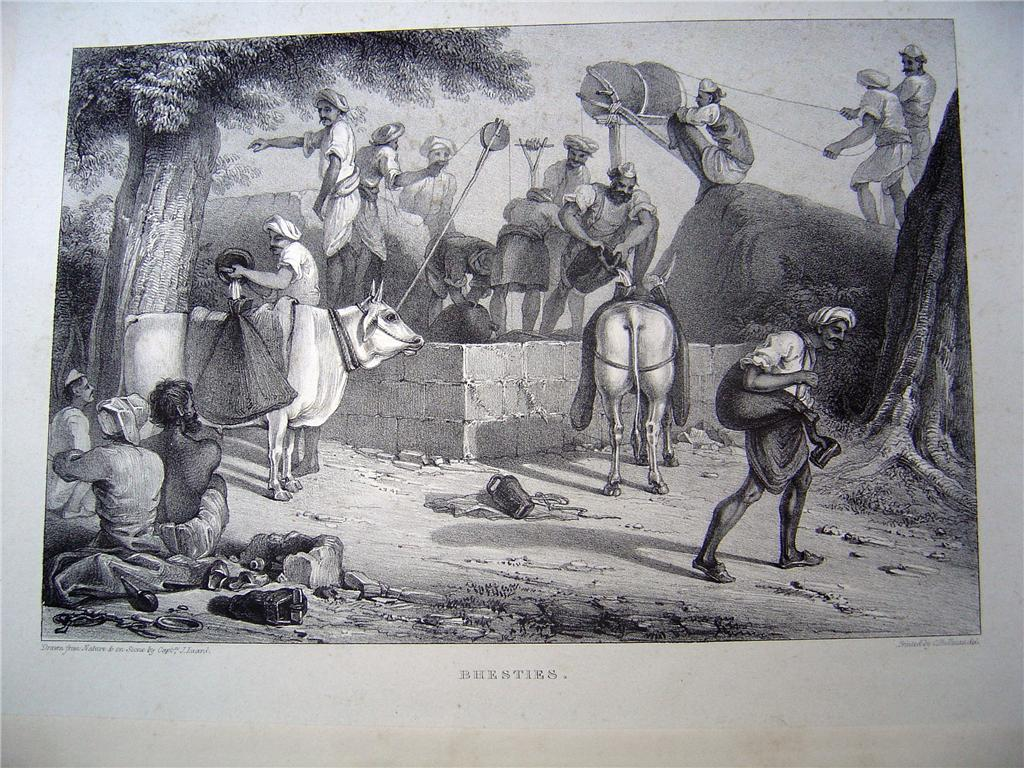
Bhesties, an 1838 illustration showing Bhishtis

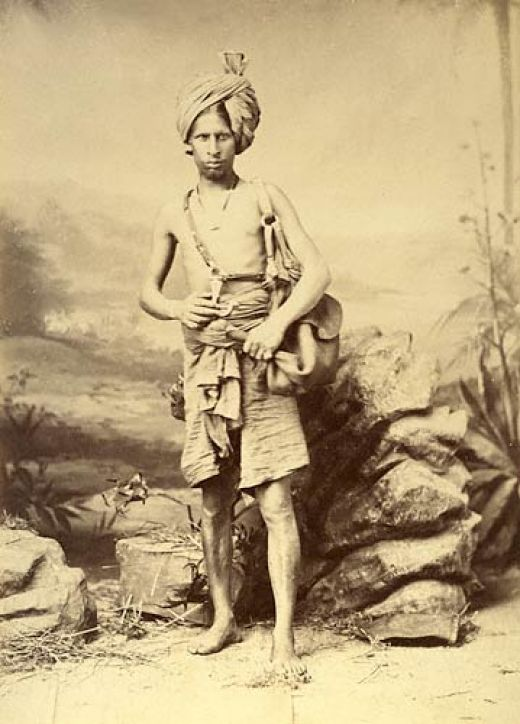
A Bhishti in 1880

The Bhishti or Bahishti are a Muslim tribe or biradari found in North India, Pakistan and Nepal. They are also known as Abbasi, Bahishti Abbasi, Sheikh Abbasi and Saqqa. They often use the surnames Abbasi or Sheikh Abbasi. Bhistis traditionally served as water-carriers.

== Origin ==
According to documentary film-maker Farha Khatun, some Bhistis claim that the first recorded Bhisti in history was Abbas ibn Ali who they refer to as "Hazrat Abbas". In 680 during the war being fought by Imam Husayn and his army in Damascus, Abbas died crossing the Furat river (Euphrates) to bring water to Husayn and his army.

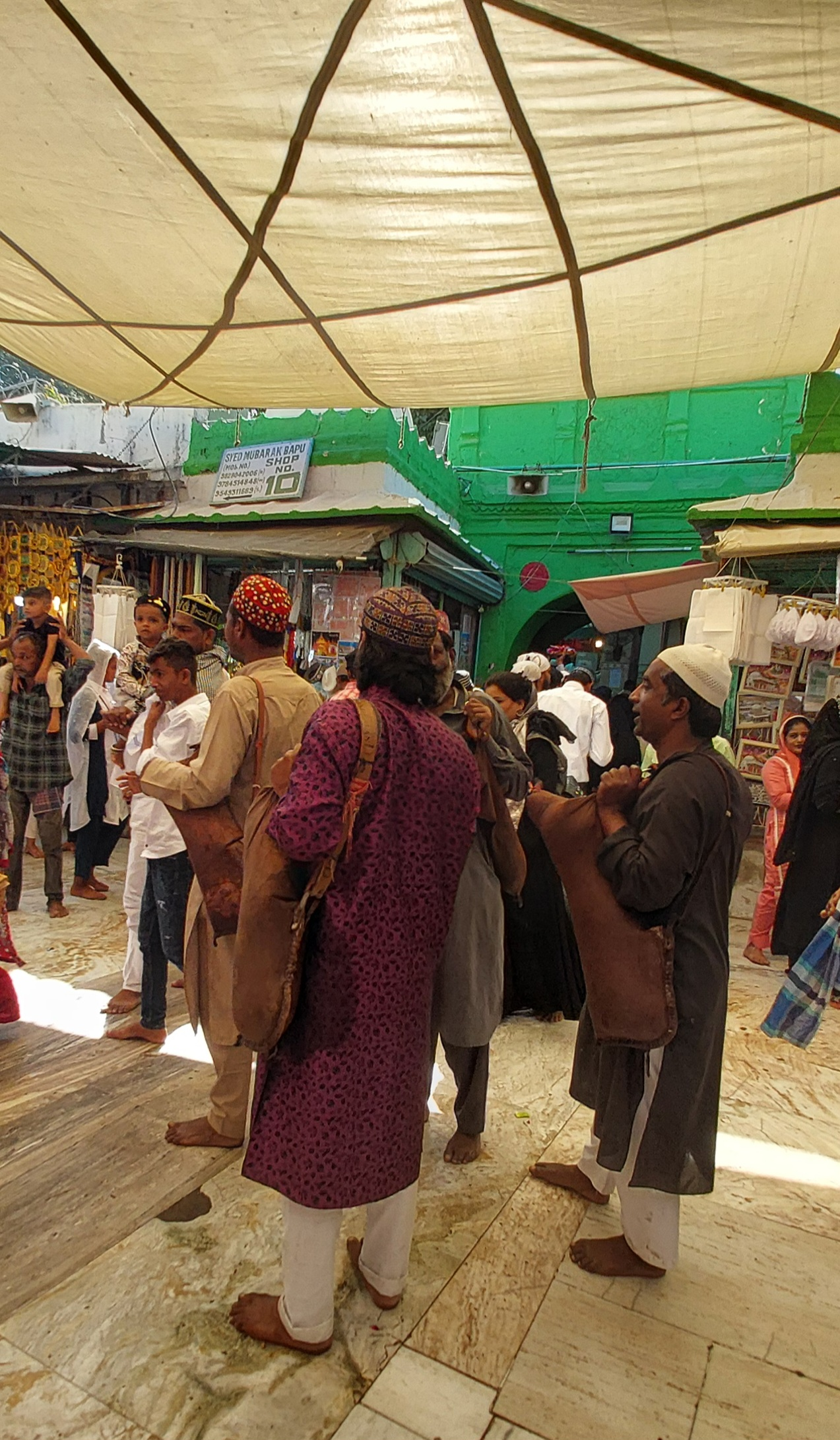
Bhistiwala in Ajmer Sharif Dargah, Rajasthan

Abbas ibn Ali was a son of the fourth Rashidun Caliph, Imam Ali. Ali was known for his bravery and devotion to Islam, which earned him numerous titles. One of them was 'Saqqa' or water-carrier, a honorific bestowed after the battle of Karbala in Iraq (680 CE), in which he sacrificed his life to fetch water for his half-brother Imam Hussain's children. The city of Lucknow is home to Dargah Hazrat Abbas, built to honour the sacrifice of the original water-bearer. During the Uprising of 1857, the shrine provided assistance to the Indian sepoys and Begum Hazrat Mahal. True to their origin on the battlefields of Karbala, the bhishtis continued to play an important role in the Subcontinent's military history through the Mughal and British eras. The water-bearers were a critical part of every major army retinue. In 1539, at the battle of Chausa in present-day Bihar, a bhishti saved Mughal emperor Humayun's life in the battle against Sher Shah Suri. This nameless hero inflated a mashak, so the Emperor crossed the Ganga on it and escaped to safety. He was rewarded with a day on the throne as imperial commendation for his bravery. The Bhisti is believed to have been laid to rest in one of the many unmarked graves at Ajmer Sharif Dargah.

== Bhishtis in British Indian Army ==
The actions of Bhistis under fire during military engagements have been noted in various accounts. During the distribution of honours following the Indian Mutiny, a Colonel of an English Cavalry regiment was reportedly asked to nominate a soldier who had shown exceptional bravery for consideration for the Victoria Cross. He selected the regimental Bhisti, citing his conduct as surpassing that of others in the unit. However, upon learning that a Bhisti was not eligible for the award, the Colonel declined to nominate an alternative, stating that while many had performed courageous acts, none matched the contributions of the water-carrier. As a result, the award was not conferred.

== Notable Bhishtis ==
- Rane Khan, Prominent chief of Maratha Army. He saved the life of Mahadaji Shinde during Third Battle of Panipat
- Nizam Bhishti, Ruled Mughal empire for a day, he saved the life of Mughal Emperor Humayun during Battle of Chausa 1539.

== In popular culture ==
- In the poem named Gunga Din by author Rudyard Kipling (most famous for writing The Jungle Book), Gunga Din is described as follows:

The finest man I knew
Was our regimental bhisti, Gunga Din.

- Oscar Browning from his book Impressions of Indian Travel, wrote
  For my own part I trust that if I am ever born again, in India, I may become a bhisti, or water-carrier. I am told that they are most excellent people. Does not Mr. Kipling's Gunga Din testify to the fact that their name is a title of honour? Certainly their occupation is most beneficent. With their mussack or goatskin on their back, they are always either watering the roads, or giving drink to animals, or refreshing the weary traveller.
- 'Ripples Under the Skin', is an intriguing title for a documentary film, by Farha Khatun, National Film Award winner.
