= Qassab =

Muslim ethnic group in north India

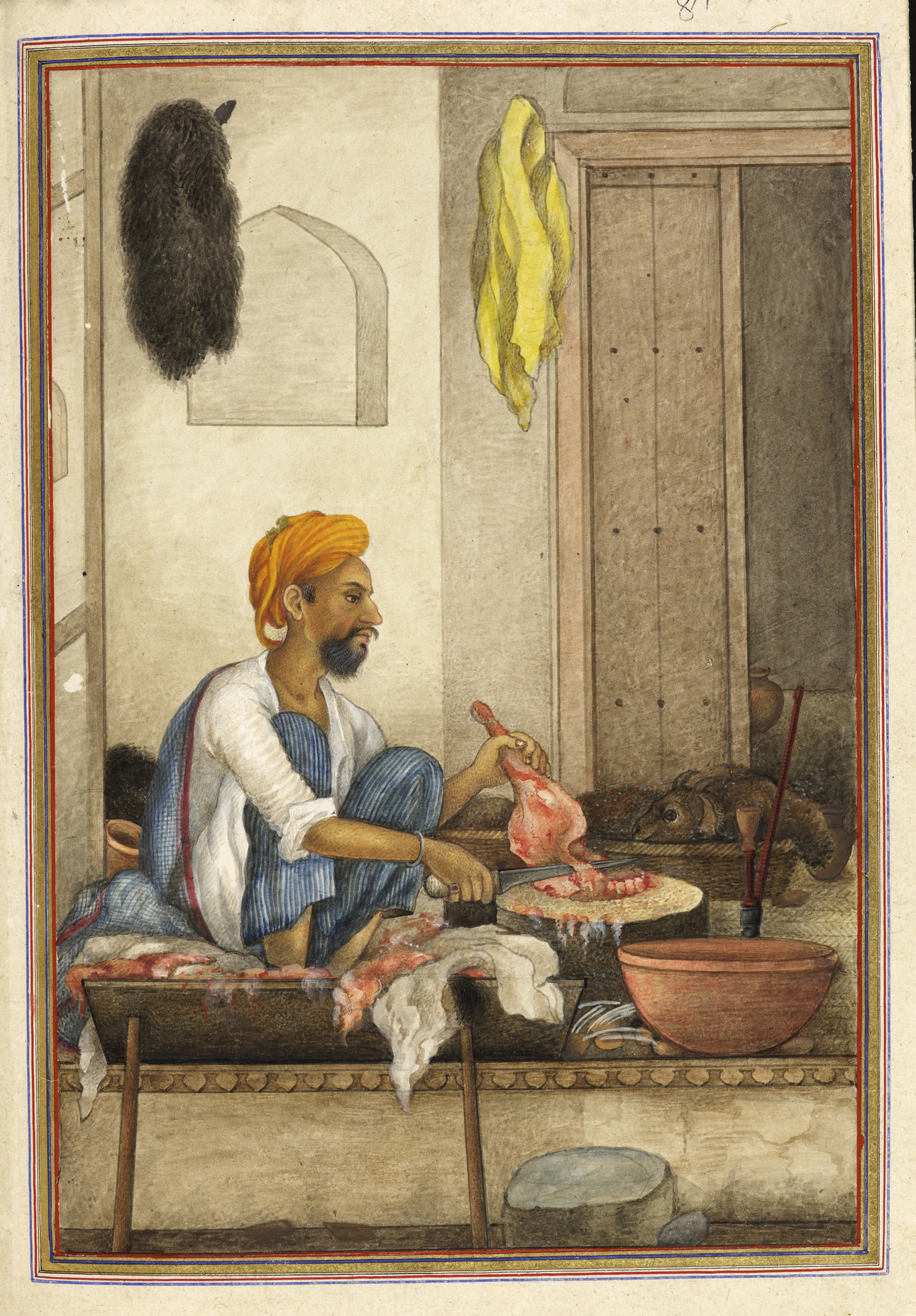
- Badhak or Qassab, the caste of butcher, 1825.

Regions with significant populations
- India

Languages
- Hindi; Urdu; Arabic; Sanskrit (historical)

Religion
- Islam

Related ethnic groups
- Qureshi

The Qassab (Hindi: कसाब; Urdu: قصاب; from the Arabic: قصاب, romanized: qaṣāb or Sanskrit: कसब, romanized: kasab, meaning butcher), are members of a North Indian community (biradari).

== History and origin ==
For their participation in the Indian Rebellion of 1857, a fine of Rs. 63,000 was imposed on the people of Rohtak who were mostly Ranghars, Shaikhs and Muslim Qassab.
