= Kunjra =

Community in India and Nepal

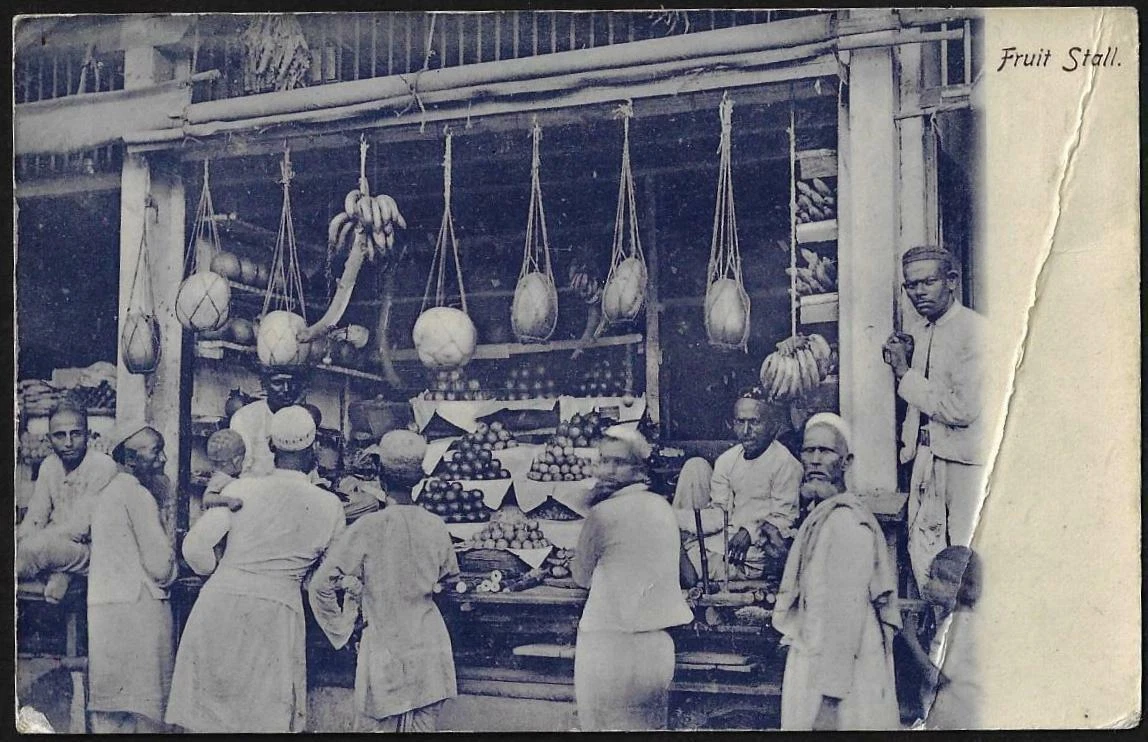
- Kunjra or Kabariya (Greengocer) – East Bengal c.1860s

Regions with significant populations
- India
- 1,828,584 (1.3988% of population of Bihar) (Note: According to 2022 Bihar caste-based survey)

Religion
- Islam

The Kunjra (pronounced as Koonjrda or Koonjda) are a community found in North India, Central India and Nepal.

== Present circumstances ==
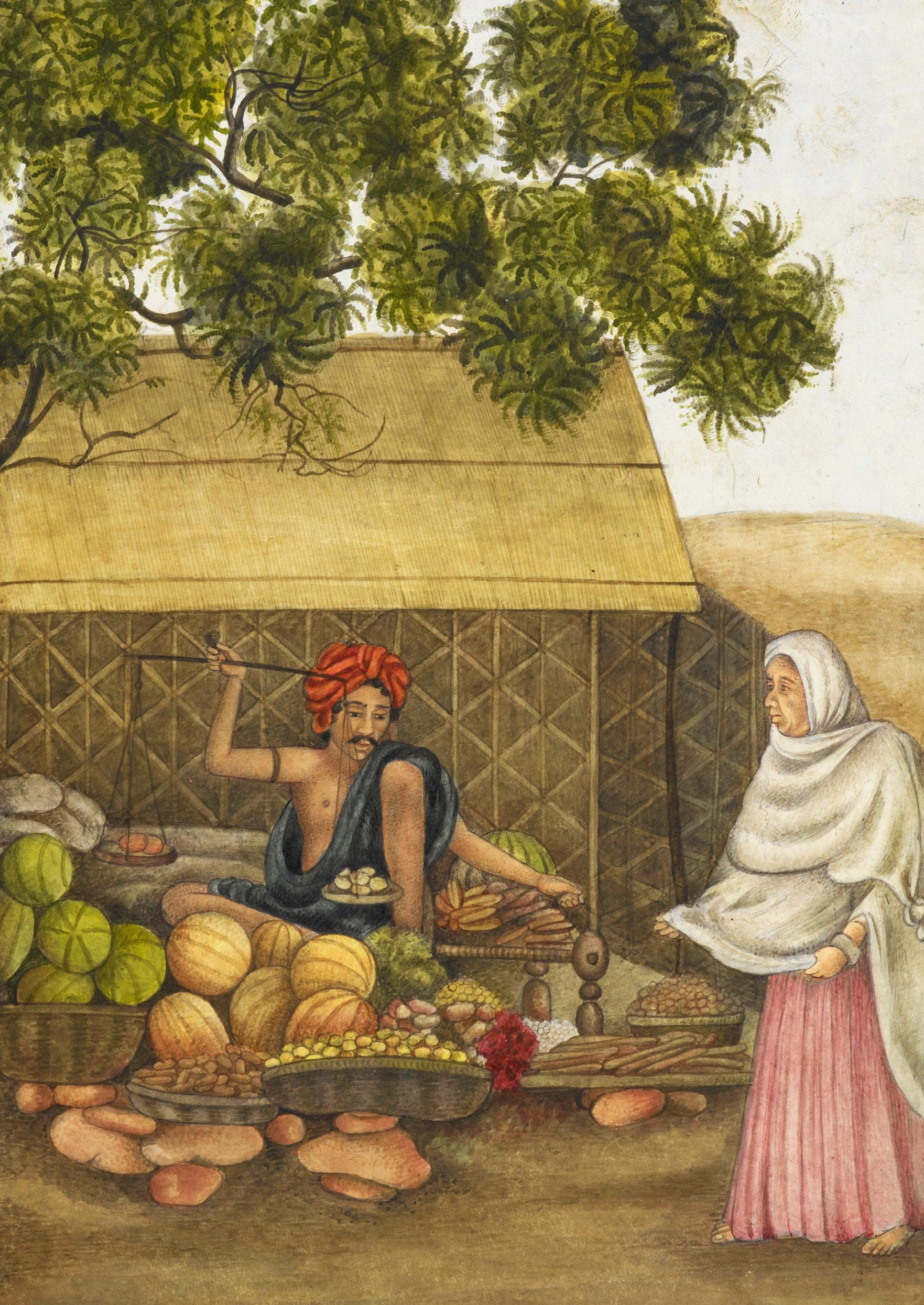
Kunjra, an occupational group represented by a greengrocer 1825

They are included in the Other Backward Class category in Delhi.
