= Mirshikar =

Muslim community in North India

Regions with significant populations
- India; Bangladesh; Pakistan; Afghanistan

Languages
- Urdu; Hindi

Religion
- Islam

The mirshikar are a Muslim community, found in North India, who were traditionally hunters and trappers of birds and small animals. Some were recorded as bird-catchers in Bihar around 1964. They can be found in Bihar and West Bengal.

== Practices ==
In one mirshikar community in Bihar, young men needed to prove themselves fit for marriage by catching a loha sarang, the black-necked stork known for being vicious. The practice was stopped when a boy was killed in the process.

Ali Hussain, from a mirshikar community in Manjhaul, is acclaimed for his work as a bird trapper for the Bombay Natural History Society. He worked with Salim Ali and other ornithologists to aid the marking and study of birds. In 1998, he was flown to Jackson County, Mississippi, US, and during his one-week visit, he demonstrated his trapping techniques and helped capture 10% of the sandhill crane population in the state. His method is now standard in crane research. In 1998, the Films Division of India recorded a documentary featuring Hussain.
