= Baghban =

Ethnic group

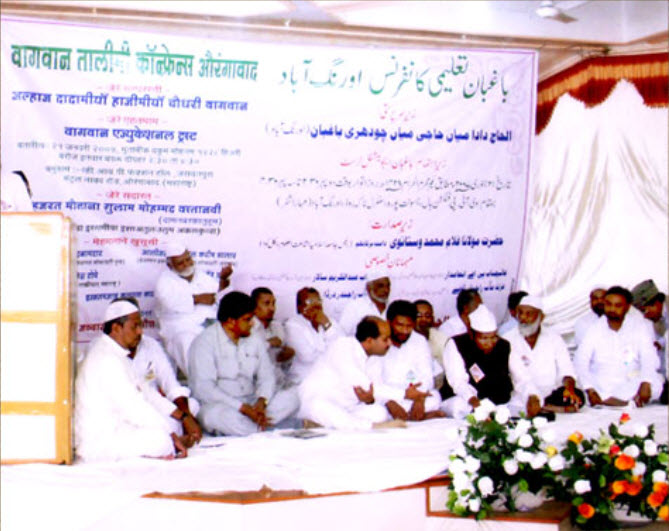
- Bagban Educational Conference 2007 at Aurangabad, Maharashtra

Languages
- Urdu

Religion
- Islam

The Baghban are a Muslim community, found in North India and in Pakistan. In the Deccan region they are known as Bagwan.
