= Muker tribe =

Muslim community in India and Nepal

Mukeri Tribe
Mikrani

Languages
- Urdu, Hindi, Bundelkhandi, Balochi, English, Bhojpuri, Angika

Religion
- Islam, Hanafi, Ashari, Sufism

Related ethnic groups
- Sheikh, Makrani, Balochi, Qureshi, Arab traders, Shaikh Banjara, Muqri, Barmaki, Siddiqui, Banjara (occupational parallel)

Mukeri, also known as Makrani, is a Muslim community and subcaste of the Sheikh caste primarily found in parts of India, Pakistan, and historically across the western Indian subcontinent. Traditionally, they have been associated with trade and transport, particularly in timber, grain, and cattle. The community traces its origins to Arab settlers, with a historical presence in the Makran region of present-day southern Balochistan, Iran, and Pakistan.

== Etymology and Origin ==
Community traditions hold that the name Muker is derived from the Arabic word makeri, meaning “those who assisted in the construction of Mecca.” Early members were reportedly called Makkai, meaning residents of Mecca, which gradually evolved into Makeri and later Muker or Mukeri.

In U.P & Bihar, the Muker trace their ancestry to early Arab settlers who are said to have entered South Asia through the Makran region (present-day southern Iran and Pakistan). According to this tradition, they settled in Bihar during the Khilji dynasty in the 13th century CE. Also referred to as Makrani, their name gradually evolved into Muker.

The community divided into two main endogamous groups:

- Mukeri
- Shaikh Banjara

The Shaikh Banjara subgroup is further divided into:

- Makrani
- Muqri
- Barmaki
- Siddiqui
- Shaikh

Each subgroup maintains its own distinct oral tradition. For instance, the Makrani subgroup claims Baluch ancestry, tracing their roots to the Makran coast in Balochistan, a historically important region for Arab migrations into South Asia.

Despite their nomadic and trading lifestyle, the Muker are not genealogically related to other Indian nomadic tribes such as the Lambhani (Lamani) or Banjara. These groups have distinct ethnic and linguistic backgrounds, although they may have shared trade routes or similar occupations historically. The confusion may stem from the Muker's occupational overlap with mobile merchant groups, but they are regarded as a culturally and historically separate community.

== Language and Culture ==
The Muker generally speak Urdu, Hindi and English as their primary language, with regional dialects like Angika in Bihar. In Uttar Pradesh, many also speak Hindi, Bundelkhandi or local Bhojpuri dialects.

Religiously, the Muker are Sunni Muslims, observing mainstream Islamic practices and festivals, including Eid al-Fitr, Eid al-Adha, and Milad-un-Nabi, while also incorporating regional customs into life-cycle rituals such as weddings and funerals.

== Traditional Occupations ==
Historically, the Muker have been long-distance traders, particularly in:

- Timber and wood transport
- Cattle and livestock trade
- Grain trading
- Ox-cart and caravan transport

These occupations placed them within the network of Muslim merchant communities across northern and western India. In this context, they have maintained cultural and occupational ties with other trading castes such as the Qureshi, though they are distinct in origin.

=== Modern Developments ===
In recent decades, the Muker community has undergone significant socio-economic change. While they were historically known for their roles as long-distance traders and transporters of timber, grain, and livestock, many members of the community have now settled in urban areas across India.

With improved access to education and employment, a growing number of Mukers have entered professional fields such as:

- Medicine
- Law
- Engineering
- Business
- Information Technology (IT)

This shift reflects broader trends within Indian Muslim communities, where traditional caste- or occupation-based identities are increasingly intersecting with modern economic aspirations and urban migration.

== Notable people ==
- Akbar Ali Mikrani (Ali Akbar Mikrani) – A former Chief Justice of the Appellate Court of Nepal and a current member of the Supreme Court Bar Association of Nepal.
- Aashiq Ali Mikrani: A Madheshi movement martyr in Nepal
- Ruhi Naze Mikrani: A Nepali politician and member of the House of Representatives.
- Kadu Makrani (c. 1841–1887): A 19th-century revolutionary who resisted British rule in Kathiawar, Gujarat, and was known for his opposition to the British and support for the poor.
- Natiq Makrani: A 13th-century Baloch writer, mystic, and poet who wrote in Balochi and Persian.
