= Manihar =

Muslim community in India

The Manihar are a Muslim community, found mainly in North India.

== History and origin ==
Manihar communities are found mainly in the Indian states of Gujarat, Madhya Pradesh, Rajasthan, and Uttar Pradesh.
