= Momin Ansari =

Indian Muslim merchant community

Regions with significant populations
- Pakistan • India • Nepal

Languages
- Urdu • Punjabi and Arabic

Religion
- Islam

Related ethnic groups
- Momin/Ansari

The Momin Ansari (Urdu: مومن أنصاري) are a Muslim community of merchants found mainly in India, Pakistan, and Nepal. The literal meaning of Ansar is "supporter" in Arabic.

In North India, the community are known as Ansari or Shaikh while in Maharashtra they are known as Momin.

Although the community can be found throughout the Indian subcontinent, the Varanasi District in Uttar Pradesh is always regarded by most Momin as the centre of their community. The Ansari are said to make up a third of that city's population. Important Ansari neighborhoods in the city include Madanpura, Adampura and Jaitpura.

They opposed the partition of India. They are listed in OBC list of Haryana.
