= Faqir (clan) =

Muslim ethnic group in India

The Shah Fakir are a Muslim community in South Asia. They are included in the Other Backward Caste list of the Indian states of Haryana and Himachal Pradesh.

== History and origin ==
The word fakir or faqir (Arabic: فقیر (noun of faqr)) is derived from the word faqr (Arabic: فقر, "poverty"). They are claimed to be the descendants of Sufi saints belonging to Syeds lineage traced to Ali. Faqirs were wandering Dervishes teaching Islam in South Asia.

== Shah Faqir of West Bengal ==
The Faqir of West Bengal are also known as Shahji. The majority of the West Bengal Faqir are now cultivators, living in multi-caste villages, in their own quarters known as Faqir paras. They cultivate paddy, jute, mustard and tilli seeds. A small number are also landless agricultural labourers. The Faqir speak Bengali and follow the Sunni sect of Islam. But they practice a number of folk beliefs, collectively referred to as faqirmat. This involves paying special reverence to a number of Sufi saints. A significant number of Faqir are also involved in the production of cooking oil, an activity traditionally associated with the Teli caste in other parts of India.They claim to be descendants of the Sayyids, descendants of Ali. Fakirs were wandering dervishes who taught Islam in South Asia. [ 3 ]
