= Sai (caste) =

Muslim community in India

The Sai, sometimes pronounced Sayee, are a Muslim community found in the states of Bihar and Uttar Pradesh in India. They are also known as the Sain.
