= Bihari Muslims =

Muslims of the eastern Indian state

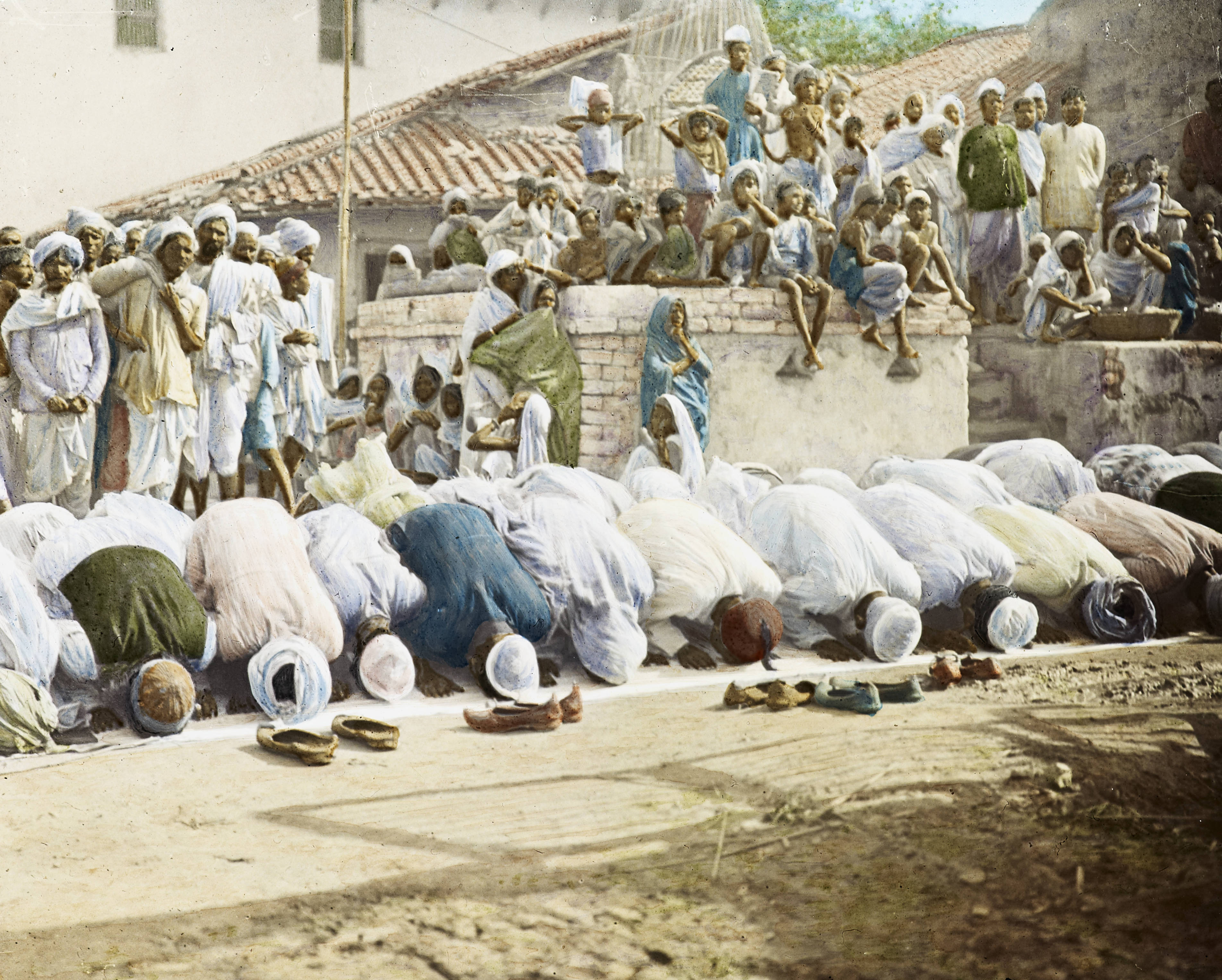
- Muslim men praying in Siwan district, Bihar, 1910

Total population
- c. 24.53 Million

Regions with significant populations
- India (Bihar only): 23,138,379
- Pakistan: 1,000,000
- Bangladesh: 400,000

Religions
- Islam Majority Sunni Minority Shia

Languages
- Urdu, various Bihari languages

Bihari Muslims are those adherents of Islam who identify linguistically, culturally, and genealogically as Biharis. They are geographically native to the region comprising the Bihar state of India, although there are significantly large communities of Bihari Muslims living elsewhere in the Indian subcontinent due to the partition of India in 1947, which prompted the community to migrate en masse from Bihar to the Dominion of Pakistan (both West Pakistan and East Pakistan).

Bihari Muslims make up a significant minority in Pakistan under the diverse community of Muhajirs (lit. 'migrants'), and largely began arriving in the country following the Bangladesh Liberation War of 1971, which led to the secession of East Pakistan from the Pakistani union as the independent state of Bangladesh.

The majority of Bihari Muslims adhere to the Sunni branch of Islam and the adoption of the religion by Biharis traces back to the 14th century, when Afghan traders and Sufi missionaries began to arrive in the region a century prior to the Mughal conquest of India. There are also a significant minority of Biharis who adhere to the Shia branch of Islam, largely residing in Patna and Gopalpur in Siwan, tracing their religious descent to Shia Muslim settlers of distant Persian ancestry from Lucknow in neighbouring Uttar Pradesh, who arrived in the region during the 19th century.

== History ==
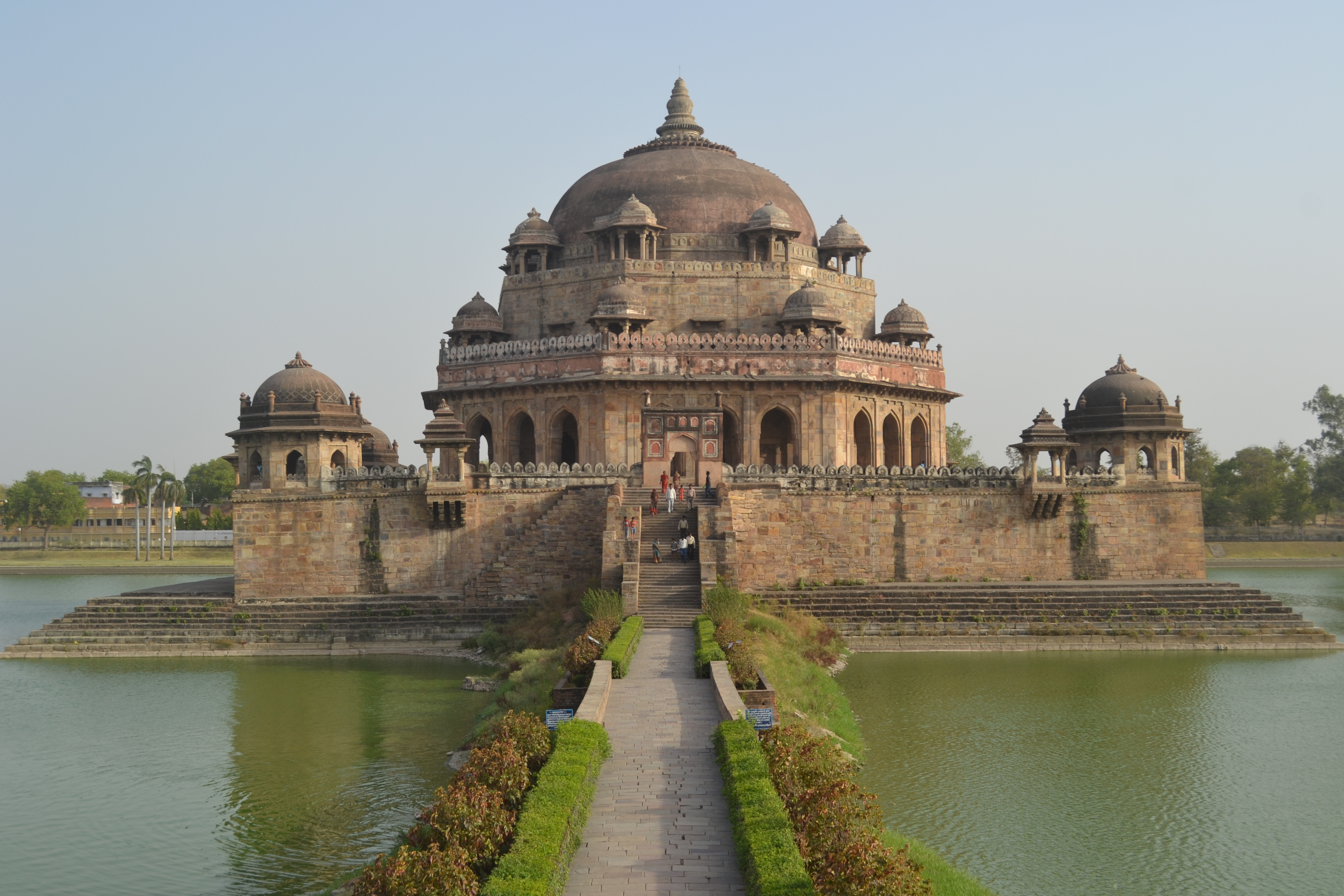
Sher Shah Suri Tomb in Sasaram. He was the founder of the Sur Empire and was born in Bihar to Pashtun parents.

The large-scale arrival of Muslims in Bihar began in the 14th century, when Turk traders and Sufi saints-warriors settled in the South Bihar plains and furthered the process of agricultural colonisation while also spreading Islam among the local populace. Muslims were not the only new immigrants to Bihar during this period. Inscriptions in Bihar Sharif tell of a Sufi warrior by the name of Malik Ibrahim Bayu who came to Bihar and defeated the non-Hindu Kol tribe who had been oppressing the local Muslims. He conquered many Kol chiefdoms.

Some of the kings and chieftains of medieval Bihar were Muslim. The chieftaincy of Kharagpur Raj in modern-day Munger district was originally controlled by Hindu Rajputs. In 1615 after a failed rebellion by Raja Sangram Singh, his son, Toral Mal converted and he changed his name to Roz Afzun.

The Faujdars of Purnea (also known as the Nawabs of Purnea) created an autonomous territory for themselves under the leadership of Saif Khan and ruled in parts of Eastern Bihar in the early 1700s. They were engaged in a protracted conflict with the neighbouring Kingdom of Nepal.

Many Bihari Muslims migrated to West Pakistan and East Pakistan (now Bangladesh) after the 1946 Bihar riots following partition of India in 1947. In the context of the 1971 war in Bangladesh, Biharis were seen as collaborators of the Pakistan Army and subjected to violence of all sorts. They then sought refuge in Pakistan. While the 1973–74 Delhi Agreement facilitated the repatriation of some refugees, only 144,800 non-Bengalis were repatriated to Pakistan, with over 258,000 left awaiting relocation. In Pakistan, many settled in Karachi's low-income neighbourhoods such as Orangi Town, Korangi Town, Musa Colony, and others. However, these communities remained vulnerable, particularly during ethnic conflicts like the Qasba-Aligarh Colony Massacre in 1986. Repatriation efforts slowed significantly after 1982, with only 15,000 Biharis resettled in Pakistan by then. A brief resumption in 1993 resulted in the transfer of just 53 families before protests halted the process again. This has led to the issue of stranded Pakistanis in Bangladesh. In Bangladesh, Biharis faced legal and social barriers to citizenship. It was not until a 2008 Supreme Court ruling that Biharis born after 1971, or who were minors at the time, were granted Bangladeshi citizenship and voting rights.

The 1989 Bhagalpur violence was one of the deadliest episodes of communal rioting in post-independence India. Beginning in October 1989 in Bhagalpur and spreading to nearby villages, the violence lasted nearly two months, killing over 1,000 people, most of them Muslims, and displacing thousands, leaving a lasting impact on Indian Bihari Muslims.

== Distribution by district ==
The following table shows the Muslim population by districts of Bihar.

No.	District	Population (2001)	Muslim population	Percentage
1	Kishanganj	1,796,348	1,123,456	68%
2	Katihar	2,392,638	1,024,678	43%
3	Araria	2,158,608	887,972	42%
4	Purnia	2,543,942	935,239	38%
5	Darbhanga	3,295,789	748,971	23%
6	Sitamarhi	2,682,720	568,992	21%
7	West Champaran	3,043,466	646,597	21%
8	East Champaran	3,939,773	755,005	19%
9	Bhagalpur	2,423,172	423,246	18%
10	Madhubani	3,575,281	941,579	18%
11	Siwan	2,714,349	494,176	18%
12	Gopalganj	2,152,638	367,219	17%
13	Supaul	1,732,578	302,120	17%
14	Sheohar	515,961	80,076	16%
15	Muzaffarpur	4,746,714	752,358	15%
16	Saharsa	1,508,182	217,922	14%
17	Begusarai	2,349,366	313,713	13%
18	Banka	1,608,773	190,051	12%
19	Gaya	3,473,428	403,439	13%
20	Jamui	1,398,796	170,334	12%
21	Nawada	1,809,696	204,457	11%
22	Madhepura	1,526,646	173,605	11%
23	Aurangabad	2,013,055	221,436	11%
24	Kaimur	1,289,074	123,048	10%
25	Khagaria	1,280,354	131,441	10%
26	Rohtas	2,450,748	246,760	10%
27	Samastipur	3,394,793	355,897	10%
28	Saran	3,248,701	337,767	10%
29	Vaishali	2,718,421	259,158	10%
30	Jehanabad	1,514,315	124,149	8%
31	Munger	1,337,797	98,791	7.4%
32	Patna	4,718,592	366,164	8%
33	Bhojpur	2,243,144	163,193	7%
34	Nalanda	2,370,528	176,871	7%
35	Sheikhpura	525,502	37,755	7%
37	Buxar	1,402,396	86,382	6%
38	Lakhisarai	802,225	35,378	4%

Sum total of this table is 14,780,500 Muslims out of 83.0 million total population in 2001 census, hence Muslims were 16.5% of total population in Bihar. In 2011 census, total population grew to 103.9985 million, of which 16.9% or 17,557,809 were Muslims. During 2001–2011, Muslims grew by 33.433%, while non-Muslims grew by 23.537%. District-wise break up by religions for 2011 is not available.

Kishanganj is the only district in Bihar with a Muslim majority.

== Muslim communities ==
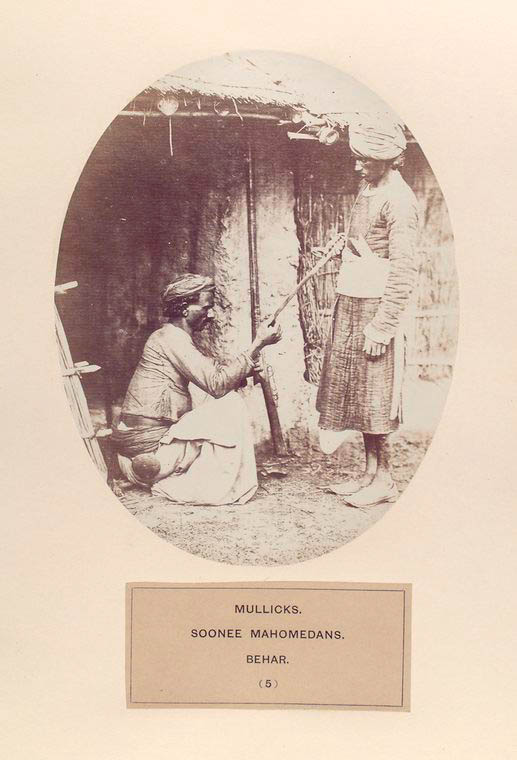
Mullick, Soonee Mahomedan, Behar.

- Malik
- Julahas
- Sheikh of Bihar
- Surjapuri (Bhuiyan)
- Kunjra or Rayeen
- Shershabadia
- Muslim Bhumihars
- Pathans of Bihar
- Darzi or Idrisi
- Kulhaiya
- Muslim Kayasths
- Muslim Rajputs
  - Thakurai
  - Malkana
  - Khanzada
- Abdal
- Muslim Chhipi
- Lal Begi or Lala Baig
- Turuk Pasi/Pashai
- Sayyid/Syed
- Chik
- Sai
- Muslim Rangrez
- Iraqi or Kalal

In common with the rest of India, the Muslims in Bihar are largely descendants of native converts from various castes. The rise of the Indian Muslim population can be traced back to the early 12th century, with many conversions to Islam taking place during the rule of the Sur Empire, which had established its capital in Sasaram.

== Statistics ==
As per the 2022 Bihar caste-based survey, the population of major Muslim castes in Bihar was as follows:

Caste	Categorization	Population	Population as a percentage of total population of Bihar
Shaikh	General	4995897	3.821675389
Momin (Muslim) (Julaha/Ansari)	EBC	4634245	3.545025061
Surjapuri Muslim (except Shaikh, Syed, Mallick, Mirza, Baig, Mughal, Pathan) (only for Purnia, Katihar, Kishangunj and Araria districts)	BC	2446212	1.871261196
Dhuniya (Muslim)	EBC	1888192	1.444396651
Rayeen or Kunjra (Muslim)	EBC	1828584	1.398798748
Shershahbadi	EBC	1302644	0.99647421
Kulhaiya	EBC	1253781	0.959095832
Pathan (Khan)	General	986665	0.754762027
Sai/Faqeer/Diwan/Madar (Muslim)	EBC	663197	0.507321038
Dhobi (Muslim)	EBC	409796	0.313478698
Idrisi or Darzi (Muslim)	EBC	329661	0.252178404
Syed	General	297975	0.227939792
Chudihar (Muslim)	EBC	207914	0.159046477
Thakurai (Muslim)	EBC	147482	0.112818245
Qasab (Qasai) (Muslim)	EBC	133807	0.102357378
Bhat (Muslim)	BC	89052	0.068121468
Madariya (Muslim) (only for Sanhaul block of Bhagalpur and Dhoriya block of Banka)	BC	86658	0.066290147
Daphali (Muslim)	EBC	73259	0.05604041
Mehtar, Lalbegi, Halalkhor, Bhangi (Muslim)	EBC	69914	0.05348161
Morshikar	EBC	66607	0.050951878
Pamaria (Muslim)	EBC	64890	0.049638437
Muslim Nats	EBC	61629	0.047143893
Gaddi	BC	57617	0.044074862
Mukairi (Muslim)	EBC	56522	0.043237228
Cheeq (Muslim)	EBC	50404	0.038557185
Jat Muslim (Madhubani, Darbhanga, Sitamarhi, Khagaria and Araria)	BC	44949	0.034384313
Rangrez (Muslim)	EBC	43347	0.033158843
Bakho (Muslim)	EBC	36830	0.02817358
Bhathiyara (Muslim)	EBC	27263	0.020855181
Saikalgarg (Muslim)	EBC	18936	0.014485336
Qadar	EBC	18121	0.013861891
Miriyasin (Muslim)	EBC	15415	0.011791902
Nalband (Muslim)	EBC	11900	0.009103057
Madari (Muslim)	EBC	11620	0.008888868
Abdal	EBC	11433	0.00874582
Itfarosh/Itafarosh/Gadheri/Itpaz Ibrahimi (Muslim)	EBC	9462	0.007238078
Qalandar	EBC	7873	0.006022552
Qaghzi	BC	2360	0.001805312

The Iraqi/Kalal was counted as a subset of Bania caste. Prominent members of the Kalal community had protested against the state government and demanded a separate categorisation.

== Culture ==
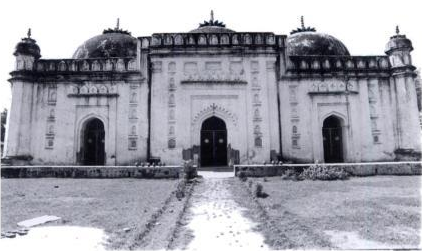
1920 Black and white photograph of the Bukhari Mosque in Bihar Sharif, Bihar, India

=== Traditional Dress ===
Among Bihari Muslims, traditional attire reflects a blend of Islamic modesty and regional cultural aesthetics. One notable example is the chaapa dress, commonly worn by Bihari Muslim women, particularly in rural and semi-urban areas. The term chaapa (from Hindi/Urdu: छाप/چاپ) means "print" or "stamp," referring to the block-printed or hand-stamped designs featured on these garments.

Chaapa dresses are typically made of cotton and are adorned with floral, paisley, or geometric motifs in vibrant colours. The outfit usually consists of a long tunic (kurta), a lower garment such as a salwar or lehenga, and a matching dupatta. These dresses prioritise comfort and modesty while showcasing local textile traditions. Although machine-printed versions have become common, traditional hand-block printed chaapa fabrics continue to be worn on festive and religious occasions.

The chaapa dress is an example of how Bihari Muslim clothing preserves local artisanal techniques while expressing cultural and religious identity.

=== Food ===
Bihari Muslim food culture is a part of Bihari cuisine that combines local agricultural traditions with Islamic culinary influences brought by Persian, Afghan, and Mughal contacts. It is known for its strong non-vegetarian dishes, festive and wedding foods, and everyday staples rooted in regional taste like Bihari Kabab, Pulao Gosht, Sheer Chai, Kofta, Baqer Khani, Qeemami Sewai, Zarda and Makuti.

=== Festivals ===
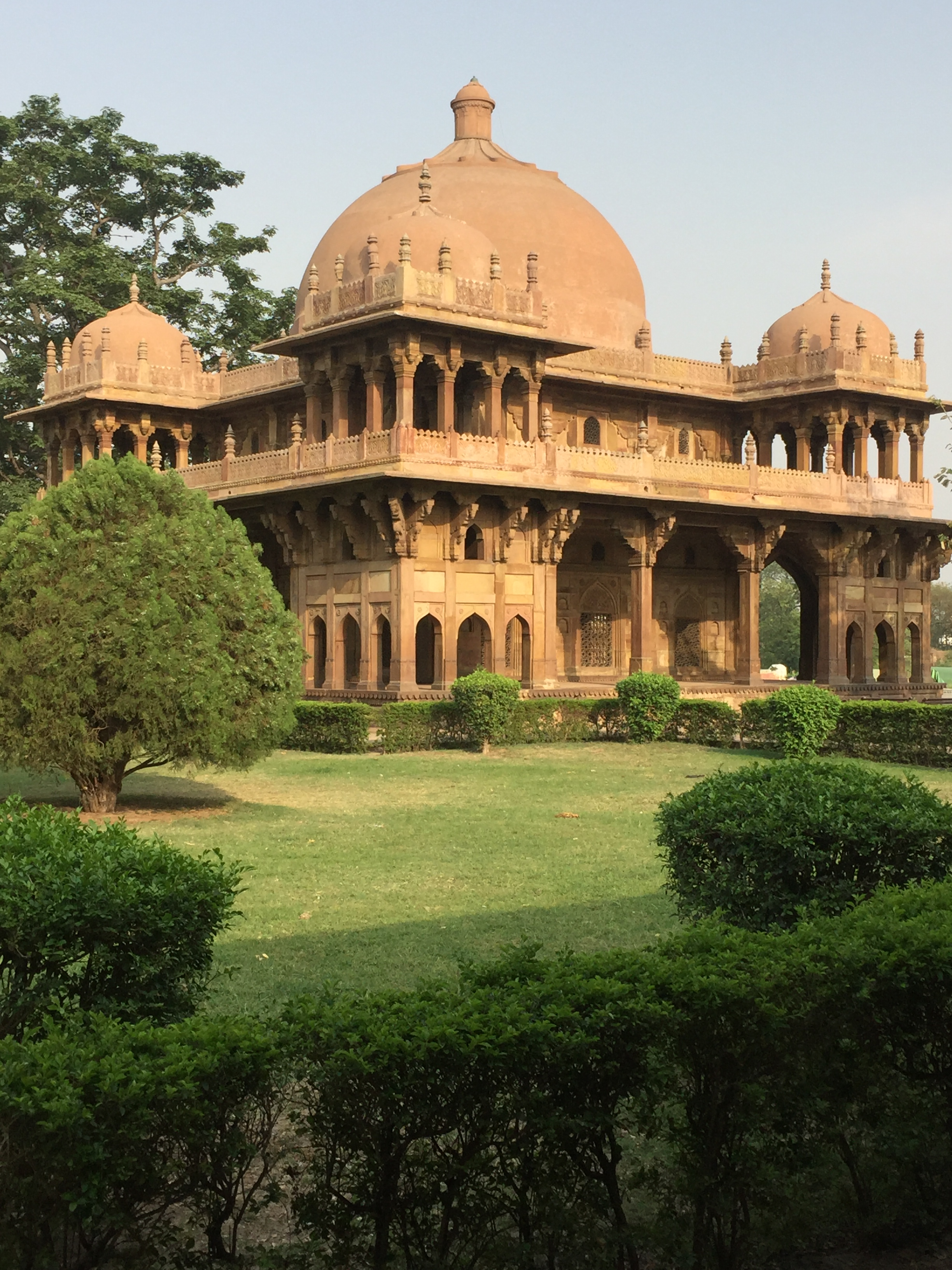
The Tomb of Shah Daulat, a major Sufi shrine in Patna

They celebrate major Islamic festivals such as Eid al-Fitr and Eid al-Adha. They also celebrate Shab-e-Barat and Eid Milad-un-Nabi. Muharram is uniquely observed by both Shia and Sunni Muslims, with Sunni Bihari Muslims also participating in taziya processions and mourning rituals. During Muharram, especially on Ashura, Muslim Julaha communities of Bihar perform the "Jharni Dance". It is a ritual form of dance and song in which participants move in a circle and rhythmically strike split bamboo sticks to create a distinct beat. Urs Mela are an important part of Bihari Muslim religious life, commemorating the death anniversaries of revered Sufi saints. Major Urs gatherings are held at shrines such as Makhdoom Yahya Maneri in Maner Sharif and Sharfuddin Ahmed Yahya Maneri in Bihar Sharif, attracting thousands of devotees from all over India and World.

=== Literature ===
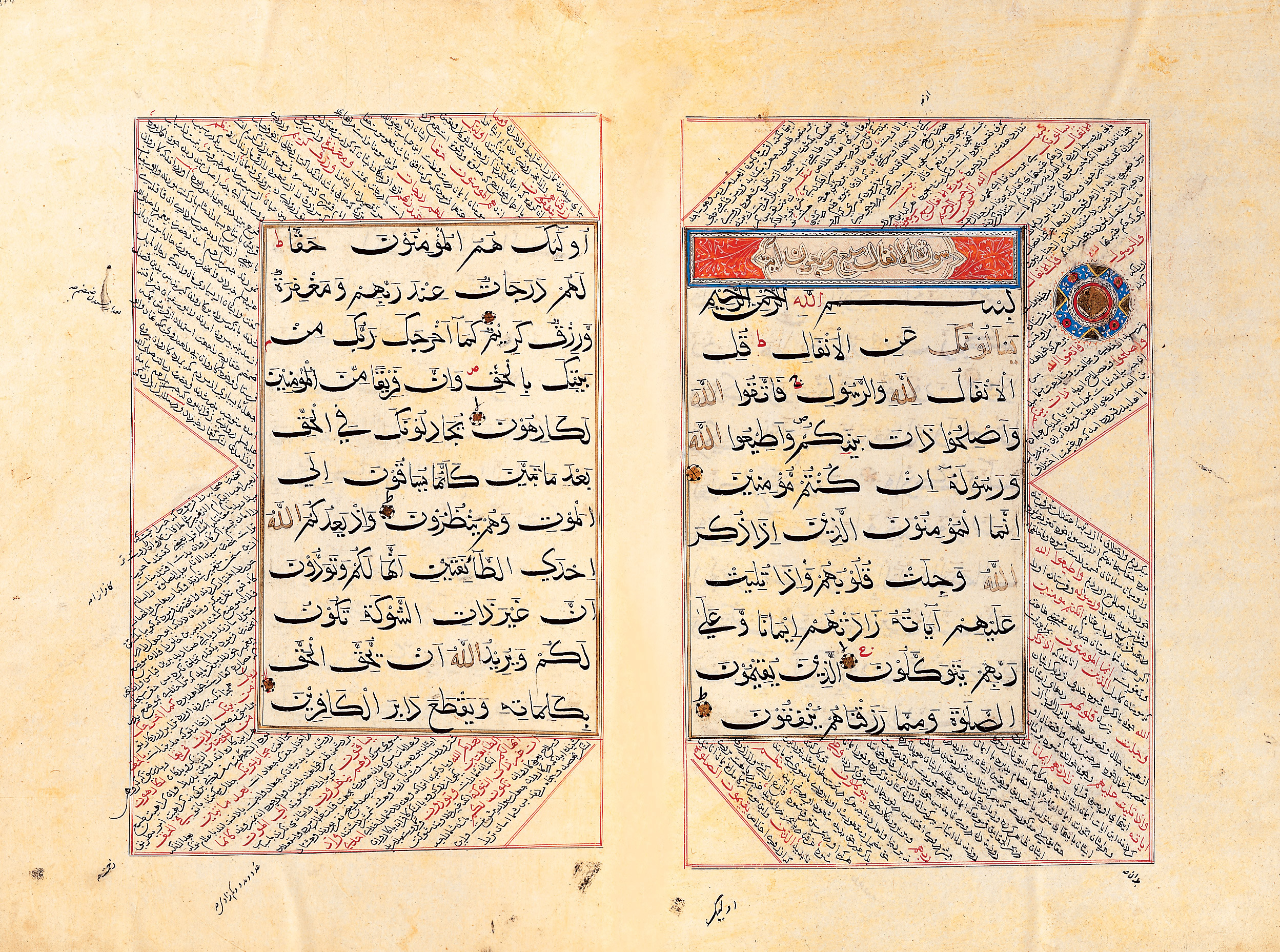
A 16th-century Qur’an from India written in Bihari script, accompanied by Persian commentary.

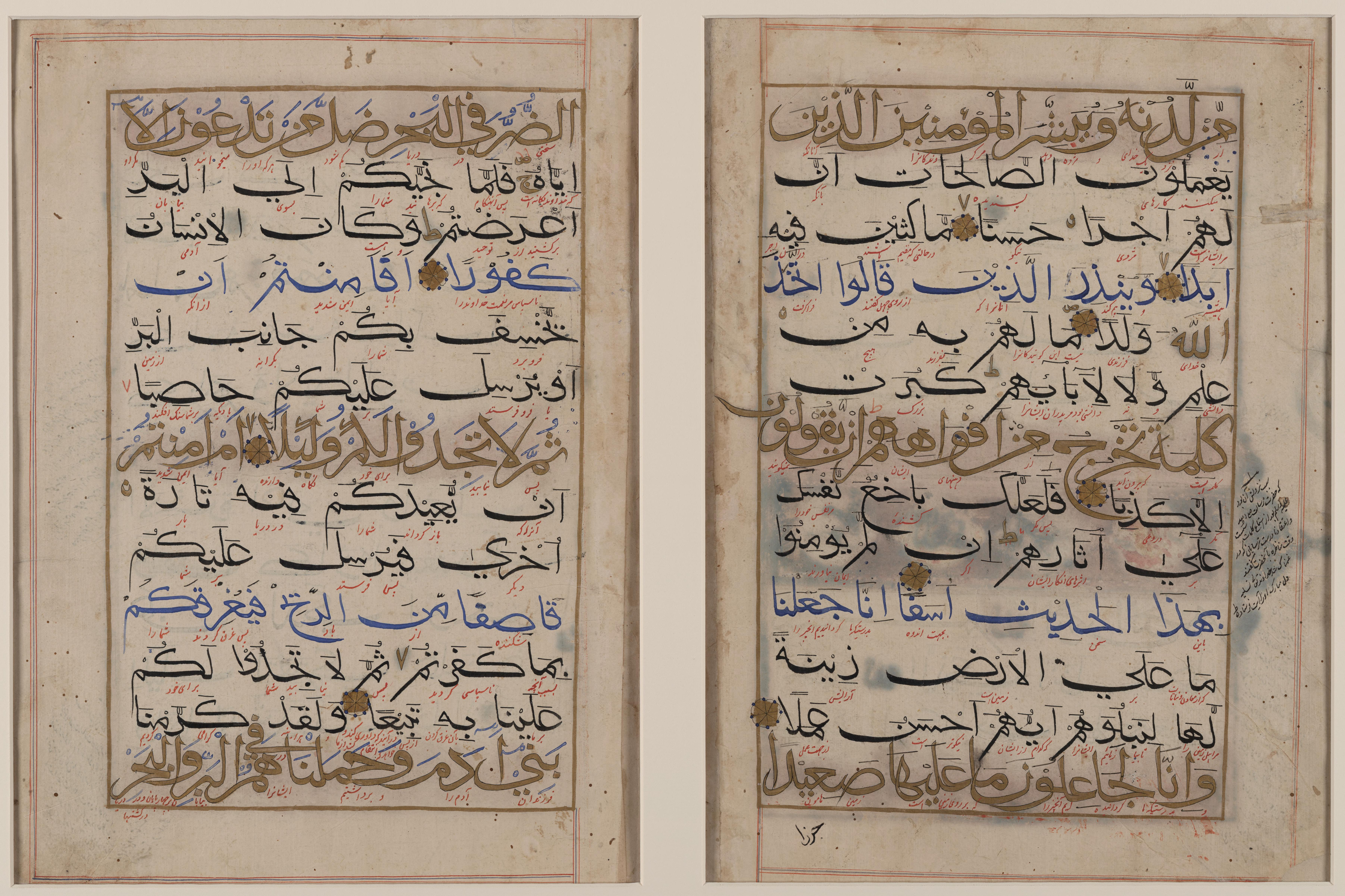
Folio from a Quran in Bihari script

Bihari Muslims have made significant contributions to Urdu and Persian literature, particularly from historic centres such as Patna. Renowned poets like Shad Azimabadi, Bismil Azimabadi, Hussain Ul Haque and Kalim Aajiz played an important role in the development of Urdu poetry and literary culture. Rasheed-Un-Nisa was the first female novelist from Bihar. She authored the Urdu novel Islaah-Un-Nisa, although her name was not originally credited as the author in the book. Muslims in Bihar also established important libraries and literary institutions that promoted education and intellectual life, most notably the Khuda Bakhsh Oriental Public Library in Patna, founded in 1891 by Khan Bahadur Khuda Bakhsh. It houses one of the richest collections of Arabic, Persian, and Urdu manuscripts in India. Other institutions, such as Madrasa libraries and private collections maintained by scholars, also contributed to preserving Islamic scholarship and Indo-Muslim literary traditions in the region.

Bihari calligraphy is a distinctive Islamic script that developed in the Bihar region around the 14th century, characterised by a blend of angular and cursive forms. It is noted for its thick, wedge-shaped horizontal strokes, thin vertical lines, and horizontal diacritical marks. The script was primarily used for writing religious texts, especially Quranic Manuscripts, and was widely employed in pre-Mughal India. Although its use declined by the late 16th century, examples of Bihari script continued to appear in manuscripts up to the 18th and 19th centuries. Similar stylistic features have also been observed in some Quranic manuscripts from regions such as Harar, indicating possible artistic connections within the broader Islamic world.

== Education ==
Education among Bihari Muslims developed through both traditional Islamic institutions and modern educational reforms. Traditionally, children received religious education in maktab and madrasas, where they studied the Qur’an and Islamic jurisprudence (fiqh). These institutions played an important role in preserving Islamic scholarship, religious learning, and community identity in the region. In 1868, the Bihar Scientific Society was established mainly through the efforts of Imdad Ali in Muzaffarpur, influenced by the Aligarh Movement. The society also launched a fortnightly newspaper, Akhbarul Akhyar and aimed to spread Western scientific knowledge among the local population through vernacular languages. It encouraged the translation of scientific books on modern secular subjects such as mathematics, chemistry, botany, geography, and medicine, and also supported the establishment of schools where these subjects could be taught.

The Bihar Madrasa Examination Board was established in 1922 following the recommendations of the Mohammedan Education Committee (1920) to improve the educational condition of Muslims in Bihar. The initiative was led by Syed Mohammad Fakhruddin, the first Education Minister of Bihar, with Justice Nurul Hoda as the first chairman and Dr. Azimuddin Ahmed as secretary. Fakhruddin played an important role in promoting modern education in the region of all community.

Muslim literacy in India is about 67.6%, lower than the national average of 74.04%, and the situation in Bihar is even weaker. In Bihar, Muslim literacy is approximately 42%, with 51.8% male literacy and 31.5% female literacy, both well below the state averages. Rural Muslim literacy (38.68%) is also significantly lower than urban literacy (64.34%). Several districts such as Kishanganj, Araria, and Katihar have particularly low literacy rates among Muslims, while districts like Patna, Rohtas, and Munger show relatively higher levels. The report also notes that many Muslim-concentrated villages lack basic educational infrastructure which contributes to low enrollment rates. Factors such as poverty, limited access to institutions, and social barriers further restrict educational participation among Muslims in the state.

== Role in Politics ==
=== Pre-independence ===
Mohammad Yunus served as the first Premier of Bihar Province under British India from 1 April to 19 July 1937. Elected to the Bihar Legislative Council from the West Patna (Rural) constituency on the Abul Muhasin Muhammad Sajjad's Muslim Independent Party ticket, his party secured 20 of the 40 Muslim-reserved seats, while the Congress won four. Yunus sought to form a coalition with the Congress to demonstrate Hindu–Muslim political cooperation, but the proposal was declined. He subsequently headed a short-lived minority government until it fell, after which a Congress ministry led by Shri Krishna Sinha, with Anugrah Narayan Sinha as deputy, assumed office on 20 July 1937.

Leaders like Mazharul Haque, Abdul Qaiyum Ansari, Maghfoor Ahmad Ajazi, Aasim Bihari and organisation like All India Jamhur Muslim League and All India Momin Conference and Majority of Bihari Muslims Opposed the partition of India.

=== Post-independence ===
Abdul Ghafoor served as the 13th Chief Minister of Bihar from 2 July 1973 to 11 April 1975 and remains the only Muslim to have held the office in post-Independence Bihar. He later became Union Minister for Urban Development in the Rajiv Gandhi government in 1984. During his parliamentary career, he was elected to the Lok Sabha three times in 1984, 1991, and 1996 representing the Congress and later the Samata Party. During the 1990s, following the rise of Lalu Prasad Yadav in Bihar politics, leaders such as Mohammad Shahabuddin emerged as influential Muslim political strongman from Siwan, Bihar. A prominent political figure, he served twice as a Member of the Legislative Assembly of Bihar and four times as a Member of Parliament. He was later convicted in multiple criminal cases. The M-Y (Muslim-Yadav) political alliance between Muslim and Yadav voters was consolidated by Lalu Prasad Yadav from the early 1990s to the early 2000s. This social coalition became the core electoral base of the Rashtriya Janata Dal and played a crucial role in its long-term political dominance in Bihar. A section of Muslims in Bihar shifted their support to Nitish Kumar and his party, the Janata Dal (United), particularly during his tenure as chief minister after 2005. His government’s initiatives, including reopening cases related to the 1989 Bhagalpur riots, providing compensation to victims, and introducing reservations for Pasmanda Muslims in local bodies, helped build trust among sections of the Muslim community. These measures contributed to Nitish Kumar gaining significant Muslim support despite his alliance with the Bharatiya Janata Party.

The Pasmanda movement originated in Bihar in the 1990s under the leadership of Ali Anwar to address caste-based inequalities among Muslims, particularly the marginalization of Dalit Muslim and backward-caste groups. He started Pasmanda Muslim Mahaz organisation in 1998 to challenged the dominance of upper-caste Ashraf elites and demanded social justice, political representation, and inclusion in affirmative action.

Muslims constitute about 17–18% of Bihar’s population and have historically been a key electoral constituency, particularly concentrated in the Seemanchal region. Muslim political representation in Bihar has declined in recent years, with only 11 Muslim Members of the Legislative Assembly (MLAs) in 2025.

== Notable Bihari Muslims ==
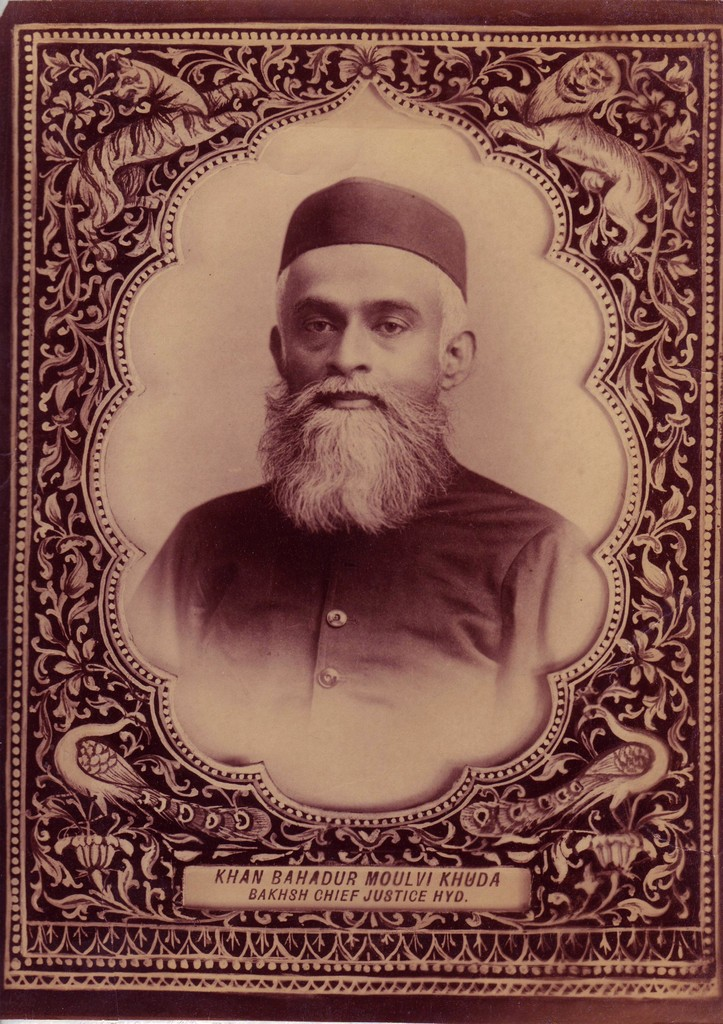
Khan Bahadur Khuda Bakhsh

- Aasim Bihari - 20th century social activist from Bihar Sharif
- Abu Bakr Ahmad Haleem - Pakistani political scientist and the first vice-chancellor of Karachi University.
- Abul Kalam Qasmi - Indian scholar, literary critic, and a poet of the Urdu language
- Abul Kalam Qasmi Shamsi - Indian Islamic scholar, author, essayist
- Abul Mahasin Muhammad Sajjad - Indian Islamic scholar
- Abdullah Khan - Indian author and scriptwriter
- Abdul Ghafoor - Indian freedom fighter, politician and 13th Chief Minister of Bihar
- Abdul Ghafoor Shahbaz - Indian Poet, Translator and Researcher of Urdu-language.
- Abdul Bari - Indian freedom activist, academic and social reformer
- Abdul Bari Siddiqui - politician and the former finance minister of Bihar.
- Abdul Qavi Desnavi - Indian Urdu language writer, critic, bibliographer and linguist
- Abdul Qaiyum Ansari - Indian freedom fighter, activist and politician
- Abul Mahasin Muhammad Sajjad - Indian Islamic scholar
- Ahmad Ashfaque Karim - businessman, edupreneur and politician
- Ahsanuddin Amanullah - judge of the Supreme Court of India
- Ahmad Nesar - Indian poet and author
- Ahmad Wali Faisal Rahmani - Indian Muslim community leader
- Anees Fatima - Indian freedom fighter, politician, philanthropist and teacher
- Abul Kalam Qasmi Shamsi - Indian Islamic scholar, author and essayist
- Abdul-Qādir Bedil - Indian Sufi, and one of the greatest Indo-Persian poets
- Akhtarul Iman - Indian politician
- Ali Ibrahim Khan - 18th-century Indian statesman and poet
- Ali Anwar - Indian journalist, social activist and politician
- Amir Subhani - former Chief Secretary of Bihar
- Aslam Azad - Indian politician and a Poet
- Asif Ahmad - Indian Politician
- Ata Hussain Fani Chishti - Indian Sufi saint of the Chisti Order.
- Ata Kakwi – Indian poet and writer.
- Asrarul Haq Qasmi - Indian Muslim scholar and politician
- Avidur Rahman - Indian Politician
- Aziza Fatima Imam - Indian politician and social activist and Member of Rajya Sabha in 1973 and 1979
- Batak Mian - cook who saved the life of Mahatma Gandhi from a murder attempt by food poisoning
- Bismillah Khan - Indian musician, shehnai player and Bharat Ratna
- Bismil Azimabadi - Indian freedom fighter, Urdu poet and the writer of the famous patriotic poem "Sarfaroshi Ki Tamanna"
- Ejaz Ali - Indian social worker, doctor, journalist and politician
- Eqbal Ahmad - Pakistani political scientist, writer and academic
- Faraz Fatmi - Indian Politician
- Faisal Rahman - Indian Politician
- Faiyaz Ahmad - Indian Politician
- Fuzail Ahmad Nasiri - Indian Deobandi Islamic scholar, Urdu writer and poet
- Ghulam Sarwr - Indian Politician
- Hussain Ul Haque - Indian writer, Urdu critic and theorist
- Hussain Zawar - Indian politician and a member of Rajya Sabha
- Imdad Imam Asar - Indian poet, critic, writer and academic
- Imtiaz Ali - Indian film director who works primarily in Bollywood, known for movies such as Tamasha and Rockstar
- Jabir Husain - Indian writer, historian and politician
- Jafar Imam - Indian Politician
- Javeed Ahmad - Retired Indian Police Service (IPS) officer
- Kamal Ahmed Rizvi - Pakistani television actor and playwright.
- Kaiser Rehan - Indian Taekwondo practitioner, coach, and referee
- Kalim Aajiz - Indian writer of Urdu literature and a poet
- Kazi Ahmad Hussain - Indian politician, two-time Member of Rajya Sabha
- Khalid Ahmed - Pakistani TV director, producer and actor.
- Khalid Saifullah Rahmani - Indian Islamic scholar, author and jurist
- Kumkum - Indian film actress
- Khuda Bakhsh - Chief Justice of Hyderabad State and founder of the Khuda Bakhsh Oriental Library
- Lilliput - Indian actor and comedian
- Maghfoor Ahmad Ajazi - Indian political activist and freedom fighter
- Mahbub Alam - Indian Politician
- Manazir Ahsan Gilani - Indian Sunni Islamic scholar and former Dean of the Faculty of Theology at Osmania University
- Mazhar Asif - Indian academic administrator, and Vice-Chancellor of Jamia Millia Islamia
- Mazhar Imam - Indian Urdu poet and critic
- Meeran Haider - Indian activist leader and human rights defender
- Md Zabir Ansari - Indian karate player
- Minnatullah Rahmani - Indian Sunni Muslim scholar, first General Secretary of All India Muslim Personal Law Board
- M J Warsi - Indian linguist, researcher, and author
- Mohd Zama Khan - Indian politician and Minister of Minority Welfare Government of Bihar
- Mohammad Hidayatullah Khan - Indian politician and former Speaker of the Bihar Legislative Assembly
- Mohammad Jawed - Indian politician, doctor
- Mohammed Taslimuddin - former Home Minister of India, MLA and MP
- Mohammad Murshid Alam - Indian Politician
- Mohammad Shahabuddin - former 2-time MLA and 4-time MP of Siwan Sadar
- Mohammad Yunus - first premier of British India's Bihar Province
- Mohammad Zahid Ashraf - Indian scientist and an academician
- Maulana Mazharul Haq - Indian freedom Fighter, author and politician
- Moin-ul-Haq - Indian sports administrator, member of Indian Olympic Association
- Muhammad Izhar Asfi - Indian Politician
- Mujahid Alam - Indian politician
- Mujahidul Islam Qasmi - Indian mufti, qadhi and Islamic scholar, founder of Islamic Fiqh Academy
- Muhammad Azam Nadwi - Indian Islamic scholar, writer, and professor
- Muhibullah Bihari - Hanafi jurist, logician, and scholar active in late Mughal India
- Muhammad Shafi Daudi - Indian Muslim scholar and a politician
- Mukhtaruddin Ahmad - Indian literary critic and Writer of Urdu language
- Munim Pak - Indian Sufi saint of Qadiriyya Order of Sufism
- Naushad Alam - Indian Politician and former Ministry of Minority Welfare Department in Bihar
- Neelima Azeem - Indian actress, classical dancer, writer
- Parveen Amanullah - Indian social activist, politician and former Minister of Social Welfare in the Government of Bihar
- Qamrul Hoda - Indian Politician
- Qeyamuddin Ahmad - Indian Historian and academic
- Rashid-un-Nisa - first Indian women Urdu Novelist and social reformer
- Quaiser Khalid - officer of the Indian Police Service
- Rafiuddin Raz - Pakistani poet
- Rafique Alam - Indian politician and union minister
- Reyazul Haque Raju - Indian Politician
- Raza Naqvi Wahi - Indian Urdu poet
- Saba Karim - former Indian cricketer
- Saba Zafar - Indian Politician
- Sabir Ali - Indian Politician
- Sakibul Gani - Indian cricketer
- Sarfaraz Alam - Indian Politician
- Sarwar Alam- Indian Politician
- Shad Azimabadi - Indian poet and writer
- Shah Mohamad Umair - Indian politician
- Shahid Ali Khan - Indian Politician
- Shahjehan Syed Karim - Pakistani civil servant who served as the chief secretary of Sindh
- Shahzad Khalil - Pakistani television director and producer.
- Shafiqullah Ansari - Indian Politician
- Sharjeel Imam - Indian student activist
- Shama Parveen - Indian kabaddi player
- Shamim Hashmi - Rajya Sabha MP and social activist
- Shakeel Ahmad - Indian Politician and former minister
- Sheikh Zainuddin - 18th-century Indian painter
- S. H. Bihari - Indian lyricist, songwriter and poet
- Sharfuddin Yahya Maneri - 13th-century Indian Sufi mystic
- Shahid Ali Khan - Indian politician
- Surur Hoda - Indian socialist politician and trade unionist
- Sulaiman Nadvi - Islamic scholar, historian and a writer
- Sohail Azimabadi - Indian Urdu poet, novelist, fiction writer, journalist and critic
- Syed Ahmad Hashmi - Indian Muslim scholar and politician
- Syed Ata Ullah Shah Bukhari - Hanafi Islamic scholar and a Religio-political figure
- Syed Ali Imam - Prime Minister of Hyderabad State and Indian independence activist
- Seyed E. Hasnain - Indian academic and a microbiologist
- Syed Hussain Bilgrami - Indian civil servant, politician, educationalist
- Syed Hasan - Indian writer, scholar and professor of Persian language and literature in Patna University
- Syed Hasan Askari - Indian writer and historian
- Syed Hasan Imam - Indian barrister and politician
- Syed Hussain Imam – politician from Gaya, senior leader of the All-India Muslim League.
- Syed Shahabuddin - Indian politician and diplomat
- Syed Shahnawaz Hussain - Indian politician, former minister, and a member of Bharatiya Janata Party
- Syed Sultan Ahmed - Indian barrister and politician
- Tabish Khair - Indian English author and associate professor in the Department of English, University of Aarhus
- Talib Jauhari - Pakistani Islamic scholar, poet, historian and philosopher
- Tariq Anwar - Indian politician and MP representing Katihar (Lok Sabha constituency)
- Tauseef Alam - Indian Politician
- Taqi Rahim - Indian freedom fighter, writer and historian
- Wahab Ashrafi - Indian literary critic and poet
- Wali Rahmani - Indian Sunni Islamic scholar and academic and the founder of Rahmani30
- Yagana Changezi - Indian Urdu-language poet
- Zahida Hina - Pakistani Urdu columnist, essayist, short story writer, novelist and dramatist
- Zeishan Quadri - Indian writer, actor, director and producer
- Zafar Iqbal - former Indian field hockey player and captain of the India national team
- Zafeeruddin Miftahi - Indian Muslim scholar and jurist

== See also ==
- Islam in India
- Bengali Muslims
- Gujarati Muslims
- Hyderabadi Muslims
- Malabar Muslims
- Tamil Muslim
- Meitei Pangals
- Punjabi Muslims
- Islam in Kerala
