= Bihari literature =

Overview

Bihar has produced a number of poets and writers in its languages like Bhojpuri Maithili language, Magahi language, Angika and Bajjika including Bhikhari Thakur, Heera Dom, Viveki Rai, Satishwar Sahay Verma, Pandey Kapil etc. are writers of Bhojpuri, Vidyapati in Maithili. Besides its regional languages, Bihar has also produced writers in English such as Anilchandra Thakur Raj Kamal Jha, Amitava Kumar, Tabish Khair, Abdullah Khan, Abhay K, Siddhartha Chowdhury; and Hindi including Raja Radhika Raman Prasad Sinha, Acharya Ramlochan Saran, Acharya Shivpujan Sahay, Divakar Prasad Vidyarthy, Ramdhari Singh 'Dinkar', Ram Briksh Benipuri, Phanishwar Nath 'Renu', Gopal Singh "Nepali", Ramesh Chandra Jha and Baba Nagarjun. Writer and Buddhist scholar Mahapandit Rahul Sankrityayan was born in Uttar Pradesh but spent his life in the land of Buddha, i.e., Bihar.

== Languages ==
=== Bhojpuri ===
Bhikhari Thakur was a Bhojpuri writer who has written several plays, poems and essays on social issues like women empowerment, poverty, migration, caste system etc. Bidesiya and Gabarghichor are one of the most famous plays written by him. Heera Dom, a Bhojpuri poet is credited for creating first poem on dalits. Rameshwar Singh Kashyap wrote the famous play Loha Singh. Raghuveer Narayan wrote the famous poem Batohiya.

=== Maithiili ===
- Vidyapati Thakur is the most renowned poet of Maithili. (c. 14–15th century).
- Usha Kiran Khan is a renowned Maithili writer.
- AnilChandra Thakur is popular for his Maithili Novel Aab Maan Jau.

=== Hindi ===
- Ramdhari Singh 'Dinkar'
- Ram Briksh Benipuri
- Phanishwar Nath 'Renu'
- Gopal Singh "Nepali"
- Ramesh Chandra Jha
- Baba Nagarjun
- Raja Radhika Raman Prasad Sinha
- Acharya Ramlochan Saran
- Acharya Shivpujan Sahay
- Hrishikesh Sulabh is a short story writer, playwright and theatre critic.
- Anamika (poet)
- Neelakshi Singh
- Nagarjun

=== Urdu ===
Different regional languages also have produced some prominent poets and authors. Sheen Muzaffarpuri is a famous Urdu writer and journalist Of Bihar. Raza Naqvi Wahi was the preeminent Indian Urdu language poet during his time, was born in Khujwan, Siwan, Bihar, and wrote many Urdu Poetry and also awarded as Ghalib Award.

- Syed Hasan Askari
- Ahmad Nesar
- Kalim Ajiz
- Aslam Azad
- Bismil Azimabadi
- Shad Azimabadi
- Sohail Azimabadi
- Shamim Hashimi
- Mazhar Imam
- Abdul-Qādir Bedil
- Abdul Qavi Desnavi
- Hussain Ul Haque
- Abul Kalam Qasmi
- Abul Kalam Qasmi Shamsi
- Imdad Imam Asar
- Mazhar Imam
- Abdul Ghafoor Shahbaz
- Wahab Ashrafi
- Mukhtaruddin Ahmad

=== English ===
- Abdullah Khan - author, screenwriter and banker from Motihari. His debut novel 'Patna Blues' has been translated into 10 languages. His second novel 'A Man from Motihari' was published in 2023 by penguin random House India.
- Abhay K- poet, editor, translator and Ambassador, born in Nalanda district of Bihar. He has penned a memoir and nine collections of poetry. He is the first Indian poet to be invited at the Library of Congress to record his poems.
- Amitava Kumar - author, journalist, and professor of English at Vassar College. He was born in Arrah district in Bihar. Author of Husband of a Fanatic, Bombay-London-New York, and Passport Photos
- Raj Kamal Jha- novelist and news editor. His five novels have been translated into several languages.
- Siddhartha Chowdhury " Patna Roughcut", Diksha at St. Martin's, Day Scholar, Patna Manual of Style, Ritwik & Hriday
- Tabish Khair - poet and novelist, born in Gaya district of Bihar
- R. K. Sinha - died in 2003. He was born in Munger district of Bihar. He was a gold medalist for his master of arts degree. He was awarded a D Phil from Oxford University in 1950
- Satyapal Chandra has broken traditional stereotype in English literature by writing a number of English bestsellers of various genres

== Women Writers ==
- Rasheed-Un-Nisa - First Women Novelist of Bihar who does not have named as an Author in the book. She was the writer of book, Islaah-Un-Nisa in Urdu language.
- Anamika (poet)- Poet, author of several poetry collections
- Nikita Singh

== Writers Born in Bihar ==
Sharat Chandra Chattopadhyay, writer in Bengali, resided for some time in Bihar. Indian writer in English Upamanyu Chatterjee also hails from Patna in Bihar. Devaki Nandan Khatri, who at the beginning of the 20th century wrote novels including Chandrakanta and Chandrakanta Santati, was born in Muzaffarpur, Bihar. Writer and Buddhist scholar Mahapandit Rahul Sankrityayan was born in Uttar Pradesh but spent his life in the land of Buddha, i.e., Bihar. well known writer George Orwell was also born in Bihar.
