= Rafiuddin Raz =

Pakistani poet

Rafiuddin 'Raz'
- Born: Mirza Rafiuddin Baig; 21 April 1938; Bihar, India
- Education: MA, General History.
- Occupation: Urdu poet
- Writing career
- Pen name: Raz
- Period: 1988 – Present
- Genres: Ghazal; Free verse

Mirza Rafiuddin 'Raz' Baig (Urdu: مرزا رفیوددیں بیگ; born 21 April 1938) is a Pakistani poet. He published his first volume of poetry Deeda-e-Khush Khwab in 1988 and followed it with Beenai (Sight), Pairahan-e-Fikr (The Dress of Thought), Roshni Kay Khad-o-Khaal (Features of Light) and Abhi Darya Main Pani Hai (There is Water in the River, Yet),

His recent book, bar bisat e Ghalib (200 ghazals in 200 Ghalib's Misray), was published in November 2021.

== Poetry ==
=== Style and themes ===
Raz is primarily a ghazal writer.

=== Repeated usage of Aa'ina ===
Raz is noted for repeatedly playing with the Urdu word aa'ina [mirror in English] in his poetry, and integrating it into his work in different ways. Poet and reviewer Afsar Mahpuri notes in his article, "Rafiuddin Raaz – A dreaming poet," the "focal position and importance" that the mirror has been awarded over time, and presents the following partial list of couplets, containing the word aa'ina, by Raz.

=== Critical reception ===
Shafeeq Ali Khan calls him "a modern poet in every respect," and stating that "his feelings, emotions, observations and experiences are not traditional – they are, rather, a reflection of his own self and personality." Mehshar Badaiwani has called his work "a living example" of meaningful poetry, showing Raz's "poetical greatness."

Shan ul Haq Haqqi has written that, "Rafiuddin Raz's poetry contains both beauty off thought and beauty of style... [and is] successful throughout the body of Urdu poetry," while Aslam Farrukhi claims that "Poetry, itself, has picked Raz for its expression." Similarly, Athar Hashmi speaks of finding "the features of life" in Raaz's work, and Shabnam Romani of his "uniqueness", and his "eloquent [use of] language and civilized tones," saying that, "the raz (secret) is that Raz's poetry is new!"

Raz's ghazal has received widespread applause: Professor Najmi Siddiqui calls it "a fragrant puff of air that, having touched the fertile shores of classical tradition, gives life and lesson to the reader" and Mushaffiq Khwaja finds it "a custodian of the highest traditions of Urdu ghazal" which has "not only adhered to tradition, but taken it forward." Similarly, Hafeez Taib has praised him for opening "new horizons" for the ghazal, and saying that "his verses seem to beat with one's own pulse."

=== Comparison to classical poets ===
Raz is often compared to different Urdu poetry greats, including Ghalib, Meer and Yagana. In his article, Afkaar ki Taazgi [The Freshness of Thoughts], modern-day poet Afsar Mahpuri draws a parallel between Raz and classical, ghazal poet, Yagana, saying that "some of Raz's verses are close to Yagana's voice" because he "has not begun his poetry with romantic exaggerations, in which countless poets waste their lives."

Dr. Rasheed Nisaar, on the other hand, compares Raz to Persian-language poet Bedil and one of Urdu poetry's greatest philosophers, Ghalib, saying that Raz "possesses the same style of thought and beauty of narration as Bedil and Ghalib."

== Honours ==
A book entitled Rafiuddin Raz: Shaksiyat aur Fan [Rafiuddin Raz: Personality and Art] was written by Naima Parveen, under the supervision of Sohaila Farooqi, and published as part of a study for a Master of Arts degree in Urdu in the Urdu Department of Karachi University.

In early 2010, the poet Zia Khan 'Zia' published a selection of Raz's poetry, titled Jamal-e-Hurf-e-Raz [The Beauty of Raz's Word]. It contained 125 of Raz's ghazalyat, as well as a lengthy essay on the finer points of Raz's poetry.

In January 2013, critic Gohar Malsiani published a 624-page critical analysis of Raz poetry, titled "Sukhan Ka Chiragh" (The light of Poetry). It discusses in detail the finer points of Raz poetry.

Raz has been the subject of various poetic tributes, including "Abhi Darya Main Pani Hai" aur Rafiuddin Raz ["There is Water in the River, Yet" and Rafiuddin Raz] by Sohail Ghazipuri, Pairahan-e-Akfaar [The Dress of Thoughts] by Dr. Abdul Manaan Tarzi, Kharaj-e-Tehseen (The Gift of Praise) by Khwaja Manzar Hassan Manzar, Azeez Dost, Rafiuddin Raz ki Nazar [For a Special Friend, Rafiuddin Raz] by Maqbool Naksh, Baleegh Andaaz [Sophisticated Style] and Roshni Kay Khad-o-Khaal Ka Shaa'ir [The Poet of "Features of Light] by Sadeeq Fatahpuri, and Rafiuddin Raz Kay Liye [For Rafiuddin Raz] by Junaid Azar.

== Personal life ==
=== Childhood ===
Raz was born in Begusarai, India. His father Fariduddin Baig's family belonged to Darbhanga, and his mother Hajra's to Begusarai, both districts of the state Bihar.

He attended BPHE School, Begusarai before switching to the Muslim High School Lehrya Sarai but, after his parents separated in 1945, was sent to live with his father's elder brother, Hameeduddin Baig. Unfortunately for him, Hameeduddin was not interested in educating him, and Raz had to work as a conductor and, subsequently, driver, in Hameeduddin's transport company. He continued, however, to persist in juggling his studies alongside the job, and finally passed his Inter-Commerce Exams from Quiad-e-Azam College, Dhaka.

=== 1951 onwards ===
In 1951, when riots were taking place in the aftermath of the Partition of India, Raz migrated to Dhaka, then a part of East Pakistan, and declared himself a Pakistani.

After the proclamation of Bangladesh, Raz was a prisoner of war from 1971 to 1973. He migrated to Karachi as soon as he was released, but found himself facing much poverty. He switched between several jobs in an attempt to earn, from tutoring kids to working as a government employee. He eventually started a business with his commanding officer, Colonel Aakil Abbas Rizvi, and established himself as a self-made and financially stable man.

He married Noshaba Khatoon in 1964, and has six children – two daughters named Naheed Anjum and Ambreen, and four sons named Tariq, Rehan, Saqib, and Waqiuddin – with her. Currently, Raz holds a master's degree in General History, and has said that, more than anything else, it was an act meant to provide "moral support" to his children.

== Books ==
Title	Translated title	Year published
Deeda-e-Khush Khwab		1988
Beenai	Sight	1997
Pairahan-e-Fikr	The Dress of Thought	2002
Roshni Kay Khad-o-Khaal	Features of Light	2005
Abhi Darya Main Pani Hai	There is Water in the River	2006
Itni Tamazat Kis Liye	For What, this Blazing Heat?	2007
Jo ik din aaeena dekha	azmain	2008
Suqrat say shaikh chilli tuk	Inshayee	2010
Aabshare sukhan	Rubiyat ka mujmoa	2010
Itni Tamazat Kis Liye	For What, this Blazing Heat?	2007
Jo ik din aaeena dekha	azmain	2008
Suqrat say shaikh chilli tuk	Inshayee	2010
Saaz o raaz	Rubiyat ka mujmoa	2010
Dil Aaina Hua	Spiritual Poetry	2011
Doha Phulwari	Collect	2011
Ik Kon o Makan aur		2012
Baat say baat	Inshaiye	2015
Qataat album		2015
Sukhan Sarmaya	Kulyat	2015
Dar e Aaina	Ghazaliat	2016
Dil Ka Nakhlistan	Hyko collection	2017
Tajdeed e Muhabbat		2012
sukhandan e Raaz	poetry collection	2021
Insha e Raaz	Inshayeh	2020
Wadi e Ghazal	87 ghazals in 87 metre	2019
Bar Bisat e Ghalib	200 ghazals in 200 Ghalib's Misray	2021
Abhi Kapray Badan Per Hain	Collection of Ghazals	2022
Gulzar-e-Sukhan	Selected Ghazals	2024
Kulyat-e-Hamd o Naat	All religious poetry in one	2024

- (Source:)
