= Thakurai =

Muslim Rajput community found in Bihar, India

Regions with significant populations
- India; Nepal

Languages
- Urdu; Hindi; Bhojpuri

Religion
- Islam

Related ethnic groups
- Khanzada; Muslim Rajput; Malik; Bihari Rajputs

The Thakurai are a Muslim Rajput community found in the state of Bihar in India. They are mostly concentrated around East and West Champaran District and the surrounding region. A small number are also found in the Terai region of Nepal.

== Origin ==
The Thakurai are said to have originated in Rajasthan, and converted to Islam during the rule of the Mughal emperor Aurangzeb. They were soldiers in the Mughal army that was sent to pacify Bihar. Their ancestor was Mahabat Khan, a Sisodia Rajput of Mewar, who converted to Islam. They are now found in fifty-three villages in Muzaffarpur, Vaishali, East and West Champaran District, and also have a presence in neighbouring Terai region of Nepal. The word Thakurai literally means lord, and originates from the Hindi term Thakur. Informed members of the community claim they use Thakurai to differentiate themselves from local Hindu Rajputs.

== Present circumstances ==
Unlike, other Muslim communities, they maintain good relations with Hindu Rajputs who live in the same villages, likely due to a common heritage.
