= Siddhartha Chowdhury =

Indian writer

Siddharth Chowdhury
- Born: 1974 (age 51–52); Patna, Bihar
- Citizenship: Indian
- Education: Hindu College; University of Delhi
- Occupations: Author and writer

Siddharth Chowdhury is an Indian novelist. He lives in Delhi where, until recently, he worked with a publishing company. He began writing at 19, "Rather late", he says, "most writers seem to start at 10 or earlier" but was soon publishing short stories in Indian and foreign publications.

== Writing career ==
Chowdhury grew up in Patna and studied English Literature at Delhi University from 1993 to 1998. His first collection of stories, Diksha at St. Martins, was published in 2002 to immense praise. In 2007, he was granted the Charles Wallace Writer-in-Residence Fellowship at the University of Stirling in Scotland. He is the author of Patna Roughcut and Day Scholar, the latter of which was partially written at the university and shortlisted for the Man Asian Literary Prize in 2009. He currently lives in Delhi and holds the position of Editorial Consultant at Manohar Books.

== Notable works ==
- Diksha at St. Martin's (2002), Sristhi Publication
- Patna Roughcut (2005), Picador India
- Day Scholar (2010), Picador Indial
- A Patna Manual of Style (2015) Aleph Books

== Award ==
- The Man Asian Literary Prize in 2009
