= Ali Ibrahim Khan =

Indian statesman and literary figure

Ali Ibrahim Khan, also known as Khalil Azimabadi (1714–1793), was an 18th-century Indian statesman and literary figure from Patna, then known as Azimabad.

He was part of a group of Shia elites in the court of Alivardi Khan and he later worked for the British East India Company. He is well known for the literary work of his later career which includes the Persian biographies of Indian writers of his generation. He used his connections to install many of his own family in respectable positions and initiated the careers of many landholders in Bihar and Varanasi. He is credited with building the Dooly Ghat mosque in Patna.

== Early life ==
Ali Ibrahim Khan was born in Patna in a highly respected Shia Muslim family. His uncle was a jurist and a judge and his grandfather was a scholar. According to Joseph Héliodore Garcin de Tassy, his father's name was Abdul Hakim.

When he was just ten years old, he was taken from Patna to Murshidabad in 1740 together with other skilled administrators by Nawab Alivardi Khan, the Persian deputy-governor of Bihar who usurped the Nawabi of Bengal.

== Time in court ==
While posted at the court of Alivardi Khan, he impressed the nobles with his literary skills.

In the years 1760–63, Ali Ibrahim was the most trusted advisor to Mir Qasim, who tried to reverse the East India Company's conquest of Bengal. The British and their Indian collaborators respected Ali Ibrahim's abilities and they soon employed him in the civil administration; in 1781 he accepted the post of Chief Magistrate of Civil Courts at Varanasi and the temporary role of amīn, executive assistant to the British Resident, in the overall government of Benares district. The Governor-General wrote that:

“such is the opinion entertained of the Wisdom, and Integrity of Ally Ibrahim Cawn that the Naib will respect his opinions, and will at least fear to commit any gross Neglect or Misdemeanor with such an eye constantly regarding him”

== Literary career ==
Ibrahim Ali Khan began writing while posted in Murshidabad where he also was a patron of various poets, all his surviving works were completed in Varanasi. His most famous work was the Golzār-e Ebrāhīm, a tadhkirah of Urdu poets, begun in 1770 and completed in 1784.
