= Shershabadia =

Bengali Muslim community

শেরশাবাদিয়া

Regions with significant populations
- West Bengal (Malda, Murshidabad, Uttar Dinajpur); Bihar (Katihar, Purnia, Araria); Jharkhand (Sahebganj, Pakur); Bangladesh (Chapai Nawabganj)
- Bihar: 1,302,644 (2023)

Languages
- Bengali (Varendri dialect) (L1); Hindi-Urdu (L2)

Religion
- Sunni Islam (Ahl-i Hadith)

Shershabadia, also known as Badia, are a Bengali Muslim community found in the states of West Bengal, Bihar and Jharkhand in India. They belong to Bengali Shaikh community and also form a significant part of the Shaikhs of West Bengal and Bihar. Common surnames used by the community include Shekh, Sekh, Haque, Islam, and Mondal. Most of them are Sunni Muslims who associate with the Ahl-i Hadith movement.

These people mostly live in chars and dubas (lower land) along Gangetic river lines from Katihar district of Bihar on the north bank and Sahibganj District of Jharkhand on the south bank to Murshidabad district of West Bengal on the South bank and Malda district of West Bengal on the north bank.

== Terminology ==
The word Shershabadia (from Persian: شرشابادیا) literally means the inhabitants of the land known as Sarsabad/Shershabad, a pargana of historical Bengal Subah. The term is derived from the community's place of origin known as Jawar-e-Sarsabad or Circle/Division of Sarsabad in Mughal Bengal province, which was reduced to a mere Pargana known as Sarsabad/Sersabad later on corrupted into Shershabad/Shershahabad. Located in the Bengal region, Shershabad comprised the parts of southern Malda and northern Murshidabad.

== History and origin ==
The Shershabadia Bengali Muslim community originated from the erstwhile Jawar-e-Sarsabad or division of Sarsabad in Mughal Bengal province which comprised Northern parts of Murshidabad, most parts of Malda of West bengal and the north-eastern parts of Sahebganj district of Jharkhand.

Towards the beginning of the 20th century, a large number of Shershabadias of Murshidabad (chiefly from Farakka, Samserganj and Suti police stations) gradually migrated to Malda along the upward river-stream of the Ganges to settle in the chars and diyaras due to the erosion of the west bank of the Ganges.

From Malda and Murshidabad they migrated upwards along the river-stream and scattered into the various regions of Eastern Bihar and Northern Bengal. The cause of migration is thought to be due to the oppression of British Government for their engagement in the anti-British activities and the erosion of the Ganges along the left and right banks.

They participated in the anti-British activities under the banner of Wahabi movement in the mid nineteenth century. They established several anti-British outposts across the district of Malda and adjoining regions. Freedom fighters, funds, ammunitions etc. were collected from wide areas by boat through river ways and were gathered at first in Narayanpur centre and then forwarded to Patna centre by board and ultimately supplied systematically to Sittana, the battlefield of the North-West Frontiers. They developed systematic collections of Zakat, Osor, Fitra, and other voluntary subscriptions from these areas. They also invented a new system of collecting fund, i.e. "Mutthi". This system was invented by the Patna Kalif for the cause of developing fund to launch anti-British Movement.

They were engaged in anti-British activities under leaders such as Maulana Rafi Mondal, Moulavi Amiruddin and Ibrahim Mondal. The leaders of the movement were prosecuted in 1869 for waging war against the British Government. Moulavi Amiruddin and Ibrahim Mondal were sentenced to the exile in the Andaman Islands in the conspiracy of Malda, 1870 and conspiracy of Rajmahal, 1870 respectively.

During the British period, the Shershabadia people were considered by the British authorities, to have criminal tendency for the involvement of some members in the anti-British movement known as Wahabi Movement, but later on the British authority changed their attitude to this community.

== Geographic Distribution ==
The Shershabadias traditionally resides along the left and right banks of the Ganges from Rajmahal subdivision of Jharkhand up to the Chapai Nawabganj district of Bangladesh's Rajshahi Division. At present, they live mainly in the surrounding districts of West Bengal and Bihar namely Malda, Murshidabad, Uttar Dinajpur, Purnia, Katihar, Kishanganj etc. Presently, after the divide of Bihar into Jharkhand, the north-eastern parts of Sahebganj and Pakur district are where they are found. They also live in Darjeeling and Uttar Dinajpur districts of West Bengal and Rajshahi, Naogaon and Thakurgaon districts of Bangladesh where they migrated from Malda and Murshidabad.

== Present circumstances ==
The Shershabadia people reportedly speak Maldaiya Bengali (or natively Shershabadia Bengali), a subdialect of the North Central Bengali dialect of Bengali. Linguist Prabhat Ranjan Sarkar placed the dialect on the fifth position among regional Bengali dialects and states that the dialect has a very beautiful pronunciation and a unique intonation or manner of speaking. The aspirates are pronounced clearly throughout this dialect like Standard Bengali. Those who reside in Bihar and Jharkhand have knowledge of Hindi and Urdu.

They are a community of settled agriculturist, but as their population has grown, the land ownership has been sub-divided. This has led to many becoming landless, and a growth of those in the community who are agricultural labour, day labour, teaching, business etc. This drift is aggravated also due to the river bank erosion along the Ganges which flows through the parts of the southern Malda and Northern Murshidabad.

The community entirely belongs to Sunni Muslim. The majority do not belong to any of the four recognized theological schools of Islam viz. Hanafi, Shafi'i, Maliki and Hanbali. Rather they follow all the correct call from all the four Imams and they are known as Ahl-i Hadith (strict followers of the Quran and Hadith). Preaching of any Pir/ Darbesh (Muslim Saint) is not accepted of them normally. Except the prayer in funeral ground they do not perform Jiyarat (a type of prayer kindling light). As a whole they are not involved in popular Muharram but some of them are remain on fasting throughout the day. Charham and Chalisha (observance on fourth and fortieth day after death) are not performed in most of the Shershabadia Community.

== Social Traditions ==
They live in the organised settlements of their own in a para or village. Few households from the same area forms a Jamat or Dōsh. This Jamat is responsible for managing ceremonies related to birth, marriage and death. It also settles the familial and land disputes locally. The role of Sōrdar of the Jamat (Chief of the Community) is very important in this society.

Their females follow the system of Parda (Veil) as far as practiced. Shershabadia women are experts in stitching Kantha/Kheta (clothes) and singing Shershabadia Geed (songs).

Marriage is solemnised mostly at daytime. During marriages they perform the rituals like Haldi Makha, Bayna Kora, Geed Gaha, Thubra Khawa etc.

Their traditional food items include Kalaiyer ruti, Ayaikhar Khir, Bhakka (Bhapa) pitha, Patisapta pitha, Pantabhat/Jolbhat, Andhasa/Adarsa, Chityai/Chitua Pitha etc.

== See also ==
- Bengali Muslim
- Khotta Muslim
