= Mukhtaruddin Ahmad =

Indian literary critic and Writer (1924–2010)

Mukhtaruddin Ahmad Arzoo
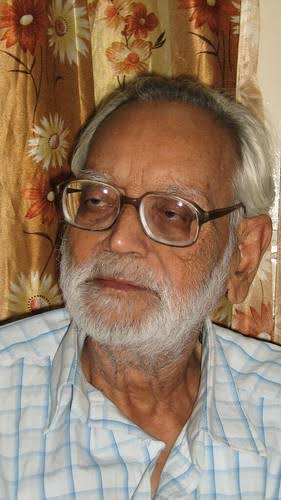
- Born: 14 November 1924; Zafar Manzil, Azimabad, Patna district, Bihar
- Died: 30 June 2010 (aged 85); Aligarh, Uttar Pradesh

Signature
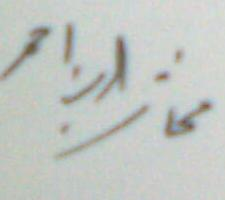

Mukhtaruddin Ahmad Arzoo (14 November 1924 – 30 June 2010) was an Indian literary critic and Writer of Urdu language. He was former Dean of Faculty of Arts at Aligarh Muslim University. He was appointed as the lecturer in the Department of Arabic at Aligarh Muslim University in 1953. He was the founding Vice Chancellor of Maulana Mazharul Haque Arabic and Persian University. He was appointed as the Senior Fellow at Royal Aal al-Bayt Institute for Islamic Thought, Jordan in 2004.

== Early life and education ==
Ahmad was born into a religious family of Maulana Zafaruddin Bihari Qadri Razvi, a disciple of Imam Ahmed Raza Khan Barelvi on 14 November 1924 at Azimabad in Bihar. They are a claimed descendant of Malik Ibrahim Baya of Bihar Sharif.

He completed his education till Maulvi and Alimiyat under his father at Madrasa Shamsul Huda, Patna.

== Literary works ==
- Arzu, Mukhtar Uddin Ahmad (1949). The Aligarh Urdu magazine: Ghalib number (in Urdu). Muslim University Press.
- Ahmad, Mukhtaruddin. Halat-e-Zindagi-e-Abdul Haq (in Urdu). Delhi: Sahitya Academy.
- Ahmad, Mukhtaruddin (1992). Abdul Haq: Maker of Indian Literature. New Delhi: Sahitya Akademi. ISBN 978-81-7201-023-2.
- Ahmad, Mukhtaruddin (1956). Naqd-e-Ghalib (in Urdu). Delhi: Anjuman-e-Taraqqi-e-Urdū.
- Ahmad, Mukhtaruddin (1956). An Introduction to and Analysis of the Leiden MS of Jamharat Al-Islām by Muslim B. Maḥmūd Al S̲h̲ayzarī, and a Critical Edition of Hitherto Unpublished Passages from Writers and Poets Down to the Fourth Century A.H., with Annotations. University of Oxford Press.
- Ahmad, Mukhtaruddin (1960). Maḥmūd ibn ʻAlī al-Ustādār aẓ-Ẓāhirī (in Urdu). Aligarh: Muslim Yūnīvarsiṭī Press.
- Ahmad, Mukhtaruddin. Meer Ali al-Katib Ka Ek Shahkar (in Urdu).
- Ahmad, Mukhtaruddin; Ram, Malik (1965). Nazr-e-Arshi (in Urdu). New Delhi: Majlis Nazr-e-Arshi.
- Rizvi, Sayyad Azeez Husain (2009). Ahmad, Mukhtaruddin (ed.). Hayat-e-Zafar (in Urdu). Mumbai: Anjuman Barkat Raza.
- Ahmad, Mukhtaruddin (1960). Mohammad bin Ali al-Ustadar al-Zahiri (in Urdu). Aligarh: Idara-e-Uloom-e-Islamia.

== Awards and honours ==
- Certificate of Honour from President of India
- Ghalib Award (1983)
- Sir Syed Lifetime Achievement Award
