= Syed Mohammad Fakhruddin =

Indian politician (1868–1933)

Sir Syed Muhammad Fakhruddin Khan Bahadur

Member of the Bihar and Orissa Legislative Council
- In office 1921–1933

Education Minister of Bihar and Orissa
- In office 1921–1933

Personal details
- Born: Syed Mohammad Fakhruddin; 1868 Dumri, Patna, Bihar
- Died: 1933 Patna
- Resting place: Bagh-e-Mujibiya, Phulwari Sharif, Patna
- Education: Patna College (BA)

Sir Syed Muhammad Fakhruddin Khan Bahadur (1868–1933) was the first Muslim Education Minister of Bihar and Orissa from 1921 to 1933. He was the member of the Bihar Provincial Association. He was elected to Bihar and Orissa Legislative Council in 1921 was there till his death in 1933. He is known one of the Creator of Patna University.

== Early life and education ==
Syed Muhammad Fakhruddin was born to Syed Mohammad Ali in Village Dumri Near Patna. Fakhruddin was student of Mohammad Yahya, the husband of Rasheedun Nisa (sister of Syed Imdad Imam Asr). Rasheedun Nisa was the first Urdu Novel writer. Sir Fakhruddin was maternal relatives of Syed Waheeduddin Khan Bahadur (father of Syed Imdad Imam Asar and Rasheedun Nisa).

Fakhruddin completed his Bachelor of Arts from Patna College in 1891 and Bachelor of Law in 1893.
