= Sohail Azimabadi =

Indian writer (1911–1979)

- Born: Syed Mujibur Rahman; 16 July 1911; Islampur, Patna district, British Raj
- Died: 28 November 1979 (aged 68); Allahabad, Uttar Pradesh
- Resting place: Shah Ganj Qabristan, Patna
- Other name: Suhail Azimabadi
- Citizenship: British Raj (1911-1947); India (1947-1979)
- Education: Patna University
- Notable work: Sathi; Alao
- Political party: Indian National Congress
- Movement: Congress Socialist Party

Sohail Azimabadi (born as Syed Mujibur Rahman; 16 July 1911 – 28 November 1979) was an Indian Urdu poet, Novelist, Fictional writer, Journalist and critic. He was known as the international critic of Urdu-language along with Kaleem Aajiz.

He along with Akhtar Orenvi and Shakila Akhtar had contributed to the Short Story writings. He was a editor of Sathi, an Urdu daily newspaper published from Patna. He setup a branch of Progressive Writers' Movement at Patna in 1936.

== Early life ==
Azimabadi was born in 1911 to a respected middle class Sayyid family of Meer Habibur Rahman at Shahpur Bhadaul, Islampur, then a suburb in Patna district, Bihar but now in Warisaliganj block of Nawada district.

He was admitted to Dwarka High School, Muzaffarpur, affiliated under Patna University in Class 9 and given matriculation exam from the same school in 1930 but failed in the mathematics subject. He went to Kolkata to take admission in the Calcutta University but again failed in the mathematics and then he left his studies and started working with Hamdard.

== Career ==
He had worked with Hamdard, a Pro-Congress daily newspaper published from Kolkata, founded in 1932 and edited by Maulana Shafa'atullah Khan of Punjab. In 1936, Azimabadi wrote an article in support of Khan Abdul Ghaffar Khan and his son Abdul Wali Khan, who were in Multan Jail and against the British Government. As a consensus, the British Government asked for the Fine of 5000 which was not paid, and the Newspaper was banned in 1936 due to an article.

Azimabadi came back from Kolkata to Patna and joined Congress Socialist Party also participated in the Activisms organized by the Indian National Congress.

== Works ==
=== Books ===
- Azimabadi, Sohail (1972). Be jaṛ ke paude: ek nāvil [Plants without Roots: A Novel] (in Urdu). Naṣrat Pablisharz.
- Azimabadi, Sohail (1942). Alao (in Urdu). Lahore: Maktaba Urdu.
- Azimabadi, Sohail (1944). Naye Puraane [Old New] (in Urdu). Hyderabad: Ishat Manzil Urdu Gali.
- Azimabadi, Sohail (1977). Chaar Chehre [Four Faces] (in Urdu). Lucknow: Nusrat Publishers.
- Azimabadi, Sohail (1960). Rang Mahal [Colour Palace] (in Urdu). Zafar Adib.

=== Short stories ===
- Dil Ka Rog
- Do Mazdoor
- Andhere Aur Ujaale Mein
- Sharaabi
- Jawani
- Chaar Aane
- Bhook
- Chaukidaar
- Khoya Hua Lal
- Pet Ki Aag
