= Muslim scholarship =

Muslim scholarship may refer to:

- Historical scholarship by Muslims:
  - Islamic Golden Age
  - Science in the medieval Islamic world
- Islamic religious sciences
- Islamic scholars or ulama

== See also ==
- List of contemporary Islamic scholars
- List of Muslim historians
- List of Muslim philosophers
- List of Islamic jurists
- List of Muslim scientists
- List of Muslim astronomers
