= Acharya Ramlochan Saran =

Indian publisher

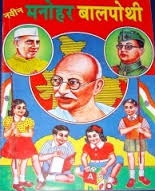
- Cover of Saran's work Manohar pothi
- Born: 11 February 1889; Sitamarhi, British India
- Died: 14 May 1971 (aged 82); Darbhanga Bihar, India
- Occupation: Writer
- Writing career
- Period: 19th–20th century

Acharya Ramlochan Saran (11 February 1889, Muzaffarpur–14 May 1971, Darbhanga) was a Hindi littérateur, grammarian and publisher. He founded Pustak Bhandar, a publishing enterprise, in Laheriasarai in 1915 and moved his publishing office to Patna in 1929. He also founded a number of magazines: Balak Magazine (1926–1986), Himalaya (1946–1948) and Honhar (Hindi and Urdu) (1939).

== Educational work ==
His Hindi primer Manohar Balapothi attempted to teach the Devanagari alphabet to beginners. He also published Some Eminent Behar Contemporaries by Sachchidananda Sinha, books by Mahatma Gandhi, and other Gandhian literature in both Hindi and English. He published Tolstoy and Gandhi by Dr. Kalidas Nag in English and produced a Maithili language version of the books of Tulsidas. Having edited and published Sidhant Bhasya, a four-volume commentary on Tulsidas's medieval retelling of the Ramayana, the Ramacharitamanasa, he was first to start printing Maithili books in Maithili script (Mithilakshar).

Through his publishing efforts he encouraged many other Hindi and Maithili littérateurs like Ramavriksha Benipuri, Ramdhari Singh 'Dinkar', Acharya Shivpujan Sahay, and Pt. Harimohan Jha. He guided Upendra Maharthi the artist to develop his talents through work under him for over a decade.

== Golden jubilee ==
The golden jubilee celebration was the occasion of Ramlochan's fifty years of successful publishing and literary and cultural contribution, a service to humankind. The celebration brought an appreciation from Mahatma Gandhi, the greatest Indian leader. He sent a message: "Brother Ram Lochan. I appreciate your work. Keep on with such service. Blessing of Bapu."

== Achievement ==
Laheriasarai became a hub of publishing driven by Ram Lochan Ji. His company was employing five hundred locals, trained by him in editing, production and marketing operations. He played an important role in making contemporary literature reach the masses, including “Balak’ magazine, the Almanac, books on Indian civilization, efforts of thinkers for renaissance in India, and the essential books for rural libraries. Ramlochan was regularly playing hosted saints, artists, poets, philosophers, social workers, educationalists, policy planners, and bureaucrats of the region. The Raja and the princes of Darbhanga Raj publicly honoured his contribution in the city and the development of the intelligentsia's creative artists, writer poets, and spirituals.

== Death ==
Ramlochan died in Darbhanga on 14 May 1971. On his death the President of India V. V. Giri mentioned that Acharyaji's service to children's literature will always be remembered as it will always inspire the coming generations. The noted English-language daily Indian Nation wrote in its editorial, "Had Ramlochan Saran not been born in Bihar the progress of Hindi Literature would have been delayed by a decade or two."
