= Taqi Rahim =

Indian soldier, writer and historian

- Died: 1998
- Occupations: Freedom fighter, Writer, Historian
- Organizations: Inquilabi Muslim Conference, Communist Party of India, Bihar State Janvadi Adhikar Suraksha Samiti
- Known for: Propagating Urdu at the national level, contribution to the Indian freedom movement
- Notable work: Tahreek-e-Aazadi Mein Bihar Ke Musalmano Ka Hissa, Zikr-e-Yunus, Jinnah Aur Gandhi, Bihar Ke Muslim Khwas, Islam Aur Hindustani Saqafat
- Title: President, Inquilabi Muslim Conference
- Political party: Communist Party of India

Taqi Rahim (died 1998) was an Indian freedom fighter, writer and historian who worked to propagate Urdu at the national level. He was a member of the Communist Party of India.

He had written and translated Tahreek-e-Aazadi Mein Bihar Ke Musalmano Ka Hissa, Zikr-e-Yunus, Jinnah Aur Gandhi, Bihar Ke Muslim Khwas, Islam Aur HIndustani Saqafat. He was president of Inquilabi Muslim Conference and also a member of the Central Control Commission elected by the Sixth Congress of Communist Party of India. He was a member of the Bihar State Janvadi Adhikar Suraksha Samiti.

== Scholarly works ==
- Rahim, Taqi (1999). Mahatma Gandhi Aur Hindu Muslim Ekta (in Hindi). Patna: Gandhi Sangrahalay.
- Rahim, Taqi (1998). Tahreek-e-Aazadi Mein Bihar Ke Musalmano Ka Hissa (in Urdu). Patna: Khuda Bakhsh Oriental Library.
- Rahim, Taqi (2000). Swatantrta Andolan Mein Bihar Ke Musalmano Ka Hissa (in Hindi). Patna: Khuda Bakhsh Oriental Library.
- Rahim, Taqi (1985). Zikr-e-Yunus (in Urdu). Patna: Taqi Rahim.
