= Aasim Bihari =

Ali Hussain Aasim Bihari علی حسین عاصم بہاری
- Born: 15 April 1889; Khasganj, Bihar Sharif, Bihar
- Died: 6 December 1953 (aged 64); Allahabad, Uttar Pradesh
- Occupation: Social activist

Ali Husain Aasim Bihari (15 April 1889 – 6 December 1953) was an Indian social activist from Bihar.

== Biography ==
Aasim Bihari was born in Bihar Sharif and later moved to Kolkata. He led literacy campaigns and organised the Momin Ansari community. He founded several newspapers and Jamiat-ul-Momineen, an organisation that advocated for Muslim weavers. He is considered one of the pioneers of the Pasmanda movement in India.

He died on 6 December 1953 in Allahabad.

== Legacy ==
A biography of Bihari, entitled Banda-e-Momin Ka Hath (lit. A Believer's Hand), which was written by Ahmad Sajjad, was published in 2011.

== Bibliography ==
- Ansari, M. W. (2022). Maulavi Ali Hussain Aasim Bihari. Delhi: Hali Publishing House.
