= Hussain Zawar =

Indian politician (1916 – 2019)

Member of Bihar Legislative Assembly
- In office 1957–1962
- First Minister: 1961 - Minister in Government of Bihar

Member of Bihar Legislative Assembly
- In office 1967–1968

Member of Bihar Legislative Assembly
- In office 1969–1972
- First Minister: 1969 to 1975 - Minister in Government of Bihar

Member of Rajya Sabha
- In office 20 December 1975 – 9 April 1978

Vice-Chancellor of Magadh University - 1965

Vice-Chancellor of Bihar University-1973

Personal details
- Born: 17 April 1916
- Party: Indian National Congress
- Spouse: Akhtar Bano Begum
- Parent: M. Mohammed Jawad (father)
- Education: B.A (Hons.), B.L.

Hussain Zawar (17 April 1916 – 1980) was an Indian politician and a member of Rajya Sabha (the upper house of the Parliament of India) from Bihar. He was nephew of Late Mohammad Sajjad who was elected Chairman, District Board, Saran. He was a lover of Ahlaibait and died on 8th Moharram after reciting a majlis at his native place in Hussainganj village. He was also the Minister for Finance, Transport, Education and Co-operatives and information under the Government of Bihar in 1961 and 1969 to 1975. He also worked in the education field and he was the vice chancellor of Magadh University and Bihar University in 1965 and 1973. He was also the chairman of Bihar school examination Board.

Zawar served as a member of Bihar Legislative Assembly three times (i) from 1957 to 1962, (ii) from 1967 to 1968 and (iii) from 1969 to 1972.

== Early life and background ==
Hussain Zawar was born on 17 April 1916 in Husain Ganj village, Siwan District of Bihar, M. Mohammed Jawad was his father. He did his schooling from Zila School Chapra and Patna Science College. He was married to Late Akhtar Bano in June 1935 with 3 sons and 3 daughters. He was a lawyer, political and social worker; active on student front 1935-44.

== Position held ==
| # | From | To | Position |
|---|---|---|---|
| 1 | 1957 | 1962 | Member of Bihar Legislative Assembly: 1961 - Minister in Government of Bihar |
| 2 | 1967 | 1968 | Member of Bihar Legislative Assembly |
| 3 | 1969 | 1972 | Member of Bihar Legislative Assembly: 1969 to 1975 - Minister in Government of Bihar |
| 4 | 1975 | 1978 | Member of Rajya Sabha (20 December 1975 to 9 April 1978) |
