= Shama Parveen =

Kabaddi player

Shama Parveen is an Indian international kabaddi player. She was born in Dariyapur panchayat of Mokama, Patna District, Bihar. She started playing kabaddi in 2008 and has won several laurels at different levels. She also represented India in gold winning Asian Kabaddi championship team in 2017. She has also been appointed as district icon of Election Commission of India for Patna, Bihar.
