= M J Warsi =

Indian linguist, researcher, and author

Mohammad Jahangeer Warsi is an Indian linguist, researcher, and author. He is known for his background and expertise in South Asian Languages and Linguistics. He is a member of the faculty at Washington University in St. Louis, where he serves as a lecturer in the Department of Jewish, Islamic, and Near Eastern Languages and Cultures. He is a native of Darbhanga district, Bihar, in India.

== Early life ==
Warsi is an alumnus of Aligarh Muslim University, where he earned a Bachelor of Arts in English, geography, and linguistics. In 1993, he completed his Master's degree in linguistics, where he earned a gold medal, in recognition of achieving the highest marks in the Masters program, out of all candidates at the school that year.

Following completion of his Masters, Warsi was presented with a full scholarship to continue his education. In 1998, he honored with a Doctorate of Philosophy in south Asian linguistics. In completing his doctorate, his dissertation focused on the Urdu in electronic and print media.

== Professional background ==
Warsi accepted a staff position at Aligarh Muslim University, teaching linguistics for two years. During this time, he also spent a few months at the Centre for Development of Advanced Computing headquarters in Pune, where he oversaw the development of a machine translation project. Completion of this project included the publication of a computer textbook, which he wrote alongside software developers in Urdu. The textbook was a valuable educational catalyst, furthering knowledge and understanding of computer science among Urdu speakers. In 2002, the book was honored with the West Bengal Urdu Academy Award.

Following his work in Pune, Warsi immigrated to Washington, D.C., where he developed Internet-based curriculum for Urdu instruction, for the National Foreign Language Center (NFLC). Upon the completion of the NFLC contract, he accepted a faculty position with the University of Michigan. An overview of this curriculum included offering an Internet-based course on South Asian film and culture.

In August 2003, Warsi accepted a position with University of California, Berkeley, teaching Urdu classes through the South and Southeast Asian Studies Department. In 2006, he was identified as a role model and "unsung hero" by Berkeley undergraduate students, for his contributions in academic and personal matters.

In 2010, the US Department of Education awarded Warsi with a $25,000 grant to develop university curriculum presenting South Asian languages, primarily focusing on Hindi and Urdu languages. The grant was funded through the Department's International Education and Graduate Program and the South Asia Language Resource Center.

== Honors and awards ==
- 2007: Glory of India Award presented by the London-based India International Friendship Society
- 2011: Hindi-Urdu Literary Award at the 22nd Annual International Conference in Lucknow

== Published works ==
- Exercise book and grammatical notes to accompany Urdu, readings in literary Urdu prose (Diploma in Computer Application), National Council for Promotion of Urdu Language, (2002).
- Language and communication: a study on Urdu electronic & print media, University of California: Creative Books, (2003).
- Multilingual Language and Communication, President of India, (2003).
- Essays in South Asian Linguistics
- Linguistic Dynamism in South Asia, Gyan Publishing House, (2008). ISBN 978-81-212-1010-2
- Evaluation of Media Reach and Effectiveness: A Linguistic Exercise, Lincom Europa, (2009). ISBN 978-3-929075-58-8
