= Malik clan (Bihar) =

Muslim Community

Malik
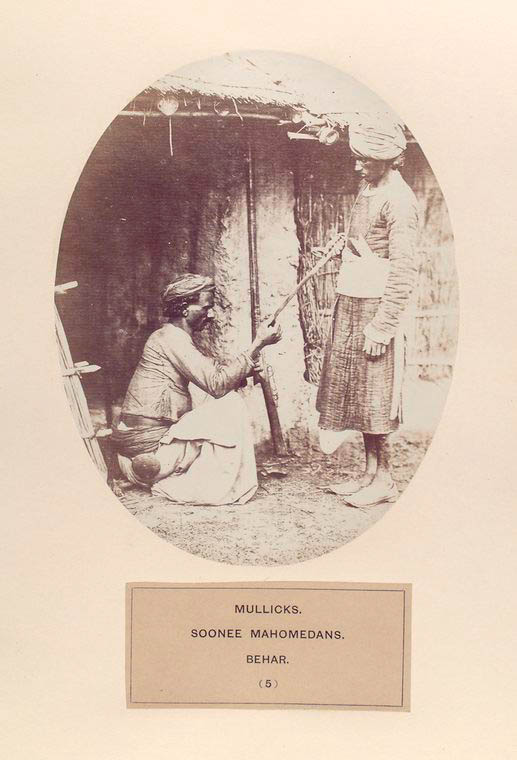
- Mullick, Soonee mahomedan, Behar.

Regions with significant populations
- India

Languages
- • Urdu • Hindi •

Religion
- Islam

Related ethnic groups
- Sayyid

The Mallick or Malik Baya are a small Muslim community found in the state of Bihar in India and follow Sunni Islam. They're claimed to be the descendants of Malik Ibrahim Baya.

According to Bihar Minority Commission report and several other historical books they are considered to be an Ashraf community among Bihari Muslims, which means that they have high social status. They are mainly concentrated around Jamui district Nawada, Sheikhpura, Nalanda and Patna district.

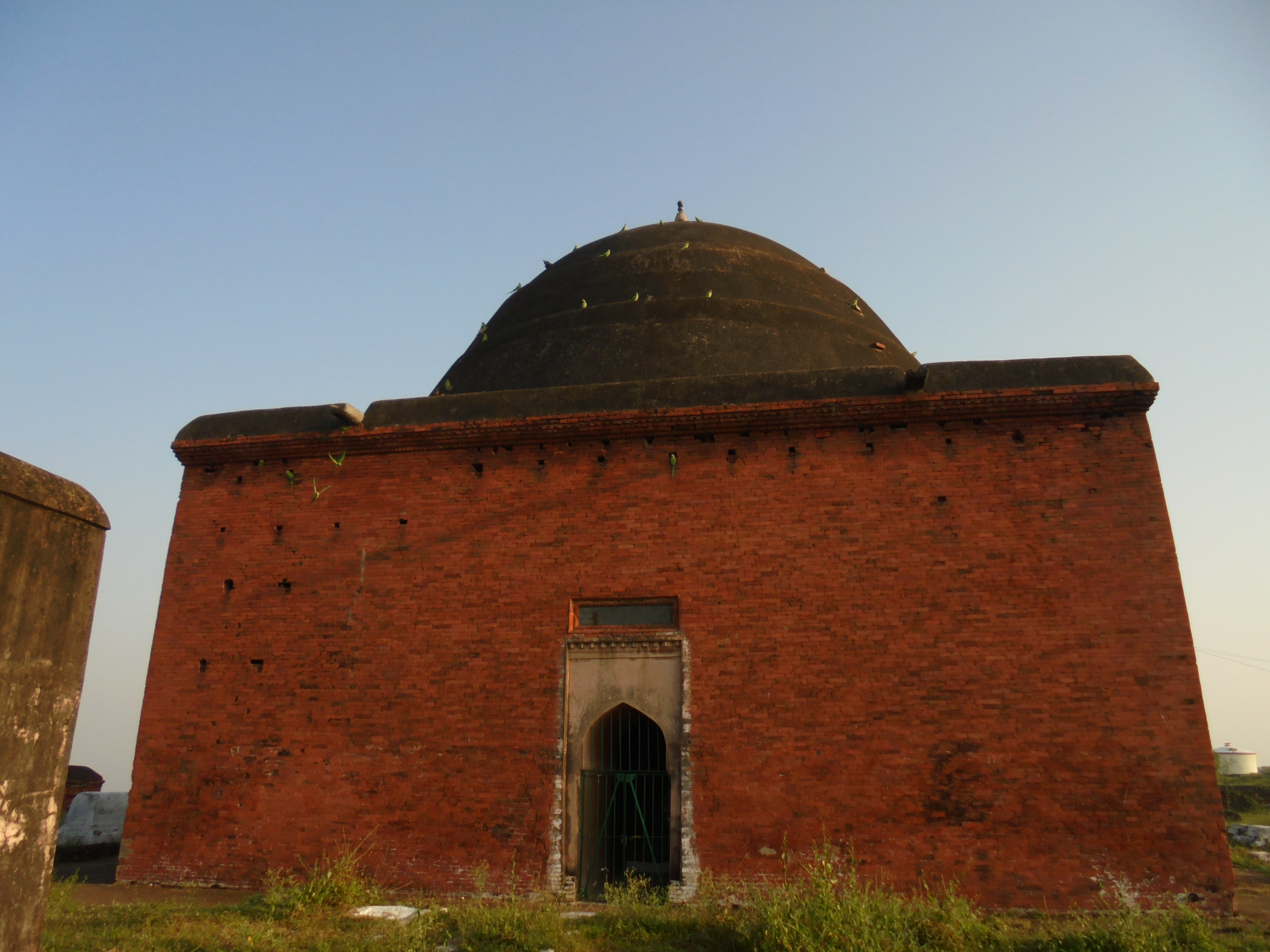
Hazart Syed Ibrahim Mallick Baya Tomb is historical place, being conserved by Archaeological Survey of India

== Social status ==
In 2008, Maliks were included in the list of Other Backward Class in Bihar. All India Pasmanda Muslim Mahaz, All India Federation of OBC Implies, Mulniwasi Sangh, Santyashodak Samiti and other backward muslim organisations struck against the inclusion. Later, Maliks were made General caste in Bihar after protests.

== See also ==
- Bihar Sharif
- Malik Ibrahim Bayu
