= Abul Kalam Qasmi Shamsi =

Islamic scholar, author and essayist (born 1951)

Maulana, Doctor Abul Kalam Qasmi Shamsi
- Born: 25 October 1951 (age 75); Doghra, Darbhanga District, Bihar, India
- Education: Bihar School Examination Board; Magadh University; Bihar University; Aligarh Muslim University; Nalanda Open University
- Occupations: Writer, Teacher
- Writing career
- Language: Urdu, Arabic
- Notable works: Tazkira Ulama e Bihār; Tahrīk e Aazādi Mein Ulama e Kirām Ka Hissa; Bihār Ki Urdu Shā'irī Mein Ulama Ka Hissa; Tarjama Tashīl-ul-Qur'an; Tafsir Tashīl-ul-Quran
- Notable awards: National Award for Teachers (1999); Lifetime Achievement Award (2025) by the Government Urdu Library (Patna)

Abul Kalam Qasmi Shamsi (born 25 October 1951) is an Indian Islamic scholar, author, essayist and an Urdu translator of the Qur'an. He has been the principal of Madrasa Islamia Shamsul Huda, Patna, for about thirteen years. Some of his works included Tazkira Ulama e Bihār, Tahrīk e Aazādi Mein Ulama e Kirām Ka Hissa, Bihār Ki Urdu Shā'irī Mein Ulama Ka Hissa and Tashīl-ul-Qur'an.

== Early life and education ==
Abul Kalam Qasmi Shamsi was born on 25 October 1951 in Doghra, Darbhanga district, Bihar, to Abdus Sattar and Quresha Khatun. He received his early education in Arabic and Persian at Madrasa Qasimul Uloom Husainiya, Doghra, Darbhanga, where he studied with Abdul Hamīd Qasmi Nepali.

Shamsi studied at the Bihar State Madrasa Education Board (BSMEB) between 1963 and 1982, completing his education from the Wastania (Equivalent to Middle School) to Fazil e Hadith. In 1970, he completed his matriculation examinations from the Bihar School Examination Board (BSEB) as a private candidate, and subsequently, the secondary examinations from the Magadh University in 1977 with first division.

Shamsi appeared in the Teacher Training Examination of Bihar School Examination Board, Patna in 1974, completing it with first division. He received a B.A. and an M.A. from the Bihar University, in 1981 and 1988 respectively. In 1994, he received an M.A. in Arabic from the Aligarh Muslim University. He completed his doctoral studies in 2015 from the Nalanda Open University.

== Teaching career ==
Shamsi taught at Madrasa Islamia Rāmpur, Sitamarhi from 1971 to 1972, and was appointed at Madrasa Islamia Shamsul Huda, Patna, in 1976. He taught the junior section between 1976 and 1981 and the senior section from 1981 to 1996.

In 1997, he was appointed the Principal of Madrasa Islamia Shamsul Huda, Patna, for one year. He was appointed to the post again in 1999 for the second time. He retired from this service in October 2011.

== Honours and positions ==
=== Honours ===
Shamsi was honoured by the Bihar State Congress Committee in 1995 and by the Bihar State School Education Board, Patna, in 1997 for his services to education. In 1999, he was honored with the National Award for Teachers.

He was awarded by Bihar Urdu Academy, Patna, in 2006 for writing Tazkra Ulama e Bihar and awarded with Hasan Askari Award by the same organisation for the same book in 2014.

In July 2025, Shamsi was conferred the Lifetime Achievement Award by the Government Urdu Library, Patna, for his outstanding contributions to Urdu literature, poetry, and scholarship.

=== Positions ===
Shamsi was a member of Bihar State Madrasa Education Board, Patna, from 1997 to 2011. He has been a member of Bihar Urdu Standing Committee, Patna and Government Urdu Library Patna. He also served as Chairman of Social Association for Educational and Development, Patna, and Islamic Peace Foundation of India, and as Member of Imārat e Shar'ia, Phulwari Sharif's Advisory Committee, and special invitee of All India Muslim Personal Law Board.

== Literary works ==
Tazkira Ulama e Bihar has been deemed Shamsi's important work. This work in two volumes, discusses 783 scholars, belonging to Bihar. He also wrote an Urdu translation of the Quran with a short commentary entitled Tashīl al-Qur'ān. His other works include:

- At-tarjamat al-arabia (1989)
- Tashīl an-Nahu (1989)
- Al-qirā'at al-jadīdah (1990; 5 volumes)
- Mukālama Sunnat o Bid'at (The conversation about Sunnah and Bid'ah; 1974)
- Tafsīr Surah Fatiha (The explanation of Surah Al-Fatiha; 1974)
- Hazrat Owais Qarani (1975)
- Humāri Namāzen (Our prayers;1975)
- Jadeed Urdu Qawā'id (Vol.2; 1985, Vol.3; 1986)
- Humāra Dīn (Our religion; 1986)
- Tazkira Ulama e Bihār (Vol. 1 – 1994, Vol. 2 – 2006)
- Teen Hafte Amrica Mein (3 weeks in America [2004]; a travelogue)
- Qadīm Urdu Zabān Ki Tarīkh (Old History of Urdu language, 2010; Included in the curriculum of Nalanda Open University)
- Islamic studies (Hindi 2010; Included in the curriculum of Nalanda Open University)
- Madrasa Islamia Shamsul Huda Patna Se Maulana Mazharul Haque Arabi o Fārsī University Tak (From Madrasa Islamia Shamsul Huda Patna to Maulana Mazharul Haque Arabic and Persian University, 2011)
- Tahrīk e Aāzādi Mein Ulama e Kirām Ka Hissa (2013)
- Tashīl al-Quran – Aasan Tarjama e Quran (2021)
- Bihar Ki Urdu Shā'irī Mein Ulama e Kirām Ka Hissa (2022)
- Tafsīr Tashīlul Quran (2023)
