= Rashid-un-Nisa =

First Indian women Urdu Novelist (1855 – 1929)

- Born: 1855 Patna, Bihar, India
- Died: 1929 (aged 73–74)
- Occupation: Novelist, social reformer and author
- Notable works: Islah-un-Nisa

Rashid Un Nisa (1855 – 1929) or RashidatunNisa, Raseedan Bibi was the first Indian women Urdu Novelist, social reformer and author. She is known for her first Novel Islah un Nisa. She opened a school for girls, which is considered to be the first girls' school in Bihar.

== Early life and background ==
Rashid un-Nisa was born in Patna in 1855 to Shamsul Ulama Syed Waheeduddin Khan Bahadur. She acquired her education at home and subsequently entered into matrimony with the lawyer Maulvi Mohammad Yahya.

== Life ==
After 13 long years of waiting, Rashid finally overcame the significant challenge of getting her work, Islah-un-Nisa, published in 1881. It had been languishing amidst discarded papers until Mohammad Suleman's valuable education abroad came to the rescue. With gratitude, the author expresses her hope that Allah bestows abundant success upon him in his future endeavors.

Despite coming from a highly educated background, Rashid un-Nisa did not receive a formal education. A homemaker, she had a keen interest in literature. The groundbreaking Urdu novel Mirat-ul-Urus greatly influenced her, as it promoted women's education during that era. This novel served as an inspiration for her to pursue writing novels.

== Islah-un-Nisa ==
The initial release of Islah un-Nisa occurred in 1894, followed by a second edition in 1968. Subsequently, the third edition was published in Pakistan in 2001. In 2006, the Khudabaksh Oriental Public Library of Patna also released this book, which is currently out of circulation. Rashid un-Nisa, an advocate for girls' education, established the first girls' school in Bihar, located in Patna. Lady Stephenson, the wife of the then Lieutenant Governor, commended Rashid's school.
