= Mazhar Imam =

Indian Urdu poet and critic (1928–2012)

Mazhar Imam (12 March 1928 – 30 January 2012), born in Darbhanga District of Bihar, was an Urdu poet and critic. After obtaining M.A. degree in Urdu from Magadh University and M.A degree in Persian from University of Bihar, he joined Carvan, a Kolkata-based daily in 1951 and thereafter worked as a school teacher before joining All India Radio, Patna in 1967 which institution he served till 1975. He retired as Director, Doordarshan, Srinagar (Jammu and Kashmir) in the year 1988 and then shifted to New Delhi in 1990. He had authored thirteen books including four volumes of his Urdu poetry namely – Zakhm e tamanna (1962), Rishta goonge safar ka (1974), Pichle Mausam ka phool (1988) and Band hota bazaar. In 1994 he received the Sahitya Academy Award for his book, Pichle mausam ka phool. He innovated the Azad Ghazal genre in Urdu poetry in 1945.
