= Hussain Ul Haque =

Indian writer, Urdu critic and theorist

Professor Hussain ul Haque
- حسین الحق (Urdu)
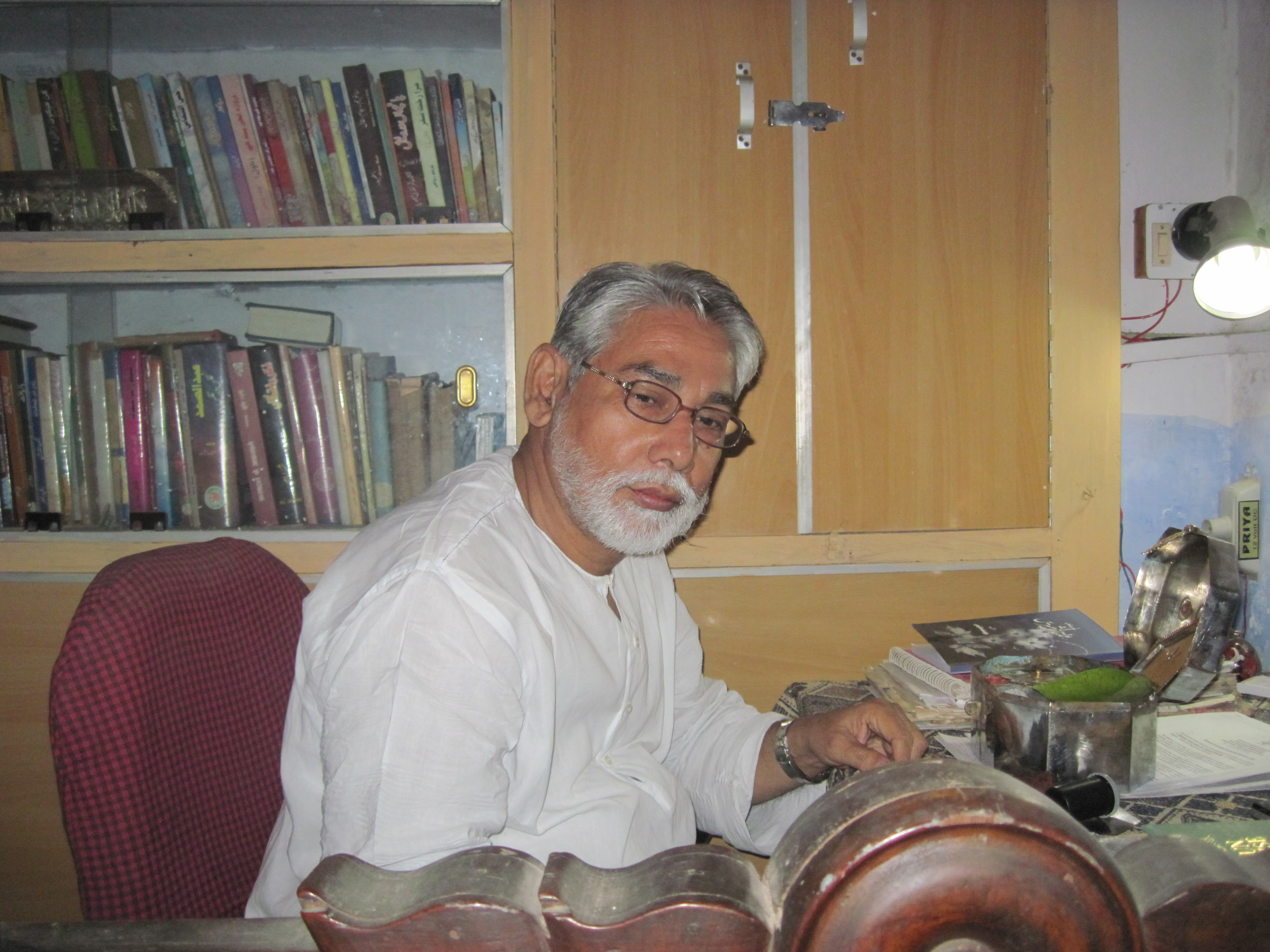
- Born: 2 November 1949 (age 77); Sasaram, Bihar, India
- Died: c.24 December 2021 (aged 71–72); Patna India
- Education: Magadh University
- Writing career
- Notable awards: Sahitya Akademi Award

Hussain Ul Haque (Urdu: حسین الحق; born 2 November 1949) was an Indian writer, Urdu critic and theorist with a Sufi approach in his thought and writings. He has received the Sahitya Akademi Award in Urdu for his novel Amawas Mein Khwab. After a short illness Hussain Ul Haque died on 24 December 2021, in Patna, Bihar.

== Early life ==
Haque was born on November 2, 1949, in Sasaram, Bihar, India

== Qualifications ==
- Primary Education from Madrasah Khanqah Kabiriyah, Sasaram, Bihar
- Ph.D in Urdu from Magadh University - Bodh Gaya in 1985.
- M.A Persian in 1972
- M.A Urdu in 1970

== Career ==
He started his teaching career in 1976 in Magadh University-Bodh Gaya- Gaya, India. He retired as Head of the Department and Proctor.

He has the Research Guidance Experience of 16 Ph.D. degrees being already awarded and 4 research work in progress state in the various fields of Urdu literature and education.

Hussain Ul Haque has also held the following posts in the field of Academia.

1. Prof. in Charge (Persian ) from Dec-1990 to Jan-1995 (Magadh University, Bodh Gaya)
2. Superintendent of Examination
3. Member of Selection Committee and Screening Board of Patna University, University of Calcutta, Aligarh Muslim University etc.

== Personal life ==
Haque is a resident of New Karimganj neighborhood of Gaya, Bihar, India.

== Different aspects of literary and cultural involvement ==
=== Story writer ===
More than 200 stories published in standard literary magazines of Urdu world. Dozens of them are translated in Hindi, English and Punjabi.

=== Novelist ===
Three Novels are published (1. Bolo Mat Chup Raho 2. Furat and 3. Amawas Mein Khwab).

=== Research scholar, critic and essayist ===
More than 30 research papers presented and published.

=== Stories selected in anthologies ===
| No. | Anthology | Story | Editor | Publication |
|---|---|---|---|---|
| 1 | Bees Nai Kahanian | Aatma Katha | Dr. A.A Fatmi | Allahabad |
| 2 | Bihar Mein Urdu Afsana | Lakht Lakht | Dr. W Asharafi | Patna |
| 3 | Sotoor | Aatma Katha | Kumar Pashi | Delhi |
| 4 | Urdu Ki Behtarin Kahanian | Sahra Mein Raqus | A. Amrohi | Delhi |
| 5 | Mear | Wa Qena Azabannar | Shahid Mahuli | Delhi |
| 6 | Irtequa | Hanoz | Kalam Haideri | Gaya |
| 7 | Urdu Ke Nomainda Afsane | Murda Radar | Urdu Academy | Delhi |
| 8 | Aaj Kal ke Afsane | Jab Ismail Jaga | Aaj Kal | Delhi |
| 9 | Fasadat Ke Afsane | Neo Ki Eint | Zobair Rizvi | Delhi |
| 10 | Asr Urdu Kahania | Fitrat ki Dagar | Penguin Publication | Delhi |
| 11 | Kahani ke Roop | Khoi Hawaon Ki Chaap | Dr.W. Asharafi | Ranchi |
| 12 | Collection of Urdu Stories | Khar Pusht | Prof. M.A Harjanvi | Bhagalpur |
| 13 | The Bruised Memories | Newn Ki Eent | Penguine Publication | New Delhi |
| 14 | Scattered Leaves | ESCAPE | Syed Sarwar Hussain | Mumbai |

== Books published ==
- Aakhri Geet (Poetry-1977)
- Pase Parda - E - Shab (Short Story-1981)
- Soorat-E-Haal (1982)
- Barish Mein Ghera Makhan (1986)
- Ghane Jungalon Mein (1989)
- Matla (1995)
- Sooi ki Nok Par Ruka Lamha (1997)
- Bolo Mat Chup Raho (Novel- 1990)
- Furat (1992)
- Asar-E-Hazrat Wasi (Biography-2001)
- Asar-E- Baghawat (2008)
- Newn Ki Eent (2009)
- Nasr Ki Ahmiyat (2009)
- Urdu Fiction Hindustan Mein (2010)
- Tafheem-e-Tasawwuf (2012)
- Amawas Mein Khawab (2017)
- Hussain Ul Haque ke Muntakhab afsane (2019) - Edited by Prof. Sagheer Afraheen (AMU)

== Editing and compiling ==
- Harf-E- Tamanna (Nazish Sahsarami) Gazals-1984
- Tasawwuf Wa Rahbaniat (Maulana Anwar Ul Haque) Mysticism-1999
- Asar-E- Hazrat Waheed (Hazrat Waez Ul Haque) Biography- 2003
- Gyasut- Talebeen (Maulana Gheysuddin) Mysticism-2005
- Fauz-O-Falah Ki Gumshuda Kadi (Maulana Anwar Ul Haque) Mysticism-2007

== Booklets ==
- Classicy Ghazal Ka Imteyaz - Research Paper, 2000
- Esharia Sadat-E-Qutbi - Research Paper, 2003
- Ittehad-E-Asateza Ki Ahmiat - Essay, 1983
- Tasawwuf Pasand Mosannefeen - Introduction, 1987

== Works about Hussain Ul Haque ==
- Shahab Azmi, Furat - Mutalea wa Muhaseba (Patna University, 1995)
- Abdurraheem, Hussain Ul Haque ke afsane ( SKM University, Jharkhand)(2014)
- Saleem Ahmad, Furat ek Tajziyah (Jammu, 2019)
- Sagheer Afraheen, Selected stories of Prof. Hussian Ul Haque - 2019
- Salis, Hussian Ul Haque ka Khususi Mutalea (Quarterly Urdu Magazine, Munger, 2019)
