= Aslam Azad =

Indian politician (1948–2022)

Prof. Aslam Azad

Member of the Bihar Legislative Council
- In office 11 May 2006 – 10 May 2012

Personal details
- Born: 12 December 1948 Maulanagar, Sitamarhi, Bihar
- Died: 8 June 2022 (aged 73) All India Institute of Medical Sciences, Patna
- Party: Janata Dal (United)
- Other political affiliations: Samata Party; Lok Dal; Samajwadi Janata Party

Aslam Azad (12 December 1948 – 8 June 2022) was an Indian politician and a Poet. He was Member of the Bihar Legislative Council from 11 May 2006 to 10 May 2012 being associated with the Nitish Kumar's Janata Dal (United). He was founding member of the Samata Party. He was member of the Department of Urdu of Patna University.

He died on 8 June 2022 in All India Institute of Medical Sciences, Patna (AIIMS).

== Early life and education ==
Azad was born in Maulanagar, Sitamarhi, Bihar on 12 December 1946 to Muhammad Abbas.

He completed his B.A in 1966, M.A in 1968 and PhD in 1974 from Patna University.
