= Yagana Changezi =

Yagana Changezi (Urdu: یگانہ چنگیزی, romanized: Yagāna Caṅgēzī; 1884–1956) was an Indian Urdu-language poet who published several collections over a 30-year period.

== Early life ==
He was born as Mirza Wajid Husain in 1884 in Patna, Bihar. He later settled in Lucknow, United Provinces of Agra and Oudh (present-day Uttar Pradesh) writing under the name, Yagana Lakhnawi.

== Work and contribution ==
In 1946, Sajjad Zaheer persuaded Yagana to prepare his kulliyyat for publication by the Communist Party of India publishing house, Qaumi Darul Ishaat. However, according to one source, "This collection, however, proved to be so unwholesome that we could consider it a major tragedy. Some couplets were added and some corrected (rather changed to the extent that Yagana lost his cool and blew up)".

According to Intizar Husain,

Mushfiq Khwaja has done a great job. He has managed to pull out a poetic genius from the oblivion where he had been pushed by his hostile contemporaries. They saw to it that he was personally humiliated as a poet. His uncompromising attitude in respect of his literary opinions and his unorthodox thinking in matters of religion made their task easy. While still alive, he was consigned to the grave along with his poetry. His poetic work remained unpublished. Most of us had heard of him only as a crackpot with no respect for the greats of Urdu poetry.

In 2003, Pakistani scholar and writer Mushfiq Khwaja created a compilation of Yagana's work, Kulliyyat-i Yagana. It included four collections of poems to his credit: Nishtar-i Yas, Tarana, Ayat-i Wijdani and also Ganjina (1948). The compilation also included Yagana's Ghalib-Shikan and other prose works.

== Bibliography ==
The literary works of Yagana include.

- Nishtar-i Yas (1914)
- Tarana (1933)
- Ayat-i Wijdani (1927)
- Ganjina (1948)
- Ghalib-Shikan
