= Abdullah Khan (author) =

Indian author and scriptwriter

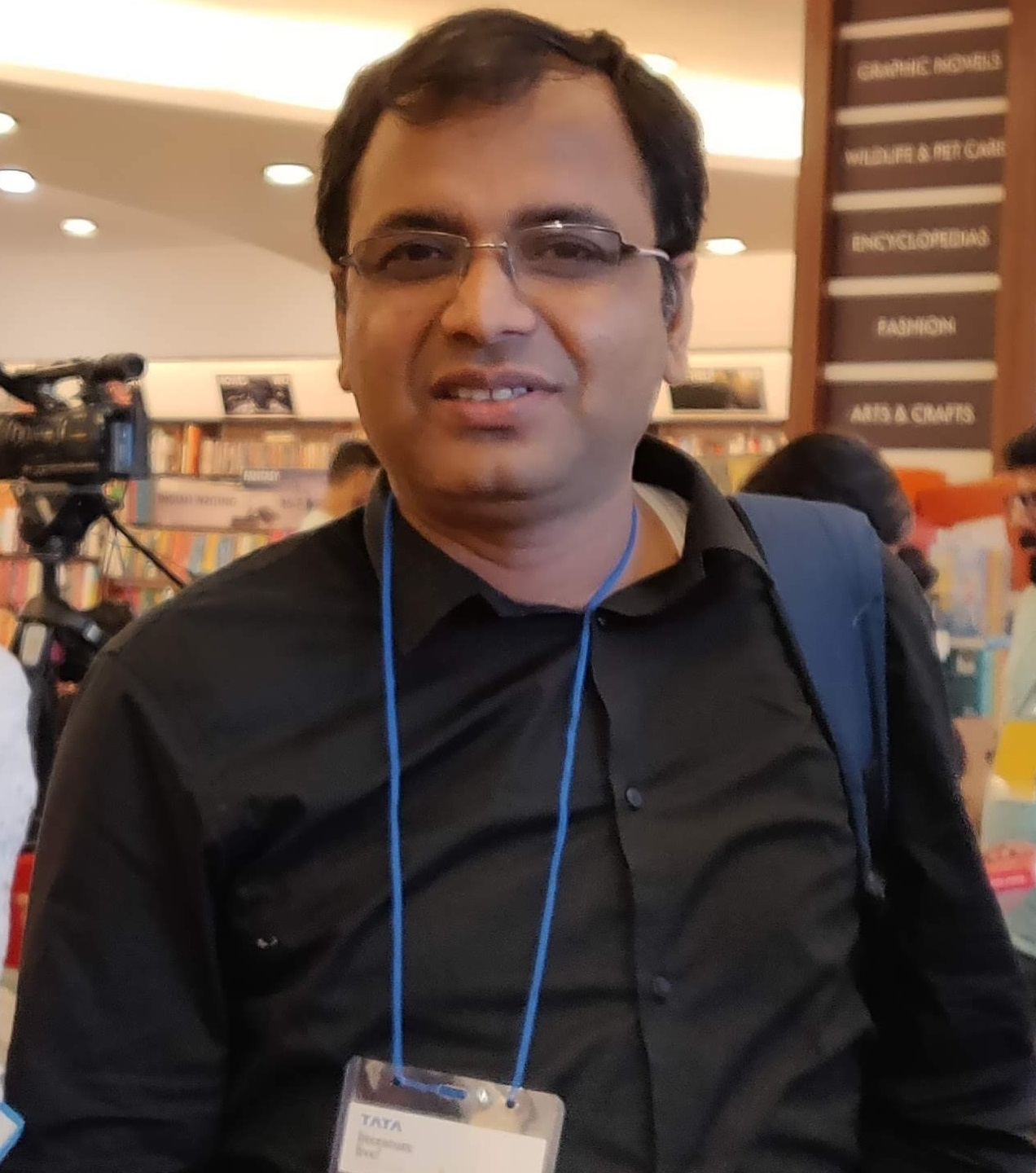
- Author Abdullah Khan
- Born: Motihari, Bihar, India
- Occupations: Author and screenplay writer
- Spouse: Tarannum Parween since (2002)

Abdullah Khan is an Indian author and scriptwriter. He is best known for his novel Patna Blues.

== Early life and education ==
Abdullah Khan was born in the village of Pandari near Motihari, Bihar, India. He holds an M.Sc. in Chemistry from Anugrah Narayan College, Patna, Bihar. Abdullah Khan began his career as a probationary officer with Bank of Baroda in 1998, later joining Axis Bank, and currently works for IndusInd Bank.

== Writing career ==
He discovered his urge of being a writer at the age of 21 when he came across George Orwell’s Animal Farm while helping his brother with an English assignment. His journey as a freelance writer began in 1993 with a local edition of The Hindustan Times while studying B. Sc and wrote first five chapters of his novel Patna Blues in 1997 but left writing after he started career as a banker. According to an interview he revealed how his wife blackmailed him into taking up his passion again and pursue writing. "I used to write long-hand with pen and paper and she would type it out"- he told in an interview to The Hindu.

== Novels ==
After writing and rewriting his novel more than 200 times he finally finished the first draft of it in 2009 but it took him another 9 years to get Patna Blues published. He finally signed a contract with Juggernaut Books in 2016 and Patna Blues was published in September, 2018. The tale of Arif Khan, a young Bihari Muslim boy who dares to desire a Hindu woman received huge positive reviews and got translated into ten languages including Punjabi, Arabic, Marathi, Hindi, Malayalam, Tamil, Kannada, Bangla, Telugu, Odia and Marathi within a year. The Arabic version of the novel was released in Egypt. The Persian, Uzbek and Sindhi translations will be released in Iran, Uzbekistan and Pakistan respectively. His second novel A Man from Motihari ( earlier known as Aslam, Orwell and Porn Star ) is about a man who was born in the same room as George Orwell in Motihari. It was published by Penguin Random House India in 2023. His next novel Patna Redux (a sequel to Patna Blues) is expected to be published in 2026.

== Other works ==
Abdullah Khan regularly writes articles, reviews and short stories for Indian and international magazines and newspapers. Some of his writings have been published in The Hindu, Friday Times, Scroll.in, Hindustan Times, Frontline (magazine), Outlook India, Mint (newspaper) Brooklyn Rail and Wasafiri.

== Screenplay ==
Abdullah Khan has always been interested in acting and tried his luck in it while in college. His first experience as screenplay writer came with a Channel V project based on adaptation of Indian Classics. His story Rehaan Meets Jamila based on Romeo And Juliet was selected but it was later shelved. He has also written the story and dialogue of the film Viraam (2017). His most recent work as a screen writer is the 3rd season of Yeh Meri Family.
