= Ahmad Nesar =

Indian poet and author

- احمد نثار
- Born: Mohd Nesar Khan; 16 June 1967 (age 59); Aurangabad, Bihar
- Occupations: Writer, poet, editor
- Writing career
- Language: Urdu

Mohd Nesar Khan (born 16 June 1967 in Aurangabad, Bihar) in is an Indian poet and author known by the pen-name Ahmad Nesar (Urdu: احمد نثار,Hindi:अहमद निसार). Writing primarily in Urdu, Nesar is a prominent writer of Ghazal poetry.

== Biography ==
Graduating in information technology and working as a businessman, Nesar's literary career began in 1980 when he was first published. His poetic style is influenced by the work of Bashir Badr. Nesar has had four collections of poetry published. These were Waliel in 2006, Apne Virud in 2011, Breg Umeed in 2015, and Sarhane Meer Ke in 2022. Nesar received support from the National Urdu Language Development council in publishing the books. In 2023, Nesar won the Indigo Club of Dhanbad's Literary award.

From 1987 onwards, Nesar also worked as a journalist, and as of 2022 was the editor of the Urdu quarterly magazine Alami Falak.
