= Raza Naqvi Wahi =

Indian poet (1914–2002)

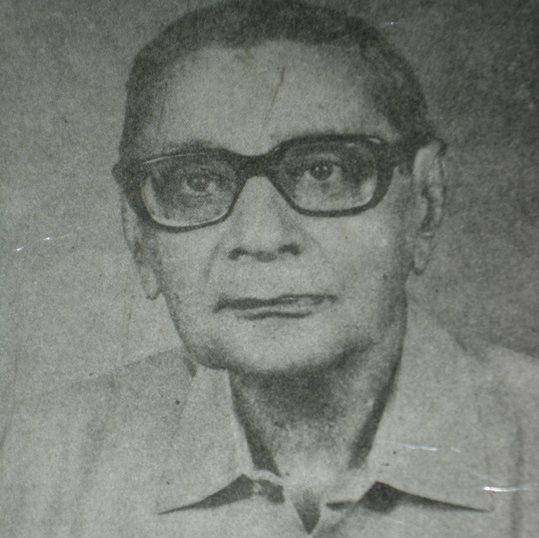
- Born: 19 January 1914; Khujwa, Siwan, Bihar, India
- Died: 5 January 2002 (aged 87); Patna, India
- Occupation: Poet
- Writing career
- Pen name: Wahi
- Genres: Ghazal, Shayari, Nazm
- Subjects: Humorous, Philosophy
- Website: razanaqviwahi.com

Raza Naqvi Wahi (born Syed Mohammad Raza Naqvi; 19 January 1914 – 5 January 2002) was an Indian Urdu-language poet during his time. He used the takhallus (pen name) of Wahi.

== Creative Journey And Evolution ==
- The creation of first Shair (Poetry) in 1928.
- The creation of the post (Ghazal) in 1932.
- In 1939 the publication of the first post (Ghazal).
- The creation of the first poem in 1935.
- The first poem published in 1936 in newspaper ‘Adab Lateef’, title was "Aaj Kuch Khaya Nahi".
- First Zareefana (Humorous) poem was published in 1950 and the title was ‘MLA’.
- The first article published in 1957 entitled as ‘Bihar Me Urdu Shayari’

== Poetry collection (Urdu) ==
- Wahiyaat in 1950 (Late Qayyum Ansari financial supported him for the publication of the book).
- Tanz-o-Tabbassum in 1963, Published in literature library, Gardanibagh, Patna.
- Nishtar-o-Marham in 1968 Published by Zindah Dalaan Hyderabad, Hyderabad.
- Kalam-e-Narm-o-Nazuk in 1972, Dr. Monazir Ashique Harganvi compiled this book and Published under Naseem book Deport, Lucknow.
- Naam-Bah-Naam (Collection of Letters in poetry form to all renowned Poets of that time) in 1974 P.K. Publications Pratap Street, Daryaganj Ganj, Delhi published this book.
- Mata-e-Wahi in 1977 Bihar Urdu Academy partially funded for publication.
- Shyaristan-e-Wahi in 1983, Bihar Urdu Academy partially funded for publication.
- Manzumat-e-Wahi in 1992, Published by JTS Printers Patna.
- Tarkash-e-Wahi in 1995 came to the scene.
- Chatpati Nazme’n in 1971-72 Published by Maktab-e-Tahreek, Dev Nagar Delhi. (in Hindi language)

== Layout and editing ==
- 1944 Zubair Ahmed Tammania (now in Pakistan) in collaboration with him composed a poem on the poets of Bihar and published as "Anothology Vs Isharah".
- 1951-52 He compiled all the collection of poems by late Allamah Jamil Mazhari ‘ Jamil’ and published as "Naqsh Jamil".
- 1956-57 He compiled all the collection of ghazals of Late Allamah Jamil Mazhari and Published as Fikr-e-Jamil.
- In 1965, along with young poets He compiled and publish a volume of 600 pages magazine on the personality thoughts and art of Professor Late Akthar Aurenoye.

== Other published writings ==
- Almost 20 Articles.
- Comments and analysis on almost two dozen books.
- Trial of several books, preface and opinions.

== Other services ==
- Radio Comments and feature TV programs.
- In 1976 for development of Humorous poetry and to make it particularly popular, He with the general support of a few common- thinking gentlemen of the committee, an organization was established named "All India Jashan-e-Zarafat Committee.
- He headed a Mehfil named "Jashn Zarafat" in which many poets from India and Pakistan are invited and it is held on 11 and 12 December 1976 at Patna.
- His Students (poetry): Jahaur Siwani, Natkhat Azimabadi, Israr Jamai, Shahzad Masumi, Qamar uz-zama Qamar, Sabir Bihari, Ibrar Sagar, Muneer Saifi, etc.

== Recognition ==
- Bihar Urdu Academy, Patna for literary services in Urdu gives special prize of three thousand rupees in 1977.
- Ghalib Institute Delhi for the services in satire and humor awarded him with "Ghalib Award" in 1985 and 1987.
- Department of Raj Bhasha, Bihar Government to Acknowledge the services of his valuable poetic dignity awarded him "Maulana Mazharul Haq Shikhar Samman" in June 1999.
- Institution "Aitraaf" Patna in recognition of his literary achievements celebrated "Jashan-e-Wahi" and awarded him with "Aitraaf Award 1999".

== Appreciation ==
- In 1985, the University of Ranchi awarded Ph.D. Degree to their University Lecturer Mohammad Aqeel Ashraf for his research on the humorous poetry of 'Raza Naqvi Wahi'. His supervisor was Professor Sami.
- Dr. Mumtaz Ahmed Khan, Reader Department Urdu B. R Ambedkar Bihar University, Muzaffarpur under the supervision of Mr. Mushtaq Ahmed HOD Women's College, Hajipur penned down his Ph.D. thesis on Tradition of Satire and Humorous poetry in modern Urdu poetry and poetry of Raza Naqvi Wahi. His thesis at the university has submitted but degree is not yet been awarded.
- In supervision of Shafifa Farhat, Javed Akhtar has done research work.
- Various research scholar at several universities are pursuing Ph.D. and M.Phil on his poetry.
- Mau Nath Bhajan in 1983 published a volume of Magazine "Adab Nikhar" on personality and achievements on Wahi.
- Many Poems of Wahi are included in the curriculum of universities.
- Various Poets of Indian subcontinent complemented the literary works of Wahi.
