= Malik Ibrahim Bayu =

Indian Sufi saint and warrior

Ibrahim Malik Baya
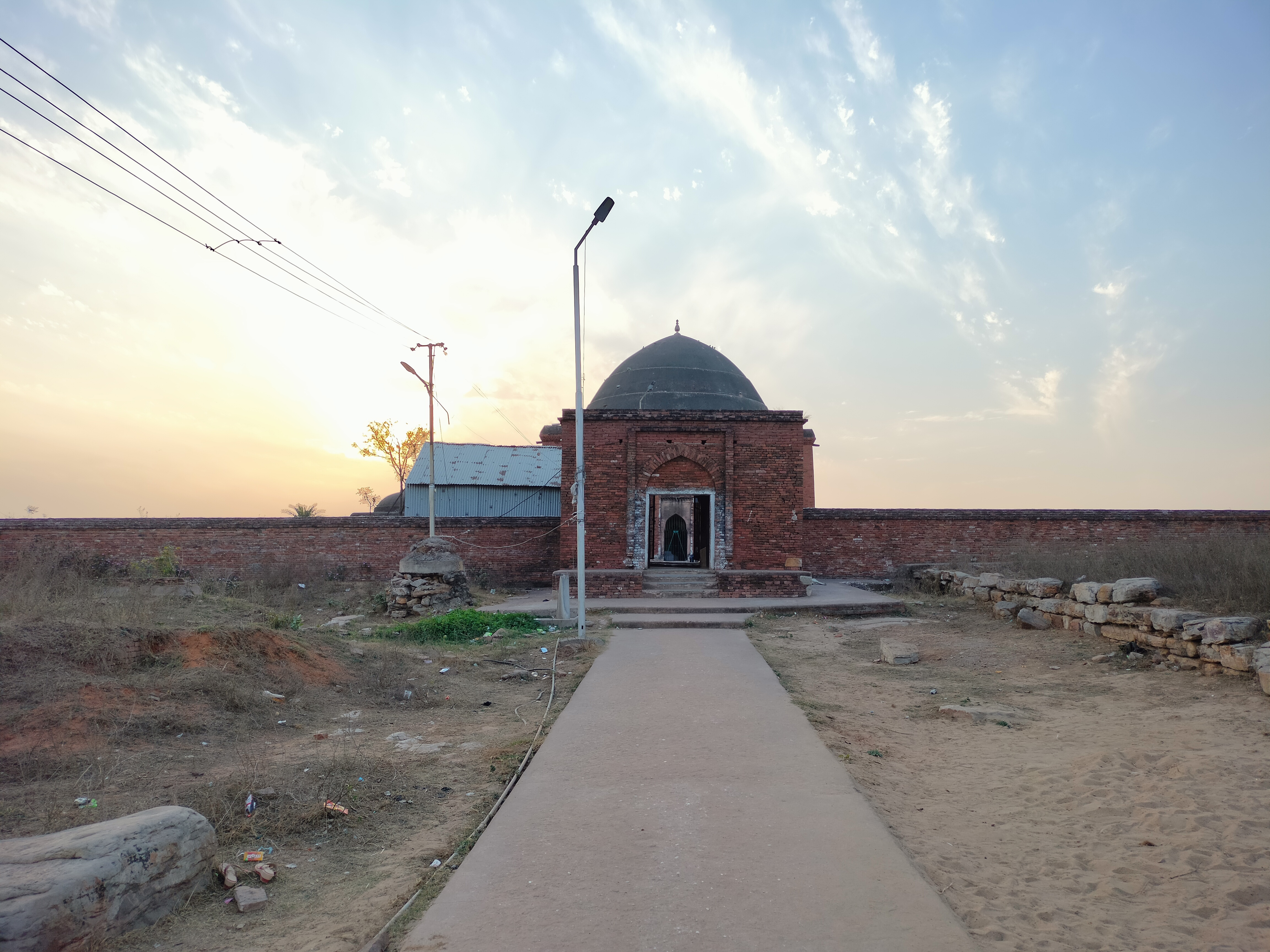
- Mausoleum of Malik Ibrahim Bayu in Bihar Sharif
- Born: Ghazni, Afghanistan
- Died: 20 January 1353 CE (13th Dul Hajj 753 AH); Rohtasgarh, Rohtas District, Bihar
- Clan: Malik
- Occupation: Military general, Governor, Sufi Saint

Ibrahim Malik Baya also known as Malik Ibrahim Bayu was a Sufi saint of Suhrawardiyya order and a warrior who arrived in South Bihar, India, in the 14th century and defeated the tribal Kol chiefdoms, who had been oppressing the local Muslims. He was a contemporary of Sharfuddin Yahya Maneri and Muzaffar Shams Balkhi.

Ibrahim Mallick Baya (d. 1353 CE), a prominent 14th-century Sufi saint and governor of Bihar under the Tughlaq dynasty, is recognized as a Sayyid, descending from the Islamic prophet Muhammad through Ali ibn Abi Talib, Fatima al-Zahra, and their sons Hasan and Husayn. Historical sources confirm that Ibrahim was a seventh-generation descendant of Abdul Qadir Gilani (d. 1166 CE), a renowned Sayyid and founder of the Qadiriyya Sufi order, whose lineage traces back to Muhammad via both Hasan (paternally) and Husayn (maternally). According to Tazkira-e-Sufiya-e-Bihar by Muhammad Hifz-ur-Rahman (2021) and The Sultan of the Saints by Muhammad Riyaz Qadiri (2000), Gilani's father, Abu Salih Musa, descended from Hasan ibn Ali, while his mother, Umm al-Khair Fatima, descended from Husayn ibn Ali through Imam Zayn al-Abidin and up to 9th Shia Imam, linking directly to Ali and Fatima. This dual lineage establishes Ibrahim as a "najeeb-ut-tarafain" Sayyid, a status widely accepted among the Malik Baya community or Malik clan in Bihar, as corroborated by Sharfa Ki Nagari by Qayamuddin Nizami (1995), which details his role as a Sayyid leader in Bihar Sharif.

He defeated Raja Birthal in a war. Malik Ibrahim Baya's tomb is protected under Archaeological Survey of India and is a tourism spot in Bihar Sharif Nalanda.

== Descendants ==
Ibrahim Malik Baya's descendants form the Malik Baya community or Malik clan, a small Sayyid Muslim group primarily concentrated in the districts of Nalanda (Bihar Sharif), Arwal, Patna, Jahanabad, Nawada, Sheikhpura, and Jamui in Bihar, India. Recognized as Ashraf (high-status Muslims) by the Bihar Minority Commission, The community's veneration of Ibrahim's tomb at Peer Pahadi, a protected monument under the Archaeological Survey of India, and annual Urs celebrations affirm their Sayyid heritage. Post-1947 partition, many descendants migrated to Pakistan and Bangladesh, where they are known as "Bihari Sayyids."

== Lineages ==
Ibrahim Mallick Baya (d. 1353 CE), a 14th-century Sufi saint, warrior, and governor of Bihar under the Tughlaq dynasty, is recognized as a Sayyid, descending from Muhammad through Ali ibn Abi Talib, Fatima al-Zahra, and their sons Hussain and Husan. His lineage traces to sayyid kamal (d. 1233 CE), descendant of Muhammad, whose paternal line descends from Hasan ibn Ali and maternal line from Husayn ibn Ali via Zayn al-Abidin |date=March 2026}} The veneration of Ibrahim's tomb at Peer Pahadi, a protected monument under the Archaeological Survey of India, further underscores his prophetic lineage, as such reverence is typically reserved for Sayyids. Ibrahim's descent is further detailed in Sharfa Ki Nagari by Qayamuddin Nizami (1995), which traces his ancestry through Abdul Qadir Gilani to Muhammad via Ali and Fatima, with specific connections to Hasan (paternally) and Husayn (maternally through Zayn al-Abidin). Community records, such as Reyazul Nayeem by Muhammad Nayeem, corroborate this lineage, noting that Ibrahim, born in Ghazni, carried the Sayyid title due to his direct descent from Muhammad's family. The absence of significant disputes in academic or regional sources, combined with the community's historical prominence as zamindars and their production of figures like Mohammad Younus (Bihar's first Chief Minister, 1937), reinforces their Sayyid status.

== History ==
Malik Baya belonged to Suhrawardiyya order. He came to India during the reign of the sultan Muhammad bin Tughlaq and became commander-in-chief in 1324.

When Malik Baya told Muhammad bin Tughlaq of his first victory over Bihar, the sultan replied: malik biya benasheen (lit. O chief come and sit down).

The sultan sent his general, Ibrahim Malik, to punish Raja Bithal. After a fierce battle, the Raja was killed and his army was defeated. After this conquest of Bihar the sultan have Malik Baya the title of "Madarul Mulk" means Malik or Saif-o-Daulat (Administrator or King of Sword and Wealth).

Malik Baya was also Governor of Bihar and general from 1351 to 1353, during the reign of Sultan Firoz Shah Tughlaq.

== Death ==
Malik Baya died on Sunday, 13th Dul Hajj 753 AH (20 January 1353 AD). He was buried on Peer Pahadi, Bihar Sharif.

== Bibliography ==
- Singh, Nagendra Kumar. SUFIS OF INDIA PAKISTAN AND BANGLADESH. Vol. 1. p. 256.
- Tamizi, Mohammad Yahya. Sufi movements in eastern India. p. 199.
- Hanif, N. BIOGRAPHICAL ENCYCYCOPEDIA OF SUFIS SOUTH ASIA. p. 160. ISBN 81-7625-087-2.
