= Abdul Ghafoor Shahbaz =

Indian writer (1857–1908)

Maulvi Syed Muhammad Abdul Ghafoor Shahbaz
- Born: Syed Muhammad Abdul Ghafoor; 1857; Sarmera, Nalanda district, British Raj
- Died: 1908 (aged 50–51); Patna, British Raj
- Education: Patna University
- Occupations: Writer, Poet, Researcher
- Notable work: Zindagani-e-Benazir
- Father: Syed Talib Ali

Maulvi Syed Mohammad Abdul Ghafoor Shahbaz (1857–1908) was an Indian Poet, Translator and Researcher of Urdu-language. He had his research on Kulliyat-e-Nazeer of Nazeer Akbarabadi. He had served as a professor at Aurangabad College and also the first Director of Public Instruction, Bhopal in 1905.

He was the founder and editor of Noor-e-Baseerat, a monthly literary magazine published from Bengal since its foundation in July 1884. He had also contributed to Darus Saltanat and Lucknow Awadh Panch, a satirical magazine.

== Early life and education ==
Shahbaz was born in 1857 at Purab Sarmehra village of Patna district (now in Nalanda district of Bihar) into a noble Sayyid family of Syed Talib Ali, a zamindar as Syed Muhammad Abdul Ghafoor.

He had his early education under Syed Talib Ali and then went to Muzaffarpur Zila Highschool with Khan Bahadur Syed Abdul Aziz. He was admitted to National Collegiate College, Patna in 1887 after passing in the entrance examination, he studied here till Matriculation and passed F. A. from Bihar National College.

== Personal life ==
Shahbaz was married to Bibi Shams-un-Nissa or Shamsa Khatun, daughter of Munshi Dawood Ali in 1875, they had two daughters Sughra Begum and Bushra Begum.

== Works ==
=== Zindagani-e-Benazir ===
It is translated as 'The Unrivalled Life.' This was the first biography of Nazeer Akbarabadi written by Shahbaz.

- Baqiyat-e-Shahbaz
- Khayalat-e-Shahbaz
- Rubaiyat-e-Shahbaz
- Sawaneh Umri Maulana Azad
- Tafheerul Quloob
