= Kalim Ajiz =

Indian writer of Urdu literature (1920–2015)

- Born: 1920; Telhara, Nalanda district, Bihar and Orissa Province (present-day Bihar, India)
- Died: c.14 February 2015 (aged 94–95); Hazaribagh, Jharkhand, India
- Resting place: Rajabazar, Samanpura, Patna district, Bihar, India; 25.13348°N 85.105371°E
- Education: Patna University
- Occupation: Urdu poet
- Known for: Ghazals
- Notable work: 'Wo Jo Shayri Ka Sabab Huwa' (from the book: Evolution of Urdu Literature in Bihar)
- Awards: Padma Shri Award in Literature & Education (1989)

Kalim Ahmed Ajiz (1920 – c. 14 February 2015) was an Indian writer of Urdu literature and a poet. He was an academic and the chairman of the Urdu Advisory Committee of the Government of Bihar. He served the Urdu language all his life and was widely considered a classical poet of the school of poet Mir Taqi Mir. He received the Padma Shri award in literature and education by the Government of India in 1989.

== Awards and recognition ==
He was a recipient of the fourth highest Indian civilian honour of Padma Shri from the Government of India in 1989.

== Early life and career ==
Kalim Ajiz was born in 1920 at Telhara, Nalanda district, a small village in Nalanda district of the Indian state of Bihar. He secured his graduate and master's degrees in Urdu from Patna University after which he obtained his doctoral degree in 1965. His doctoral thesis, Evolution of Urdu Literature in Bihar, has since been published as a book.

Aajiz continued his association with Patna University by joining the institution as a member of its Urdu language faculty. and retired as a professor of the department. After retirement, he was appointed as the Chairman of the Urdu Advisory Committee, Government of Bihar, a post he held till his death.

Aajiz began writing poems at the age of 17 and started appearing in mushairas from 1949. His first book of ghazals was published in 1976 and the book was released at Vigyan Bhawan by the then President of India, Fakhruddin Ali Ahmed. This was followed by several publications such as Jub Fasle Baharan Aai Thi (When the spring arrived), Woh Jo Shayri Ka Sabab Hua, Jab Fasl Bahar Aayei Thi and Jahan Khushboo Hi Khusboo Thi. His mushairas have been hosted in many places including Dallas, US.

== Publications ==
Kalim Ajiz was an author of more than a dozen books of poetry, prose, essays, travelogue and autobiography. Kalim's literary works include:

- Abhī sun lo mujh se
- Daftar-i gum gashtah : Bihār men̲ Urdū shāʻirī kā irtiqā
- Dil se jo bāta nikalī g̲h̲azal ho gayi (selection of poetry in Hindi)/ edited by Mohd. Zakir Hussain, Vani Prakashan Publisher, New Delhi; 1st edition (1 January 2014)
- Jab faṣl-i bahārān̲ āʼī thī (When the spring arrived) (1976)
- Jahan Khushboo Hi Khushboo Thi (Where There Was Plenty of Fragrance)
- Kūcah-yi jānān̲ jānān̲
- Majlis-i Adab
- 'Vuh jo shāʻirī kā sabab huʻā (wrote this book of poetry after seeing deaths of 22 members of his immediate family during the communal riots of 1947 Partition of India).

== Death and legacy ==
Aajiz, who had four sons and two daughters, died on 14 February 2015 at Hazaribagh in Jharkhand, at the age of 94. After the funeral at Gandhi Maidan, Patna which was attended to by thousands of people. He was buried at Telhara, his native place.

Firaq Gorakhpuri, another Urdu poet, sent him a message while lying on his deathbed in 1982, in which he respectfully said that he felt jealous of Kalim Aajiz due to the ease in which Kalim Aajiz could express his thoughts through his verses.

== See also ==
- Fuzail Ahmad Nasiri
- Ghazal
