= Imdad Imam Asar =

Indian writer (1849–1933)

- Born: Syed Imdad Imam Asar Nawab; 17 August 1849; Karai Parsurai, Patna, Bihar (now in Hilsa, Nalanda)
- Died: 17 October 1933 (aged 84); Abgila, Gaya district, Bihar
- Other name: Asar
- Title: Shamsul Ulama, Nawab
- Children: Syed Ali Imam, Syed Hasan Imam
- Father: Shamsul Ulama Syed Wahiduddin Bahadur
- Relatives: Khuda Bakhsh (Cousin); Rashid-un-Nisa (Sister)

Syed Imdad Imam Asar Nawab (17 August 1849–17 October 1933) was an Indian poet, critic and writer from Patna, Bihar. He was professor of History and Arabic in Patna College.

== Personal life ==
Asar was born to Shamsul Ulama titled Syed Wahiduddin Khan Bahadur on 17 August 1849 in Karai Parsurai, near Patna in Bihar, now in Hilsa, Nalanda district.

Asar's sister Rasheed Un Nisa is known to be first Urdu Language Indian woman novelist.

The Prime Minister of Hyderabad State, Syed Ali Imam and Indian National Congress President Syed Hasan Imam were both sons of Asar.
