= Tribal Women Artists Cooperative =

Art collective in India

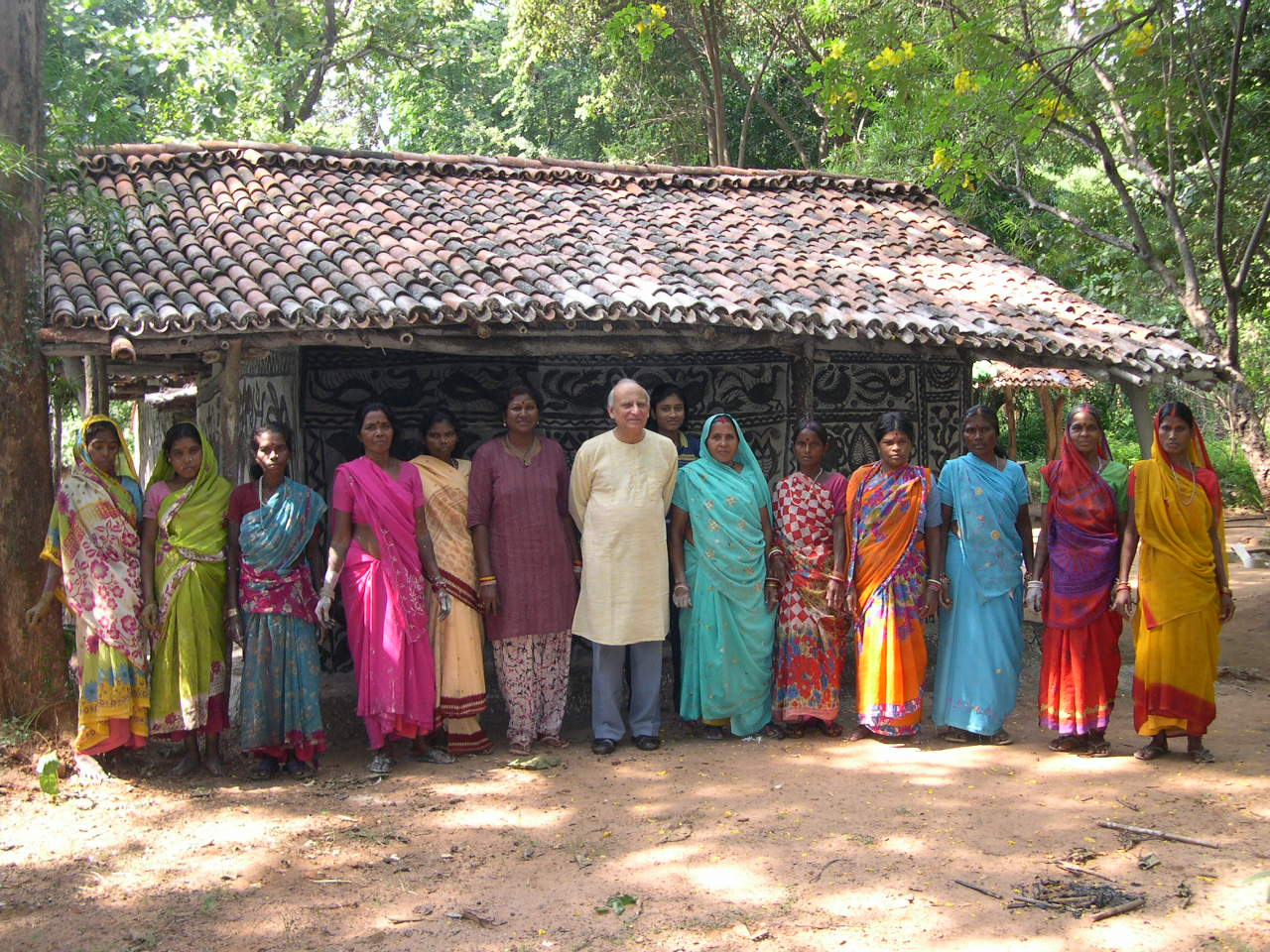
- Group of TWAC Artists in Sanskriti
- Formation: 31 August 1993
- Founder: Bulu Imam
- Type: Artists cooperative
- Headquarters: Hazaribagh, Jharkhand, India

The Tribal Women Artists Cooperative (TWAC) was initially founded by Bulu Imam (Convener, INTACH Hazaribagh Chapter) in 1993 out of a Tribal Art Project funded by the Australian High Commission, New Delhi. The cooperative continues to be directed by Bulu Imam, Padma Shri awardee (2019) as a social worker for promoting the ritual Khovar and Sohrai mural painting tradition, benefiting thousands of village women, and has gained international recognition through several exhibitions in major art galleries around the world.

This unique tribal art project was started with about 40 women artists which began to bring the art on walls of the mud houses to paper and paint professionally. Today, the cooperative's initiative empowers over 5,000 women enabling their art to be exhibited in over 60 international venues in Australia, Canada, America, Japan, Italy, Germany, France, Sweden, Switzerland, and England.

The tribal art created by these women artists over the decades has been displayed and preserved in the Sanskriti Museum & Art Gallery, and accessible for research and study to anyone interested in the development of tribal art and culture in Jharkhand. The first collection of tribal paintings made by the cooperative in early 1990s are a part of the Bulu Imam Collection, and which is made available exclusively through the cooperative.

== Objectives ==
The raison d’être for the founding of the cooperative was to highlight the Meso-chalcolithic rock art of the region connected with the tradition of Khovar and Sohrai mural painting done by the tribal communities in Jharkhand as an economic resource. It also aimed to highlight the issues of displacement and indigenous rights threatened by opencast coal mining, and destruction of forests vital to the tribals as well as tigers and elephants using them as corridors. This art project was created to bring to the tribal women of the region a sense of strength in their identity and as a means of economic support.

The profits received through exhibitions and sale of artworks are divided into three accounts:

1. Welfare fund for women artists.
2. Employment fund through which a third of all earnings goes directly to the artist, and
3. Cooperative maintenance fund.

=== Major collections ===
1. Australian Museum, Sydney
2. Art Gallery of New South Wales, Sydney
3. Casula Art Centre, Casula, Sydney
4. Queensland Art Gallery, Brisbane
5. Powerhouse Museum, Sydney
6. Flinders Museum Collection, Adelaide
7. Dietmar Rothermund Collection, Heidelberg
8. Volkerkunde Museum, Heidelberg
9. (Late) Soli P.Godrej Collection, Bombay
10. Kekoo & Khorshed Gandhy collection, Bombay
11. Daniela Bezzi Collection, Milan
12. Tarshito Studio, Rome (14 - 8’x8’ feet Cloth Paintings)
13. Marcus Leatherdale Collection, New York
14. Michel Sabatier Collection, La Rochelle, France
15. INTACH Collection, New Delhi
16. Museum of Man Collection, Montreal
17. South Delhi Polytechnic, New Delhi
18. Museum Rietberg, Zurich, Switzerland
19. Espace de Congrès, La Rochelle, France
20. S.P.Godrej Collection, Bombay
21. Diedi Von Schawen Collection, Paris
22. Herve Pedriolle Collection, Paris
23. British Museum, London
24. SADACC Trust Collection, Norwich
25. Museum of Archaeology and Anthropology, Cambridge
26. National Gallery of Canada, Ottawa
