= Bulu Imam =

Indian environmental activist (born 1942)

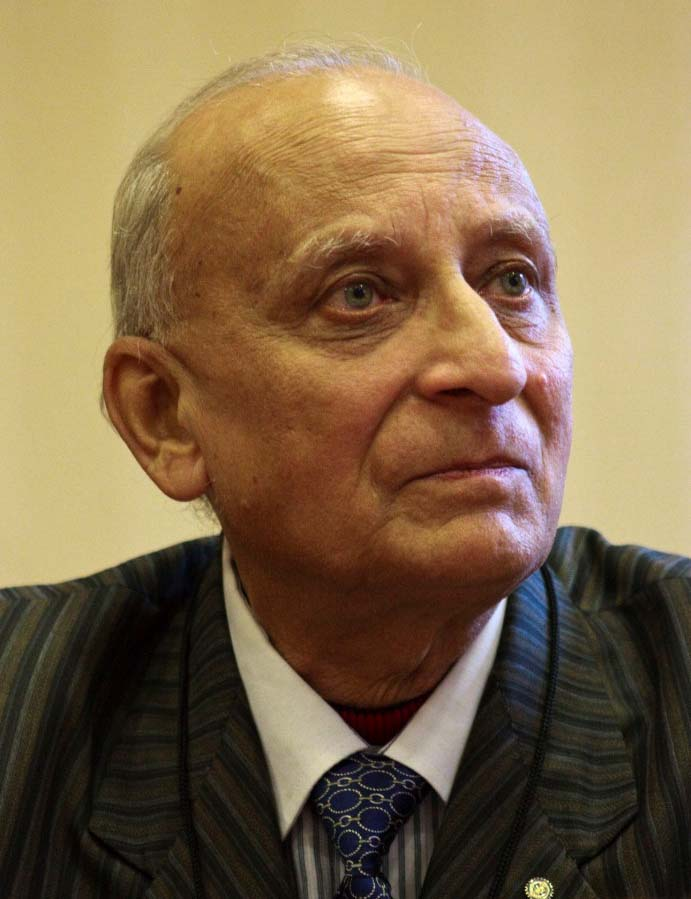
- Bulu Imam, Gandhi Foundation, London, 2012
- Born: 31 August 1942 (age 83); Hazaribagh, Jharkhand, India
- Occupations: Environmentalist, writer
- Known for: Tribal art and culture
- Relatives: Sir Syed Hasan Imam (Grandfather) Sir Syed Ali Imam (Great Uncle)
- Awards: Padma Shri (2019)

Bulu Imam (born 31 August 1942) is an environmental activist working for the protection of tribal culture and heritage in Jharkhand. On 12 June 2012, he received the Gandhi International Peace Award, 2011 at the House of Lords in London. He is also a recipient of the Padma Shri (2019). He is the grandson of Syed Hasan Imam, who was a leading Barrister and Judge of Calcutta High Court (1912–1916), and the President of the Indian National Congress (Bombay Session, 1918). His daughter, Cherry, is married to Kunwar Ashish Bir Singh Tekari of Tekari Raj.

Since 1987, he has been the Convenor of INTACH Hazaribagh Chapter, and in 1991, discovered the first rock art of Jharkhand at Isco, and subsequently over dozen rock art sites in the North Karanpura Valley. In 1993, he brought to light the Khovar (marriage) art, and then the Sohrai (harvest) murals painted on the walls of the mud houses of the Hazaribagh villages. He showed the connection between the region's rock art and the painted village houses. By 1995, he established the Sanskriti Museum & Art Gallery in Hazaribagh along with the Tribal Women Artists Cooperative (TWAC) have promoted the tribal art of the region, holding over 50 international exhibitions of Sohrai and Khovar paintings in Australia, Europe, and UK. He is the author of the book Bridal Caves (INTACH, New Delhi, 1995); Antiquarian Remains of Jharkhand (Aryan Books International, New Delhi, 2014), and has written monographs on tribes like the Birhors and the Santhals. He has made several films on tribal art and culture of Jharkhand. He is a researcher and an authority in fields related to archaeology, tribal and rock art, vernacular folklore and history.

== Recent publications ==
- Antiquarian Remains of Jharkhand- Documentation of 520 archaeological sites in Jharkhand; INTACH, Aryan Books International, New Delhi, 2014, ISBN 978-8-1730-5529-4
- The Nomadic Birhors of Hazaribagh: Their Life, Art, Songs, Folklore & Ethnobotany, Lambert Academic Publishing (LAP), Germany, 2015, ISBN 978-3-659-68133-2
- The Manjhi Santals of Hazaribagh: Their Hunt Rules, Songs, Lifestyle, Folklore & Hunting Dogs, Lambert Academic Publishing (LAP), Germany, 2015
- Hazaribagh School of Painting & Decorative Arts, Lambert Academic Publishing (LAP), Germany, 2015
- Oraon Songs & Stories by Philomina Tirkey- Edited by Bulu Imam, Lambert Academic Publishing (LAP), Germany, 2015
- The Flowering Branch- Songs of the Manjhi Santals of Hazaribagh, Lambert Academic Publishing (LAP), Germany, 2015

== Films and documentaries ==
- The One-Eared Elephant from Hazaribagh, produced by Sanskriti -INTACH with support from HIVOS, Netherlands, directed by Susanne Gupta, Berlin, TV feature film, 2004
- Tribal Women Artists, Feature Film (35mm Kodak Colour), with Films Division, Govt. of India, Bombay. Received National Film Award for Best Arts/Cultural Film in the 48th National Film Awards in 2001. Citation: For highlighting the creative abilities of the tribal women of Hazaribagh (Jharkhand) in an effective manner.
- Early Creative Expressions of Man (Art of India Series, No.10), and The Eternal Dance (Art of India Series, No.11) produced for Doordarshan by Benoy K. Behl, 2004
- Search for the First Dog (filmed by Working Dog productions), produced by National Geographic, and shown on Television in USA and India, 2004. Winner: Explorer's Club Film Festival "Best Documentary".
- The Birhor- Study of a Nomadic Tribe in Hazaribagh, produced by Zee Telefilms, Bombay, 1999 for Television
- The Sohrai Art of Hazaribagh, produced by Zee Telefilms, Bombay, 1999 for Television

== Awards ==
- Padma Shri (2019)
- Shri Bulu Imam was given the Vijay Rattna award on 29 May 2002 in for his work in promoting tribal art of Jharkhand, by India International Friendship Society. The award and Certificate of Excellence was presented by Shri. Bhisham Narain Singh, Former Governor of Tamil Nadu.
- On 31 July 2002 Shri Imam received the Rashtriya Gaurav award in for his work in environment protection "As Environmentalist of the Millennium" by India Institute of Success Awareness. The award was presented by Dr. C.P. Thakur, Former Union Health Minister.
- Rajkiya Sanskritik Samman: 2006 (State Award for Culture) for contribution to culture in Jharkhand. The award was given by the Ministry of Culture, Sports and Youth Affairs, Govt. of Jharkhand
- Nominated for the Goldman Award, 2006 (USA) by Mr. Edward Goldsmith, The Ecologist, UK.
- Nominated for Padmashri, 2006 by Dept. of Culture, Govt. of Jharkhand
- Nominated for Indira Gandhi National Integration Award 2007, by INTACH, New Delhi
- Rotary Club Silver Jubilee Award: On 30 August Convener Bulu Imam was presented the Rotary Silver Jubilee Award for Lifetime Achievement "For His Outstanding Contribution to Tribal Art, Poetry, Literature, & Nature Conservation".
- Doordarshan Golden Jubilee Award: The award was presented by His Excellency, K.Sankaranarayanan, Governor of Jharkhand on the evening of 15 September at the Doordarshan in for his contribution to Tribal Arts in Jharkhand.
- Gandhi International Peace Award 2011 by Gandhi Foundation, on 12 June 2012 in the House of Lords, London

== Research papers ==
- Changing Intellectual and Spiritual Expressions of the Nomadic Birhor in Jharkhand, Expression No.4, April, 2014, Burgos-Spain, pp. 11–12
- The historical perspective of Prehistory through a study of Meso-chalcolithic rock art and contemporary tribal mural paintings in Jarkhand, Eastern North India, XXV Valcamonica Symposium 2013, Italy, pp. 243–246
- Comparative traditions in village painting and prehistoric rock art of Jharkhand, XXIV Valcamonica Symposium 2011, Italy, pp. 70–81
- The Temple Sites at Telkupi ("Bhairavasthan") - Jaina Architectural Remains Submerged by Panchet Dam in Jharkhand and West Bengal- ICOMOS, Heritage at Risk, World report 2006/2007, pp. 88–90
- Threatened Jaina Heritage Route in Jharkhand and West Bengal- listing 38, Updates- The stone/sand mining of rivers, Stone mining of megaliths, Destruction of Adivasi Villagers religio-cultural landscapes and archaeological sites in the North Karanpura Valley, for mines, dams, and Super Thermal Power Stations. ICOMOS, Heritage at Risk, World report 2004/2005, pp. 94–103
- Hazaribagh and the North Karanpura Valley: Traditional vernacular architecture and cultural landscapes; indigenous heritage; the living prehistoric mural traditions of Khovar and Sohrai art of the North Karanpura Valley; cultural lifestyle and the basis for the preservation of cultural heritage tradition- ICOMOS, Heritage at Risk, World Report 2002/2003, pp. 109–113
- Hazaribagh and the North Karanpura Valley: Heritage at Risk from coal mining, pre-historic rock art sites, monuments and archaeological sites including megaliths, Natural and Sacred Sites, Cultural Landscapes, Burial and dancing grounds, nomadic sites- ICOMOS, Heritage at Risk, World Report 2001/2002, pp. 107–112
- Maluty Temples, Context, Vol.4, issue 2, Autumn/Winter 2007, pp. 87–90
- Traditional Village Architecture in Hazaribagh Today, Indian Architect & Builder, Vol.20, no.3, Nov., 2006, pp. 96–100
- Development and Tribals in Jharkhand, Journal of Social Anthropology, Vol.3, no.2, Dec., 2006, pp. 19–196
- Painted Houses of Hazaribagh, Context, Vol.2, no.1, Spring/Summer, 2005
- Some Thoughts on Local Art Forms in Indian Villages- Journal of Social Anthropology, Vol.1, No.1, pp. 41–57 (June 2004)
- On Rockart – Man in India, 83 (3&4): 453-461 (July-Dec., 2003)
- Tribal Culture in Jharkhand : An Interface between Ecology and Tradition - Folklore Research Journal, No.12, Dec., 2003
- Tribal Civilization in Jharkhand – Man in India, 82 (1&2): pp. 211–222, (January–June, 2002)
- Some Thoughts on Rockart – Man in India, 82 (3&4): pp. 419–26, (July-Dec., 2002)
- Some Thoughts on the Culture of the Past –Man in India, 79 (1&2): 161–171, (Jan-June, 1999)
- Story of Kamli: A Birhor Medicine Women, Man in India, 1993, 73 (40), 377-385
- Cultural Spatial Concepts Implicit in Tribal Art and Identity in Hazaribagh District – Man in India, 73 (2), pp. 163–172, (June 1993)
- Cultural Spatial Concepts Implicit in Tribal Art and Identity in Hazaribagh District - AURA- Newsletter of the Australian Rockart Association (AURA) Vol.9.No.2, November, 1992, pp. 15–18
- Cultural Spatial Concepts Implicit in Tribal Art and Identity in Hazaribagh District – Indica, Vol.30 (1993) No.1&2, Heras Institute of Indian History & Culture, St.Xaviers College, Mumbai
- Communication- Cultural Ecology, Man in India, 1992; 72 (1): 121–122
- Ecological Background of Chotanagpur- Its Imbalance and Tribal Communities, Man in India, Sept. 1990, pp. 266–277
- Significance of Primitive in the Context of Modern Art – Roopa Lekha, Vol.LV, No.1&2, Jan. 1984 (Ed.Dr M.S.Randhawa), New Delhi, pp. 56–64
