= Sohrai and Khovar painting =

Mural art practiced in the Hazaribagh district of Jharkhand, India

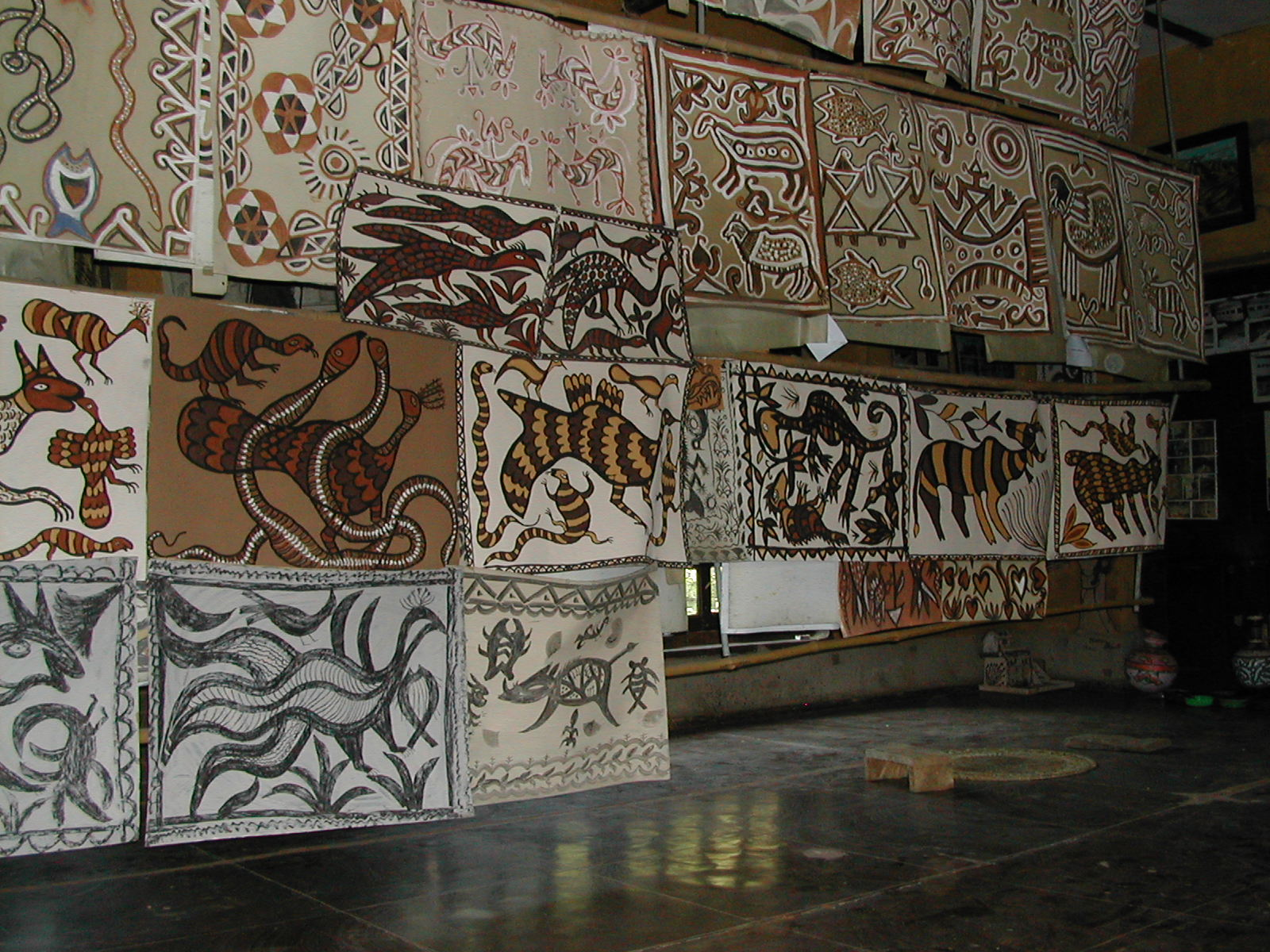
Sohrai and Khovar paintings

Sohrai and Khovar are aboriginal methods of wall painting or mural prevalent in the eastern part of India, particularly in the Hazaribagh district of Jharkhand. The art is related to the festival of Sohrai which is celebrated during the autumn months after the Hindu festival of Diwali. Khovar painting specifically relates marriage rituals among the tribes in the region. It is celebrated after the monsoon season and at the start of the paddy harvest season.

Nowadays, Sohrai and Khovar paintings are also created on paper and cloth so that they may be sold to patrons.

== History ==
The origin of the art form can be traced back to the Paleolithic period between 7000 and 400 BC. Cave paintings discovered in the area have similar animal and floral patterns as seen in the wall murals of the region. The natives believe that these paintings were made by their ancestors. The environmental activist Bulu Imam was the first to show this connection to the outside world.

Sohrai is derived from the Mundari term Soroi, which means 'to lash with a stick'.

== Characteristics ==
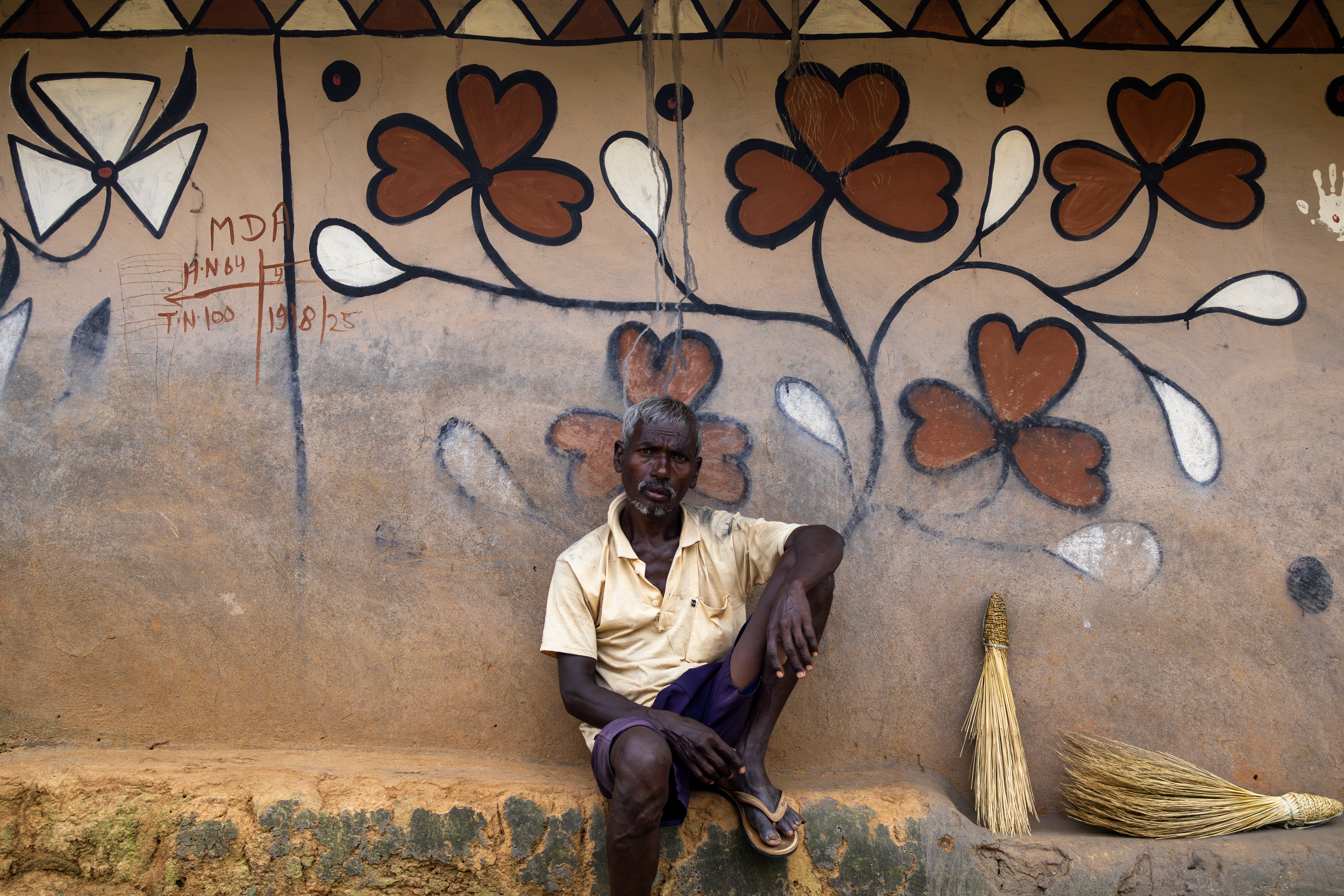
Sohrai wall painting at Isko Village, Hazaribagh district, Jharkhand

The art of Sohrai painting is significantly matriarchal in its depiction as well as the tradition associated with it. The skill is passed on from mother to daughter. Most of the depictions show pregnant figures and animals with their younger ones. Hens and chicks are very common motifs. Other animals depicted in the painting are Indian buffalo, Indian rhinoceros, bumped cows, tigers, wild pigs, and Nilgai. Sohrai paintings are dedicated to Pashupati, ruler of creatures.

The paintings consist of prominent red and black lines, the red lines representing the blood of ancestors and the black line depicting eternal death or god Shiva.

Similarly, Khovar has matriarchal roots and is passed on from mothers to daughters. Kho means house or room, and Var means groom. These paintings are made in the bride's room by her mother, and the married couple spend their first night in this room. Their themes are generally related to fertility and male-female relationships, and they depict recreation through motifs such as bamboo, elephants, turtles, peacocks, lotuses, and other flowers.

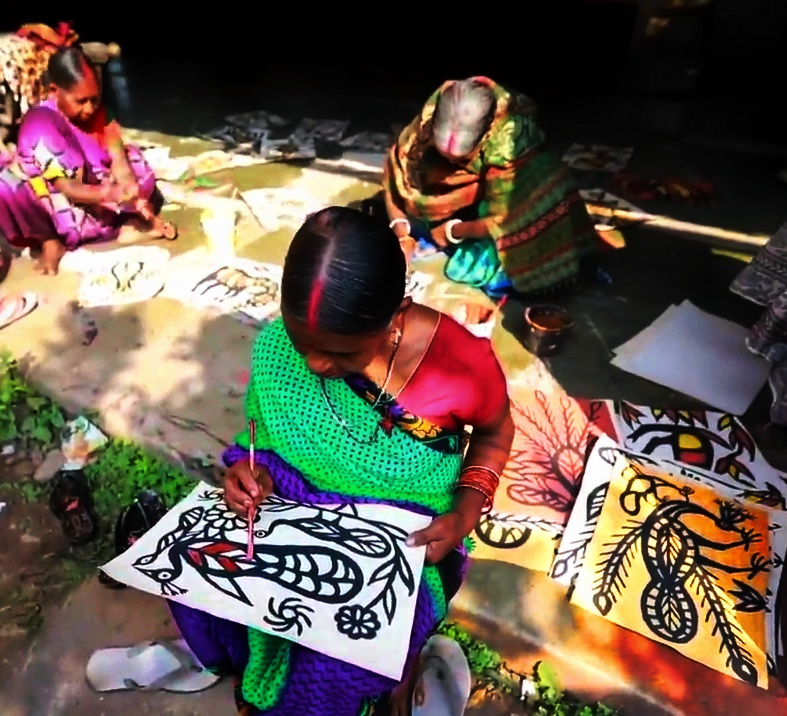
The painting is traditionally done by women

== Process ==
The processes of both art forms starts with coating the surface with a mixture of soil and dung. After this, a layer of white clay is applied. Patterns are created on the partially dried clay with fingers and sticks.

In Sohrai art, first the red lines are drawn depicting ancestors or fertility, followed by a black line representing Shiva. Finally, the white lines are drawn depicting food, as the art form is related to the harvest festival. The patterns are drawn instinctively from the natural forms and the person's connection with nature.

Khovar painting is a sacred art form depicting fertility and is generally monochrome. First, the wall is covered with black earth, depicting the womb. Then it is covered with white clay, which symbolises sperm. After the clay is set half-way, a comb is used to draw patterns resembling a rising Mother Goddess. The figure of a pregnant peacock is considered the most auspicious symbol for the marriage room, whereas animals, birds, lizards, and flowers are drawn to celebrate the auspicious occasion.

== Present Situation ==
The art form has been popularized by Bulu Imam since 1992, when he established the Sanskriti Museum & Art Gallery. In 2018, the Jharkhand government announced plans to adorn trains and government housing with Sohrai paintings. Sohrai-Khovar received the Geographical Indication tag in 2020.
