= Khuda Bakhsh =

Founder of Khuda Bakhsh Oriental Library

The Honourable Dr. Justice Sir Khan Bahadur Khuda Bakhsh KCIE FRAS
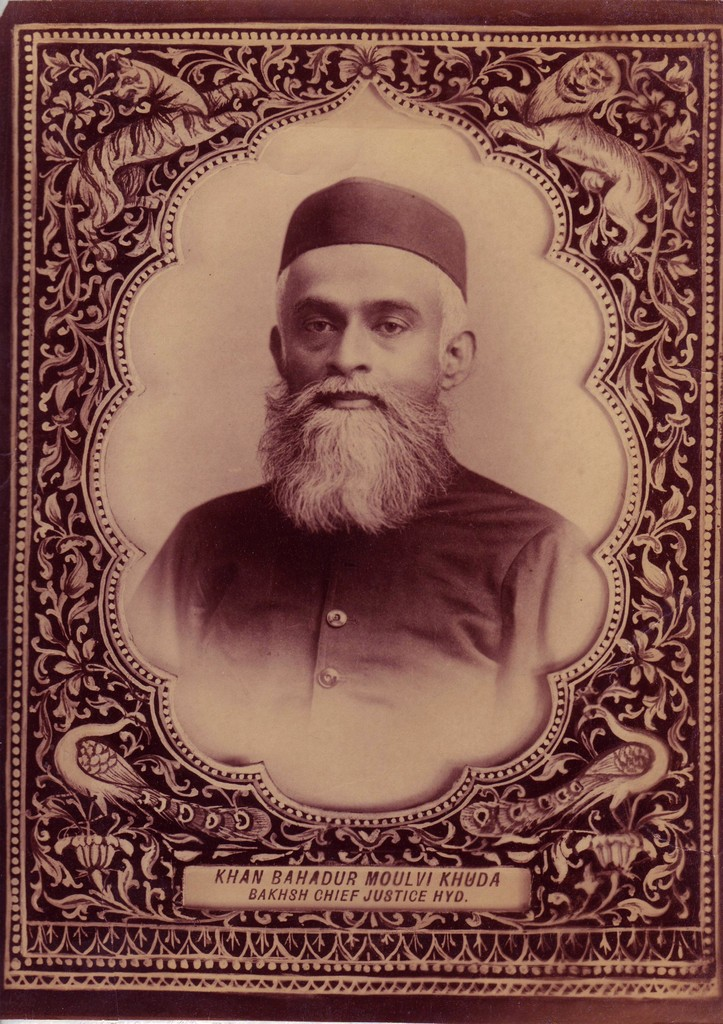
- Born: Khuda Bakhsh Khan; 2 August 1842; Chhapra, Bengal Presidency, British India
- Died: 3 August 1908 (aged 66); Patna, Bengal Presidency, British India
- Education: Patna College (LL.B); University of Calcutta (LL.M, Ph.D.)
- Occupations: Advocate, judge, historian, philosopher
- Years active: 1868–1908
- Children: 4
- Father: Muhammad Bakhsh
- Relatives: Syed Abdul Hasan Khan Sahib (brother); Syed Imdad Imam (cousin); Syed Sultan Ahmed (nephew); Syed Ali Imam (nephew); Syed Hasan Imam (nephew); Anees Fatima (niece)
- Honours: Khan Bahadur (1881); Order of the Indian Empire (1903)

Sir Khan Bahadur Khuda Bakhsh KCIE FRAS (2 August 1842 – 3 August 1908) was an Indian advocate, judge, philosopher, scholar and historian from Patna. He was the founder of Khuda Bakhsh Oriental Library and Chief Justice of Nizam's Supreme Court of Hyderabad from 1895 to 1898. Khuda Bakhsh maintains a strong legacy across the Islamic world for his contributions to Literature and History.

== Early life ==
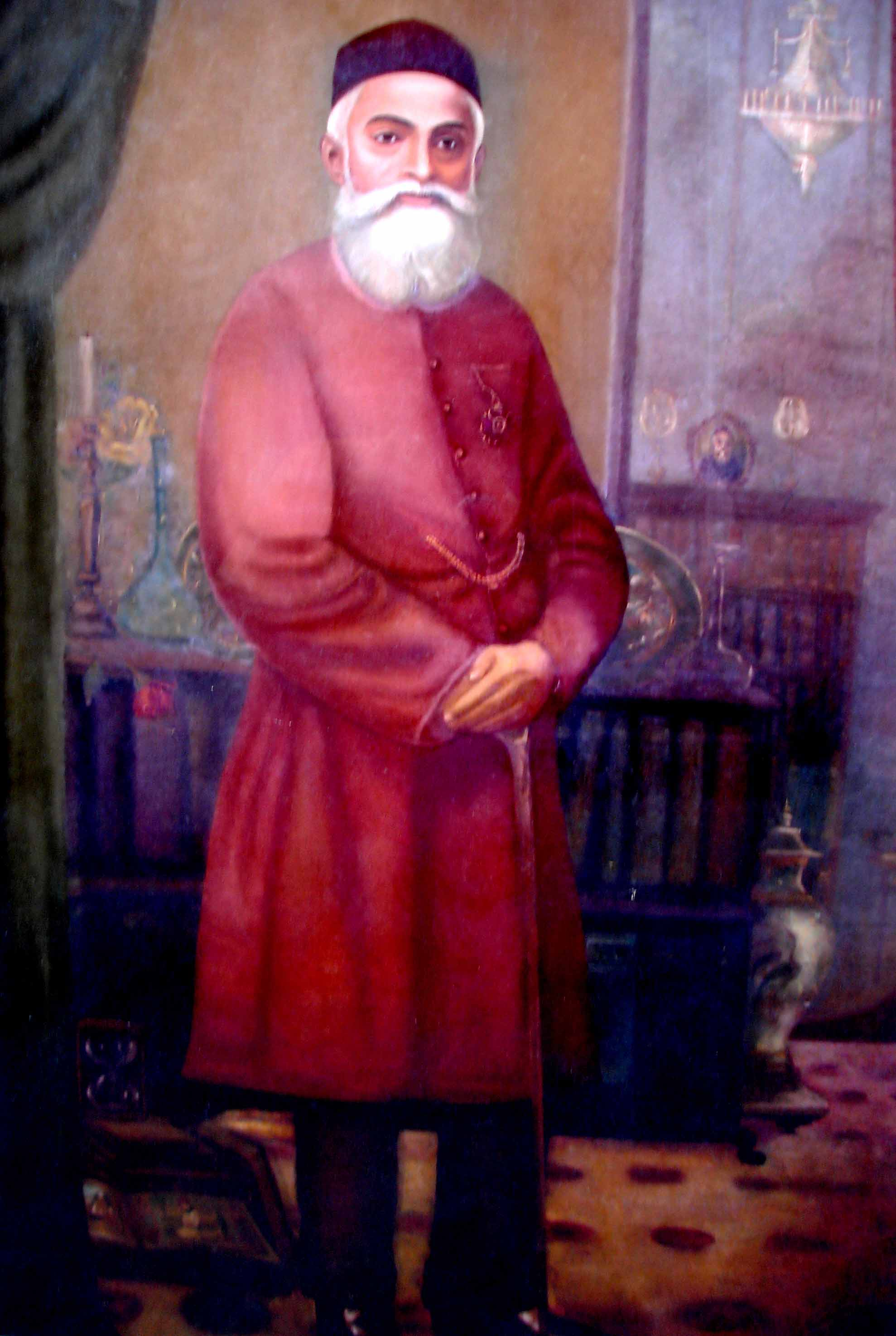
Sir Khan Bahadur Khuda Bakhsh

Khuda Bakhsh was born into a prominent noble Indian Muslim family in Patna and was brought up under the guidance of his father, Sir Muhammed Bakhsh, a prominent advocate and Zamindar from Patna city of Bihar. His family was distinguished in scholarship and one of his distant ancestors, Qazi Haibatullah, took part in compiling the Fatawa 'Alamgiri. The Family of Khuda Bakhsh were the official record keepers who were given the responsibility by the Mughal Emperors to write day-to-day activities across the Mughal Empire.

His father, Muhammed Bakhsh, was a lawyer working in Bankipore, due to his passion for Persian and Arabic literature, he amassed a collection of 1200 manuscripts. Khuda Bakhsh would add to this collection later in life.

Khuda Bakhsh studied in Calcutta under the care of his father's friend Khan Bahadur Nawab Amir Ali, who was a lawyer in the Calcutta Sadr Diwani Adalat. His father's illness however meant he was recalled home to Bankipur and had to start work to help his family financially.

== Career ==
He started his career as a Peshkar in 1868. He later on became the Government pleader of Patna in 1880. At the same time, his father became very ill. In his dying breath, he requested his son to open a public library. He inherited 1,400 manuscripts from his father and opened the library to the public in 1891, expanding the collection to 4,000 manuscripts and 80,000 books. He became the first director of the library and remained in that position until his death, except for a brief period from 1895 to 1898 when he was serving as Chief justice of the Supreme Court of Hyderabad. He was made the first honorary Vice Chairman of Patna Municipal Corporation under the Former Governor General of India George Robinson's cabinet. Khuda Bakhsh met Sachchidananda Sinha while practicing in Allahabdad High Court as a Judge. He gave the responsibility of running the library to his student Sachchidananda Sinha from 1894 to 1898 where he mentored him. Khuda Bakhsh's Son, Sir Salahuddin Bakhsh, later became good friends with Sinha and worked together in establishing his own library known as Sinha Library. Khuda Bakhsh was also a great friend of Shibil Nomani and Syed Ahmad Khan with whom he worked together to introduce multiple reform in the education system of British India.

== Foundation of Oriental Public Library ==
Sir Khuda Bakhsh inherited the private library from his father Muhammad Bakhsh and promised him in his death bed in 1876 that he will open the library for public. He hired Muhammad Maki to acquire books and manuscripts for a monthly income of Rs. 50. In 1890 Bakhsh built a two-story library for Rs. 80,000 which was inaugurated in 1891 by the former Lieutenant-Governor of Bengal, Charles Alfred Elliott. He donated his manuscripts and books to the public on 14 January 1891.

Sir Khuda Bakhsh was approached by the representatives of the British Museum who made a stunning offer to purchase his collection, but he declined. He informed VC Scott O'Connor, an orientalist based in Edinburgh, England. "I am a poor man and the sum they offered me was a princely fortune, but could I ever part for money with that to which my father and I have dedicated our lives?" "No" he said "the collection is for Patna and the gift shall be laid at the feet of the Patna public".

The library was designated as an institution of national importance on 26 December 1969. By an act of Parliament.

== Death ==
Khuda Bakhsh was a very simple man with great vision and commitment. He died on 3 August 1908 and was buried in the library primase.

== Legacy and recognition ==
Sir Khuda Bakhsh was given the title of "Khan Bahadur" in 1881. He was knighted with the Order of the Indian Empire in 1903. He was a member of the Royal Asiatic Society.

The Khuda Bakhsh Award for scholars for their lifetime achievements in the fields in which the library specializes was created in his honor in 1992. Mahatma Gandhi commented on the legacy of Bakhsh: "I heard about this beautiful library nine years ago and I've been looking forward to seeing it ever since. I was very happy to see the priceless treasure of rare books here. I pay tribute to the great founder of this library who has spent every penny to give this invaluable treasure to India."

The historian, Jadunath Sarkar, referred to Khuda Bakhsh as the "Indian Bodley" in reference to Thomas Bodley, the founder of the Bodleian Library.
