= Anees Fatima =

Indian politician (1901–1979)

Lady Anees Fatima
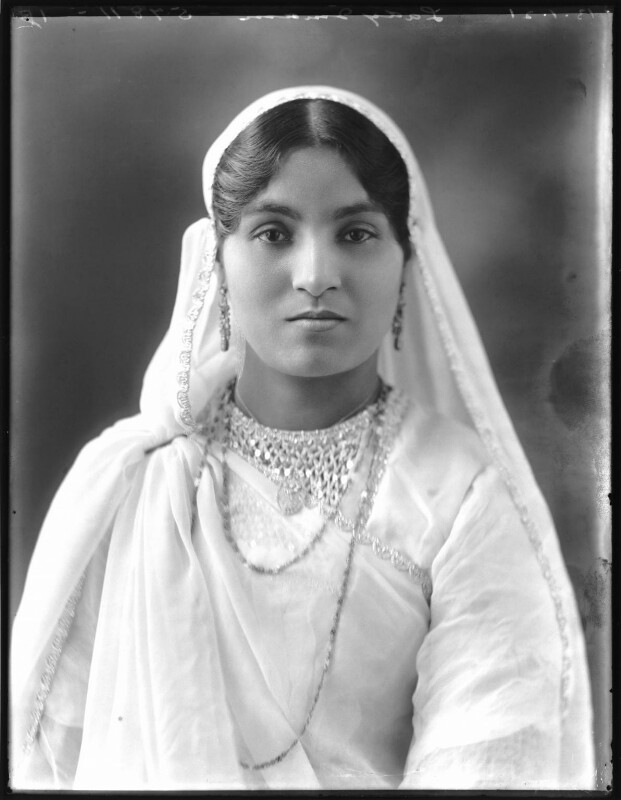
- Crop of photo by Bassano Ltd in 1924
- Born: Anees Karim Fatima; 1901; Patna, Bihar, British India
- Died: 1979 (aged 77–78); Patna, Bihar, India
- Education: Badshah Nawaz Rizvi School
- Occupations: Philanthropist, Freedom fighter, politician
- Years active: 1918–1970
- Spouse: Syed Ali Imam
- Relatives: Sir Sultan Ahmed (cousin), Syed Hasan Imam (brother-in-law); Sir Khuda Bakhsh (uncle)

Anees Fatima (1901–1979) also known as Lady Imam was an Indian freedom fighter, politician, philanthropist and teacher from Patna, Bihar who played a significant role in the anti-colonial movement of British India and is considered to be one of the founders of modern Bihar. She was married to Sir Syed Ali Imam.

== Early life ==
Anees received her early education from Badshah Nawaz Rizvi School. From a younger age, she actively participated in India's freedom struggle and fought against social injustices and the practice of purdah among both Hindu and Muslim women.

== Career ==
During the Non-cooperation movement (1920–22), She organized large-scale protests against liquor shops in Patna with her daughter Mehmuda Sami. She was appointed to lead the committee sent by the All India Congress to England to protest the Montague-Chelmsford Reforms. This distinction made her the first woman from Bihar to embark on a political journey to England. In addition, she was active in the civil disobedience movement (1930–34) and led a procession of nearly 3,000 women in Patna in 1938, resulting in warrants being issued against her by the British.

Lady Imam was an independent candidate who contested and won the seat in the 1937 elections from Bihar. She was the first woman to be elected as an MLA from Bihar. She was a dedicated member of the Anjuman Tarraqi-e-Urdu, an organization that actively campaigned for the recognition of Urdu as the secondary language of Bihar. After independence, she supported the cause of education in Bihar and was an active member of the Khuda Bakhsh Oriental Public Library and the Bihar Government Urdu Library.

== Personal life ==
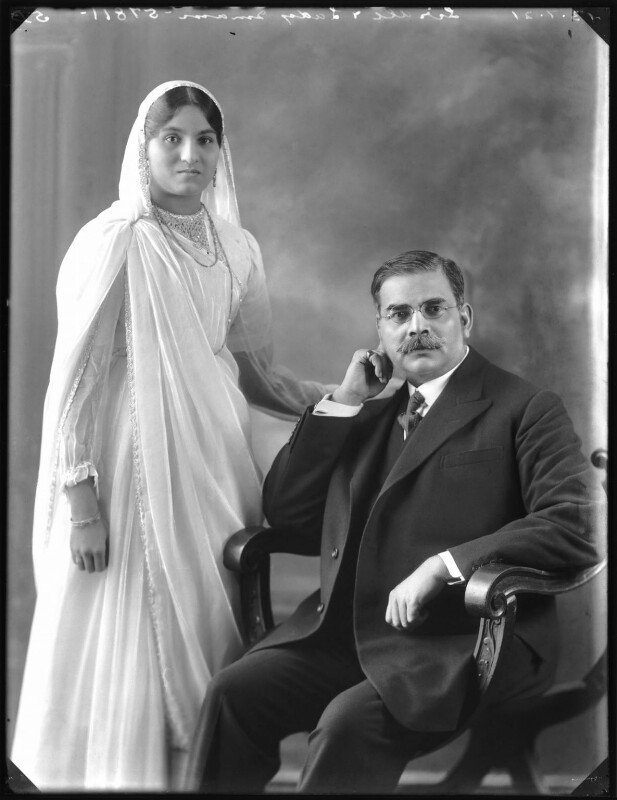
Anees Fatimah and Sir Saiyid Ali Imam in 1921

She was married to Syed Ali Imam after the demise of his second wife, Mariam. In Ranchi, Bihar, Sir Syed Ali Imam commissioned the construction of a residence for the couple, designed in the style of a Scottish castle. It is referred to as "Anees Castle" by the local community, It is situated near the junction of Phulwari Sharif Road. The construction of the residence was completed in 1932. Lady Anees Fatimah's husband died the same year. Subsequently, she dedicated herself to her political career.

== Legacy ==
A locality in Patna known as Anisabad is named in her honor.
