= Syed Hasan Imam =

Indian politician (1871–1933)

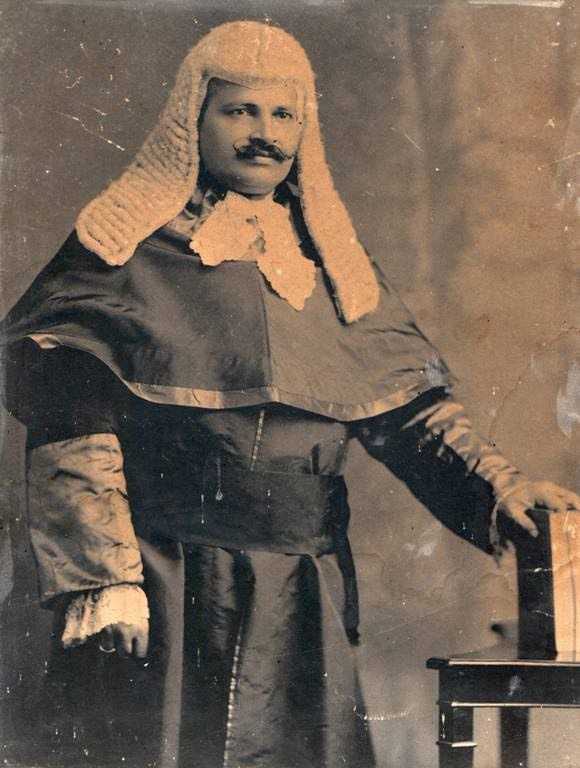
- Born: 31 August 1871; Patna, Bengal Presidency, British India
- Died: 19 April 1933 (aged 61); Patna, Bihar and Orissa Province, British India
- Occupations: Barrister, freedom fighter
- Relatives: Sir Sultan Ahmed (cousin); Syed Ali Imam (brother); Sir Khuda Bakhsh (uncle); Anees Fatima (sister-in-law)

Syed Hasan Imam (31 August 1871 – 19 April 1933) was an Indian barrister and politician who served as the President of the Indian National Congress and was elected in September 1918.

== Biography ==
He was the fourth Muslim (After Badruddin Tyabji, Rahimtulla M. Sayani and Nawab Syed Muhammad Bahadur) to become the President of Indian National Congress.

One of his ancestors was the private tutor to Mughal emperor Aurangzeb. Hasan Imam's father was a professor of history at Patna College. By his first wife, Syed Hasan Imam had a son Syed Medhi Imam, educated at Harrow and Oxford University, a barrister of the Supreme Court of India and scholar of Latin and Greek. Hasan Imam also married an Indo-French lady, and Bulu Imam the human rights campaigner, and wildlife expert is their grandson.

Regarded as one of India's finest barristers, some barristers such as Chittaranjan Das (C.R. Das) and H.D. Bose considered Hasan as the best barrister in British India. He is related to many other barristers besides those within his own immediate family including Sir Sultan Ahmed and Syed Abdul Aziz. Hasan Imam's Cambridge University educated nephew Syed Jafar Imam was also his son-in-law and later became a Supreme Court judge.

== Law and political career ==
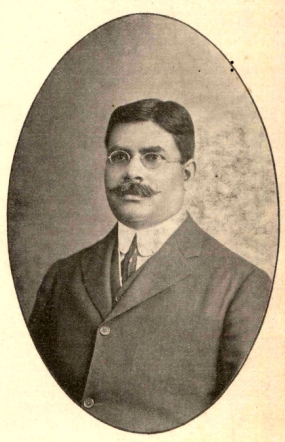

Hasan Imam, son of lmdad Imam, and younger brother of freedom fighter Sir Ali Imam, was born at Neora village, Patna district, Bihar on 31 August 1871. A Shia Muslim by faith, he belonged to a distinguished, educated landed family. After a course of schooling, interrupted frequently by ill-health, he left for England in July 1889 and joined the Middle Temple. While there, he campaigned actively for Dadabhai Naoroji during the General Election of England in 1891. He was called to the Bar in 1892; he returned home the same year and started law practice in the Calcutta High Court. Hasan Imam became a Judge of the Calcutta High Court in 1912.

On the establishment of the Patna High Court in March 1916, Imam resigned the Judgeship of the Calcutta High Court and started practice at Patna. In 1921, he was nominated a Member of the Bihar and Orissa Legislative Council. From 1908 onwards he took part in political affairs. In October 1909, he was elected president of the Bihar Congress Committee and in the next month he presided over the fourth session of the Bihar Students' Conference. He resumed political activity on a larger scale after resigning the Judgeship in 1916. Hasan Imam was one of the prominent Indian leaders who called upon Montagu, the Secretary of State for India, in November 1917 and was listed by him among "the real giants of the Indian Political World". He presided over the special session of the Indian National Congress held at Bombay, 1918, to consider the Montagu–Chelmsford Reforms Scheme. It was an important, but difficult, session to handle because opinion was sharply divided on the merits of the scheme. Hasan Imam played a moderating role. It was his opinion, where he thought a hostile environment between Hindus and Muslims would make it impossible to achieve freedom from the British rule.

A staunch constitutionalist, he was opposed to the ideology of the Non-cooperation movement. Hasan Imam took a leading part in the Khilafat Movement. He joined the Civil Disobedience Movement in 1930 and was elected Secretary of the Swadeshi League formed in Patna. He actively campaigned for the boycott of foreign goods and use of Khaddar. Earlier in 1927, he "materially conduced to the success" of the boycott of the Simon Commission in Bihar. Hasan Imam was a strong advocate of social reforms, particularly the amelioration of the position of women and the depressed classes. As a member of the Tikari Board of Trustees, he promoted schemes for girls' education. He exposed the economic exploitation of the country, both under the Company and the Imperial rule. He was President of the Board of Trustees of the Biharee, the leading English daily of Bihar; he was also one of the founders of the succeeding Searchlight.

== Death ==
He died on 19 April 1933 and lies buried on the banks of river Sone in Japla, a town in Palamu district near the border of Bihar and Jharkhand.
