= Indian Architect & Builder =

Indian Architect & Builder (IA&B) is an architecture magazine in India. Published in Mumbai, India by Jasubhai Media Pvt. Ltd, the magazine was started in 1986. It is one of the oldest publications on architecture and design practices in India. The magazine had featured works from some of the most significant architecture practices in India having an extensive archive of projects and writings.

With its annual conference - The 361°, IA&B curates a very meaningful dialogue on architecture and is one of the largest contributors to international discourse on architecture in India.
