= Syed Ali Imam =

Indian politician (1869–1932)

Sir Syed Ali Imam KCSI
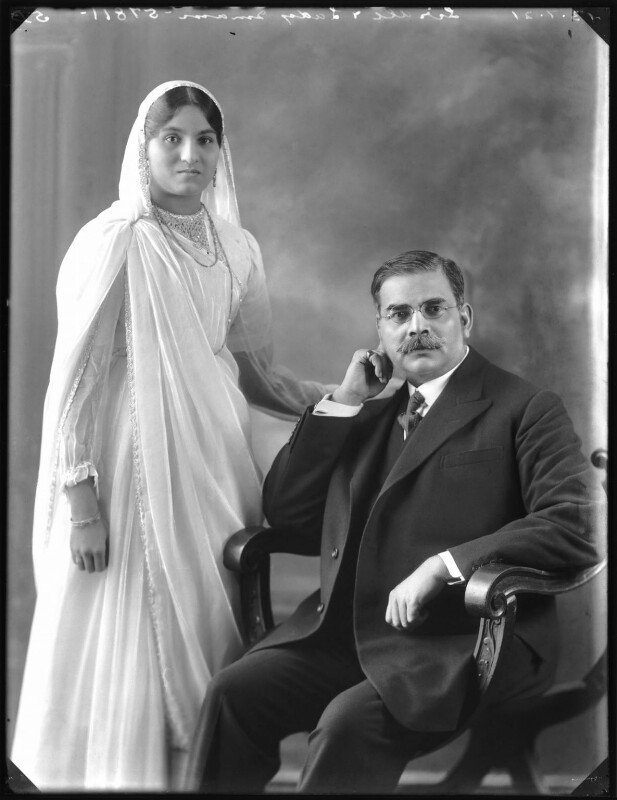
- With his wife Anees Fatima in 1921
- Born: 11 February 1869; Patna, Bengal Presidency, British India
- Died: 31 October 1932 (aged 63); Ranchi, Bihar and Orissa Province, British India
- Resting place: Kokar Chowk
- Spouse(s): Mariam; Anees Fatima
- Children: Syed Jafar Imam
- Relatives: Syed Imdad Imam (Father); Sir Khuda Bakhsh (Uncle); Syed Abdul Hasan Khan Sahib (Uncle); Sir Sultan Ahmed(cousin), Syed Hasan Imam (brother); Asif Ahmed (Great Great Grandson)

Sir Syed Ali Imam, KCSI (11 February 1869 – 31 October 1932), also known as Sir Saiyid Ali Imam, was an Indian barrister and freedom fighter who was the first Indian to represent India at the round table of 1929.

He served as Prime Minister of Hyderabad State from 1919 to 1922. He was one of the founders of Modern Bihar.

== Biography ==
Syed Ali Imam was born on 11 February 1869, in Karai Parsari village, near Fatuha, Bihar. He was the son of Nawab Syed Imdad Imam Bin Syed Wahiduddin Khan Bahadur and the brother of Syed Hasan Imam. In 1887, he went to London to study law and was called to the English bar by the Middle Temple. He returned to India in 1890. He was a member of the Bihar District Board. In 1909, he was appointed to the Bengal Legislative Council.

In 1917, Imam was appointed a Justice of the Patna High Court. Later, he worked as the Chief Minister of the Hyderabad State. After that, he resumed private practice in 1920 and joined the Indian independence movement. Imam served as President of Muslim League. He was knighted in 1908. He became the second Indian to hold the post of law member of the government of India, assuming the position after Satyendra P. Sinha resigned in November 1910. He was responsible for convincing the board to move the capital city of Kolkata to Delhi. he was married to Anees Fatima.

Imam spoke several languages and was a good orator. On 17 October 1932, He died in Ranchi and was buried at Kokar Chowk in Hazaribagh road.

== See also ==
- List of prime ministers of Hyderabad State
