= Patna College =

College in Bihar

- Seal of Patna College
- Other name: PC
- Type: Public
- Established: 9 January 1863; 163 years ago
- Affiliations: Patna University
- Principal: Sanjay Kumar Singha
- Location: Patna, Bihar, India; 25.62°N 85.16°E
- Campus: Urban
- Website: patnacollege.ac.in

Patna College is a constituent state aided College of Patna University which was established in 1863 during the British Raj. It offers undergraduate and postgraduate courses in science, arts and commerce as well as some vocational courses like BBA, BMC and BCA. The college is affiliated to Patna University. It is also considered to be the oldest institution of higher education in Bihar.

== History ==
Patna College is the oldest institution of higher education in Bihar. Nearly every major college of Patna- Patna Law College, Engineering College (National Institute of Technology, Patna at present), Patna Science College and Vanijya Mahavidyala, has their roots from this college. Patna College was established on 9 January 1863, during the British Raj.

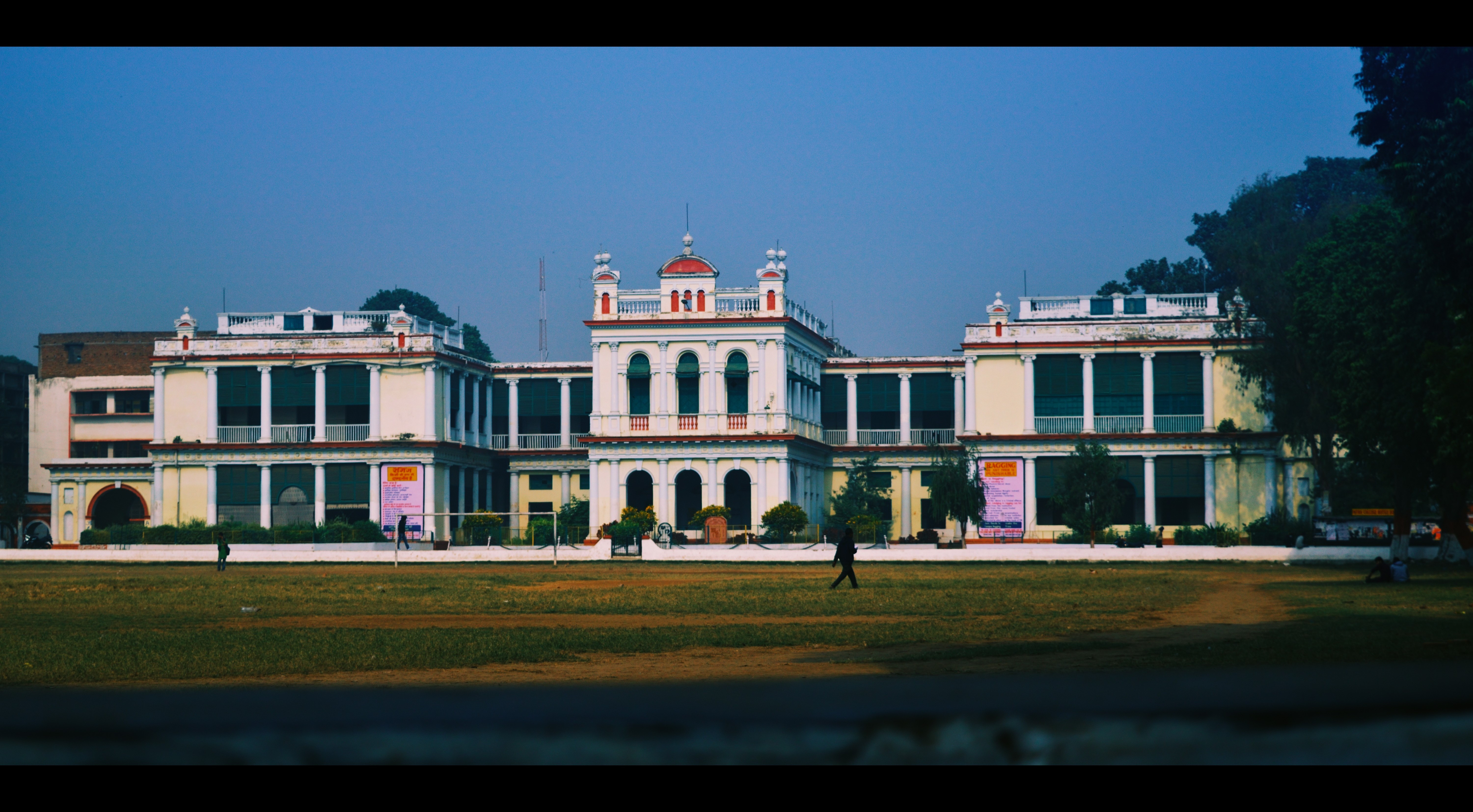
Patna College

After the split-up of old Patna University into Patna University and Bihar University on 2 January 1952, the institution saw a significant shift. Until January 1952, the college was a government college and it functioned as an independent unit, but later it became an implied college of Patna University and became responsible only for Undergraduate studies due to the shifting of the burden of Post-graduate learning on University. After the centralisation of two years of special honours-teaching, the honours of all art subjects remained in this college. Honours teaching was carried out by the nominated teachers of the Faculty of Arts from all the colleges of the university. In the first two hours, the students of Arts of Honors classes, of other colleges also used to come to study in this college.

But due to the gradual increase in the number of students, up to the end of the eighth decade, honours classes of various art courses were conducted in their respective colleges.

In 1957, all but the Geography, Sociology and Psychology post-graduate departments were shifted to Darbhanga House. However many teachers of Patna College still have been bearing the responsibility of postgraduate education by attending the departments in Darbhanga House.

There is hardly any change in post-operative activities. Maximum old councils, clubs as well as hostels are still under the Principal of the college.

On 9 September 1974, the Economics department was split from the Patna College and it took form into Vanijya Mahavidyala. Presently Vanijya Mahavidyala is in the college's yard itself.

Patna College is the first college in Bihar that celebrated the centenary ceremony in 1963 itself.

The college is also associated with E. M. Forster's novel, A Passage to India. According to Adwaita P. Ganguly, the institution known as Chandrapore College in the novel is "a replica of Patna College". Forster met Charles Russell and V. H. Jackson, who were professors of the college, in the course of writing his novel, A Passage to India. Forster had collected Hiuen Tsang's Indian Diary from Russell before he made his visit to Barabar Caves that appear as an important location in the novel. A hostel in the campus of the college is named after Jackson.

The legendary filmmaker, Satyajit Ray, used the picturesque campus of the college for his award-winning film, Seemabaddha.

== Campus and buildings ==
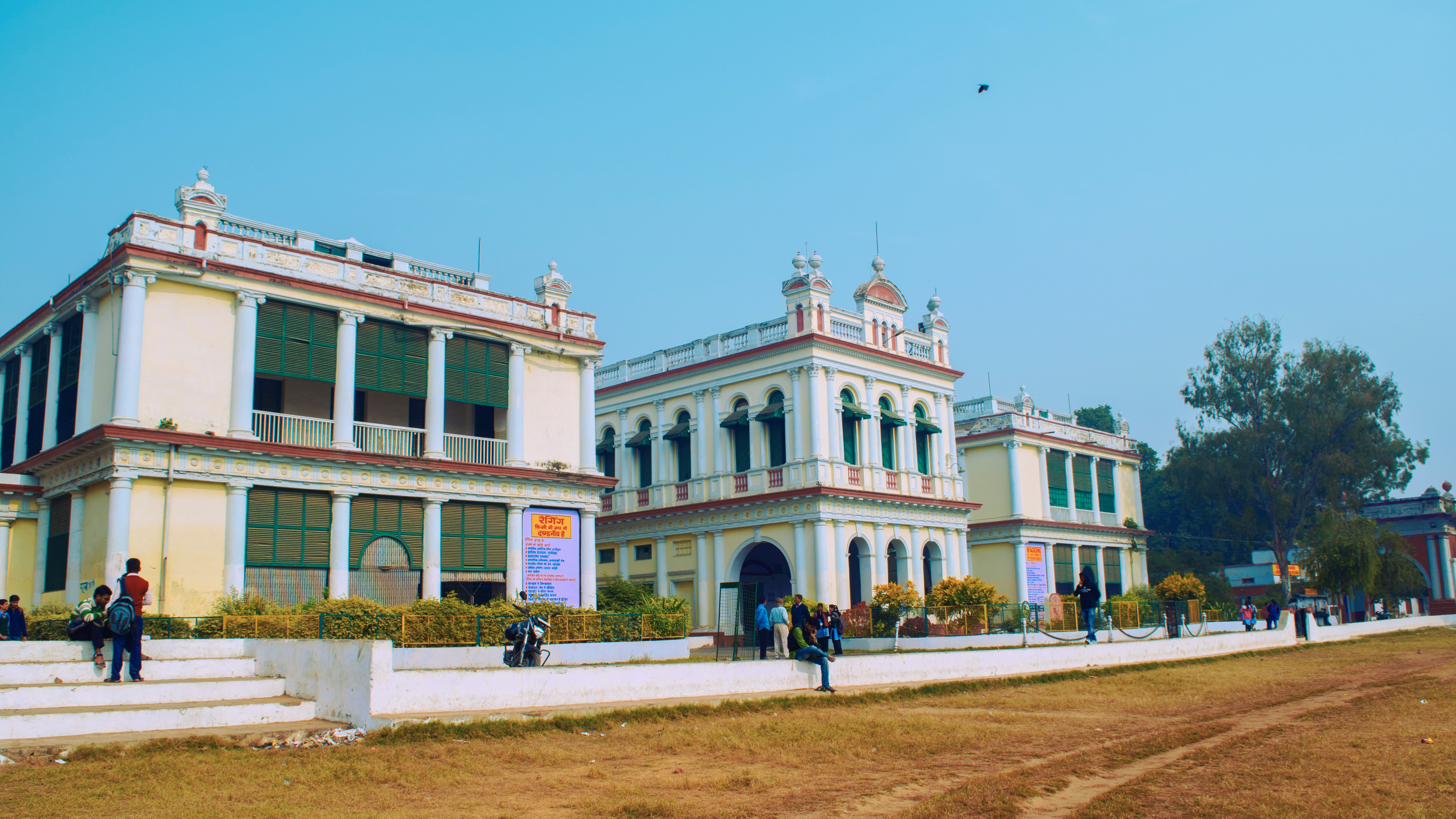
View of Patna College, Administrative Block in the middle

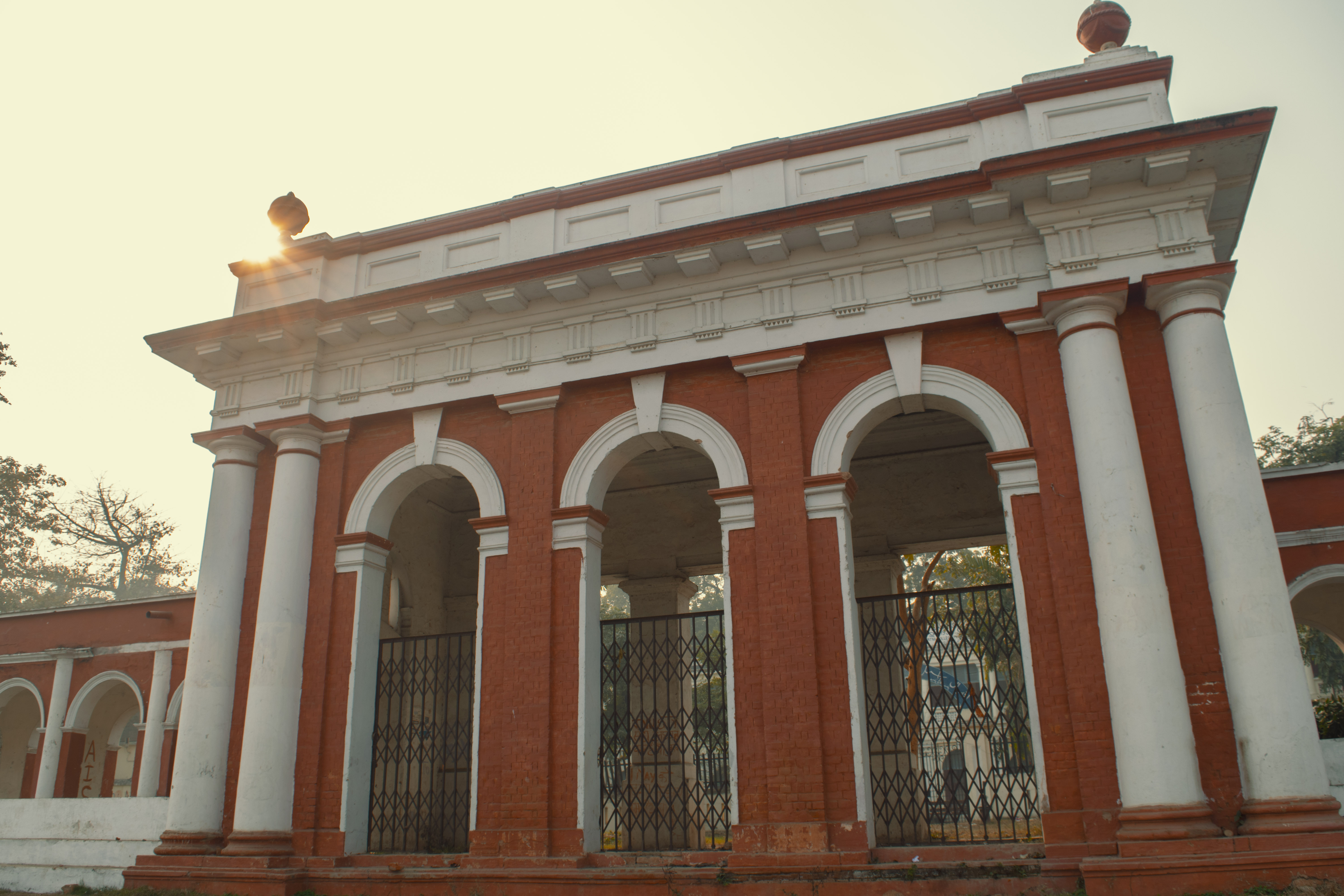
Western Corridor Gateway of Patna College

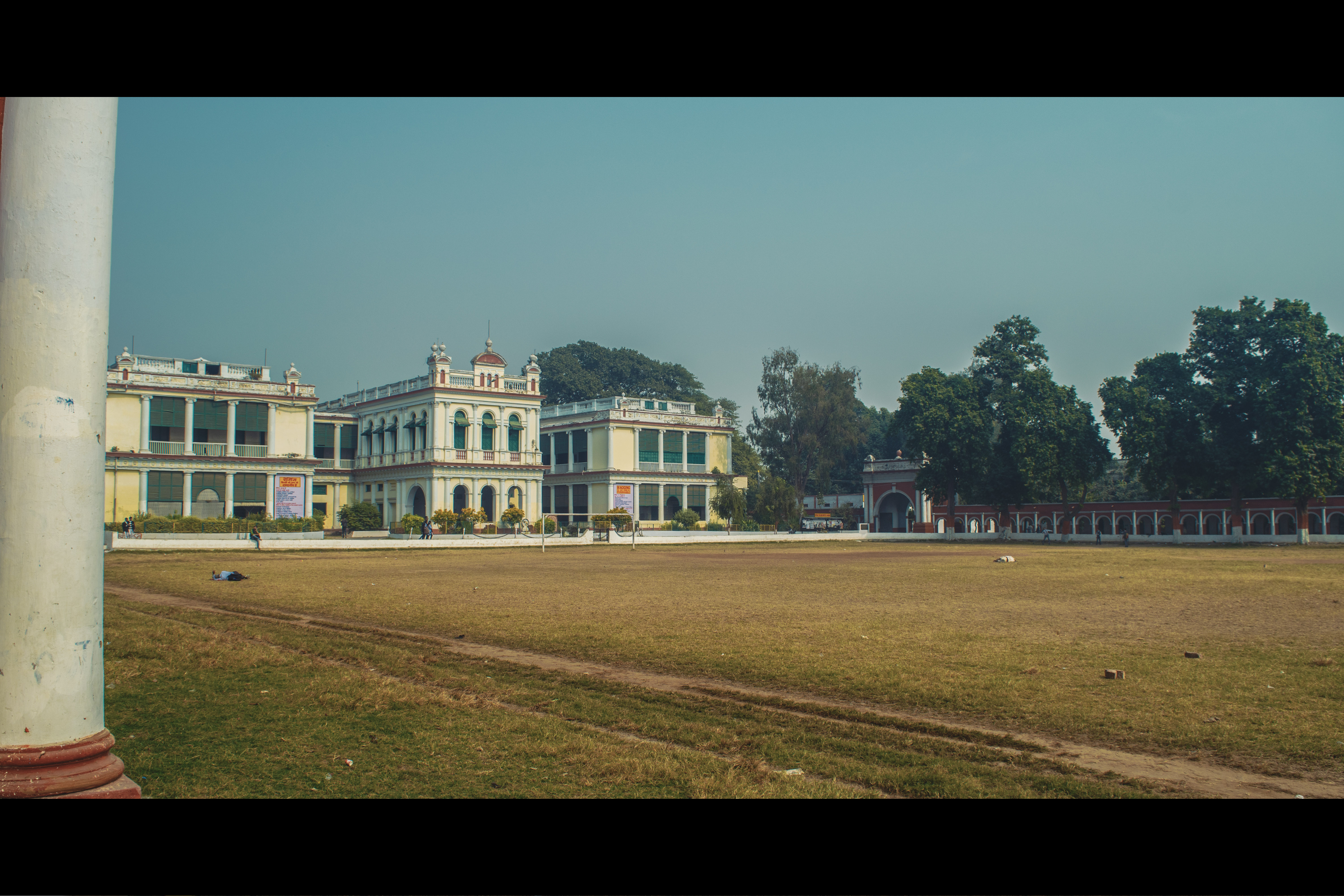
View of college from Western Corridor

The administrative block of the college is the oldest of all the buildings. It used to be the site for an opium storehouse and a Dutch factory in the 17th century, much before the college was started. Other buildings were constructed gradually over a period of time.

Some of these are the western wing (1871), the eastern (1880), the portico and the present BA lecture theatre (1882) connected with the main building by the long western corridor named after principal Ewbank. Later the hostels like Jackson, Minto, New and Iqbal and quarters for the principal and professors were constructed.

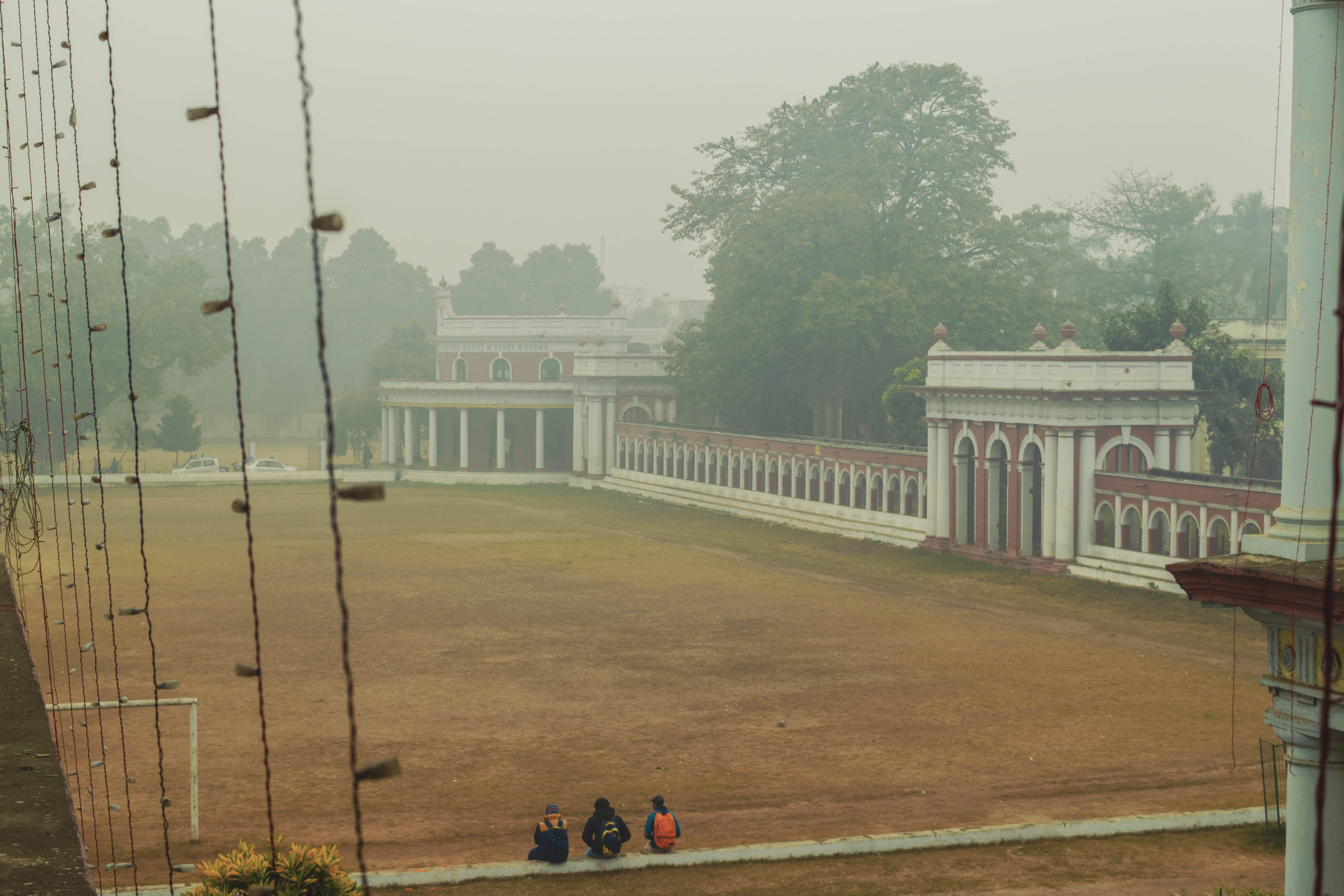
Western Corridor Patna College with the language wing in the far

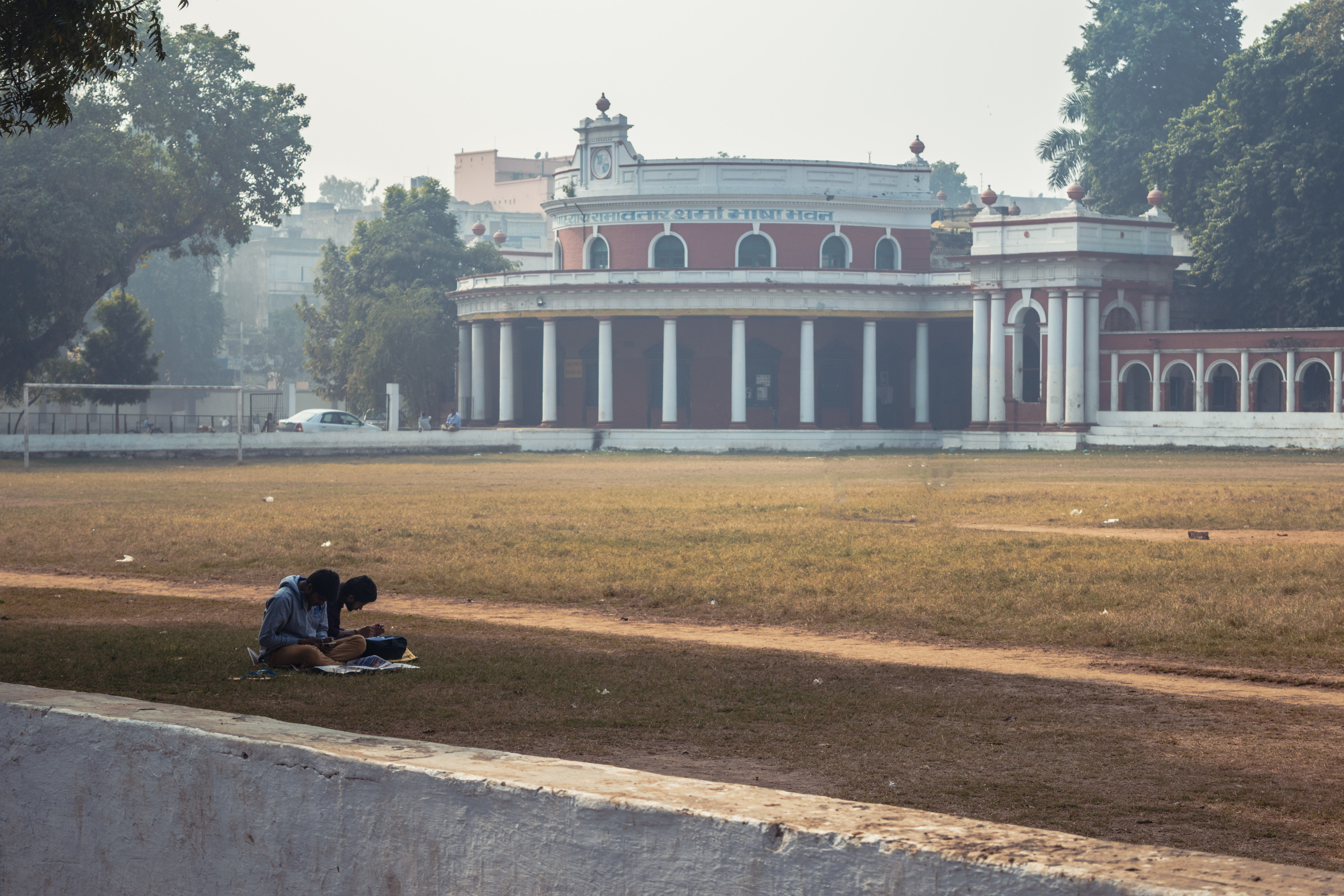
Language Wing connected with Western Corridor

The college building has been declared to be a heritage site by the Archaeological Survey of India.

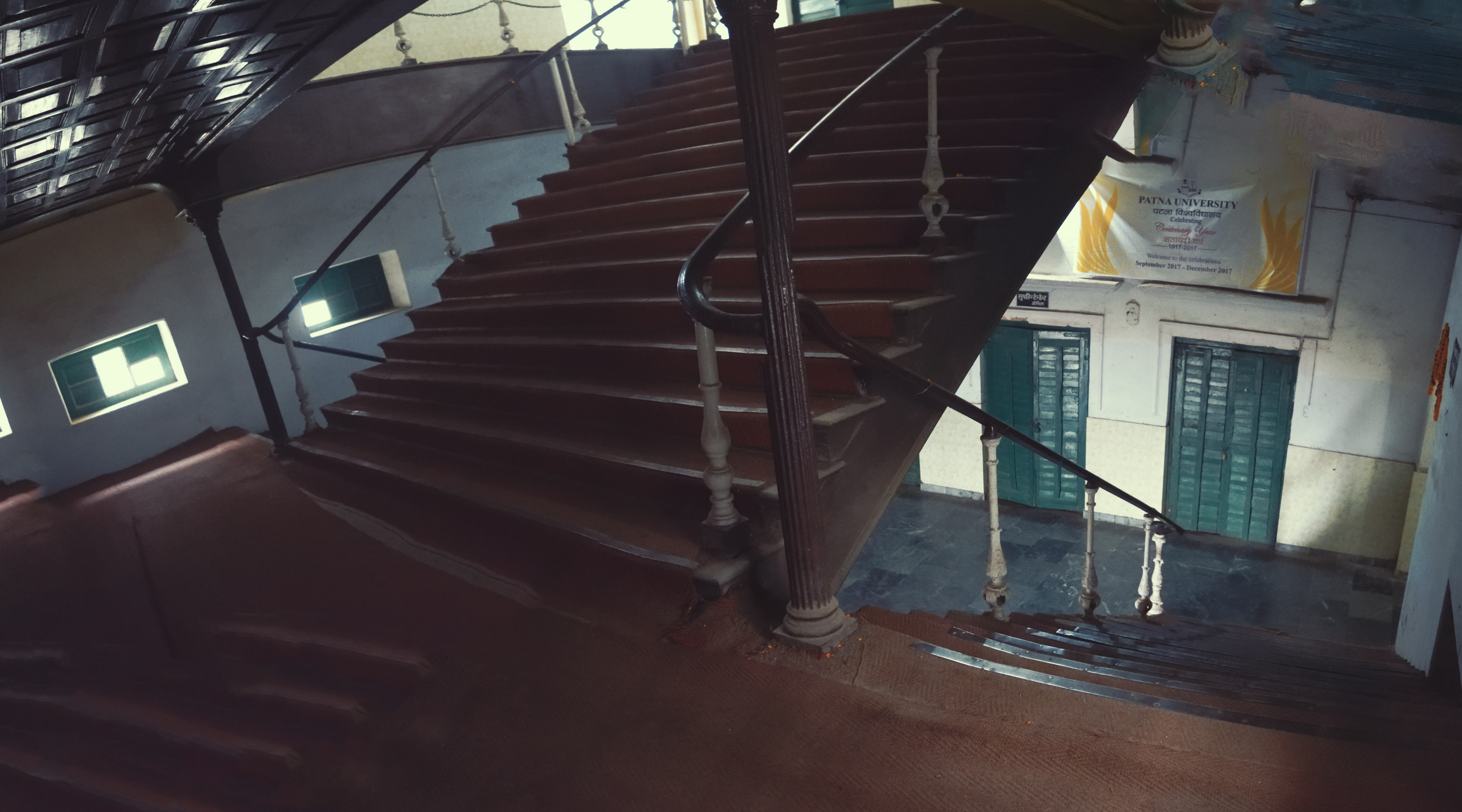
Ground Floor Stairway

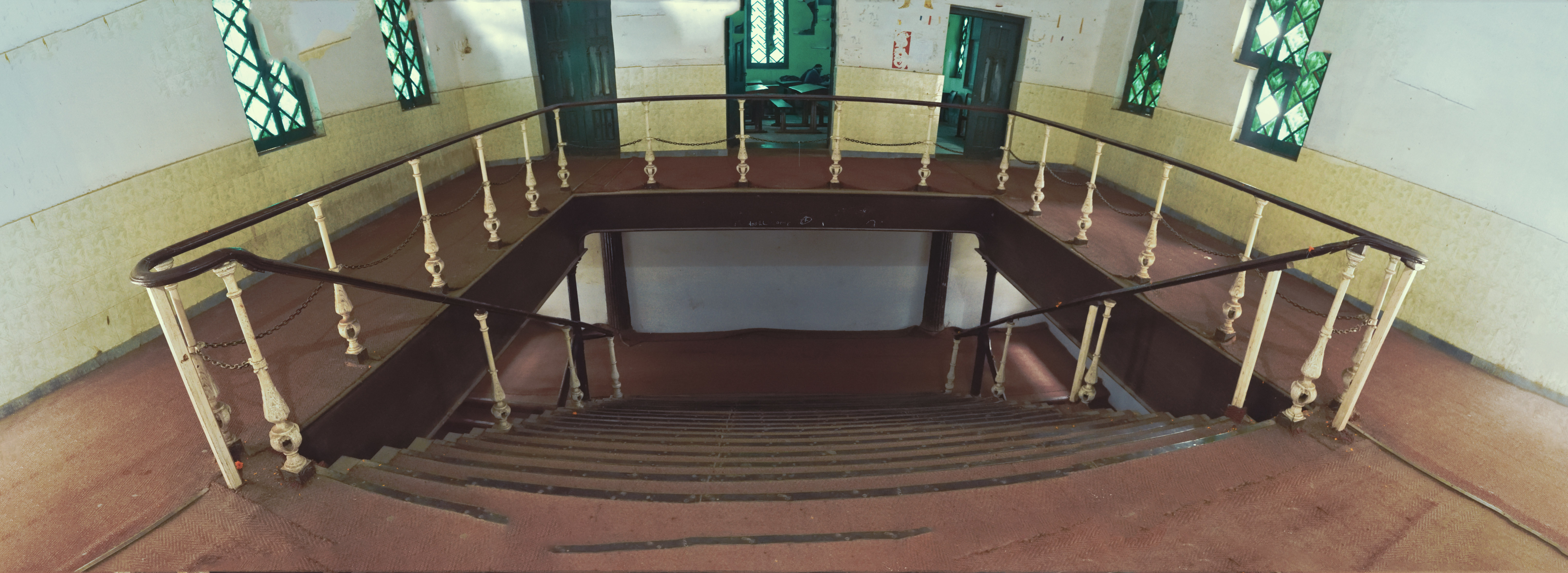
Upper Stairway

== Departments ==
=== Arts & Commerce ===
- English
- Hindi
- Urdu
- Maithili
- Bangla
- Sanskrit
- Arabic
- Farsi(Persian)
- History
- Political Science
- Economics
- Psychology
- Philosophy
- Sociology
- Geography
- Mass Communication
- Ancient Indian history and Archaeology

== 150th anniversary ==
A number of celebrations were organised during 2012 to celebrate the 150th anniversary of the college. Coinciding with the anniversary is the centenary of the Bihar Legislative Council, which held its first session in the seminar hall of Patna college in 1913 and returned there to mark the occasion on 20 January 2012.

== Notable alumni ==
- HMJ Sir Khan Bahadur Khuda bakhsh - Eminent Historian, Advocate and Former Chief Justice of Nizam's Hyderabad State, Founder of Khuda Bakhsh Oriental Library
- Ramdhari Singh Dinkar-The Hindi poet of national eminence.
- Annada Shankar Ray – Noted Bengali novelist and an early Indian ICS
- Ram Sharan Sharma – Reputed Historian, former chairman, Indian History Congress, Former Head, Dept. of History, Delhi University
- Jayaprakash Narayan- Known for his Concept of ‘Total Revolution’.
- Bidhan Chandra Roy (1897–1901) – 2nd Premier and 1st Chief Minister of West Bengal.
- Sachchidananda Sinha (1892) – One of the makers of Modern Bihar, first Chairman of Constituent Assembly of India.
- Krishna Sinha – First Chief Minister of Bihar after Independence.
- Anugrah Narayan Sinha – Regarded among foremost builders of Bihar and first Deputy Chief Minister of Bihar.
- Bhuvaneshwar Prasad Sinha – Chief Justice of Patna High Court (1943) and Chief Justice of India (1959).
- Kishore Kunal- IPS (Retd.), Ex-Vice-Chancellor, K S S University, Darbhanga.
- Ganesh Dutt(1895) – a Venerated personality of Modern Bihar
- Uday Narayan Choudhary- Speaker, Bihar Vidhan Sabha
- Mahendra Prasad- Member, Rajya Sabha
- Binod Kumar Roy, Chief Justice of three High Courts of India

== Notable faculty ==
- Ram Sharan Sharma, historian, and also an alumnus of the college.
- R. K. Sinha, English,

== Bibliography ==
- S K Sinha (1992). A Soldier Recalls. Lancer International, New Delhi. ISBN 9788170621614.
- Sujit Mukherjee (1996). Autobiography Of An Unknown Cricketer. Ravi Dayal Publisher, New Delhi. ISBN 9788175300019.
- Justice Harihar Mahapatra (2011). My Life, My Work. Allied Publishers Private Limited. ISBN 9788184246407.
- Sudhir Kumar Jha (2005). A new dawn: Patna reincarnated. Sudhir Kumar Jha. ISBN 978-81-7525-621-7.
- Shreedhar Narayan Pandey (1975). Education and social changes in Bihar, 1900–1921: a survey of social history of Bihar from Lord Curzon to noncooperation movement. Motilal Banarsidass. ISBN 978-0-8426-0986-9.
