= Vanijya Mahavidyala =

College in Bihar, India

Vanijya Mahavidyalaya
- Type: Undergraduate and Postgraduate College
- Established: 1953
- Affiliations: Patna University
- Chancellor: Shri Fagu Chauhan
- Vice-Chancellor: Prof. Ajay kumar Singh
- Location: Patna, Bihar, India
- Website: Vanijya Mahavidyalaya

Vanijya Mahavidyalaya, established in 1953, is a commerce college in Patna, Bihar. It is affiliated to Patna University, and offers undergraduate and postgraduate courses in commerce. It also offers a bachelor of business administration course.

== Accreditation ==
Vanijya Mahavidyalaya was awarded A++ grade by the National Assessment and Accreditation Council (NAAC).
