= Sanskriti Museum & Art Gallery =

Museum in Hazaribagh, India

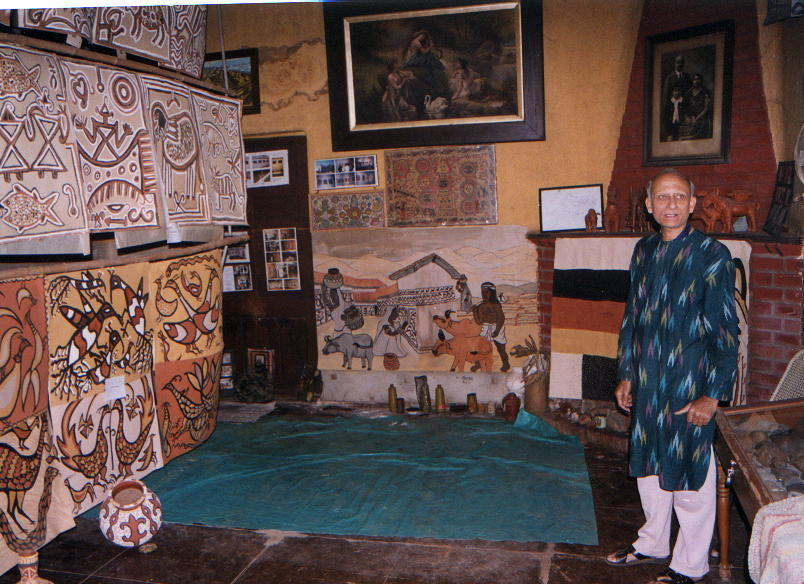
- Established: 1991
- Location: Sanskriti Centre, Hazaribagh
- Coordinates: 24.009°N 85.378°E
- Type: Archaeology, Anthropology, and Tribal Art
- Director: Bulu Imam
- Website: Official website

Sanskriti Museum & Art Gallery, Hazaribagh was founded by Bulu Imam in 1991, after he discovered the first rockart of Hazaribagh district at Isco, subsequently bringing to light over dozen meso-chalcolithic rockarts, including the prehistoric archaeology of the North Karanpura Valley in Jharkhand.

The Sanskriti museum displays a comprehensive collection of Palaeolithic to Neolithic stone tools, microliths, and bronze to Iron Age artifacts, including potteries and Buddhist antiquities from around the Hazaribagh region. It also has an ethnological gallery dedicated to the Birhors, Santhals, and Oraons along with monographs compiled on their Life, Folklore, Songs, Ethnobotany, available in the museum research archives, and library. It also has a gallery of local crafts and textile, and an art gallery over about 200 Khovar (marriage art) and Sohrai (harvest art) paintings of Hazaribagh exhibited and displayed.

The museum is presently housed in his private building which used to be the Tea Garden District labour Association building in the early 20th century (1919), in a 3 acres campus with a grove of trees.

The Sanskriti museum has a small library and a research archive, along with photographic and visual documentations to back up the exhibits in the museum. The library has several published papers, books, magazines and newsletters related to the Museum and Art Gallery in its Resource Archives and Library.

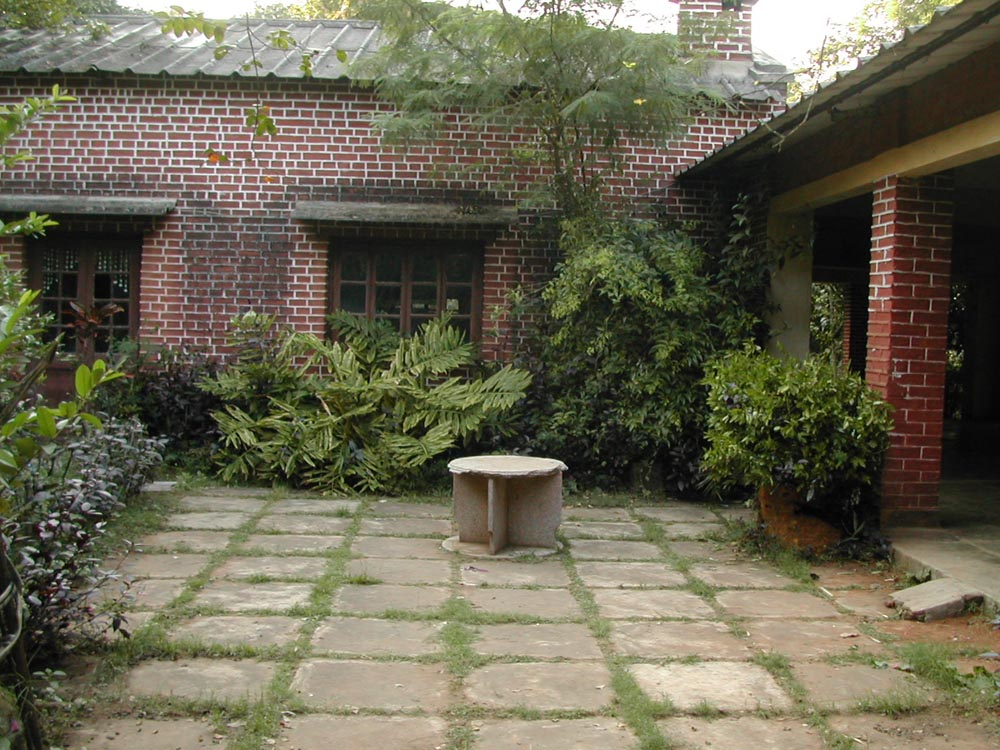
Sanskriti Museum Building

== Museum Collections ==
The museum has three major galleries- Archaeological Gallery, Ethnological Gallery, and Tribal Art & Crafts Gallery.

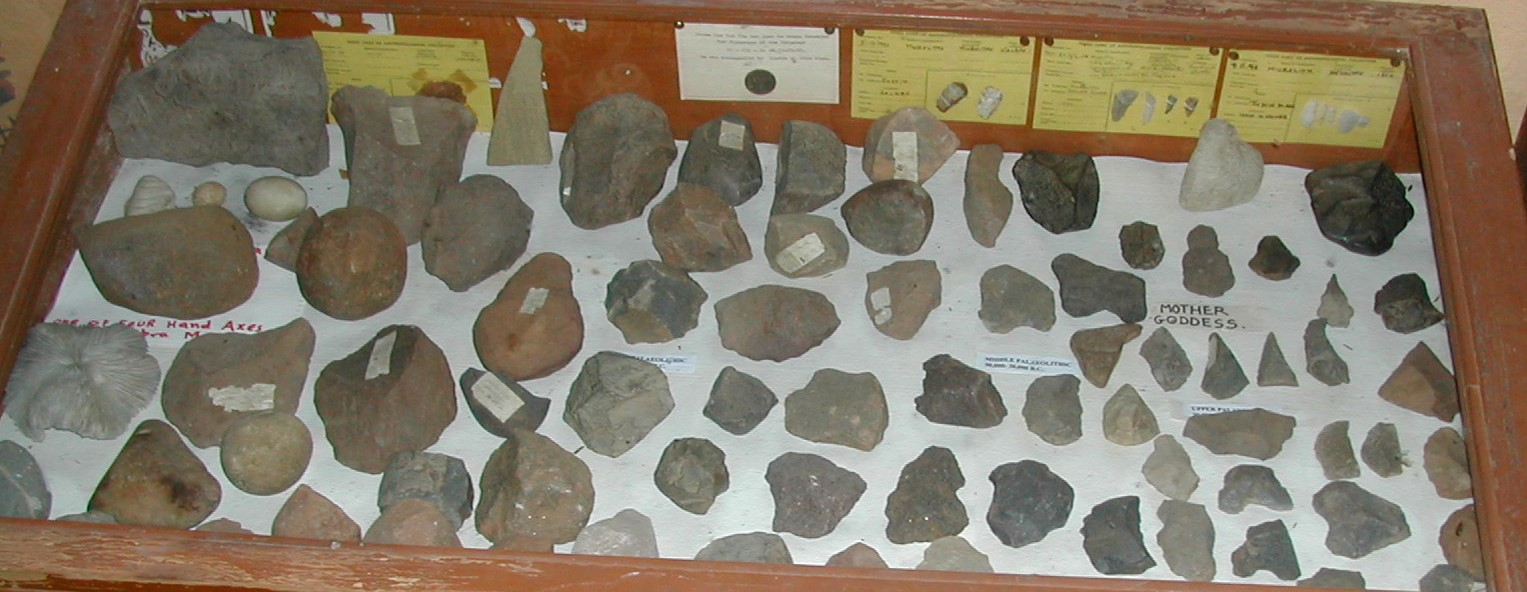
Prehistoric Stonetools Cabinet-1

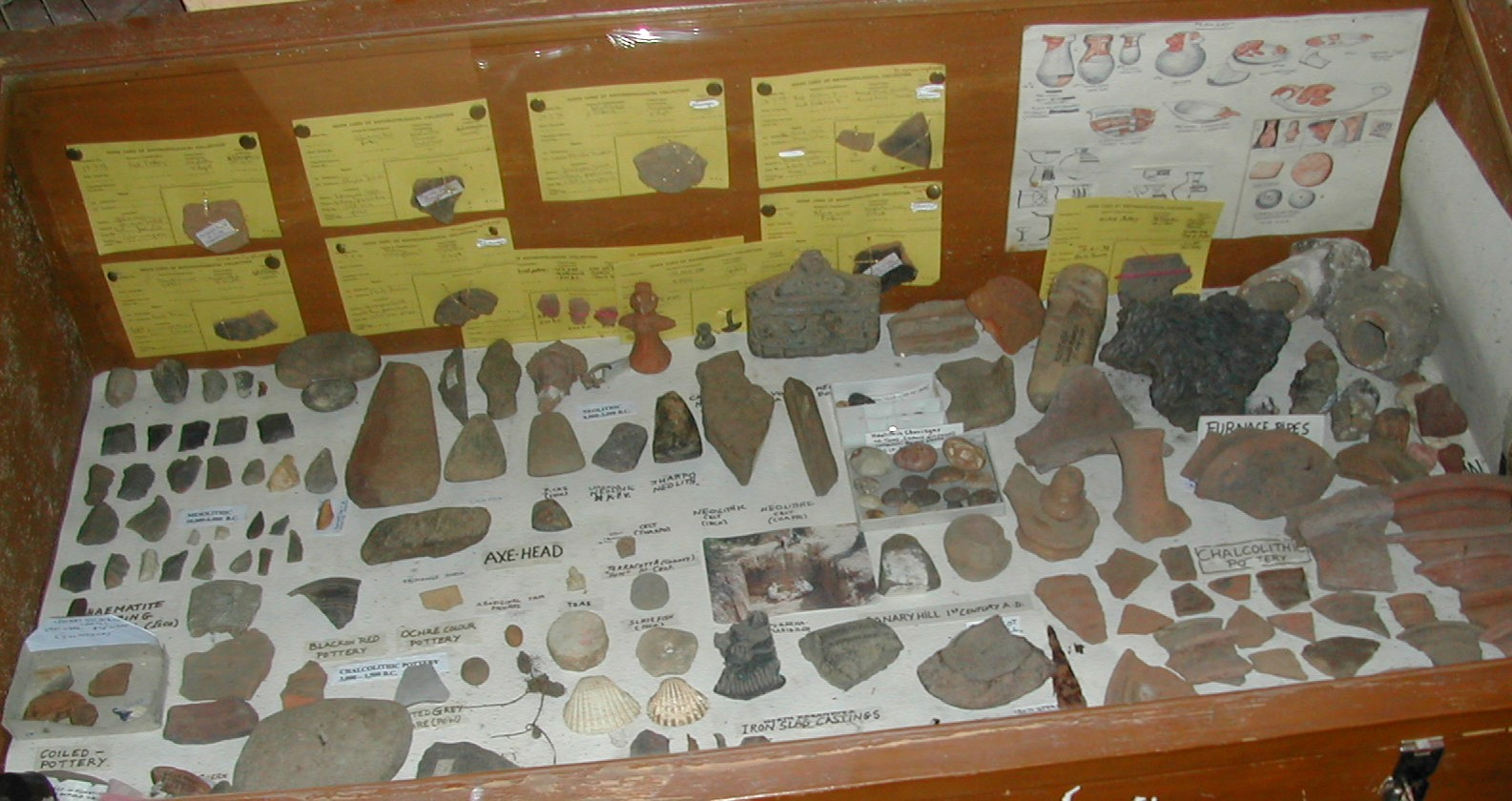
Chalcolithic Pottery and Iron Age Cabinet-2

== Archaeological Gallery ==
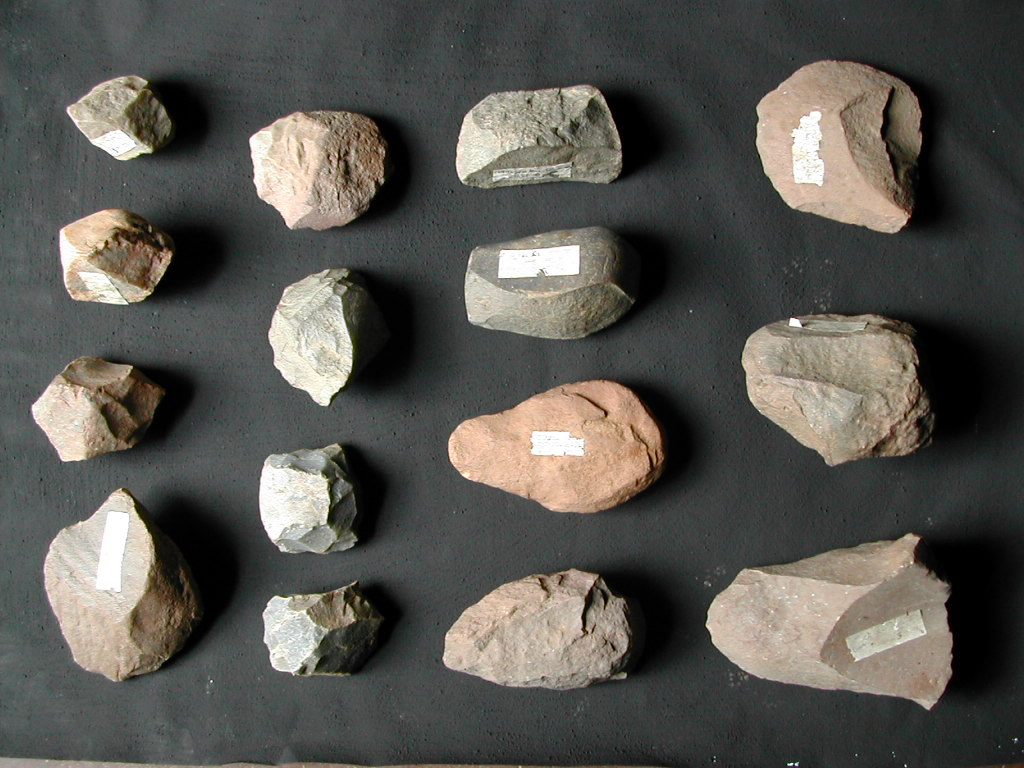
Lower Palaeolithic stonetools

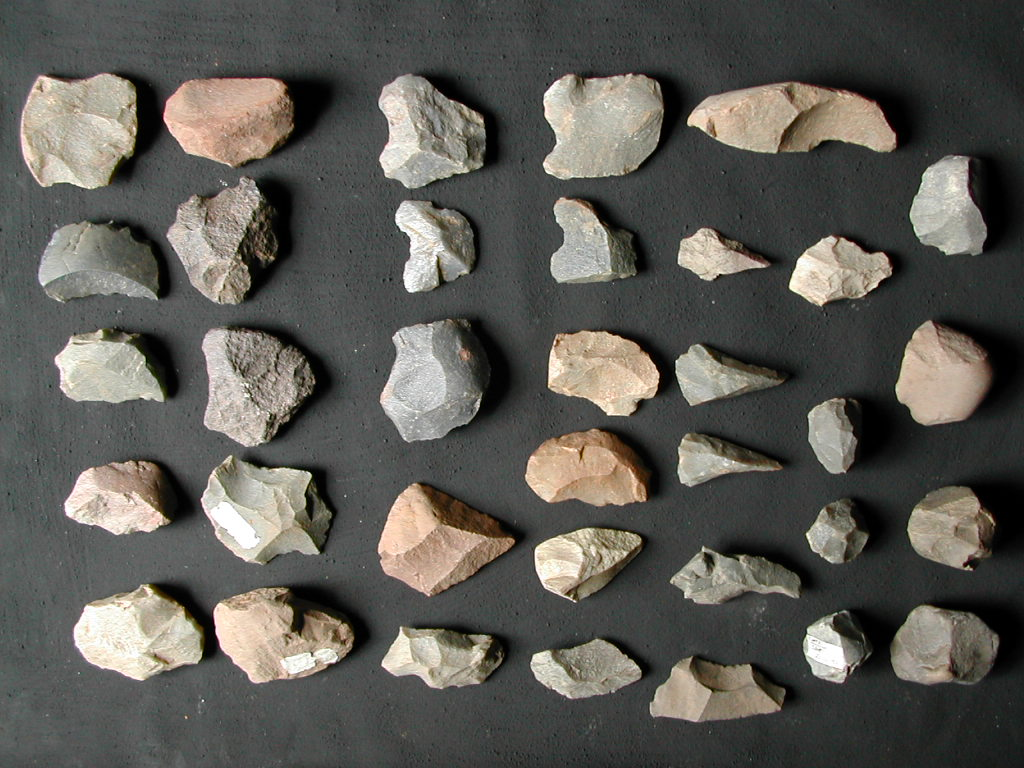
Middle Palaeolithic stonetools

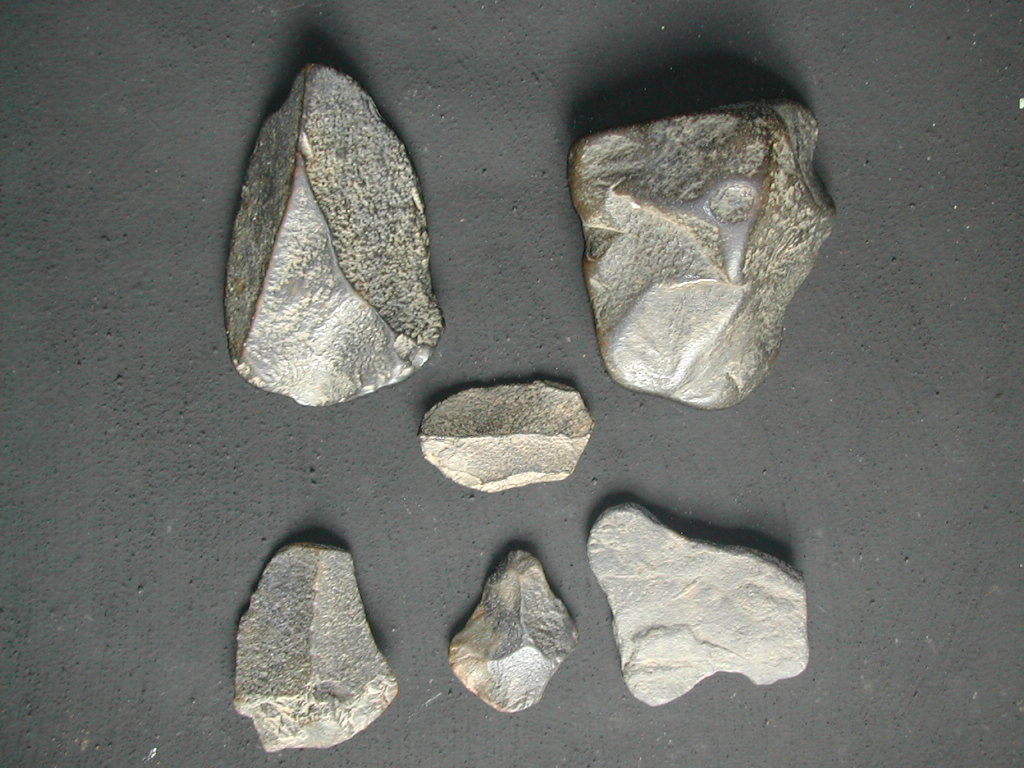
Upper Palaeolithic stonetools

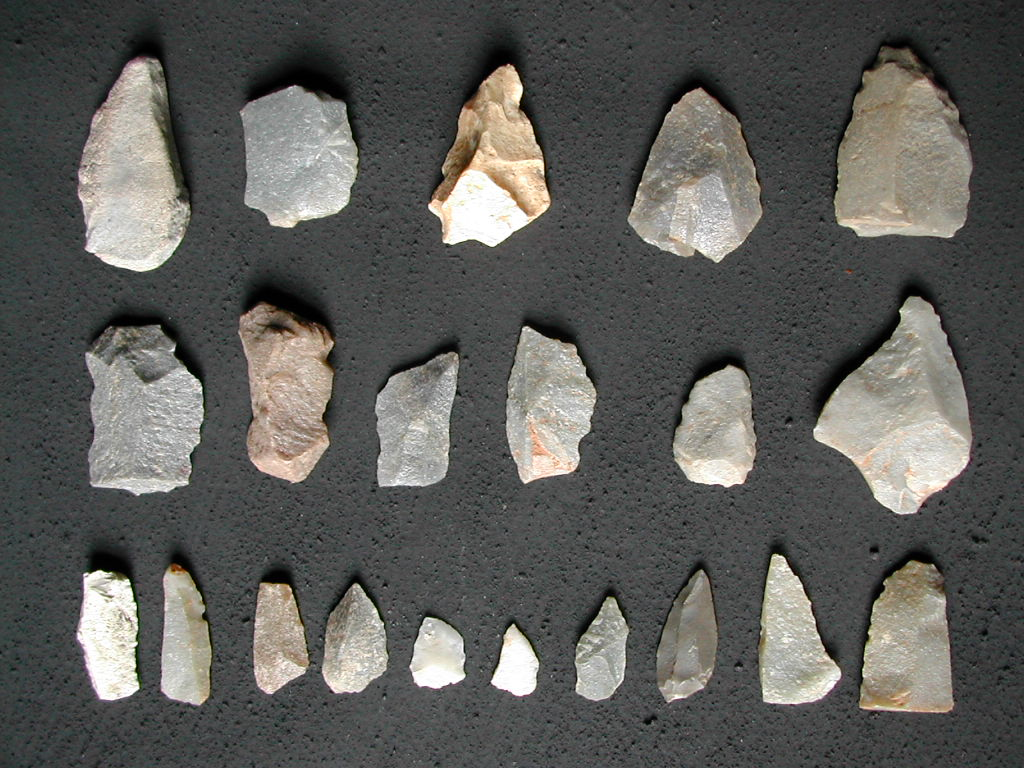
Mesolithic tools and Microliths

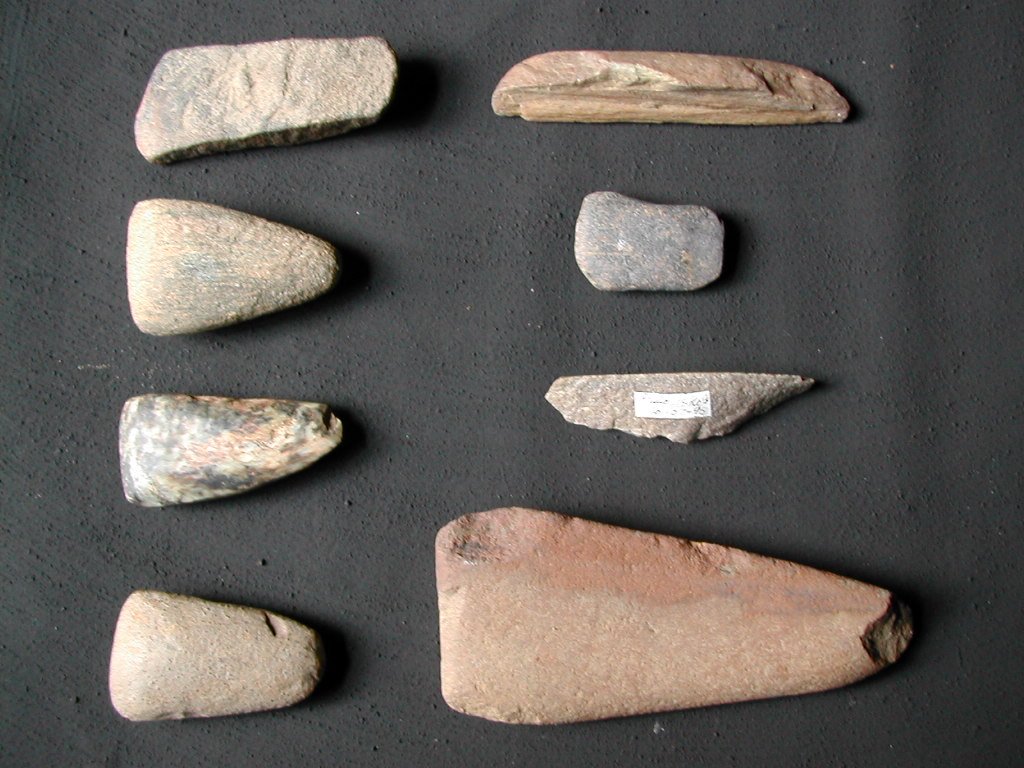
Neolithic celts

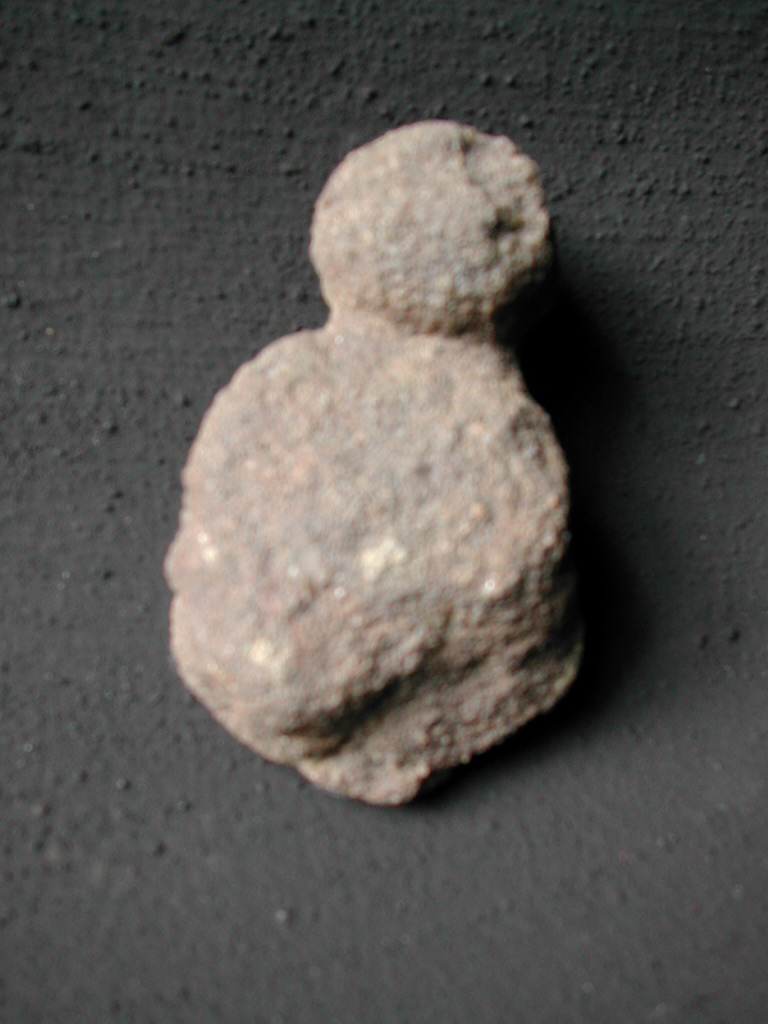
Mother Goddess Statue

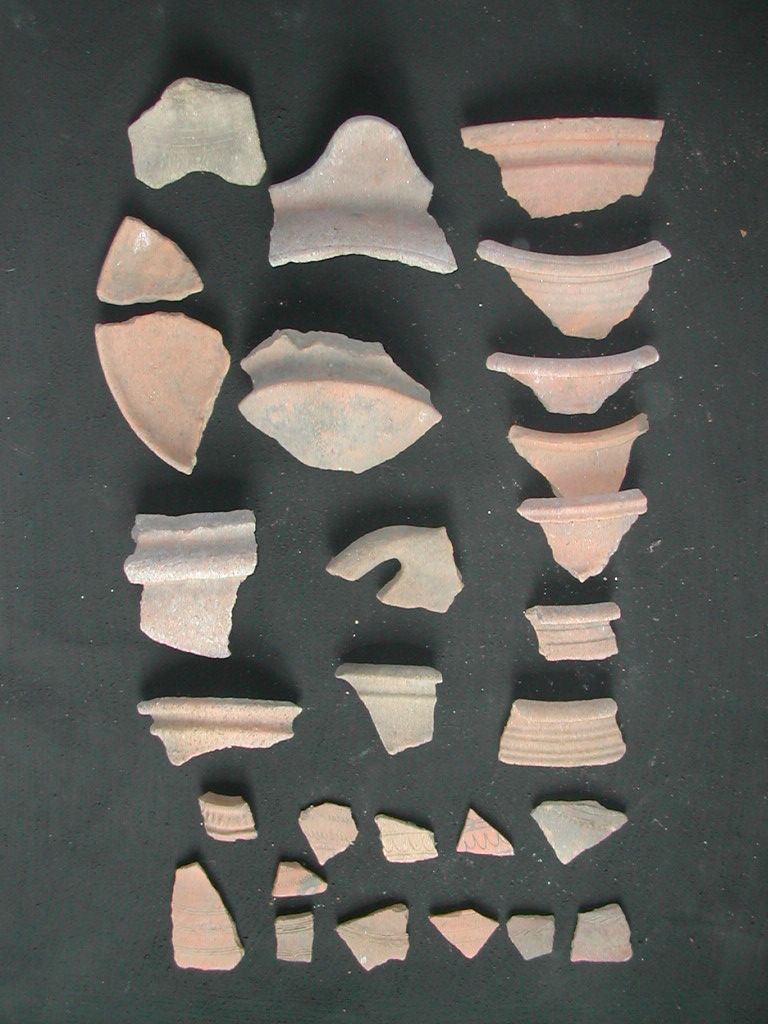
Chalcolithic pottery from Hazaribagh

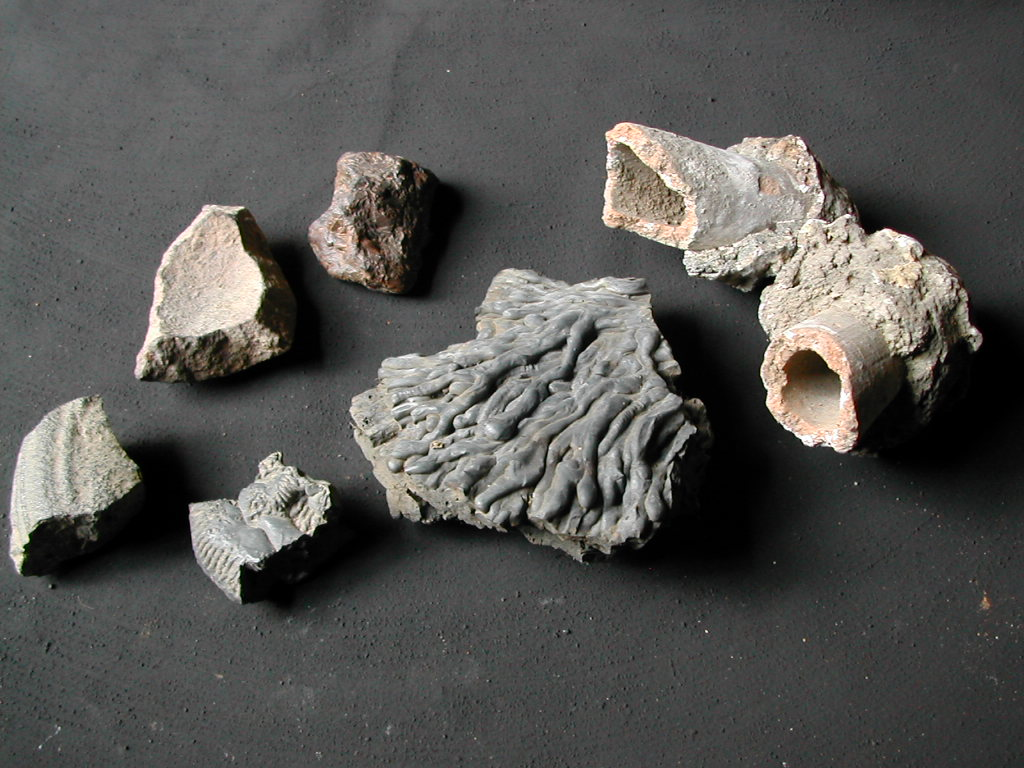
Iron-age furnace pipe & iron-slag castings from Isco

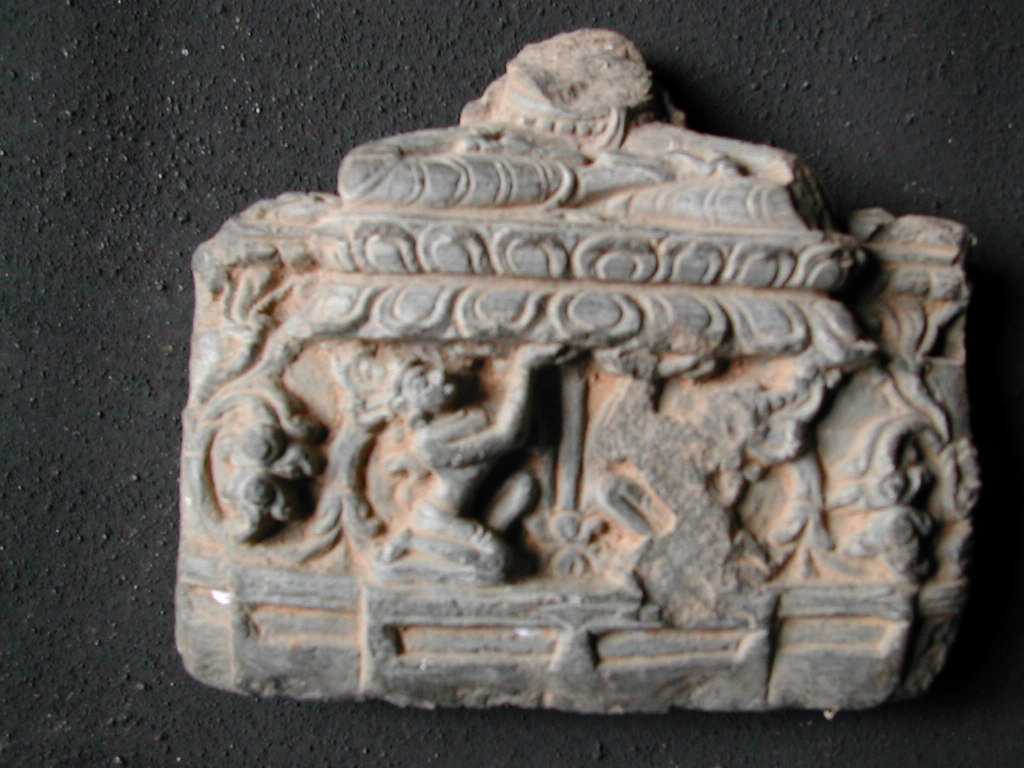
Buddhist sculpture from Canary hill

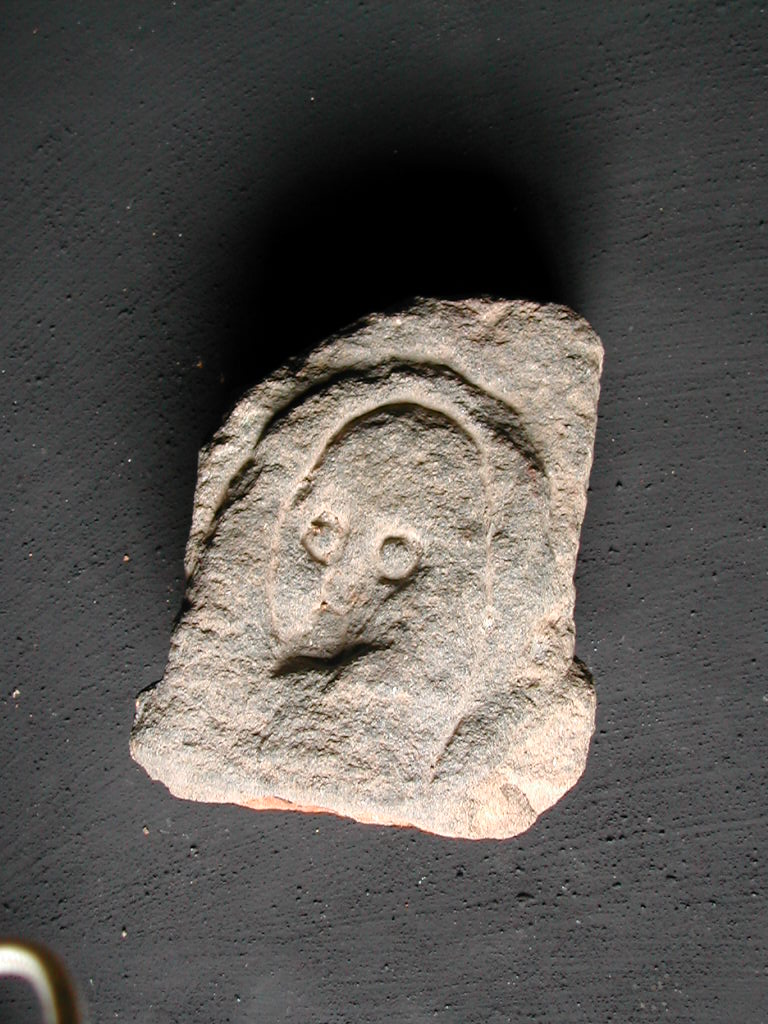
Chandi-Bonga deity on stone from Dipugarha

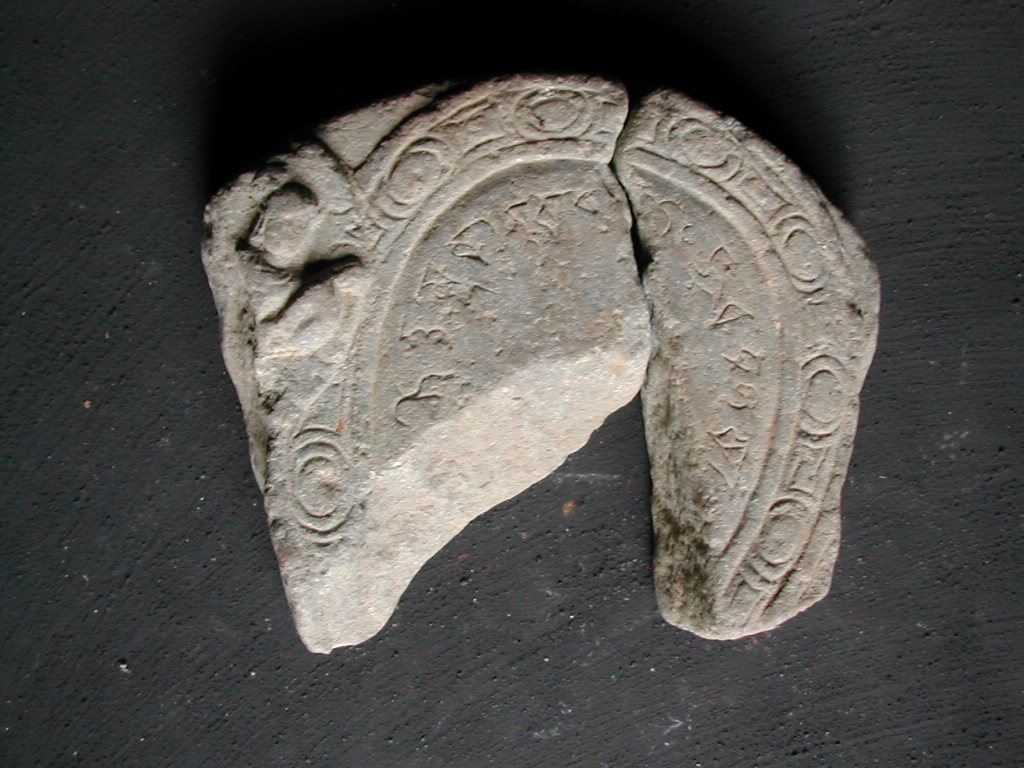
Pala inscription from Dato, Hazaribagh

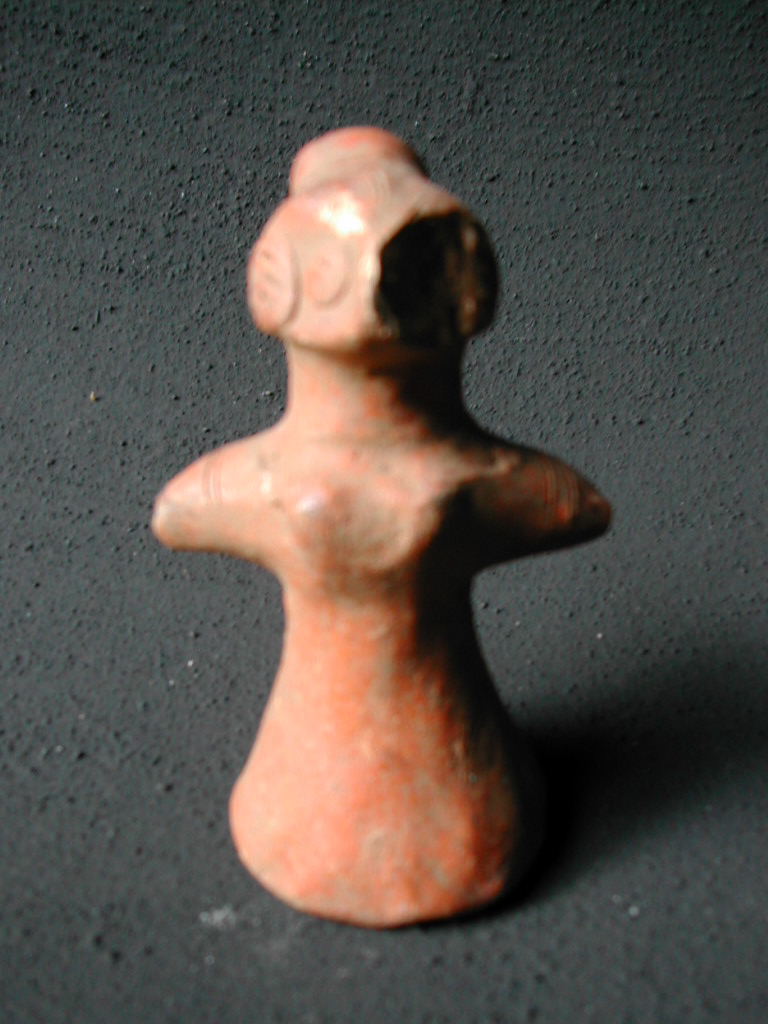
Terracotta Bird-woman Dipugarha

== Ethnological Gallery ==
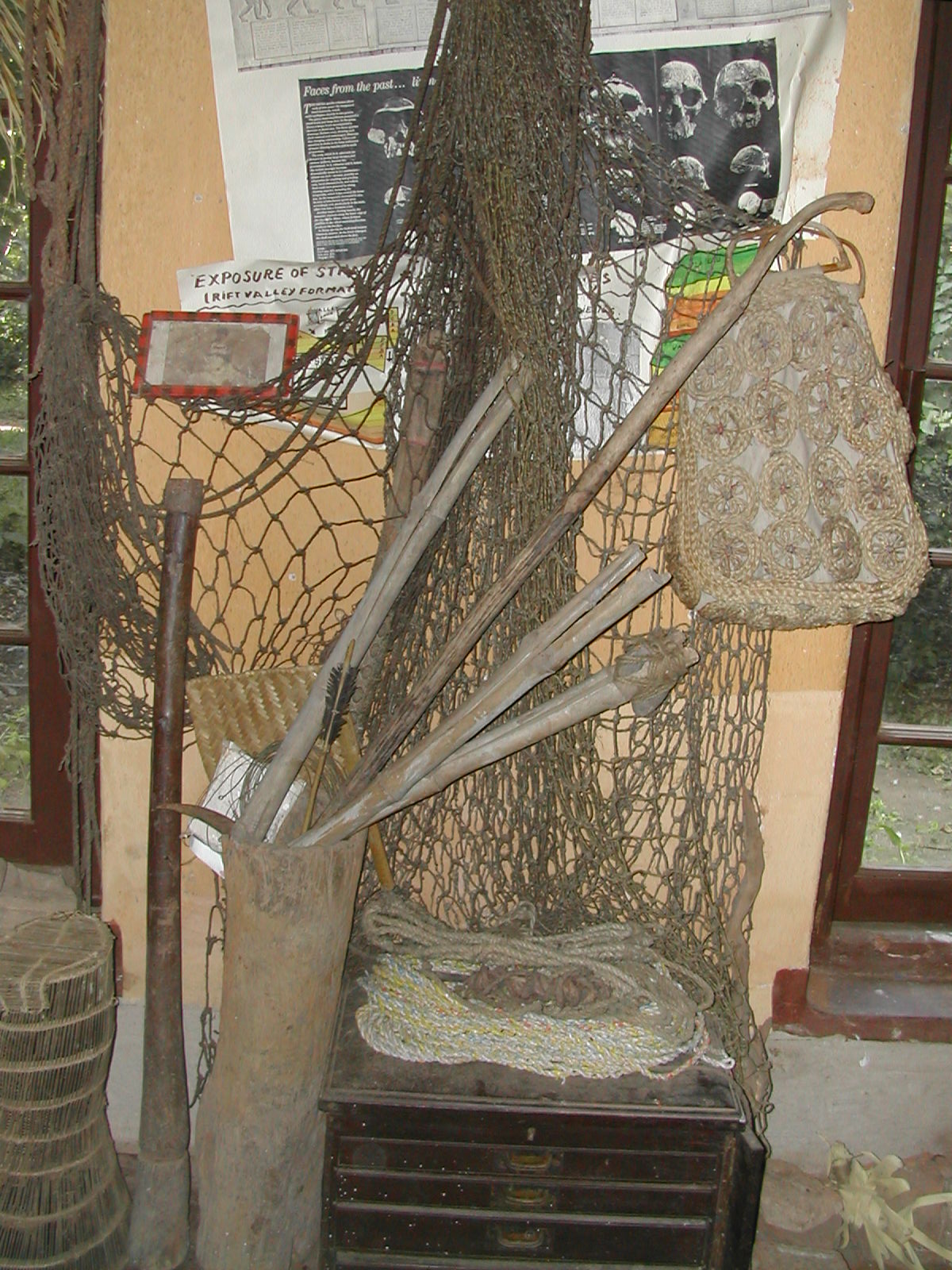
Birhor Nets and traps from Hazaribagh

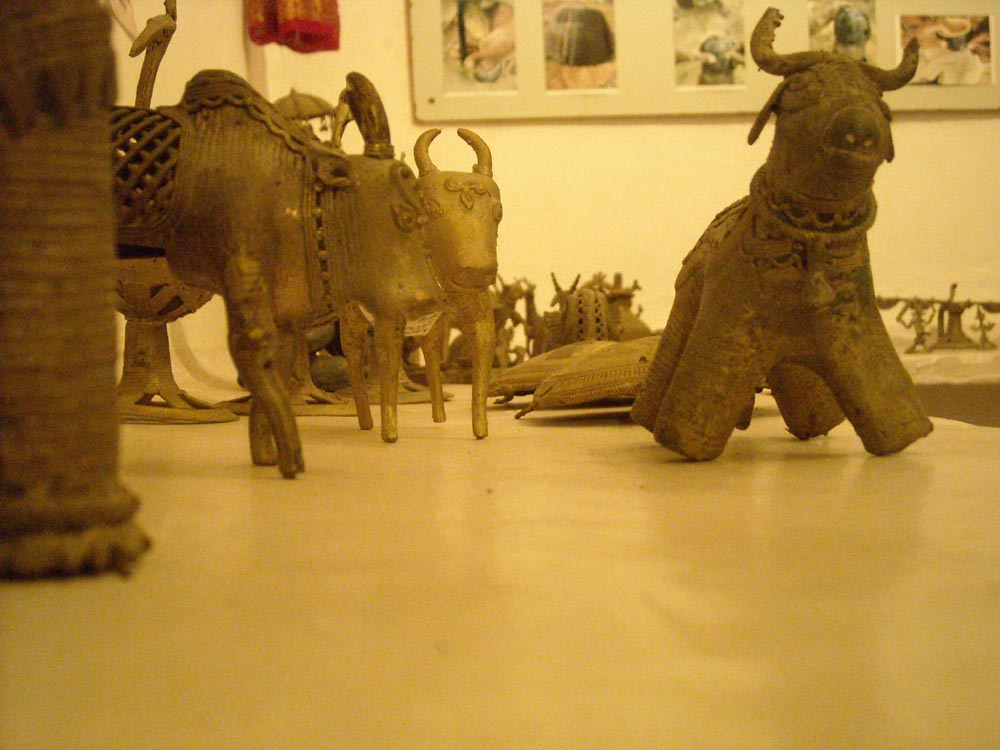
Malhar metal castings from Hazaribagh

== Tribal Art & Crafts Gallery ==
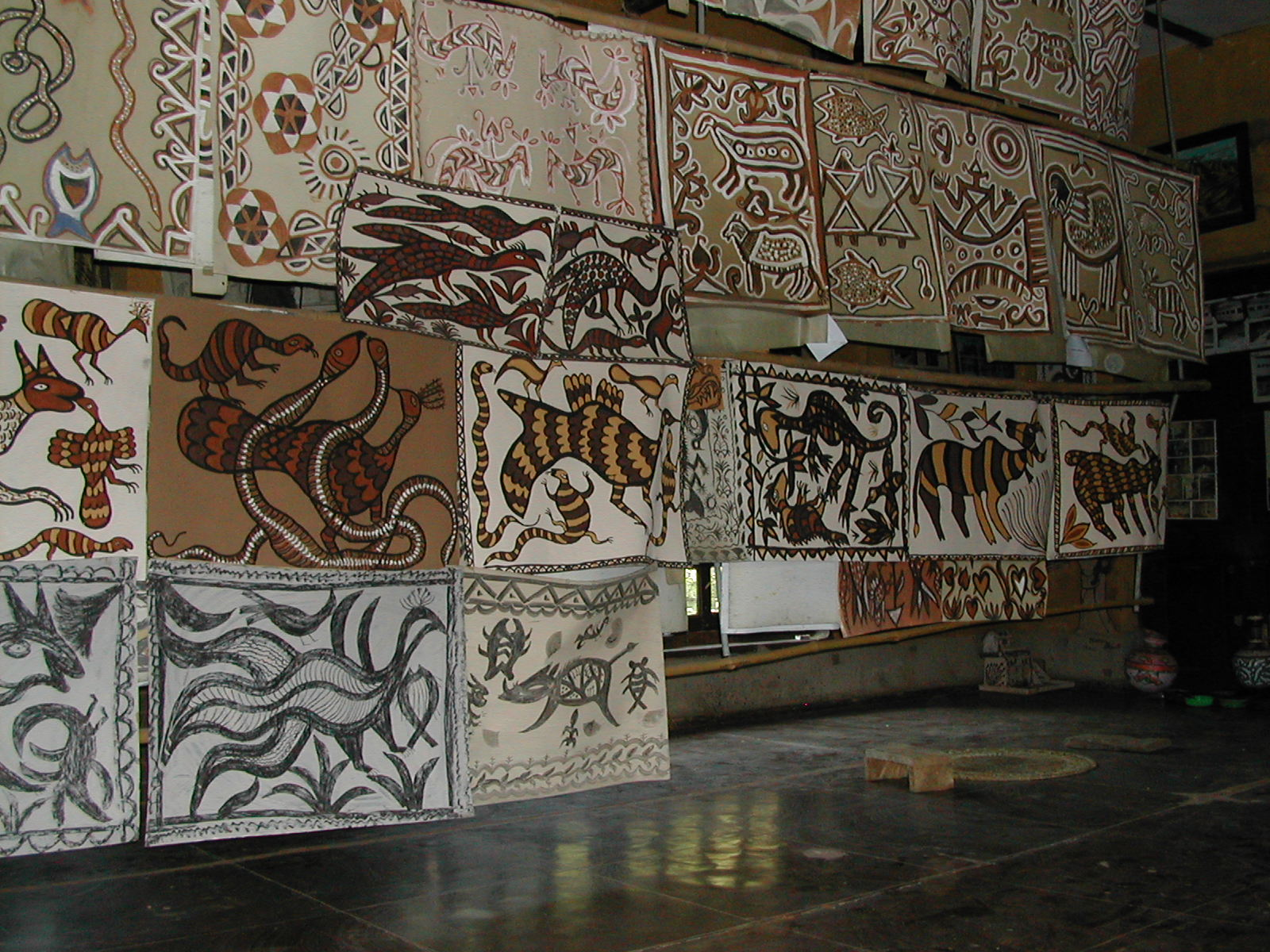
Khovar and Sohrai Paintings

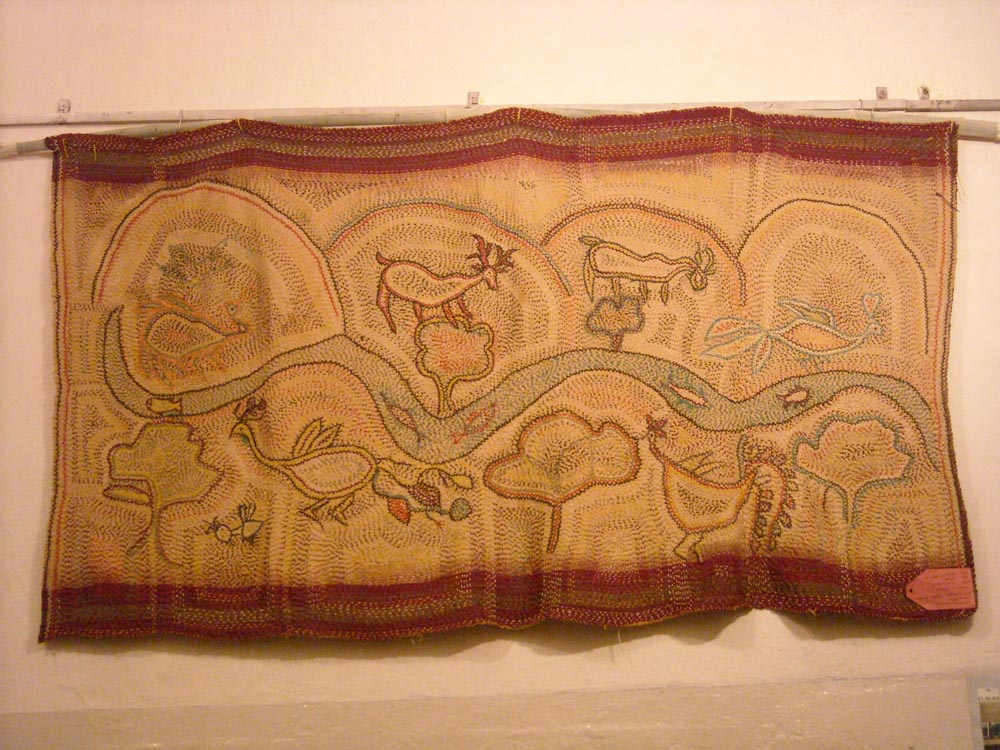
Embroidered Quilts or Ledras
