= Balkhi =

Balkhi (Persian: بلخی, "from/ of Balkh," a city in modern-day Afghanistan) may refer to:

People:

- Abu Ma'shar al-Balkhi (787–886), Afghan astrologer, astronomer and Islamic philosopher
- Abu-Shakur Balkhi (915–?), Persian poet
- Abu Zayd al-Balkhi (850–934), Persian geographer, mathematician, physician, psychologist and scientist
- Fasihuddin Balkhi, Indian author and historian
- Hiwi al-Balkhi, 9th century exegete and Biblical critic
- Ismael Balkhi (1918–1968), Afghan political activist and Hazara reformist leader
- Jalal ad-Din Muhammad Balkhi (1207–1273), better known in the English-speaking world as Rumi, Persian Muslim poet, jurist, theologian and Sufi mystic
- Muzaffar Balkhi (1320–1400), Indian Sufi saint
- Rabia Balkhi, possibly first female New Persian poet believed to have lived in the 10th century
- Ibn Balkhi, a conventional name for a 12th-century Iranian historian and author of the Persian book Fārs-Nāma
- Sediqa Balkhi, Afghan politician
- Sultan Balkhi, 14th-century Muslim preacher based in Bengal

== See also ==
- Balkh, Afghanistan
- Balki (disambiguation)
