= Alma Latif Shamsi =

Indian poet, writer and historian

- Born: Latif Shamsi; May 21, 1936; Rashtrapati Bhawan, Delhi
- Died: January 8, 2025 (aged 88); Kako, Bihar
- Resting place: Kako, Bihar
- Education: Aligarh Muslim University; Jamia Millia Islamia
- Occupations: Writer, Historian, Poet, Activist
- Notable work: Aligarh Muslim University Aur Meri Dastaan-e-Hayaat (2022); Kako Ki Kahani Alma Ki Zubani (2022)
- Political party: Indian National Congress; Socialist Party of India; Bharatiya Janata Party
- Movement: Bihar Movement

Alma Latif Shamsi (21 May 1936 – 8 January 2025) was an Indian poet, writer, historian and political activist from Bihar. He is the author of Aligarh Muslim University Aur Meri Dastaan-e-Hayaat, an autobiography and Kako Ki Kahani Alma Ki Zubani, a book on the oral and traditional history of Kako, Bihar. He had been associated with the Indian National Congress, Socialist Party and Bharatiya Janata Party and played a role in Bihar Movement, led by Jayprakash Narayan.

== Early life and education ==
Alma Latif Shamsi was born as Latif Shamsi to A. D. Shamsi, the private secretary of Viceroy on 21 May 1936 at the Rashtrapati Bhawan, Delhi. He was parented under the tutelage of Dr. Zakir Husain.

He had completed his education from Aligarh Muslim University and Jamia Millia Islamia.

== Literary works ==
- Shamsi, Alma Latif (2022). Muin, Kahkashan; Tanwir, Afshan (eds.). Aligarh Muslim University Aur Meri Dastaan-e-Hayaat (in Urdu) (1st ed.). Delhi: Educational Publishing House. ISBN 9789394616578.
- Shamsi, Alma Latif (2022). Kako Ki Kahani Alma Ki Zubani (in Urdu) (1st ed.). Delhi: Educational Publishing House. ISBN 9789393785893.

== Awards ==
- Lifetime Achievement Award by Urdu Koshang, Jehanabad Zila Prashasan.

== Death ==
Alma Latif Shamsi died on 8 January 2025 at his residence in Kako, Bihar. His death was condoled by Nitish Kumar, the chief minister of Bihar, Arif Mohammad Khan, the Governor of Bihar and Tejashwi Yadav, leader of opposition in Bihar. Khan and Yadav visited the residence of Shamsi, also prayed for him.
