= Rabi'a =

Rabi`a may refer to:

- Rabi`ah, an Arab tribe

Rābiʻa (رابعه) may refer to:

- Rabia al-Adawiyya, 8th-century Muslim Sufi saint
- Rabi'a Balkhi, Persian poet
