= Solomon in Islam =

Islamic view of Solomon

Prophet Sulaymān Alayhi as-Salam
- سُلَيْمَان; Solomon
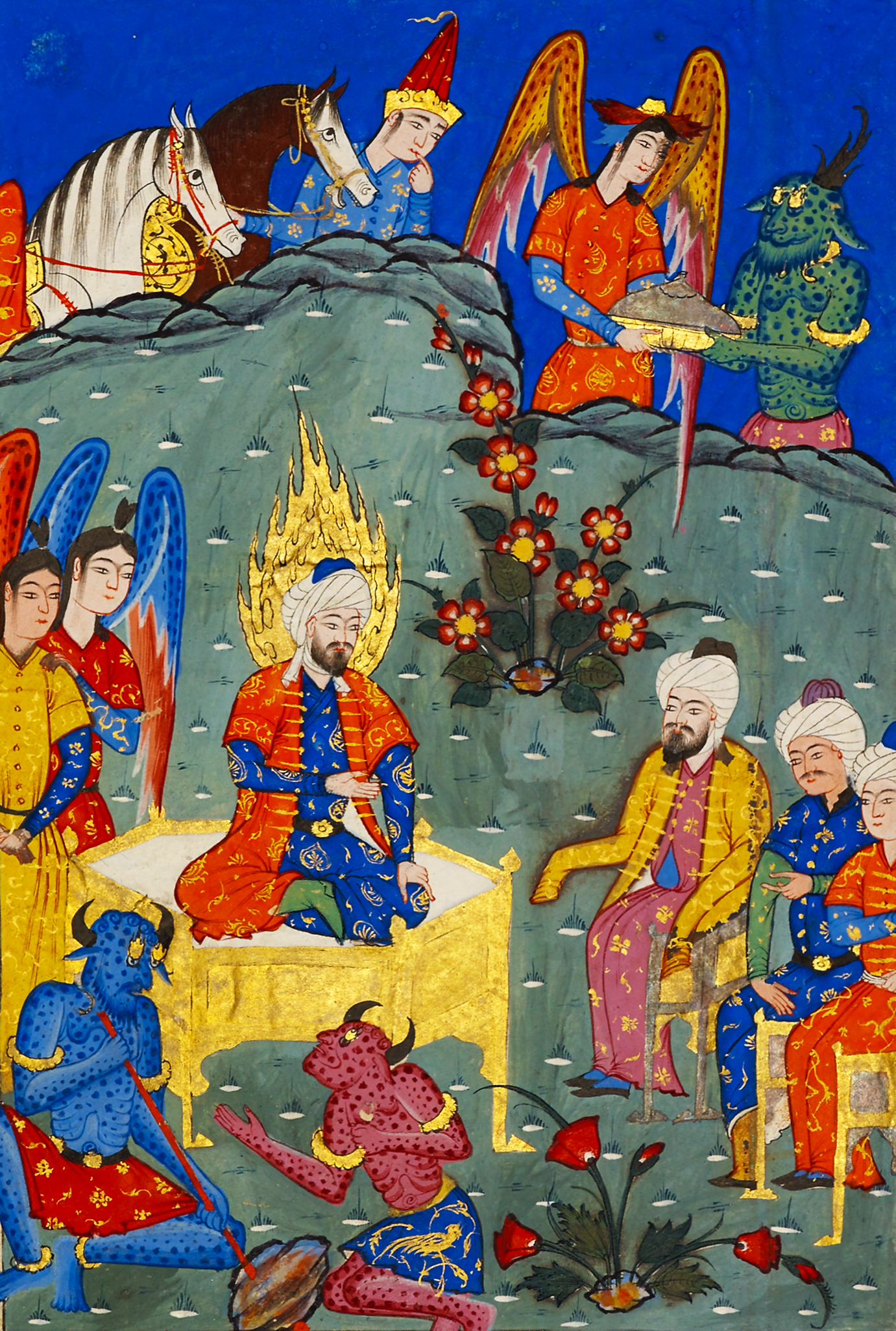
- Sulayman holding court on his golden throne. Men, angels, and divs serve him.

Prophet of Islam
- Preceded by: Dawud
- Succeeded by: Ilyas
- Title: Ruler of the Israelites

Personal life
- Born: Jerusalem, Kingdom of Israel
- Died: Jerusalem, Kingdom of Israel
- Resting place: Al-Ḥaram ash-Sharīf, Jerusalem
- Parent: Dawud (father)
- Known for: Enslaving the shayatin; Communicating with animals and djinn; Converting Queen Bilqis to Islam.

Religious life
- Religion: Islam

In Islam, Sulaymān ibn Dāwūd (Arabic: سُلَيْمَان ٱبْن دَاوُوْد, lit. 'Solomon, son of David') is described as a nabī (نَبِيّ, lit. 'prophet') and ruler of the Israelites in the Quran. Since the rise of Islam, various Muslim historians have regarded Solomon as one of the greatest rulers in history. Solomon's rule inspired several Islamic leaders throughout history.

Solomon is regarded to have been bestowed by God the gift to speak to animals and djinn. Furthermore was granted the ability to enslave the devils (Arabic: شَيَاطِين, romanized: šayāṭīn; f.v. Persian: دیو, romanized: div) with the help of a staff or ring given by God. Solomon's battle with the demons plays an important role in Sufistic interpretations of Islam as the internal struggle of the self against demonic urges.

Generally, Islamic tradition holds that he was the third ruler of the Israelites and a wise one. In contrast to Talmudic tradition, Muslims maintain that Solomon remained faithful to God throughout his life and was blessed with authority given to none before nor after him. Despite his miraculous abilities, his success stems from solely relying on God, as seen in the challenge of bringing the Throne of Sheba. For that, he was, according to the Quran, promised nearness to God in Jannah (جَنّة, lit. 'Paradise') at the end of his life.

== Quran and interpretation ==
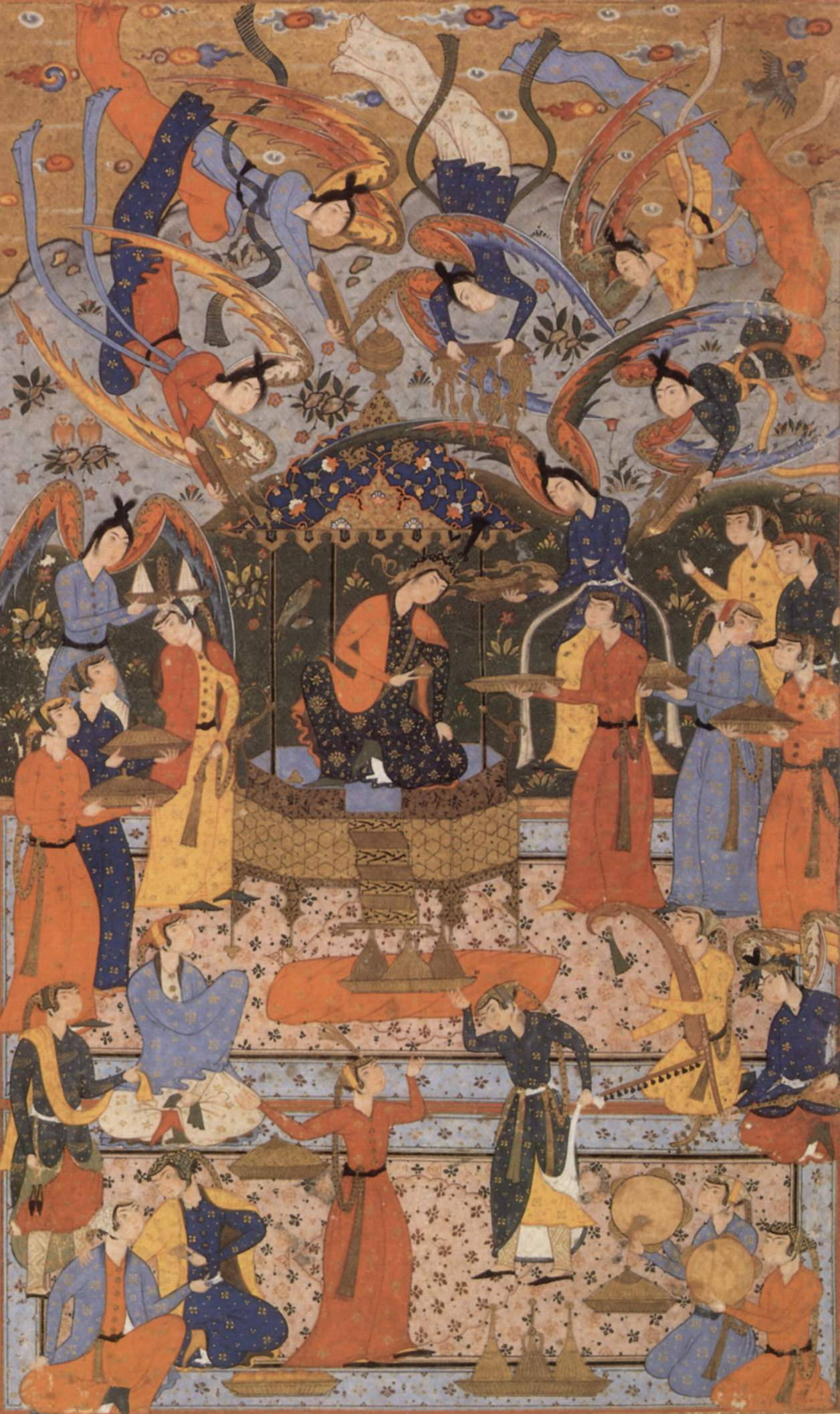
The Queen of Sheba

=== Judgment on the field ===
In the earliest narrative involving Sulayman, the Quran (21:78) briefly alludes to a story that Sulayman was in the company of his father, when two men came to ask David to judge between them regarding a ḥarth (حَرْث, field). Later Muslim commentators expanded on the allusion, including al-Tabari, Baidawi, and Ibn Kathir. They said that the first of the two men said that he owned a vineyard of which he took great care the whole year through. But one day, when he was absent, the other man's sheep had strayed into the vineyard and devoured the grapes. He asked to be compensated for this damage. Upon hearing the man's complaint, Solomon suggested that the owner of the sheep take the other man's vineyard to repair and cultivate until the vines returned to their former state, whereupon he should return it to its owner. At the same time, the owner of the vineyard would care for the sheep and benefit from their wool and milk until his land was returned to him, at which point he would return the sheep to their owner. This response shows Solomon's level of judgment, which, the Quran says, would characterize Sulayman throughout his life. Ḥikmah (Wisdom), according to Muslim tradition, would always be associated with Solomon, who would later even be referred to as Sulaymān al-Ḥakīm (سُلَيْمَان ٱلْحَكِيْم, "Sulayman the Wise"). This story is adapted in the Kebra Nagast, but as a dispute adjudicated by a son of Sulayman.

=== Solomon and the demons ===
The Quran narrates that Solomon, controlled the wind and the jinn. The jinn helped strengthen Solomon's reign. God caused a miraculous ʿayn (عَيْن, 'fount' or 'spring') of molten qiṭr (قِطْر, 'brass' or 'copper') to flow for Solomon, used by the jinn in their construction. The devils (shayatin) and demons were forced building for him monuments.

When David died, Solomon inherited his position as the prophetic king of the Israelites.

==== Sunni tradition of Solomon losing his ring: ====
Solomon once permitted a woman to build a statue of her father. Later, she began to worship the statue and Solomon was rebuked for tolerating idolatry in his kingdom. He later ask for forgiveness for this (unintentional) mistake and gains control over the demons again, focusing on building the temple again. He prayed to God to grant him a kingdom which would be unlike any after him. God accepted Solomon's prayer and gave him what he pleased.

Construed allegorically, Solomon's loss of his ring to the demons, may be understood to represent a human losing its soul to demonic passion. Attar of Nishapur writes: "If you bind the div (demon), you will set out for the royal pavilion with Solomon" and "You have no command over your self's kingdom, for in your case the div is in the place of Solomon."

Unlike the Talmudic tradition, Solomon was unaware and never participated in idolatry. Further, the Quran rejects that Solomon was a magician: "Never did Solomon disbelieve, rather the devils disbelieved. They taught magic to the people..." (2:102)

=== Solomon and the ant ===
Solomon was taught the languages of various animals, such as ants. The Quran recounts that, one day, Solomon and his army entered a wādin-naml (وَادِ ٱلْنَّمْل, valley of the ant). On seeing Solomon and his army, a namlah (نَمْلَة, female ant) warned all the others to "get into your habitations, lest Solomon and his hosts crush you (under foot) without knowing it." Immediately understanding what the ant said, Solomon, as always, prayed to God, thanking him for bestowing upon him such gifts and further avoided trampling over the ant colonies. Solomon's wisdom, however, was yet another of the gifts he received from God, and Muslims maintain that Solomon never forgot his daily prayer, which was more important to him than any of his gifts.

Exegetical literature emphasizes the ant's wisdom and explains the meaning behind Solomon's gift to control the wind. According to the Siraj al-Qulub, a popular text with versions in Persian, Oghuz Turkic, and Karluc Turkic, the ant asked Solomon if he knows why he is called "Solomon" (Süleyman). Solomon says he does not, whereupon the ant goes on to explain: "Although your heart was sound (selim) and you know the circumstances of the next world, you have accepted a few pleasures of this world and have been deceived by its possession and kingship; therefore you are called Solomon." Afterwards, the ant asks Solomon if he knows why God has subdued the wind for him. Once again, Solomon negates and the ant answers: "He has subdued the wind for a reason: that which you have accepted is nothing. Just as the wind passes, the world's wealth and kingship pass too." Scholars like Fakhr al-Din Razi and al-Qurtubi elevated the ant to the rank of an exemplar for humans to follow.

=== Conquest of Saba' ===
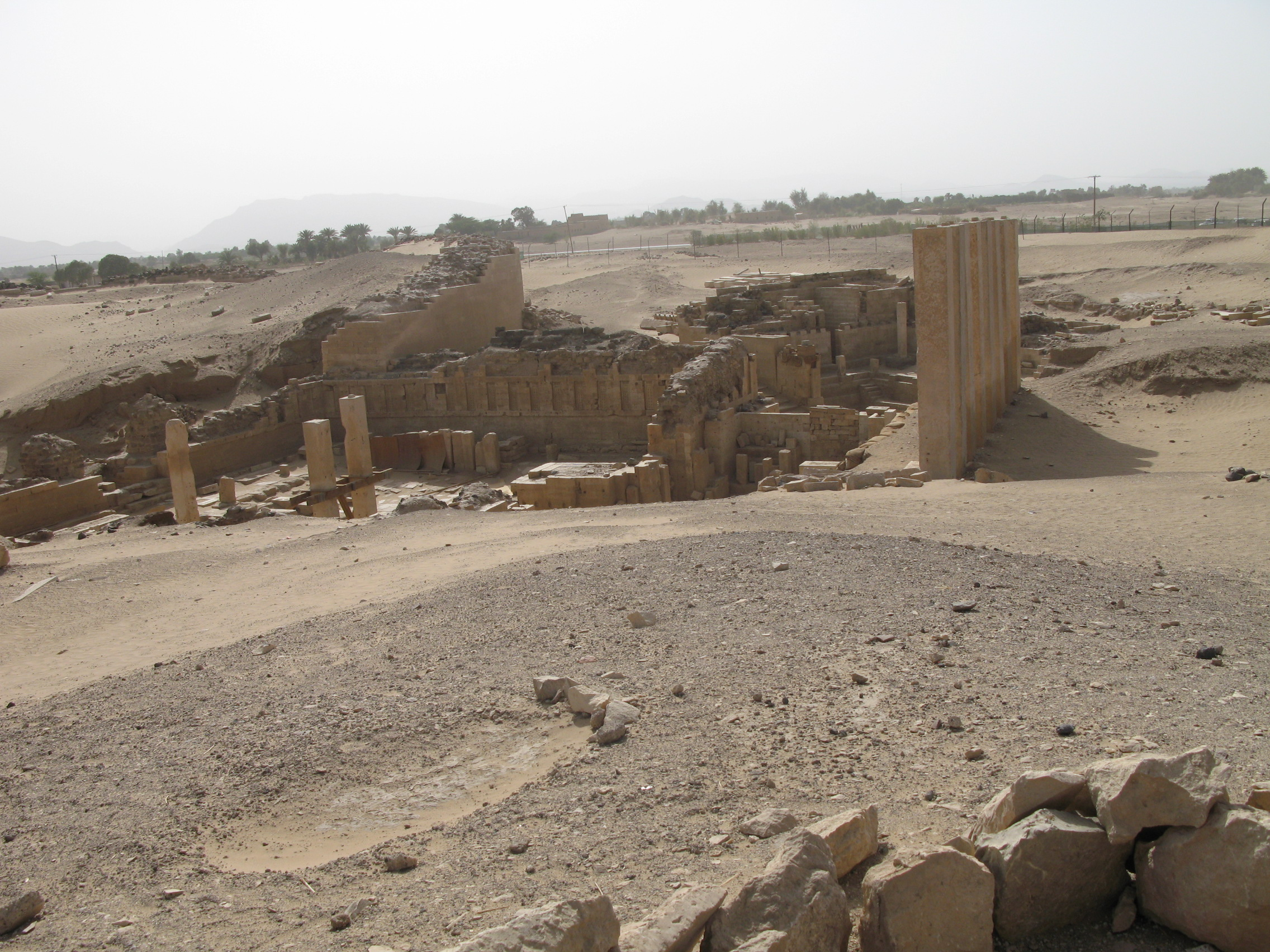
Ruins of the Temple of Awwam at Ma'rib, the former capital of Saba' in what is now Yemen

Another important aspect of Solomon's kingship was the size of his army, which consisted of both men and jinn. Solomon would frequently assess his troops and warriors as well as the jinn and all the animals who worked under him. One day, when inspecting his troops, Solomon found the Hud-hud (هُدْهُد, Hoopoe) missing from the assembly. Soon afterwards, however, the Hud-hud arrived at Solomon's court, saying "I have found out something you do not know. I have just come to you from Sheba with sure news." The Hud-hud further told Solomon that the people of Sheba worshiped the Sun, and that the woman who ruled the kingdom was highly intelligent and powerful. Solomon, who listened closely, chose to write a letter to the land of Sheba, through which he would try to convince the people of Sheba to cease their idolatrous worship of the Sun, and come to the worship of Allah. Solomon ordered the Hud-hud to give the letter to the Queen of Sheba (Bilqis), and then to hide and observe her reaction. The Hud-hud accepted Solomon's orders, and flew straight back to Sheba to deliver the letter to the Queen. The Queen then called her ministers to court and read aloud to them the letter from Solomon stating to the people of Sheba: "In the Name of Allah—the Most Compassionate, Most Merciful, Do not be arrogant with me, but come to me, fully submitting (Muslimīn مُسْلِمِيْن)." She took counsel with her ministers and other court officials, saying "O chiefs! Advise me in this matter of mine, for I would never make any decision without you." The people of the court replied: "We are a people of strength and great ˹military˺ might, but the decision is yours, so decide what you will command." At length, however, the Queen came to Solomon, announcing her submission to God.

=== Solomon and the ifrit ===
While Bilqis was journeying to Solomon's court, the king bid his servants deliver her throne thither before her arrival. An ifrit offered his services (27:38-40), but Solomon declined, entrusting this task instead to a manservant, named Asif ibn Barkhiya in traditions. Being a pious fellow, the manservant prayed to God to move the throne for him. His prayer was answered, the throne appearing in Solomon's palace by the power of God. When Bilqis arrived, Solomon asked her if she recognised her throne. Struggling to grasp the miracle God had wrought, she at first gave the king an evasive answer, but later adopting the faith of Solomon, won over by the evidence that the miracle was not that of a mere Ifrit but that of God himself. Solomon had declined the ifrit's tempting offer, because he sought to rely solely upon God and not upon a demon or any other created being, and was rewarded for his piety with success in converting Bilqis to the true faith.

=== Death ===
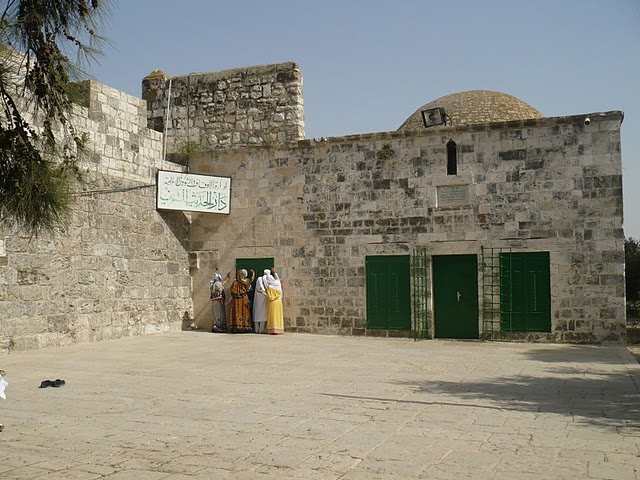
Throne of Sulayman in the Masjid Al-Aqsa (Temple Mount), Old City of Jerusalem

The Quran relates that Solomon died while he was leaning upon his staff and that he remained standing, propped up by it, until a little creature – ant or worm – gnawed at it, until, finally, it gave way – and only then did his body collapse.

When We decreed Solomon's death, nothing indicated to the ˹subjected˺ jinn that he was dead except the termites eating away his staff. So when he collapsed, the jinn realized that if they had ˹really˺ known the unseen, they would not have remained in ˹such˺ humiliating servitude.

— Surah Saba 34:14

As he remained upright, propped on his staff, the jinn thought he was still alive and supervising them.

They realized the truth only when God sent a creature to crawl out of the ground and gnaw at Solomon's staff, until his body collapsed. This verse is understood to teach the audience that jinn do not know the unseen (Al-Ghaib) – had they known it, they would not have remained toiling like fools in the service of a dead man.

== In culture ==
=== Solomon and Selcuk leaders ===
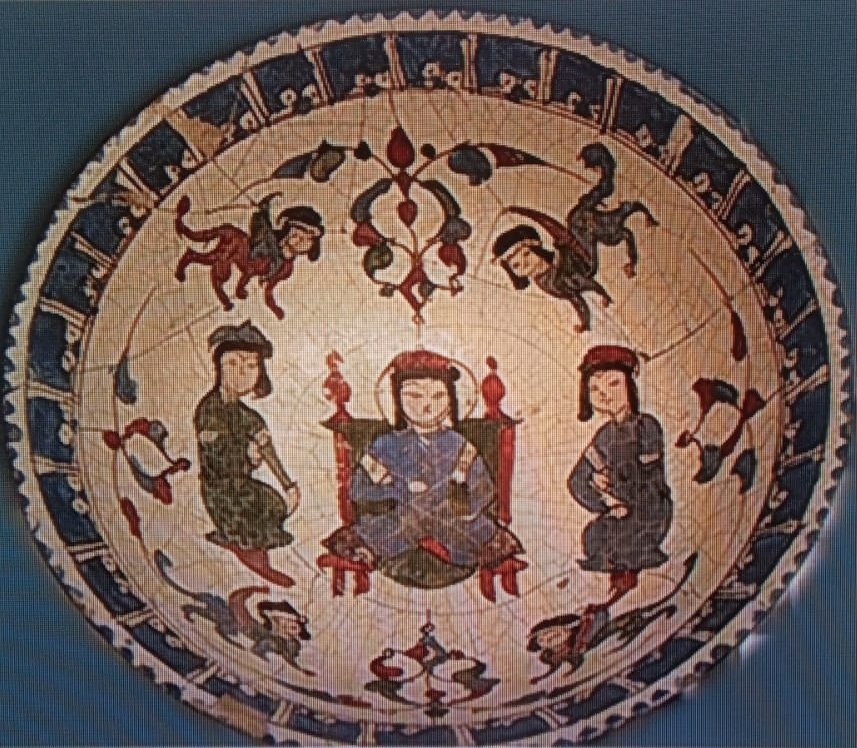
Kashan, Iran, late 12th–13th century mina’i-fritware bowl. The scene in this bowl depicts the enthroned (Second) Sulaymān with messengers and advisors to either side, the latter in form of jinn.

The title "The Sulaymān of the Age" was employed for various leaders of the Seljuk Sultanate of Rum. Among them Suleiman II of Rûm, Kilij Arslan II, and Suleiman ibn Qutalmish. They were compared to the Quranic prophet due to their governmental body (Divan), consisting of people speaking various languages, including Greek, Armenian, Turkish, and later, Mongolian, foreign craftsmen (compared to the jinn at Solomon's court), and usage of messenger pigeons.

=== Solomon and Jamshid ===
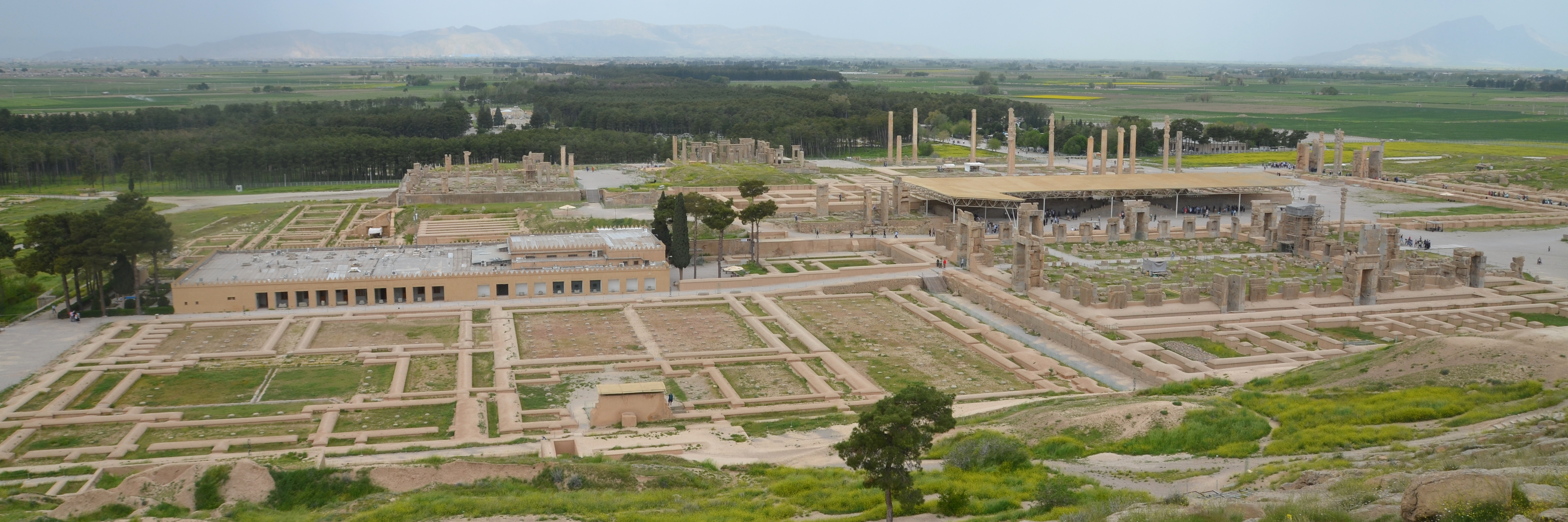
The ruins of Persepolis in Iran

Jamshid was the fourth king of the world, according to the Shāhnāma of the poet Firdausī. Like Solomon, he was believed to have had command over all the angels and demons (dīv) of the world, and was both king and high priest of Hormozd (middle Persian for Ahura Mazda). He was responsible for many great inventions that made life more secure for his people: the manufacture of armor and weapons, the weaving and dyeing of clothes of linen, silk and wool, the building of houses of brick, the mining of jewels and precious metals, the making of perfumes and wine, the art of medicine, the navigation of the waters of the world in sailing ships. He Jamshid had now become the greatest monarch the world had ever known. He was endowed with the royal farr (Avestan: khvarena), a radiant splendor that burned about him by divine favor.

Due to similarities between the two wise monarchs, some traditions conflate the two. For example, Solomon was associated with ruling over the southwestern Iran in the works of al-Balkhi. Persepolis was believed to be the seat of Solomon and described as "playground of Solomon" by scholars such as Mas'udi, Muqaddasi and Istakhri. Other Muslim authors have opposed the belief that Solomon once ruled in Iran Persia, arguing that any similarities between the lives and deeds of Solomon and Jamshid are purely coincidental, the two being distinct and separate personages. The latter view has been vindicated by scholarship in the field of Indo-European mythology, which has demonstrated conclusively that the character Jamshid derives from the early Zoroastrian deity Yima, whereas Quranic and Biblical scholarship support a measure of historicity for the wise prophet king.

== Mahammaddim in the Song of Solomon ==
As inspired by verses of the Quran, some Muslims believed that Muhammad (Arabic: مُحَمَّد "praiseworthy", consonant letters: m-ħ-m-d) is mentioned in the Song of Songs(5:16) (Hebrew: מַחֲמַדִּים "beloved, desirable, delightful", consonant letters: m-ħ-m-d-y-m, maḥămaddim).

== References to Solomon in the Quran ==
- Appraisals for Solomon: 2:102, 6:84, 21:81-82, 27:15-16, 27:18-23, 27:36-39, 27:44, 34:12-13, 38:30-31, 38:35-40
- Solomon's preaching: 4:163, 27:25, 27:31, 27:44
- Solomon judged: 21:78-79
- Fitnah to Solomon: 38:32-34
- Solomon and the Queen of Sheba: 27:28-31, 27:34-44
- The Kingdom of Sheba: 27:23, 34:15, 34:18
- Solomon's death: 34:14

== See also ==
- Biblical narratives and the Quran
- Harut and Marut
- Legends and the Quran
- Qiṣaṣ al-Anbiyāʾ ("Stories of the Prophets")
- Queen of Sheba
- Sulayman
- Sūrat an-Naml ("Chapter of the Ant")
- The Kingdom of Solomon
