= Rabia Balkhi =

10th-century Persian poet

- رابعه بلخی
- Modern illustration of Rabia Balkhi
- Resting place: Shrine of Khwaja Abu Nasr Parsa (Balkh, Afghanistan)
- Occupation: Poet
- Writing career
- Language: Arabic; Persian

Rabia Balkhi (Arabic: رابعة بنت كعب, Persian: رابعه بلخی) also known as Rabia al-Quzdari (or Khuzdari), (Note: Also transliterated as Rabi'a Balkhi, Rabe'eh Balkhi (or Qozdari), and Rabe'a of Balkh (or Qozdar).) was a 10th-century writer who composed poetry in Persian and Arabic. She is the first known female poet to write in Persian.

A non-mystic poet, her imagery was later transformed into that of a mystic poet by authors such as Attar of Nishapur (died 1221) and Jami (died 1492). She became a semi-legendary figure, famous for her love story with the slave Bektash.

Her shrine is located in the mausoleum of the 15th-century Naqshbandi Sufi Khwaja Abu Nasr Parsa (died 1460) in the city of Balkh, now present-day Afghanistan. She is celebrated in the Balochistan province of Pakistan, Afghanistan and Iran through various schools, hospitals, and roads being named after her.

== Background ==
She is known by various names, Rabia Balkhi, Rabia al-Quzdar (or Khuzdari), and anonymously as a "daughter of Ka'b". Most of her life is considered to be obscure. Rabia was said to have been descended from an Arab family that had settled in Khurasan following the Muslim conquest. The Iranologist Vladimir Minorsky considered her last name, Quzdari, to connect her to the city of Khuzdar in Balochistan. The German Orientalist Hellmut Ritter dismissed the narrative that Rabia's father was an Arab who ruled over Balkh, which the modern historian Tahera Aftab considers to indirectly support Rabia's connection to Khuzdar. According to the Iranologist Hamid Dabashi, Rabia was a Persianized Arab.

== Biography ==
Rabia lived during the same period as the poet Rudaki (died 940/41), and is the first known Persian woman poet. She felt strongly about Sufism, and composed poetry in Persian and Arabic. The 14th-century poet and anthologist Jajarmi states that Rabia wrote a Persian poem which used Arabic for the shahada and lahwalah, which according to the Iranologist Francois de Blois demonstrates her enthusiasm for bilingual tricks.

Rabia appears in the Lubab ul-Albab, a compilation of Persian poets made by the 12th and 13th-century writer Awfi (died 1242). The compilation says the following about her: "The daughter of Ka'b, although she was a woman, was superior to men in accomplishments. She possessed great intelligence and sharp temperament. She used to continuously play the game of love and admired beautiful youths." Rabia is amongst the thirty-five female Sufis mentioned in the 15th-century Persian work Nafahat al-Uns, a biographical compilation made by Jami (died 1492). Referring her as the "daughter of Ka'b", Jami narrates the story through the prominent Sufi master and poet, Abu Sa'id Abu'l-Khayr (died 1049), reporting that she fell in love with a slave.

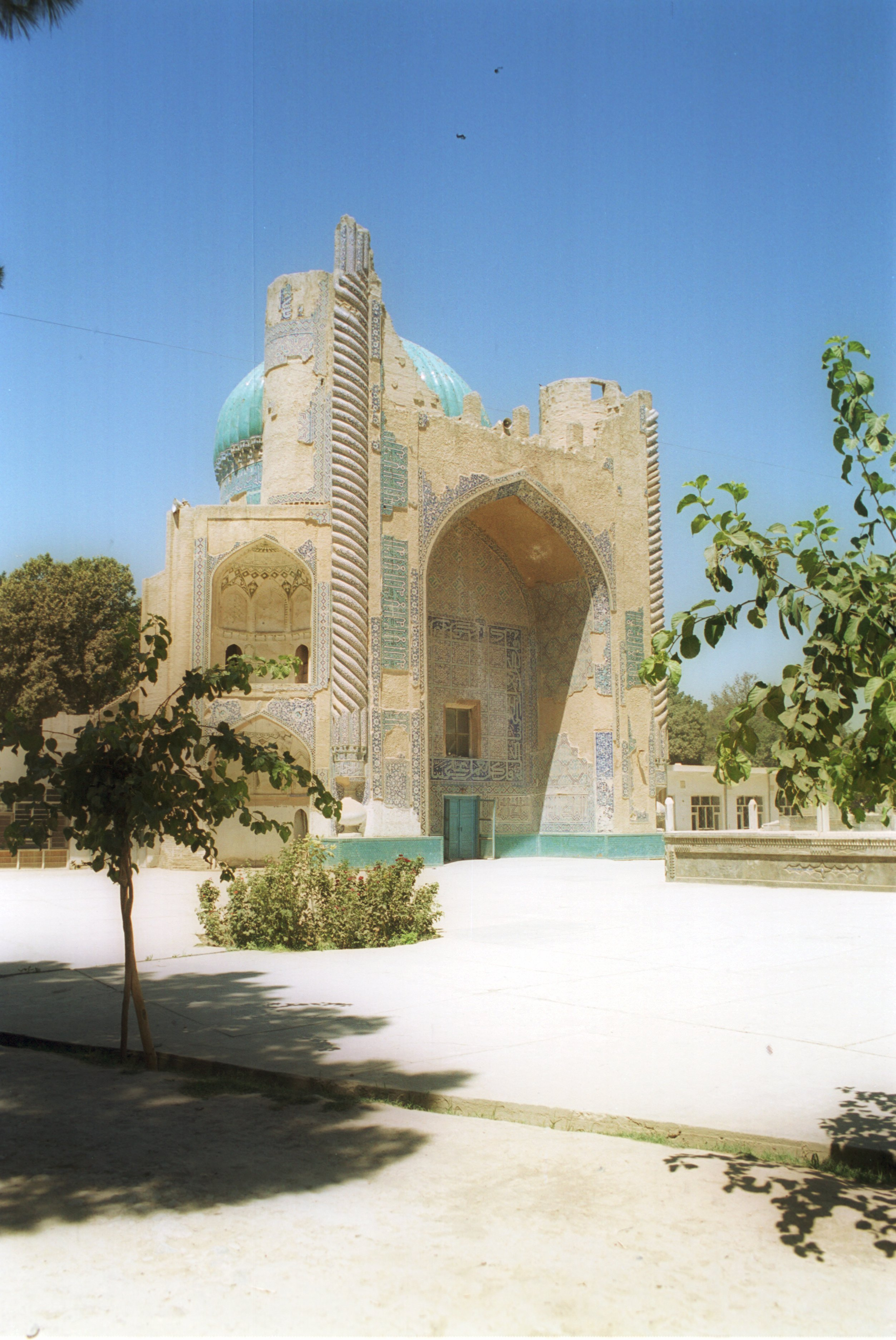
The mausoleum of Khwaja Abu Nasr Parsa (died 1460), where Rabia Balkhi's shrine is located

A romanticized version of this story appears in the Ilahi-nama of the Sufi poet Attar of Nishapur (died 1221), under a story named Hikayat Amir-i Balkh wa ashiq shudan dukhtar-i o ("the story of the chieftain of Balkh and his daughter's falling in love"). The story narrates Rabia's love affair with Bektash, a slave of her brother Haris, and concludes with the death of both Rabia and Bektash. Attar does not use the name "Rabia" either when referring to her, and instead calls her Zainu'l Arab ("the ornament of the Arabs"). He wrote that it was very difficult for him to describe her face due to her attractiveness. Francois de Blois dismisses Attar's story, considering it to have "no value as a biographical source" for Rabia.

The modern historian Sunil Sharma notes that Rabia initially started out as non-mystic figure, being portrayed by Awfi as a "boy-chasing intelligent woman", and was only later portrayed as a mystic poet by authors such as Attar and Jami. Dabashi notes that Rabia later became a "semi-legendary figure who putatively wrote her last poems with her blood on the prison walls of the jail in which she had been incarcerated because of her love for a slave named Bektash." Her love story with Bektash encouraged the 19th-century writer Reza-Qoli Khan Hedayat (died 1871) to write the romantic epic of Golestan-e Eram or Bektash-nama, which tells the story of the two pairs.

Rabia's shrine is located in the mausoleum of the 15th-century Naqshbandi Sufi Khwaja Abu Nasr Parsa (died 1460) in the city of Balkh, now present-day Afghanistan. The shrine was renovated between 2012 and 2016. She is celebrated in the Balochistan province of Pakistan, Afghanistan and Iran through various schools, hospitals, and roads being named after her. She is seen by women as the embodiment of the voice they have been deprived of. An important part of the cinema of Afghanistan was the 1974 film Rabia of Balkh, which according to Krista Geneviéve Lynes had an important role in the "figuration of a proto-feminist political agency, one that in many respects resembles the ethnical call for justice in Sophocles's Antigone."

== See also ==
- List of Iranian women writers and poets

== Sources ==
- Aftab, Tahera (2022). Sufi Women of South Asia: Veiled Friends of God. Brill. ISBN 978-9004467170.
- Blois, Francois de (2004). Persian Literature - A Bio-Bibliographical Survey: Poetry of the Pre-Mongol Period (Volume V). Routledge. ISBN 978-0947593476.
- Dabashi, Hamid (2012). The World of Persian Literary Humanism. Harvard University Press. ISBN 978-0-674-06759-2.
- "Khwaja Parsa Complex Conservation". archnet.org.
- Losensky, Paul E. (2003). "Hedayat, Reżāqoli Khan". In Yarshater, Ehsan (ed.). Encyclopædia Iranica. Vol. XII/2: Hedāyat al-mota'allemin–Herat VII. London and New York: Routledge & Kegan Paul. pp. 119–121. ISBN 978-0-933273-75-7.
- Rypka, Jan (1968). History of Iranian Literature. Springer Netherlands. ISBN 978-9401034814.
- Sharma, Sunil (2009). "From ʿĀʾesha to Nur Jahān: The Shaping of a Classical Persian Poetic Canon of Women". Journal of Persianate Studies (2). Brill: 148–164. doi:10.1163/187470909X12535030823698. Archived from the original on 3 August 2022.
