= Ma'ruf Balkhi =

10th century Persian poet

Ma'ruf Balkhi or Ma'rufi Balkhi (Persian: معروف بلخی) was a Persian poet from Balkh, who was one of the first to compose poems in New Persian. Most of his work has perished, and only fragments have survived. He most likely flourished in the middle of the 10th-century, due to some of his work being dedicated to the Samanid ruler (amir) Abd al-Malik I (r. 954–961). He may also have been present at the court of the last Saffarid ruler of Sistan, Khalaf ibn Ahmad (r. 963–1002).
