= Balki =

Balki may refer to:

- Bałki, a village in Poland
- R. Balki, Indian film director and advertising executive
- Balki Bartokomous, a fictional character on the television show Perfect Strangers
- Balki 'the Young' Pálsson, a character in the Old Norse saga Hákonar saga Hákonarsonar

== See also ==
- Balkhi (disambiguation)
