= Ata Kakwi =

Indian poet and writer (1907–1998)

- Born: Syed Shah Ataur Rahman; 1907; Kako, Bihar, India
- Died: 18 March 1998 (aged 90–91); Patna, Bihar, India
- Resting place: Campus of Dargah Shah Arzan, Patna
- Occupations: Professor, writer, poet

Academic work
- Discipline: History, religion
- Sub-discipline: Sufism, Bihar
- Institutions: Patna University

Syed Shah Ataur Rahman (1907–18 March 1998) popularly known as Ata Kakwi was an Indian poet and writer. He was a contemporary of Wali Azimabadi, Akhtar Qadri, Azizuddin Balkhi and Fasihuddin Balkhi. He served as the head of the Department of Persian at Patna University.

He was a director of Arabic and Persian Research Institute, Patna. He had served as the professor in the Urdu, Arabic and Persian department of Langat Singh College, Muzaffarpur from 1937 to 1954 succeeding Dr. Abdul Majeed Akhtar. He was related to the Abulolai-Naqshbandi order of Sufism.

He was the father of Arshad Kakvi, a known Urdu poet.

== Early life ==
Syed Shah Ataur Rahman was born to Syed Shah Ghafurur Rahman Hamd Kakvi in Kako, Jehanabad district, Bihar in 1907.

He passed matriculation from Gaya Zila School, Gaya. He was a student of Shad Azimabadi in poetry.

== Books ==
- Pesh-i guftār: dībācon̲ kā majmūʻah, 1989
- Miʻyār va mīzān: tabṣire, 1989
- Taḥqīqī mut̤ālaʻe: Taḥqīqī maqālon̲ kā majmūʻah, 1965
- Ās̲ār-i Kāko, 1986
- Mut̤ālaʻah-yi Shād, 1966
- Ḥarf-i avvalīn: apnī taṣānīf va tālīfāt ke dībāce, 1989
- Gulhā-yi rang rang, 1970

== Death and legacy ==
He died on 18 March 1998, in Patna and buried under the campus of Dargah Shah Arzan.

The Urdu Directorate, Bihar organized a commemorative program for Ata Kakwi on 26 October 2022 at the Abhilekh Bhawan Bihar State Archive Directorate, Patna.
