= Green Mosque, Balkh =

Mosque in Balkh, Afghanistan

Green Mosque
- مَسجد سَبز
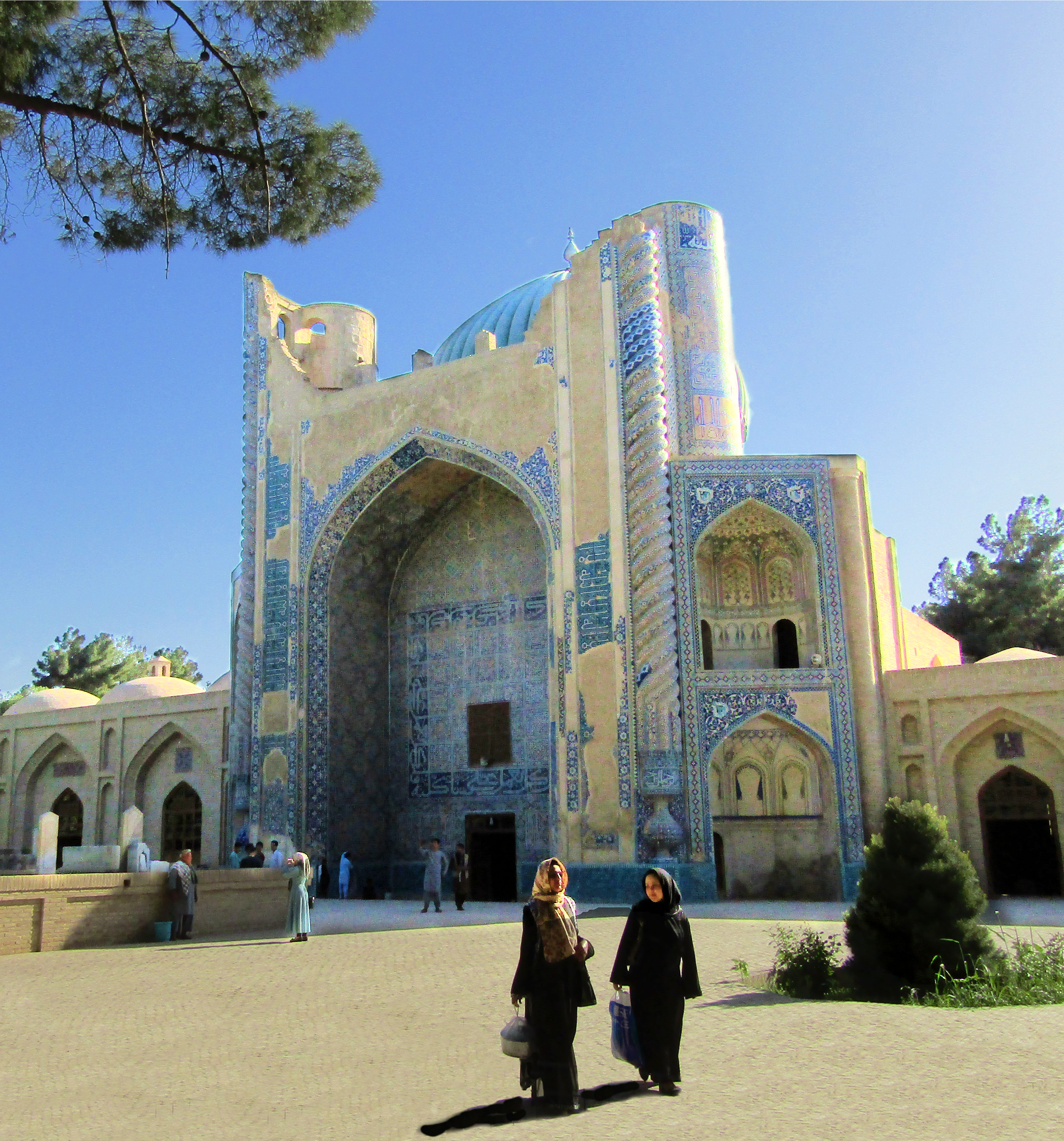
- The mosque iwan in 2018

- Location of the mosque in Afghanistan

Religion
- Affiliation: Sunni Islam
- Sect: Sufism (Naqshbandi)
- Ecclesiastical or organizational status: Mosque, madrasa and mausoleum
- Leadership: Parsa'i family
- Status: Active; used for worship (partial ruinous state)

Location
- Location: Balkh
- Country: Afghanistan
- Interactive map of Green Mosque
- Coordinates: 36°45′30″N 66°53′48″E

Architecture
- Type: Islamic architecture
- Style: Timurid
- Founder: Mir Mazid Arghun
- Groundbreaking: 1419
- Completed: 1421

Specifications
- Dome: One
- Minaret: Two (ruined)
- Shrine: One: (Khwaja Abu Nasr Parsa)
- Materials: Turquoise kashi tiles; ceramic tiles; bricks; stone

The Green Mosque (Pashto: شنه جومات; Dari: مَسجد سَبز, romanized: Masjid Sabz), or the Mosque of Khawaja Abu Nasr Parsa (Pashto: د خواجه ابو نصر پارسا جومات), is a mosque, madrasa and mausoleum complex located in the city of Balkh, in northern Afghanistan. The complex contains the Shrine of Khwaja Abu Nasr Parsa. The mosque's name is derived from the kashi tiles on the walls of the mosque, which are coloured turquoise, known locally as Turkish Green. The mosque was completed in 1421, during the Timurid era.

== History ==
The original building was constructed by the Timurid general Mir Mazid Arghun over the grave of Khawaja Abu Nasr Parsa, a local religious teacher and mystic of the Naqshbandi order. Later on, Arghun's father and brother were buried there. Arghun also constructed a madrasah next to the mosque. The mosque, shrine and madrasah complex was then put under the management of the descendants of Abu Nasr Parsa. The Shaybanid governor of Balkh, Abdul-Mo'min bin Abdullah Khan, later renovated the building in the late 16th century, inscribing his name on one of the walls as well.

The mosque suffered severe damage during the Soviet-Afghan War, and it fell into massive disrepair. In 2022, an explosion inside the mosque caused the destruction of some parts of the mosque as well.

== Architecture ==
The main building displays a typical Timurid style. The mosque has a very large dome and two minarets. Eight openings allow light to enter the dome, but some of them have cracked, revealing the inner structure of the dome. The dome has a base of muqarnas and the bottom part is covered with floral designs and ceramic tiles.

The bi-level porches flanking the portal are topped with two minarets. There are stairs in each corner of the porch which allow access to the top level, letting one go to the minarets and the roof. The minarets are damaged and only the base and stumps of them remain. A small wooden door leads from the northeastern iwan into the dome chamber, crowned by a tall umbrella vault There are sixteen windows placed at the rim of the vault, which assist in illuminating the interior. The dome chamber has a small mihrab niche on the southwest wall as well.

There is a crypt located directly below the dome chamber. A tomb was found in the crypt, and it is suggested that the tomb belongs to Abu Nasr Parsa. A column was added later to support the crown of the crypt vault. Outside the mosque, there is a stone platform with tombstones of other saints. This was a later addition and unlikely to have been part of the original structure.

== Gallery ==
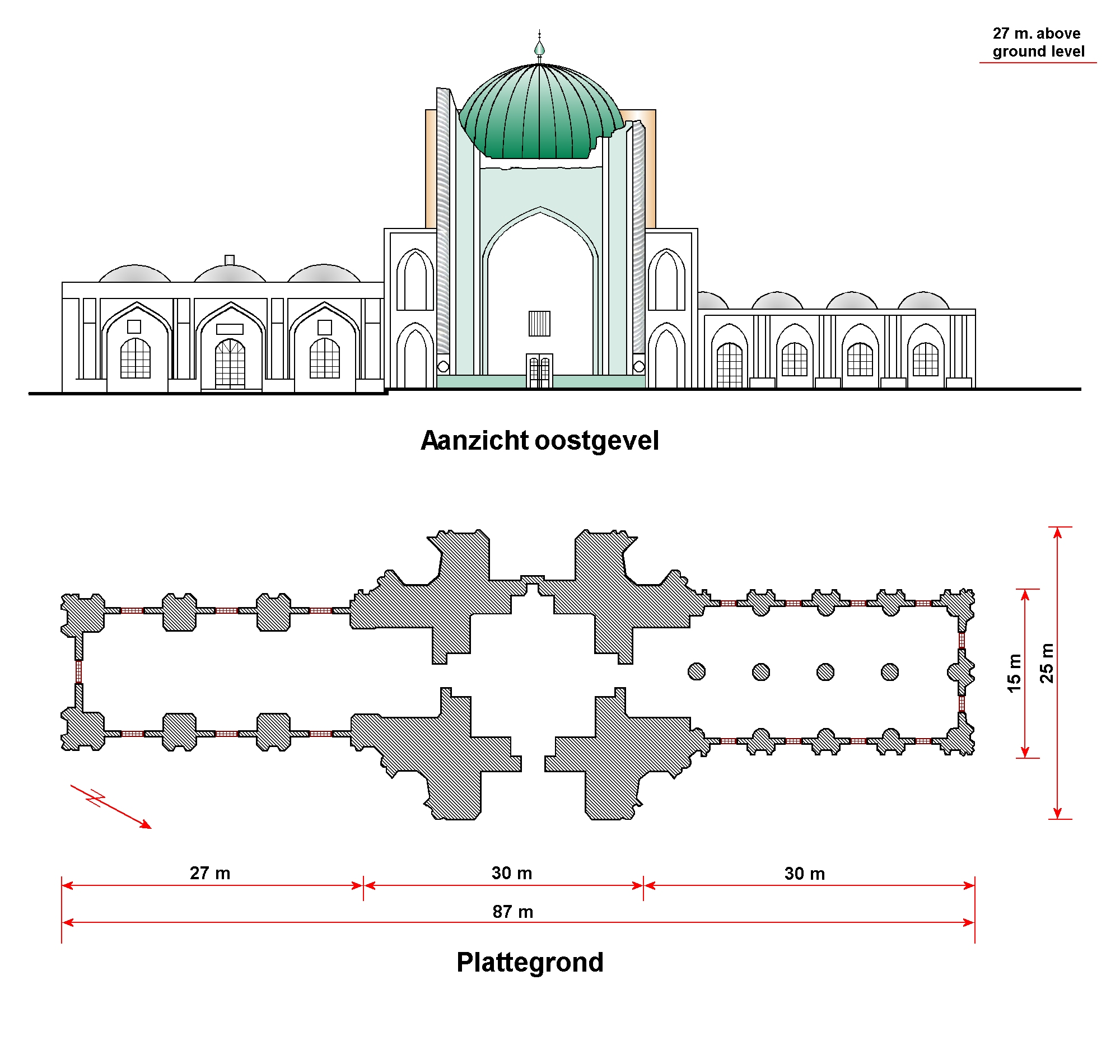
Schets Green Mosque Balkh

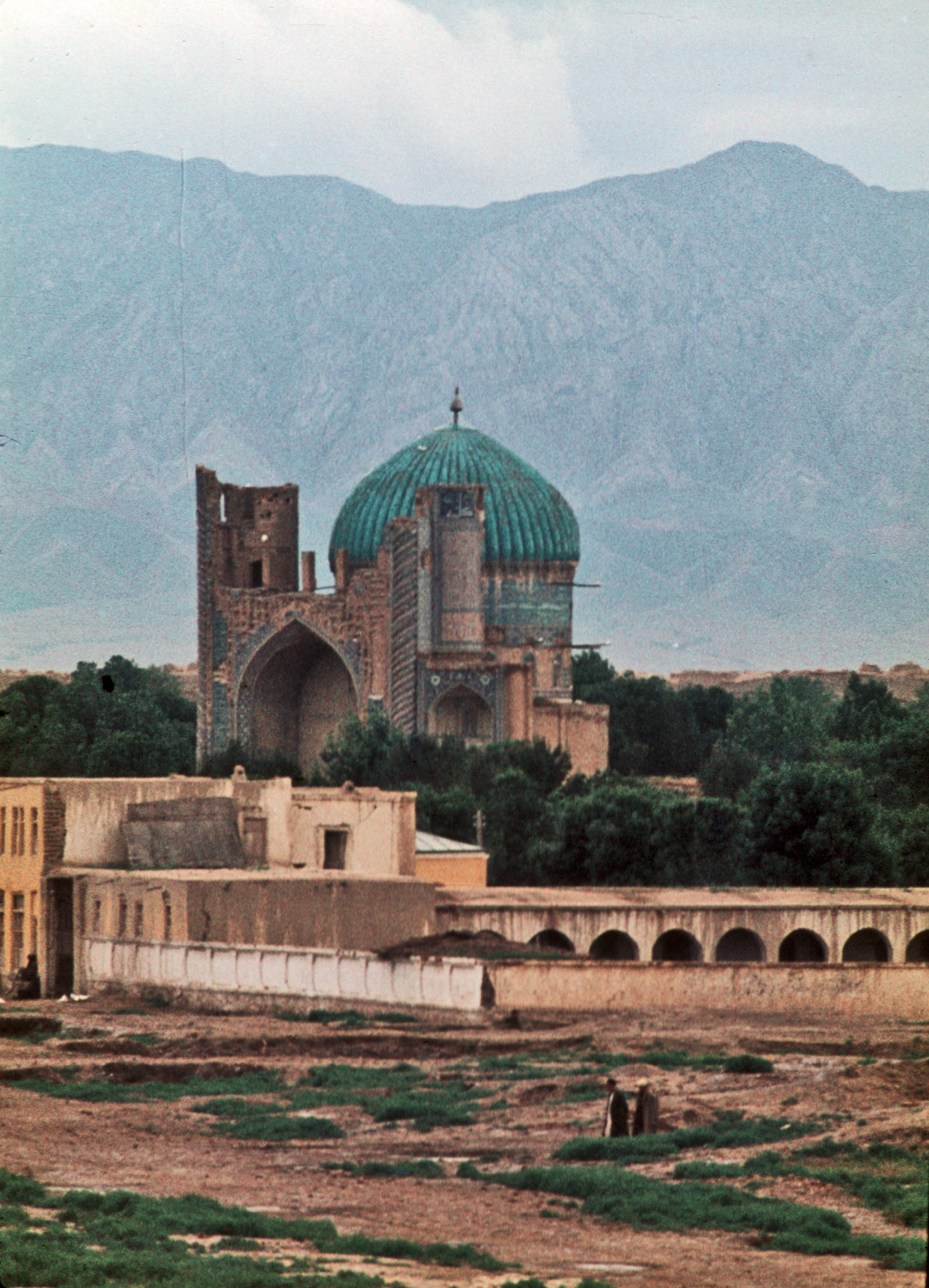
The mosque from a distance

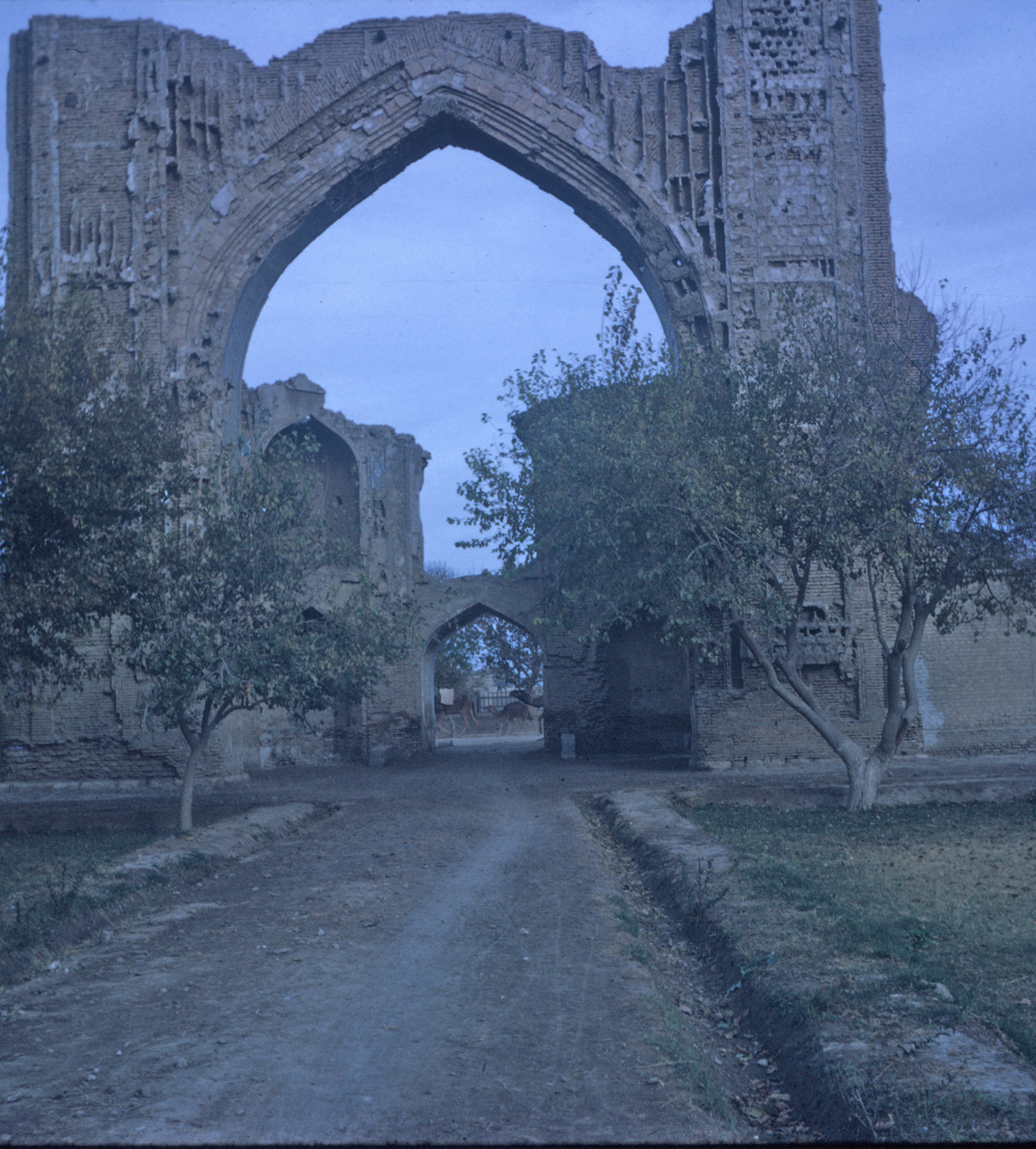
One of the main entrances to the complex

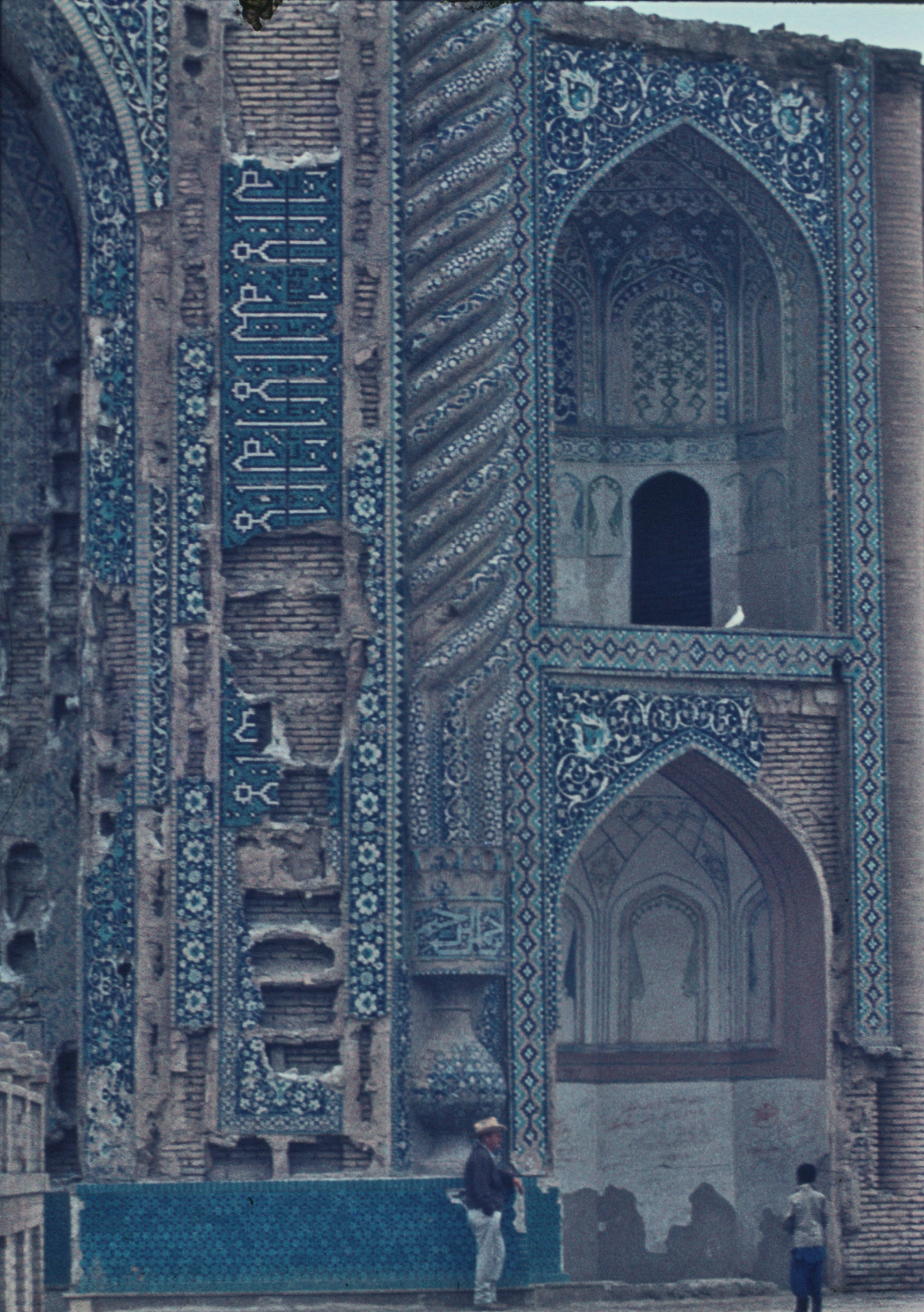
Closeup of the entrance iwan

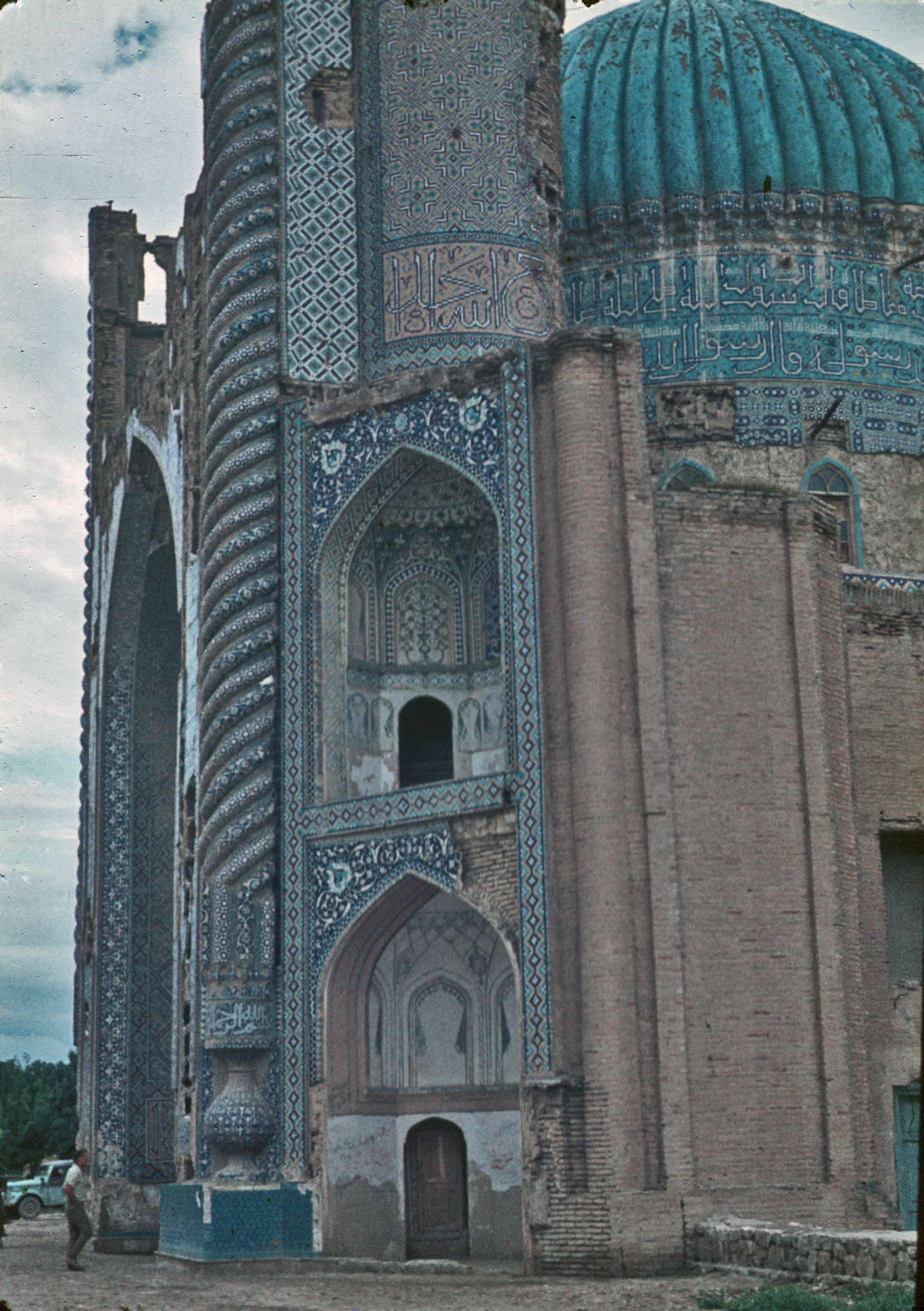
A closeup shot of the exterior of the building

== See also ==
- List of mosques in Afghanistan
- Tourism in Afghanistan
