= Kumargah =

- Location in Afghanistan
- Coordinates: 36°37′30″N 67°23′0″E
- Country: Afghanistan
- Province: Balkh

Kumargah (Pashto: كمرگاه) is a gorge and mountain, 2,181 metres high, located in Balkh, Afghanistan.
