= Shrine of Khwaja Abu Nasr Parsa =

Mausoleum in Balkh, Afghanistan

Shrine of Khawaja Abu Nasr Parsa
- زیارت خواجه ابونصر پارسا
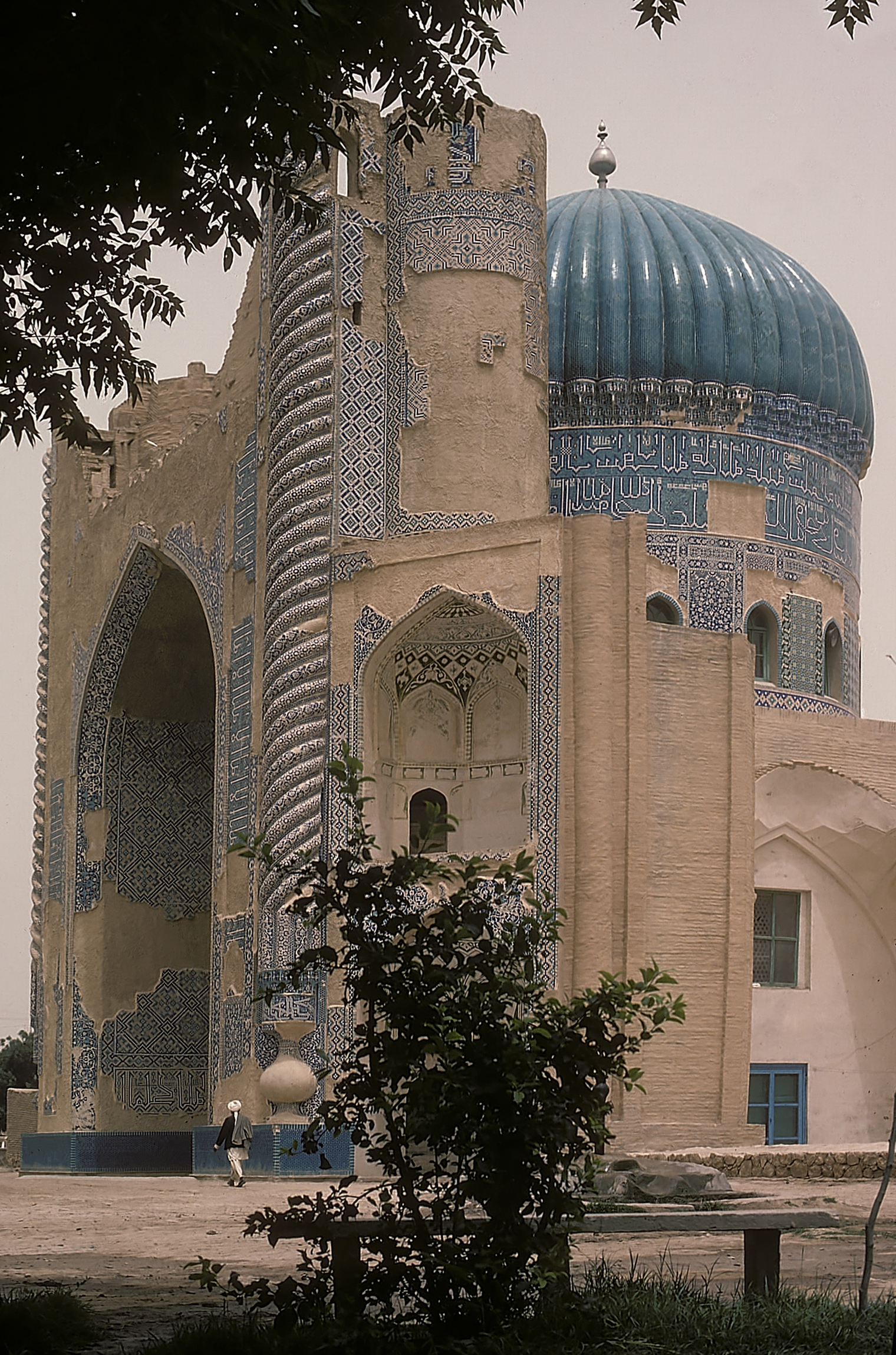
- The tomb of Khwaja Abu Nasr Parsa in the Green Mosque

- Location of the shrine in Afghanistan

Religion
- Affiliation: Sunni Islam
- Rite: Sufism (Naqshbandi)
- Ecclesiastical or organisational status: Mausoleum

Location
- Location: Balkh
- Country: Afghanistan
- Interactive map of Shrine of Khawaja Abu Nasr Parsa
- Coordinates: 36°45′30″N 66°53′48″E

Architecture
- Type: Islamic architecture
- Completed: 15th century CE

Specifications
- Dome: 1
- Shrine: 1: Khwaja Abu Nasr Parsa

The Shrine of Khawaja Abu Nasr Parsa (Persian: زیارت خواجه ابونصر پارسا, romanized: Ziyarat-i Khwajah Abu Nasr Parsa) is a mausoleum dedicated to the Naqshbandi mystic and religious teacher, Khwaja Abu Nasr Parsa, located in Balkh, Afghanistan. Today it is part of the Green Mosque complex.

== History ==
Khwaja Abu Nasr Parsa died in 1461, and later on a mausoleum was erected over his grave by the Timurid general, Mir Mazid Arghun. Yet some sources state it to be the Timurid ruler Mir Jalal al-Din Farid Arghun. The mausoleum and the adjoining mosque were renovated by the Shaybanid governor Abdul-Mo'min bin Abdullah Khan in the late 16th century.

Local tradition maintains that the tomb of the Khwaja is outside the main entrance iwan of the building. However, upon excavation of a crypt below the building, an unmarked tomb was discovered. Researchers identified this grave as that of Khwaja Abu Nasr Parsa.

In modern times, the site fell into disrepair during the Soviet-Afghan war.

== Architecture ==
The plan of the shrine is a chambered square enveloping a cross-shaped dome chamber aligned with the qibla along the southwest-northeast axis. Its elevation is outshadowed by the monumental portal screen and dome. Eight openings allow light to enter the dome, but some of them have cracked, revealing the inner structure of the dome. The dome has a base of muqarnas and the bottom part is covered with floral designs and ceramic tiles. Underneath the dome chamber, underground, there is a crypt containing an unmarked tomb, said to be that of Abu Nasr Parsa. A column was added later to support the crown of the crypt vault.

== See also ==
- Sufism in Afghanistan
- List of mosques in Afghanistan
