= Khwaja Abu Nasr Parsa =

15th-century Balkhi Sufi Muslim saint

Abu Nasr Parsa
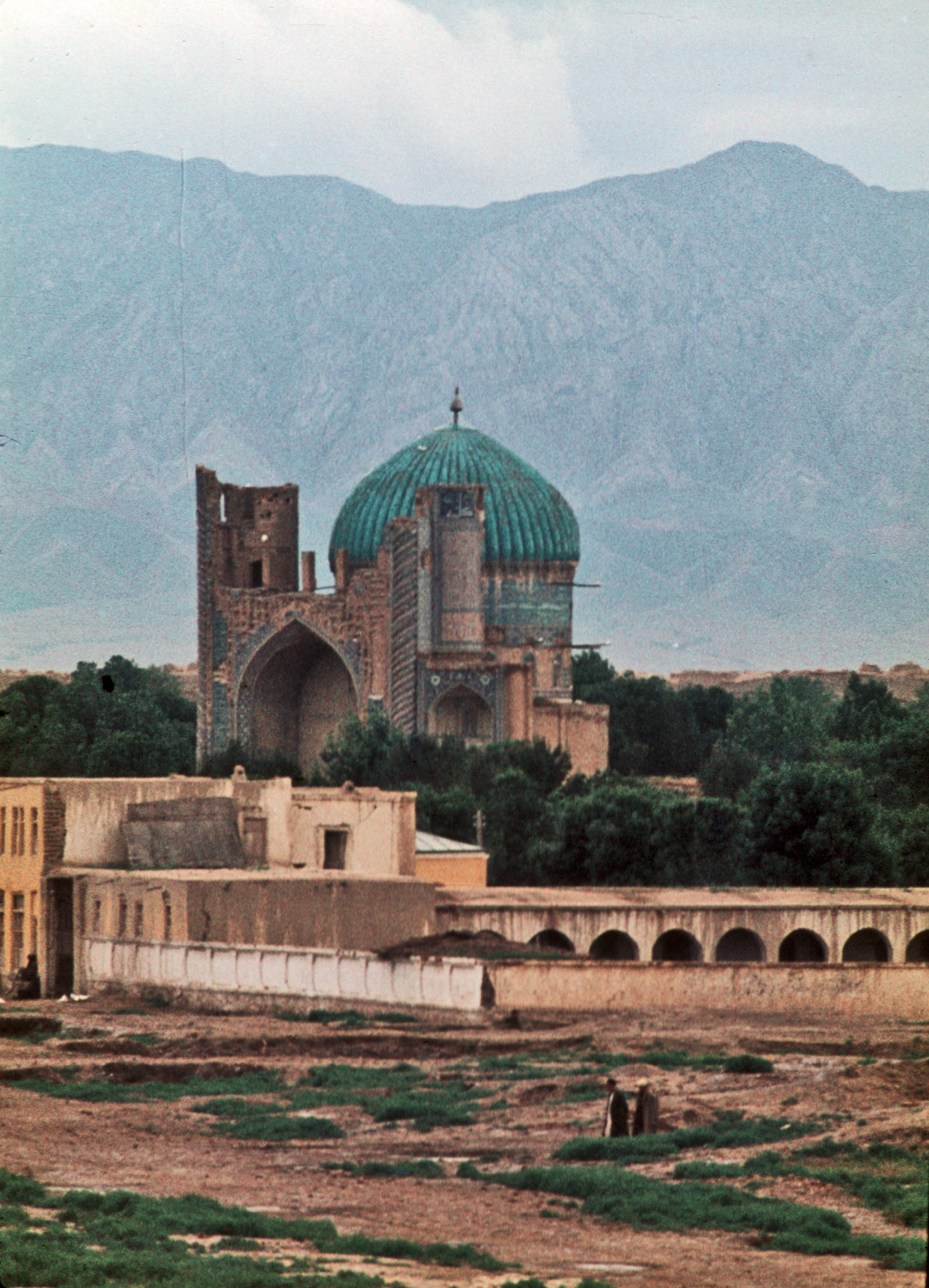
- The Green Mosque which contains the Shrine of Khwaja Abu Nasr Parsa
- Venerated in: Naqshbandi Sufi Order
- Major shrine: Shrine of Khwaja Abu Nasr Parsa, Green Mosque, Balkh, Afghanistan
- Influences: Muhammad Parsa (father)
- Influenced: Later Naqshbandi mystics

Khwaja Abu Nasr Parsa was a 15th century Sufi mystic of the Naqshbandi Sufi order. He died in 1461 at Balkh, where his tomb now stands in the complex of the Green Mosque. He was the son of Muhammad Parsa, the disciple and successor to Baha' al-Din Naqshband in the Naqshbandi spiritual chain. He left behind a legacy of descendants whom were also religious teachers.

== Sources ==
- Naushahi, Arif; Waley, M.I. (2015). "Abū Naṣr Pārsā". In Madelung, Wilferd; Daftary, Farhad (eds.). Encyclopaedia Islamica Online. Brill Online. ISSN 1875-9831.
