= Muzaffar Balkhi =

Indian Sufi saint (1320 – 1400)

Personal life
- Born: 1320
- Died: 1400

Religious life
- Religion: Islam
- Denomination: Sunni
- Jurisprudence: Hanafi

Muzaffar Shams Balkhi (1320 – 1400) also known as Hazrat Muzaffar Shams Balkhi, was an indian Sufi saint, spiritual leader, author and writer.

== Early life and education ==
He hailed from Balkh, which is now part of Afghanistan, and lived during the medieval period. After an education in Delhi, he joined his father in Bihar Sharif for further studies.

== Spiritual career ==
He was known for his teachings on mysticism, spirituality, and the Sufi path. He attracted disciples from various walks of life who were drawn to his wisdom and spiritual guidance. His teachings emphasized the inner journey of the soul towards divine union and the importance of love, compassion, and devotion in achieving spiritual enlightenment.

Like many Sufi saints of his time, his life and teachings have been preserved through oral traditions, hagiographies, and Sufi literature. He is revered by many Sufi orders and continues to be venerated by followers of Sufism in the region.
