= Kako, Bihar =

Kako کاکو
- Location in Bihar, India Kako (India)
- Coordinates: 25°13′0″N 85°4′0″E
- Country: India
- State: Bihar
- District: Jehanabad
- Elevation: 60 m (200 ft)

Population (2011)
  - Total: 23,037

Languages
  - Official: Hindi, Urdu
- Time zone: UTC+5:30 (IST)
- PIN: 804418
- Telephone code: 06114
- ISO 3166 code: IN-BR
- Vehicle registration: BR-25
- Nearest city: Jehanabad
- Lok Sabha constituency: Jehanabad

Kako is a town in Jehanabad district of Bihar, a state in northeastern India. Until 1984, Kako was a part of the Gaya district. In 2010, the town's state representation was shifted from the Jehanabad constituency to the Ghosi constituency of Bihar's Vidhan Sabha (legislative assembly). Though the population density is very high, the basic infrastructure is not optimal.

== Demographics ==
Kako is located in the Jehanabad district, Bihar state. Kako has a population of 3,554 families, with 23,037 people in all: 11,890 male, 11,147 are female (as of the 2011 census). Children under the age of 6 make up 18.08% of the total population (around 4165 children). In 2011, the literacy rate of Kako was 67.22% compared to 61.80% in the state. In Kako, literacy for males stands at 76.77%, above female at 57.02%.

== Geography ==
Kako is located at an elevation of 60 metres (200 ft). Temperatures vary from 5 to 45 °C (41 to 113 °F). The climate ranges from very hot in summer to very cold in winter. The average annual rainfall is 1,074 millimetres (42.3 in), 90 percent of which comes from monsoons. The soil is very fertile, known locally as Kemal.

National Highway 110 passes through Kako. The closest airport is Patna and Gaya, and the closest railway station is 8 km (5.0 mi) away at Jehanabad.

=== Agriculture ===
Most of the people of Kako depend on agriculture. The main crops are rice, wheat and pulses (a type of legume harvested for its dry seed). The land is very fertile, and there are ponds useful to agriculture. Some people are also engaged in vegetable farming.

== Tourism ==
- Bibi Kamal – This tomb is situated 2 km (1.2 mi) from Kako, holding the remains of a revered Muslim woman, Bibi Kamal Sahiba. Bibi Kamal's Urs takes place in November every year when cooked rice with milk " Kheer " is distributed among devotees seeking her blessings.
- Sun temple – The Sun temple draws many locals to Kako during the Vedic festival of Chatth Puja.
- Barabar Caves – These rock-cut caves are 22 km (14 mi) from Kako. The Archaeological Survey of India has petitioned UNESCO for the inclusion of Barabar hills in the world heritage list of monuments.
- Nalanda – Famous for "KUND" of Sufi saint Makhdoom Sharfuddin Yahya Maneri R.A. and a Buddhist tourist attraction in Rajigir, 57 or 67 km (35 or 42 mi) from Kako.
- Bodh Gaya – This Buddhist pilgrimage site is 73 km (45 mi) from Kako.

== See also ==
- Ata Kakwi, Indian poet, born in Kako
