= Balkh =

Town in northern Afghanistan

Balkh بلخ Bactra
- City
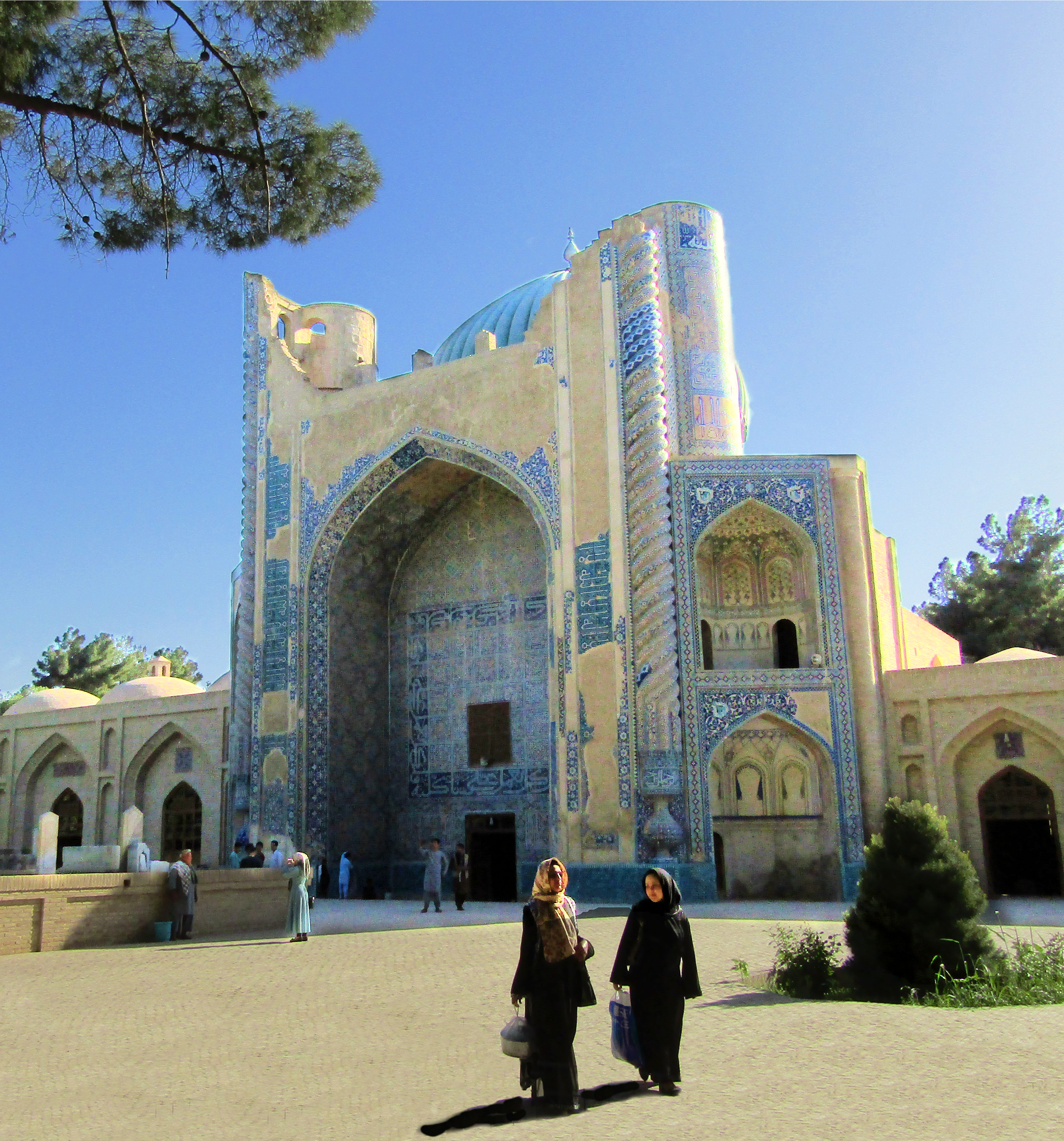
- Ruins of the Green Mosque of Balkh, 2018

- Location in Afghanistan
- Coordinates: 36°45′29″N 66°53′53″E
- Country: Afghanistan
- Province: Balkh
- District: Balkh

Government
  - Type: Municipality
  - Mayor: Maulvi Mohammad Qasim Fazal Subhan

Population (2025)
  - City: 148,972
  - Urban: 20,248
  - Rural: 128,724
- Time zone: UTC+04:30 (Afghanistan Time)
- ISO 3166 code: AF-BAL
- Climate: BSk

Balkh (Note: /bælx, bælk/; Pashto and Dari: بلخ; Bactrian: Βάχλο, romanized: Bákhlo; Ancient Greek: Βάκτρα, romanized: Báctra) is a city in northern Afghanistan, with an estimated population of 148,972 people. It is the second largest city of Balkh Province and is within the jurisdiction of Balkh District. Balkh is located approximately 24 km (15 mi) to the northwest of Mazar-i-Sharif and approximately 74 km (46 mi) to the south of the Amu Darya or the Afghanistan–Uzbekistan border.

Historically a hub of Zoroastrianism and Buddhism, the ancient city was also known to the ancient Persians as Zariaspa and to the ancient Greeks as Bactra, giving its name to the wider region of Bactria. Balkh was renowned as the capital of Bactria and later Tokharistan. Prior to the Mongol conquest, Balkh was one of the richest cities in Khorasan. It suffered severely due to the Mongol invasion in the 13th century and never recovered its former status, with nearby Mazar-i-Sharif slowly becoming the more important town in the locality. By the 14th century Balkh had become a part of Timurid Empire, and after the conquest by Shaybani Khan in 1506, continued to be ruled by the Uzbek dynasties for centuries, notably the Khanate of Bukhara and the Khanate of Kunduz, except for the brief Mughal and Afsharid interruptions, until it was captured by Dost Muhammad Khan in 1850 from the Uzbeks and incorporated into the Emirate of Afghanistan.

The Italian explorer and writer Marco Polo described Balkh as "a noble city and a great seat of learning". Most of the town now consists of ruined buildings, situated some 12 km (7.5 mi) from the right bank of the seasonally flowing Balkh River, at an elevation of about 365 m (1,198 ft). The Green Mosque of Balkh is one of the few surviving monuments.

While it is one of Afghanistan's ethnically diverse settlements, Tajiks account for the majority of Balkh's populace and have continuously inhabited the site for millennia. The main language of the town is Dari, which is spoken by a significant majority. Its current mayor is Maulvi Mohammad Qasim Fazal Subhan.

== Etymology ==
The origin of the name Balkh is unknown. Wilhelm Eilers proposed that the region was named after the Balkh River (in Greek transliteration Βάκτρος, Baktros) from underlying Bāxtri-, itself meaning 'she who divides', etymologically from the Proto-Indo-European root *bhag- 'to divide' (whence also Avestan bag- and Old Indic bháj-).

The Bactrian language name of the city was βαχλο, Bakhlo. In Middle Persian texts, it was named Baxl (Bakhl, Middle Persian: 𐭡𐭠𐭧𐭫). The name of the province or country also appears in the Old Persian inscriptions (B.h.i 16; Dar Pers e.16; Nr. a.23) as Bāxtri, (Bakhtri, Old Persian: 𐎲𐎠𐎧𐎫𐎼𐎡𐏁). It is written in the Avesta as Bāxẟi (Avestan: 𐬠𐬁𐬑𐬜𐬌) . From this came the intermediate form Bāxli, Sanskrit Bahlīka (also Balhika) for "Bactrian", and by transposition the modern Persian Balx / Balkh, and Armenian Bahl. This same root entered the Greek language as Baktra (Ancient Greek: Βάκτρα), often written in the form Bactra.

An earlier name for Balkh or a term for part of the city was Zariaspa (Ancient Greek: Ζαρίασπα), which may derive from the important Zoroastrian fire temple Azar-i-Asp or from a Median name *Ζaryāspa- meaning 'having gold-coloured horses'.

The nickname of Balkh is "the mother of all cities".

The Belgian-French explorer and spiritualist Alexandra David-Néel associated Balkh with Shambhala, a mythical kingdom that features prominently in ancient Tibetan Buddhism, and also offered the Persian Sham-i-Bala (lit. 'elevated candle') as an etymology of its name. In a similar vein, the British author John G. Bennett, whose academic focus was on the teachings of the Armenian-Greek mystic George Gurdjieff, speculated in his works that Shambhala may have been a Bactrian Sun temple called Shams-i-Balkh, taking note of the Afghan author and mystic Idries Shah as the source of this suggestion.

== History ==
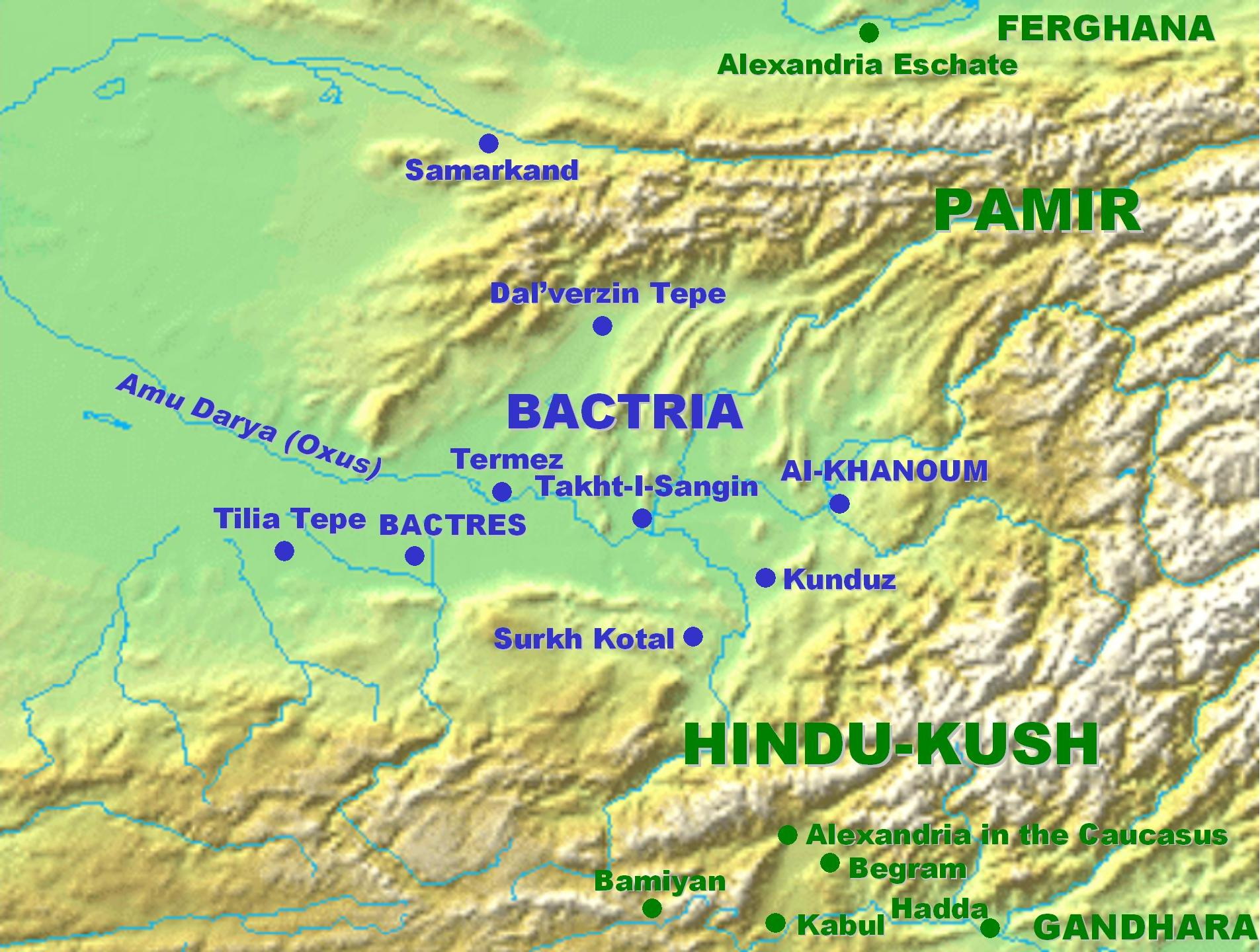
Map showing Balkh (here indicated as Bactres), the capital of Bactria during the Hellenistic Age

The first historical reference for Balkh is found in the Mahabharata, where it is called 'Valhika' through which an important trade route passed. The same source mentions that the place is famous for good breed of mules and was founded by merchants who traded in Chinese silk, pashmina, jewels and perfumes.

The defence tower of Bala Hissar, the massive earthen citadel at the heart of Balkh (ancient Bactria), Afghanistan. 2025.

Balkh was earlier considered to be the first city to which the ancient Iranic peoples moved from north of the Amu Darya (also known as the Oxus in Greek), between 2000 and 1500 BC. However, it was only recently that archaeological remains before 500 BC were found by French archaeologists led by Johanna Lhullier and Julio Bendezu-Sarmiento in the section called Bala Hissar, which is the citadel of the site. They dated this first settlement to the Early Iron Age (Yaz I period, c. 1500-1000 BC) continuing until pre-Achaemenid times (Yaz II period, c. 1000–540 BC). Bala Hissar is located at the north of the site and is oval in shape, having an area of around 1,500 by 1,000 m (c. 120 hectares) and to the south is the lower town. Another mound of the site, known as Tepe Zargaran, and the Northern Fortification Wall of Balkh, were occupied at a large extension in Achaemenid times (Yaz III period, c. 540-330 BC).

Since the Iranic people built one of their first kingdoms in Balkh, some scholars believe that it was from this area that different waves of Iranic tribes spread to north-east Iran and the Seistan region. The changing climate has led to desertification since antiquity, when the region was very fertile. Its foundation is mythically ascribed to Keyumars, the first king of the world in Persian legend; and it is at least certain that, at a very early date, it was the rival of Ecbatana, Nineveh, and Babylon.

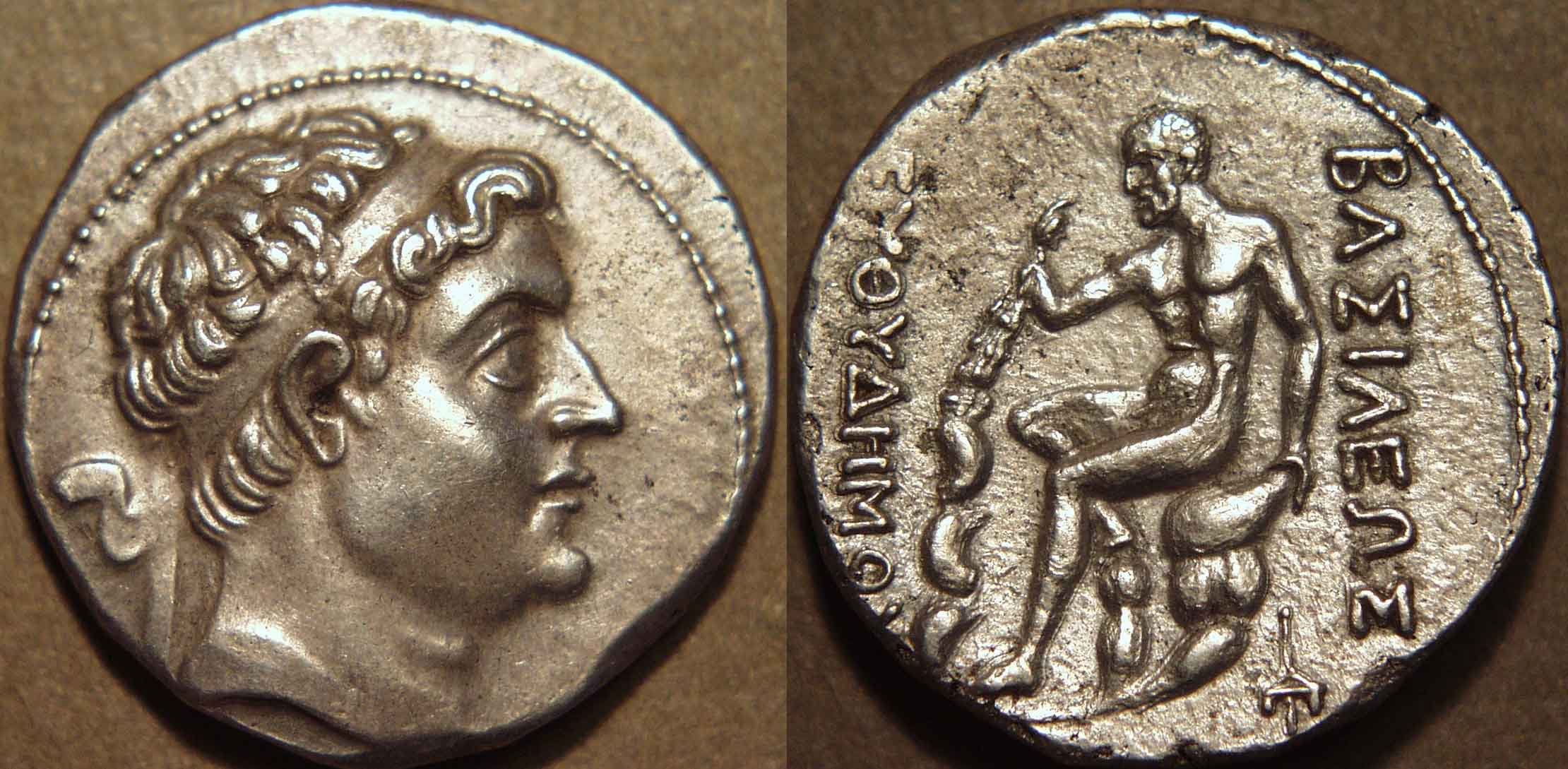
Silver coin of the Greco-Bactrian king Euthydemus I, one of the rulers of ancient Balkh, 3rd-2nd century BC.

The city was traditionally a center of Zoroastrianism. For a long time the city and country was the central seat of the dualistic Zoroastrian religion, the founder of which, Zoroaster, died within the walls according to the Persian poet Firdowsi. Armenian sources state that the Arsacid dynasty of the Parthian Empire established its capital in Balkh. There is a long-standing tradition that an ancient shrine of Anahita was to be found here, a temple so rich it invited plunder.

Alexander the Great married Roxana of Bactria after killing the king of Balkh in the 4th century BC, and introduced Greek culture and religion to the region. The city was one of the capitals of the Greco-Bactrian Kingdom and was besieged for three years by the Seleucid Empire under king Antiochus III the Great. After the demise of the Greco-Bactrian kingdom, it was ruled by Indo-Scythians, Parthians, Indo-Parthians, the Kushan Empire, Indo-Sassanids, Kidarites, the Hephthalite Empire, and Sassanid Persians before the arrival of the Arabs.

=== Ancient Bactrian religion ===
Bactrian documents – in the Bactrian language, written from the fourth to eighth centuries – consistently evoke the name of local deities, such as Kamird and Wakhsh, for example, as witnesses to contracts. The documents come from an area between Balkh and Bamiyan, which is part of Bactria.

=== Zoroastrianism and Buddhism ===
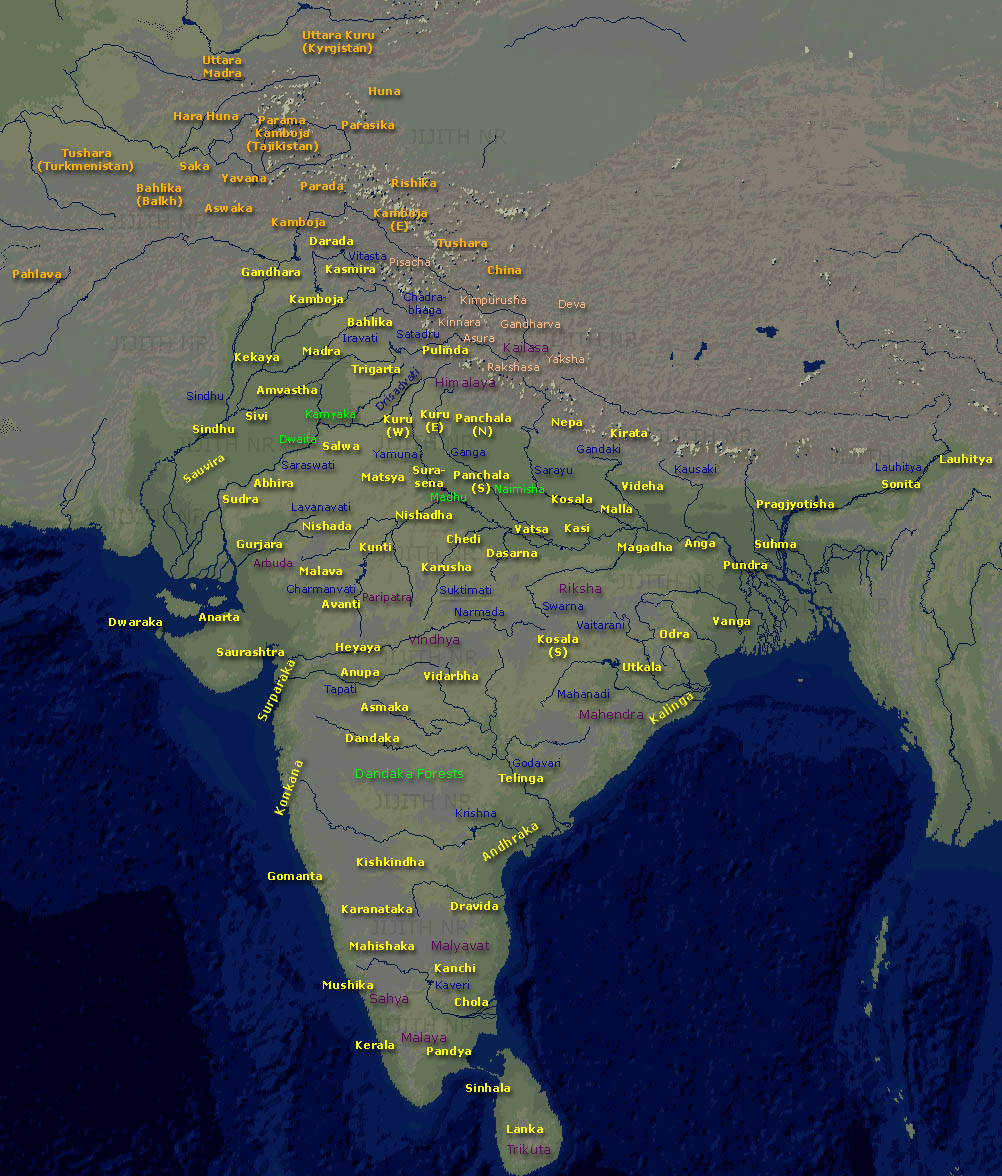
Bahlika Kingdom alongside other locations of kingdoms and republics mentioned in the Indian epics or Bharata Khanda.

Balkh is well known to Buddhists as the hometown of Trapusa and Bahalika, two merchants who, according to scripture, became Buddha's first disciples. They were the first to offer Buddha food after he attained enlightenment, and in return Buddha gave them eight of his hairs to remember him by. According to some accounts, Trapusa and Bahalika returned to Balkh, and built two stupas in the way Buddha instructed. Balkh is therefore named after Bahalika, who is credited with introducing Buddhism to the city. This is reflected in literature, where the town has been called Balhika, Bahlika or Valhika. The first Buddhist monastery (vihara) at Balkh was built for Bahalika when he returned home after becoming a Buddhist monk.

The Chinese pilgrim Faxian (337-422 CE) traveled to the region in the early 5th century, and found Hinayana Buddhism prevalent in Shan Shan, Kucha, Kashgar, Osh, Udayana, and Gandhara. Later, the Chinese monk Xuanzang (602–664 CE) visited Balkh in 630 CE, when it was a flourishing centre of Hinayana Buddhism. According to his account at the time of his visit, there were about a hundred Buddhist convents, 3,000 monks, and a large number of stupas and other religious monuments in the city or its vicinity. Xuanzang also remarked that Buddhism was widely practiced by the Hunnish rulers of Balkh, who were descended from Indian royal stock.

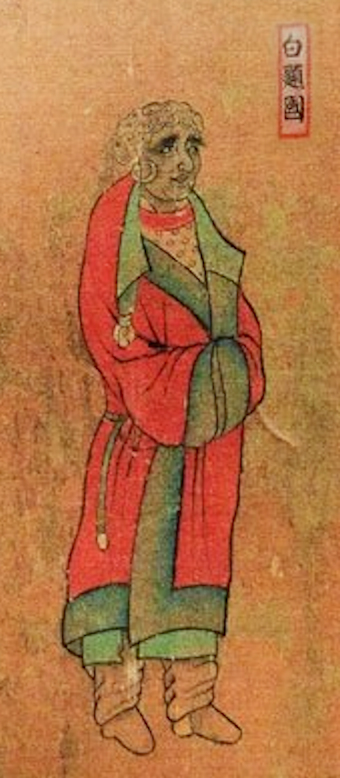
An ambassador from Balkh (白題國 Baitiguo) to the Tang dynasty, Wanghuitu (王會圖), circa 650 CE.

During the 8th century, the Korean monk and traveler Hyecho (704–787 CE) recorded that even after the Arab invasion, the residents of Balkh continued to practice Buddhism and followed a Buddhist king. He noted that the king of Balkh at the time had fled to nearby Badakshan.

The most remarkable Buddhist monastery was the Nava Vihara ("New Temple"), which possessed a gigantic statue of Gautama Buddha. Located near the city of Balkh, it served as a pilgrimage centre for political leaders who came from far and wide to pay homage to it. Shortly before the Arab conquest, the monastery became a Zoroastrian fire-temple. A curious reference to this building is found in the writings of the geographer Ibn Hawqal, an Arab traveler of the 10th century, who describes Balkh as built of clay, with ramparts and six gates, and extending for half a parasang. He also mentions a castle and a mosque.

A large number of Sanskrit medical, pharmacological, and toxicological texts were translated into Arabic under the patronage of Khalid al-Barmaki, the vizier of al-Mansur. Khalid was the son of a chief priest of a Buddhist monastery. Some of the family were killed when the Arabs captured Balkh; others including Khalid survived by converting to Islam. They would later come to be known as the Barmakids of Baghdad.

=== Judaism ===
Sennacherib, who reigned over the Neo-Assyrian Empire from 705 to 681 BCE, is said to have forcibly transferred some Israelites to Balkh after dispossessing them from the Kingdom of Israel during the Assyrian captivity. This account is discussed in the works of the Egyptian historian al-Maqrizi, who wrote that the arrival and establishment of the Jews in Balkh had occurred in light of Sennacherib's campaign in the Levant. Additionally, a number of geographers from the Arab world attested the existence of a monument called Bāb al-Yahūd (lit. 'Gate of the Jews') and a settlement called al-Yahūdiyya at the site of Balkh. Some Muslims believe that the Israelite prophet Jeremiah fled to Balkh during the Babylonian captivity and that the Israelite prophet Ezekiel was buried there, though Jews revere Ezekiel's Tomb in modern-day Iraq as the site of his final resting place.

Balkh's Jewish community was further noted in the Ghaznavid Empire during the 11th century, when Jews were forced to maintain a garden for Mahmud of Ghazni and pay a minority tax of 500 dirhams. According to Jewish oral history, under Timur of the Timurid Empire, the Jews of Balkh were given a gated city quarter of their own to live in.

There was still a substantial Jewish community in Balkh as late as 1885, as attested by the British administrator Charles Yate following the Second Anglo-Afghan War: "a considerable colony of Jews, who have a separate quarter of the village to themselves, and appeared, so far as we could judge, to be fair-looking men with most unmistakably Jewish features."

Hiwi al-Balkhi, a 9th-century exegete and Bible critic, was born in Balkh and is widely believed to have been a Bukharan Jew, at least by ethnicity, as some scholars have asserted that he was a practicing gnostic Christian.

=== Arab conquests and Islamization ===
At the time of the Islamic conquest of Persia in the 7th century, Balkh was an outpost of resistance and a safe haven for the Persian emperor Yazdegerd III who fled there from the armies of the Rashidun Caliph, Umar. Later, in the 9th century, during the reign of Ya'qub bin Laith as-Saffar, Islam became firmly rooted in the local population.

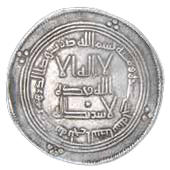
A silver dirham of the Umayyad Caliphate, minted at Balkh al-Baida in AH 111 (=729/30 CE).

Arabs first occupied Persia in 642 (during the Caliphate of Uthman, 644–656 CE). Attracted by the grandeur and wealth of Balkh, they attacked it in 645 CE but did not maintain control for long. In 653 Arab commander al-Ahnaf raided the town again and compelled it to pay tribute. The Arab hold over the town, however, remained tenuous and the area was reconquered by the Umayyad Caliph Muawiya, in 663 AD. Prof. Upasak describes the effect of this conquest in these words:

"The Arabs plundered the town and killed the people indiscriminately. It is said that they raided the famous Buddhist shrine of Nava-Vihara, which the Arab historians call 'Nava Bahara' and describe it as one of the magnificent places, which comprised a range of 360 cells around the high stupas'. They plundered the gems and jewels that were studded on many images and stupas and took away the wealth accumulated in the Vihara but probably did no considerable harm to other monastic buildings or to the monks residing there".

These early Arab attacks had little effect on the normal ecclesiastical life in the monasteries or Balkh Buddhist population outside. Buddhism continued to flourish with their monasteries as the centres of Buddhist learning and training. Scholars, monks and pilgrims from China, India and Korea continued to visit this place. Several revolts were made against the Arab rule in Balkh.

The Arabs' control over Balkh did not last long as it soon came under the rule of a local prince, a zealous Buddhist called Nezak Tarkhan. He expelled the Arabs from his territories in 670 or 671. He is said to have not only reprimanded the Chief Priest (Barmak) of Nava-Vihara but beheaded him for embracing Islam. Per another account, when Balkh was conquered by the Arabs, the head priest of the Nava-Vihara had gone to the capital and became a Muslim. This displeased the people of the Balkh. He was deposed and his son was placed in his position.

Nazak Tarkhan is also said to have murdered not only the Chief Priest but also his sons. Only a young son was saved. He was taken by his mother to Kashmir where he was given training in medicine, astronomy and other sciences. Later they returned to Balkh. Prof. Maqbool Ahmed observes:

"One is tempted to think that the family originated from Kashmir, for in time of distress, they took refuge in the Valley. Whatever it be, their Kashmiri origin is undoubted and this also explains the deep interest of the Barmaks, in later years, in Kashmir, for we know they were responsible for inviting several scholars and physicians from Kashmir to the Court of Abbasids."

Prof. Maqbool also refers to the descriptions of Kashmir contained in the report prepared by the envoy of Yahya bin Barmak. He surmises that the envoy could have possibly visited Kashmir during the reign of Samgramapida II (797–801). Reference has been made to sages and arts.

The Arabs managed to bring Balkh under their control once again in 715 CE, in spite of strong resistance offered by the people of Balkh during the Umayyad period. Qutayba ibn Muslim al-Bahili, an Arab General, was governor of Khurasan and the east from 705 to 715. He established a firm hold over the lands beyond the Oxus for the Arabs. He fought and killed Nazak Tarkhan in Tokharistan (Bactria) in 715. In the wake of Arab conquest, the resident monks of the Vihara were either killed or forced to abandon their faith. The Viharas were razed to the ground. Priceless treasures in the form of manuscripts in the libraries of monasteries were consigned to ashes.

Only portions of the ancient wall of the town remain from this conquest and Nava-Vihara stands in ruins, near Takhta-i-Rustam.

In 726, the Umayyad governor of Khurasan, Asad ibn Abdallah al-Qasri, rebuilt Balkh and installed an Arab garrison. In his second governorship, a decade later, he transferred the provincial capital there.

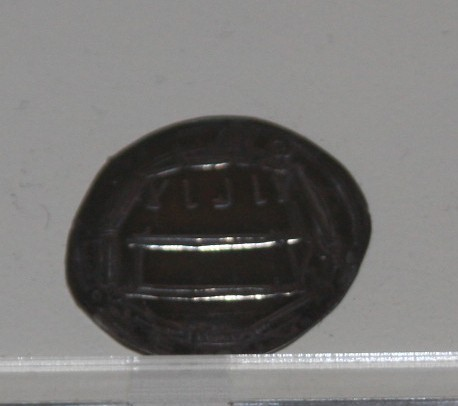
A dirham of the Abbasid Caliphate minted in Balkh

The Umayyad period lasted until 747, when Abu Muslim captured it for the Abbasids (the subsequent Sunni Caliphate dynasty) during the Abbasid Revolution. The city remained in Abbasid hands until 861 when control of the caliphate as a whole weakened during the period known as the Anarchy at Samarra.

==== Iranic and Turkic dynasties ====
In 870, Ya'qub ibn al-Layth al-Saffar rebelled against Abbasid rule and founded the Saffarid dynasty at Sistan. He captured most of present-day Afghanistan and Iran. His successor Amr ibn al-Layth, tried to capture Transoxiana from the Samanids, who were nominally vassals of the Abbasids, but he was defeated and captured by Ismail Samani at the Battle of Balkh in 900. He was sent to the Abbasid Caliph as a prisoner and executed in 902. The power of Saffarids greatly diminished and they became vassals of the Samanids. Thus Balkh now passed to them.

Samanid rule in Balkh lasted until 997, when their former subordinates, the Ghaznavids, captured it. In 1006, Balkh was captured by Karakhanids, but the Ghaznavids recaptured it 1008. Finally, the Seljuks conquered Balkh in 1059. In 1115, it was occupied and looted by irregular Oghuz Turks. Between 1141 and 1142, Balkh was captured by Atsiz, Shah of Khwarezm, after the Seljuks were defeated by the Kara-Khitan Khanate at the Battle of Qatwan. Ahmad Sanjar decisively defeated a Ghurid army, commanded by Ala al-Din Husayn and he took him prisoner for two years before releasing him as a vassal of the Seljuks. The next year, he marched against rebellious Oghuz Turks from Khuttal and Tukharistan. But he was defeated twice and was captured after a second battle in Merv. The Oghuzs looted Khorasan after their victory.

Balkh was nominally ruled by Mahmud Khan, the former khan of Western Karakhanids, but the real power was held by Muayyid al-Din Ay Aba, amir of Nishabur for three years. Sanjar finally escaped from captivity and returned to Merv through Termez. He died in 1157 and control of Balkh passed to Mahmud Khan until his death in 1162. It was captured by Khwarezmshahs in 1162, by the Kara Khitans in 1165, by the Ghurids in 1198 and again by Khwarezmshahs in 1206.

Muhammad al-Idrisi, in the 12th century, speaks of its possessing a variety of educational establishments, and carrying on an active trade. There were several important commercial routes from the city, stretching as far east as India and China. The late 12th-century local chronicle The Merits of Balkh (Fada'il-i-Balkh), by Abu Bakr Abdullah al-Wa'iz al-Balkhi, states that a woman known only as the khatun (lady) of Davud, from 848 appointed governor of Balkh, had taken over from him with "particular responsibility for the city and people" while he was busy building himself an elaborate pleasure palace called Nawshǎd (New Joy).

=== Mongol conquest and destruction ===
In 1220 during the Mongol invasion of the Khwarazmian Empire, Genghis Khan sacked Balkh, massacred its inhabitants and levelled all the buildings capable of defence – treatment to which it was again subjected in the 14th century by Timur. Notwithstanding this, however, Marco Polo (probably referring to its past) could still describe it as "a noble city and a great seat of learning." For when Ibn Battuta visited Balkh around 1333 during the rule of the Kartids, who were Tajik vassals of the Persia-based Mongol Ilkhanate until 1335, he described it as a city still in ruins: "It is completely dilapidated and uninhabited, but anyone seeing it would think it to be inhabited because of the solidity of its construction (for it was a vast and important city), and its mosques and colleges preserve their outward appearance even now, with the inscriptions on their buildings incised with lapis-blue paints."

It was not reconstructed until 1338. It was captured by Tamerlane in 1389 and its citadel was destroyed, but Shah Rukh, his successor, rebuilt the citadel in 1407.

=== 16th to 19th centuries ===
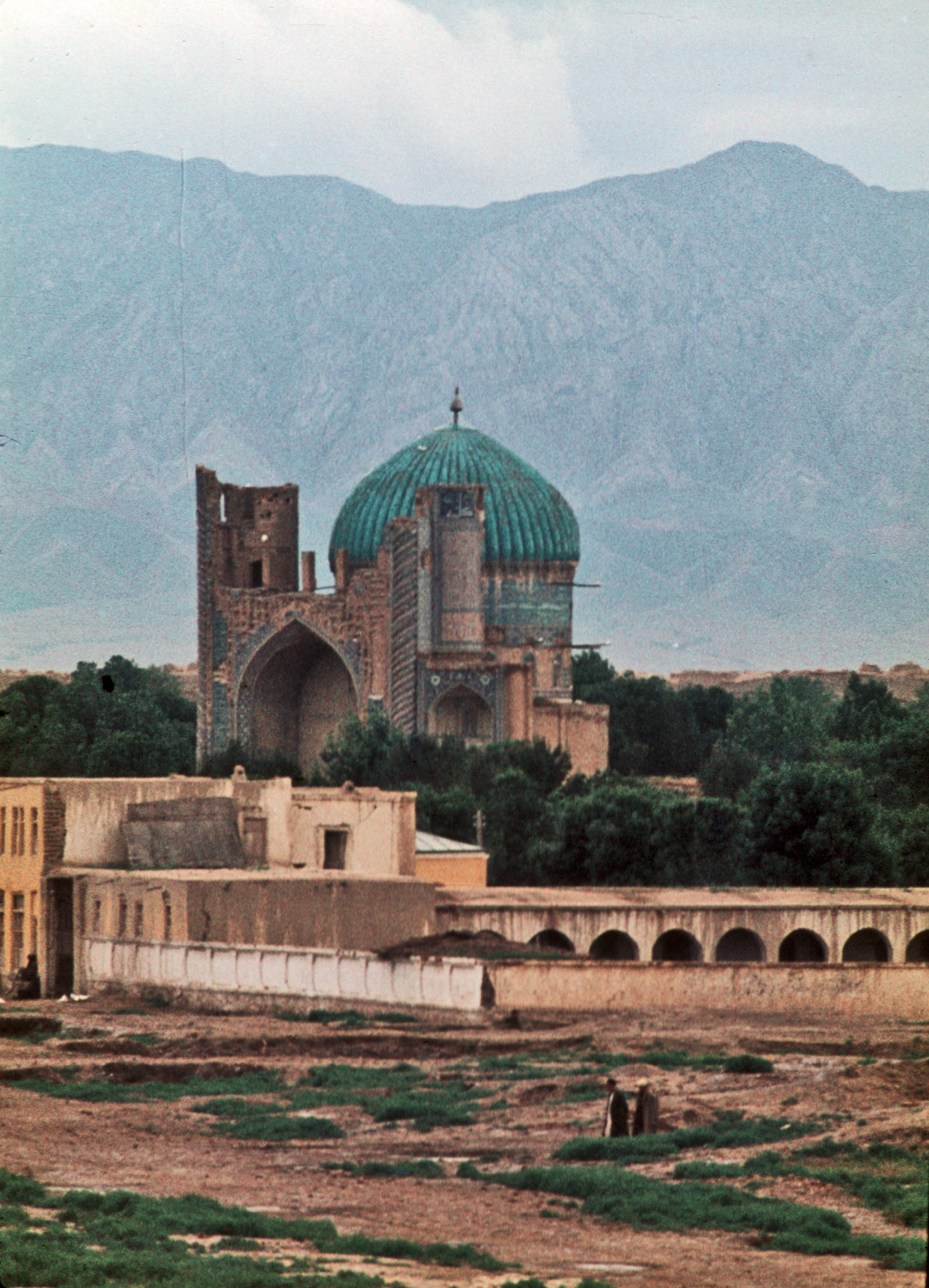
The Green Mosque of Balkh

In 1506 Uzbeks entered Balkh under the command of Muhammad Shaybani. They were briefly expelled by the Safavids in 1510. Babur ruled Balkh between 1511 and 1512 as a vassal of the Persian Safavids. But he was defeated twice by the Khanate of Bukhara and was forced to retire to Kabul. Balkh was ruled by Bukhara except for Safavid rule between 1598 and 1601.

The Mughal Emperor Shah Jahan fruitlessly fought them there for several years in the 1640s. Nevertheless, Balkh was ruled by the Mughal Empire and turned into a subah (imperial top-level province) in 1646 by Shah Jahan, only to be lost in 1647, just like the neighboring Badakhshan Subah. Balkh was the government seat of Aurangzeb in his youth. In 1736 it was conquered by Nader Shah. After his assassination, local Uzbek Haji Khan declared the independence of Balkh in 1747, under the Maimana Khanate. The area of Balkh was governed by the Uzbek Qataghan dynasty, with its capital in Khulm, for the majority of the early nineteenth century, and only nominally acknowledged Kabul's suzerainty. During this time, the Qataghan dynasty also competed with Bukhara in inter dynastic conflicts throughout the area. Only through the conquests of the Emirate of Kabul's Dost Mohammad Khan in the 1850s (see also; Afghan Conquest of Balkh), followed by those of Abdur Rahman Khan in 1888, did the region of "little Turkestan" to the south of the Amu Darya (also known as Oxus River) become a permanent part of Afghanistan. By 1885, Charles Yate reported that the city was "nothing but a vast ruin" and that there were no more than 500 houses, occupied mostly by "Afghan settlers" and with "very few Usbegs" (i.e. Uzbeks).

In 1866, after a malaria outbreak during the flood season, Balkh lost its administrative status to the neighbouring city of Mazar-i-Sharif (Mazār-e Šarīf), about 20 km (12 mi) southeast of Balkh.

=== 20th and 21st centuries ===
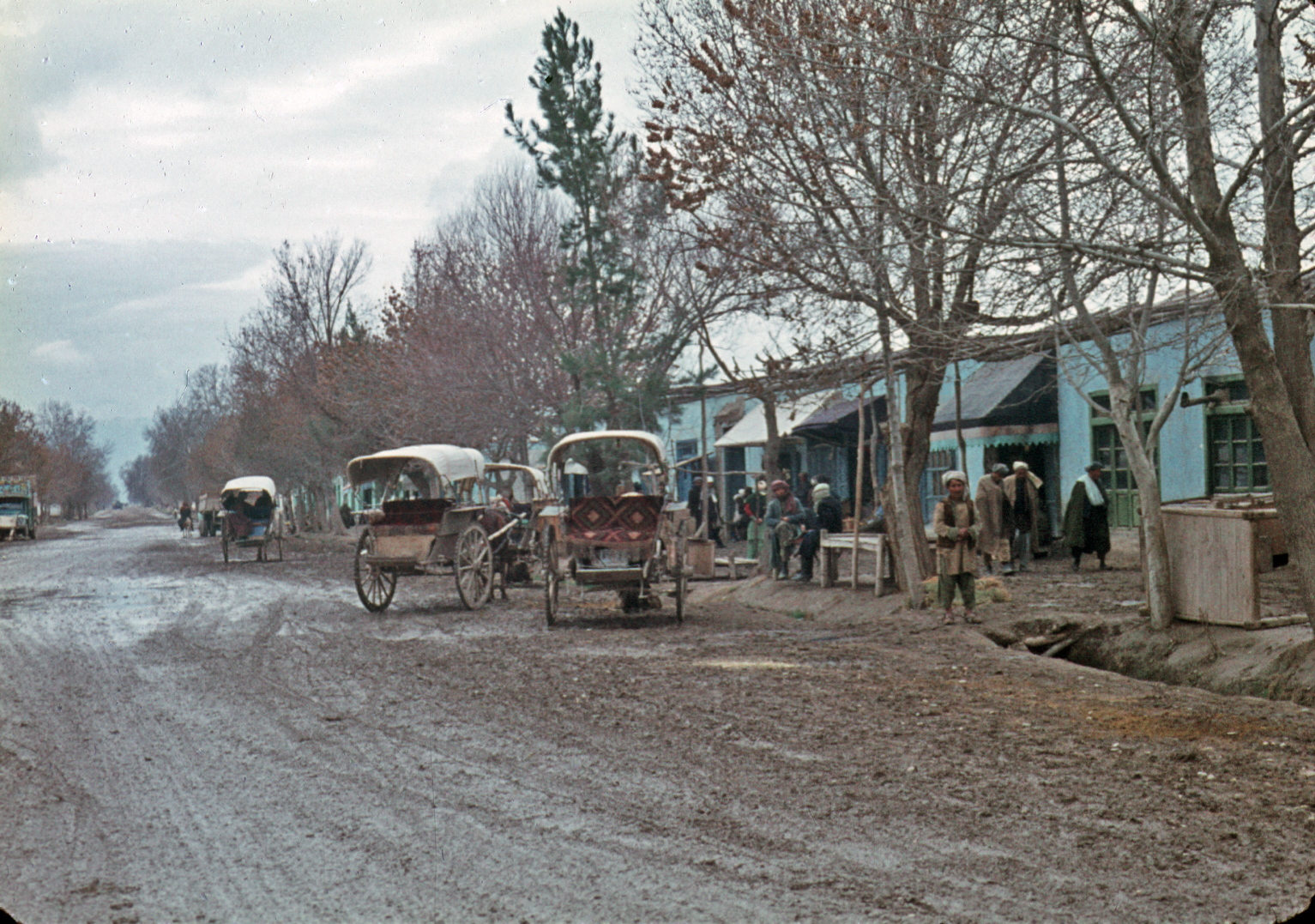
A street in Balkh with several horse carts, c. 1970s

In 1911 Balkh comprised a settlement of about 500 houses of Afghan settlers, a colony of Jews and a small bazaar set in the midst of a waste of ruins and acres of debris. Entering by the west (Akcha) gate, one passed under three arches, in which the compilers recognized the remnants of the former Green Mosque (Persian: جَامع مَسجد, romanized: Jama‘ Masjid, Friday Mosque). The outer walls, mostly in utter disrepair, were estimated about 6.5–7 miles (10.5–11.3 km) in perimeter. In the south-east, they were set high on a mound or rampart, which indicated a Mongol origin to the compilers.

The fort and citadel to the north-east were built well above the town on a barren mound and were walled and moated. There was, however, little left of them but the remains of a few pillars. The Green Mosque (Persian: مَسجد سَبز, romanized: Masjid Sabz), named for its green-tiled dome (see photograph top right corner) and said to be the tomb of the Khwaja Abu Nasr Parsa, had nothing but the arched entrance remaining of the former madrasah (Arabic: مَـدْرَسَـة, school).

The town was garrisoned as of 1911 by a few thousand irregulars (kasidars), the regular troops of Afghan Turkestan being cantoned at Takhtapul, near Mazari Sharif. The gardens to the north-east contained a caravanserai that formed one side of a courtyard, which was shaded by a group of chenar trees Platanus orientalis.

A project of modernization was undertaken in 1934, in which eight streets were laid out, housing and bazaars built. Modern Balkh is a centre of the cotton industry, of the skins known commonly in the West as "Persian lamb" (Karakul), and for agricultural produce like almonds and melons.

The site and the museum have suffered from looting and uncontrolled digging during the 1990s civil war. After the Taliban's fall in 2001 some poor residents dug in an attempt to sell ancient treasures. The provisional Afghan government said in January 2002 that it had stopped the looting.

== Archaeological sites ==
=== Ancient Buddhist ===
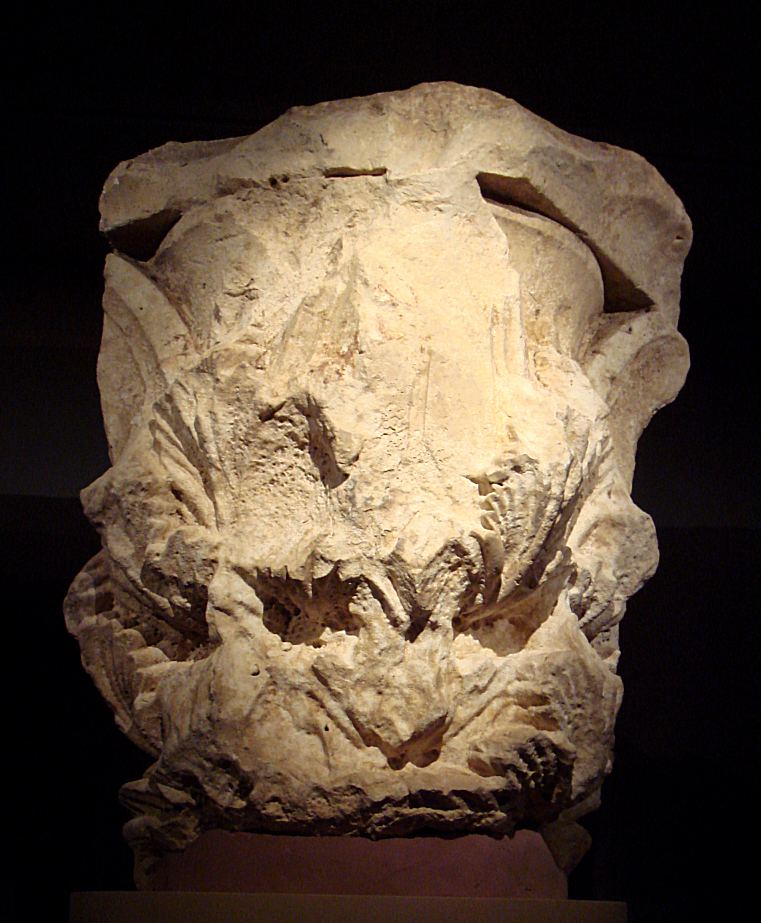
Remains of a Hellenistic Corinthian capital found in Balkh.

The earlier Buddhist constructions have proved more durable than the Islamic buildings. The Top-Rustam is 46 m (50 yd) in diameter at the base and 27 m (30 yd) at the top, circular and about 15 m (49 ft) high. Four circular vaults are sunk in the interior and four passages have been pierced below from the outside, which probably lead to them. The base of the building is constructed of sun-dried bricks about 60 cm (2.0 ft) square and 100 to 130 mm (3.9 to 5.1 in) thick. The Takht-e Rustam is wedge-shaped in plan with uneven sides. It is apparently built of pisé mud (i.e. mud mixed with straw and puddled). It is possible that in these ruins we may recognize the Nava Vihara described by the Chinese traveller Xuanzang. There are the remains of many other topes (or stupas) in the neighbourhood.

The mounds of ruins on the road to Mazar-e Sharif probably represent the site of a city yet older than those on which stands the modern Balkh.

=== Medieval Islamic ===
Numerous places of interest are to be seen today aside from the ancient ruins and fortifications:

- The madrasa of Sayed Subhan Quli Khan.
- Bala-Hesar, the shrine and mosque of Khwaja Nasr Parsa.
- The tomb of the poet Rabi'a Balkhi.
- The Nine Domes Mosque (Masjid-e Noh Gonbad). This exquisitely ornamented mosque, also referred to as Haji Piyada, is the earliest Islamic monument yet identified in Afghanistan.
- Tepe Rustam and Takht-e Rustam

=== Displays at the Balkh Museum ===
The museum was formerly the second largest museum in the country, but its collection has suffered from looting in recent times.

The museum is also known as the Museum of the Blue Mosque, from the building it shares with a religious library. As well as exhibits from the ancient ruins of Balkh, the collection includes works of Islamic art including a 13th-century Quran, and examples of Afghan decorative and folk art.

== Demographics ==
The city of Balkh has an estimated population of 148,972 people. Listed as the 16th largest city in Afghanistan, unofficial 2024 estimates had set its population at around 114,883 people. In Balkh province, the ethnic groups of Tajiks, Uzbeks, Hazaras,Pashtun, Sayed/Sadat, Turkmens, and Arabs reside.

== Notable people ==
Balkh had a major role in the development of the Persian language and literature. The early works of Persian literature were written by poets and writers who were originally from Balkh. Many famous Persian poets came from Balkh. Furthermore, the city was a cultural centre for science and had notable scientists working in or originating from that region.

=== Poets ===
- Abu-Shakur Balkhi – 10th-century Persian poet.
- Abul Moayyad Balkhi – 10th-century Persian poet.
- Abu Ali Balkhi – Author of a Shah-nama, according to Biruni.
- Rabi'a Balkhi – 10th-century Persian poet and the first woman poet in Persian literature.
- Abu Mansur Muhammad Ibn Ahmad Daqiqi – 10th-century Persian poet; Balkh is one of his suggested birthplaces.
- Ma'ruf Balkhi – 10th-century Persian poet, one of the earliest to compose poems in New Persian.
- Sani Balkhi – 10th-century Persian Rubaʿi poet.
- Unsuri Balkhi – 10th/11th-century Persian poet at the court of the Ghaznavids.
- Manuchihri Damghani – 11th-century Persian royal poet at the Ghaznavid court, possibly born in Balkh according to Dawlat Shah Samarkandi.
- Rashid al-Din Vatvat – 11th-century Persian secretary, poet, and philologist.
- Anvari – 12th-century Persian poet and scientist, regarded as one of the most significant figures in Persian literature; lived and died in Balkh.
- Mawlānā Jalal ad-Din Rūmī Balkhi – 13th-century Persian poet, one of the most famous and influential Persian writers, born in Balkh.
- Amir Khusraw (Dehlavi) – 13th-century Persian-writing poet of medieval India whose father, Amir Saifuddin, was from Balkh.
- Fasihuddin Balkhi – 20th-century Indian author and historian with ancestral ties to Balkh.
- Wasef Bakhtari – Contemporary Afghan poet, literary figure, and intellectual known for introducing She'r-e Nimaa'i ("Nimaic poetry") to Afghan-Persian literature; born in Balkh.

=== Scientists ===
- Abu Ma'shar al-Balkhi – 8th-century Persian astrologer, astronomer, and philosopher, considered a major astrologer of the Abbasid court in Baghdad.
- Abu Zayd al-Balkhi – 9th-century Persian polymath: geographer, mathematician, physician, and psychologist; pioneer in mental health concepts.
- Abu Ali al-Husayn ibn Abd Allah ibn Sina al-Balkhi al-Bukhari or Avicenna – 10th/11th-century philosopher and scientist, regarded as the father of early modern medicine; his father, Abdullah, was from Balkh.
- Ali ibn Yusuf al-Ilaqi – 11th-century Persian physician and student of Avicenna, practiced in Balkh.
- Al-Isfizari – 12th-century Khorasani mathematician who worked in Balkh.
- Ibn Balkhi – 12th-century Iranian historian and author of Fārs-Nāma.

=== Politicians ===
- Khalid ibn Barmak – 8th-century wazir of the Abbasid Caliphate and member of the prominent Barmakid family.
- Harthama ibn A'yan – 8th-century Abbasid military commander and governor of Khurasan.

==== Monarchs ====
- Vishtaspa – Ancient king of Balkh and early supporter of Zoroaster.
- Diodotus I – Greek king who ruled in Balkh in the 3rd century BC.
- Saman Khuda – Founder of the Samanid dynasty, born near Balkh.
- Sabuktigin – Founder of the Ghaznavid dynasty, who died in Balkh.
- Timur – 14th-century conqueror who founded the Timurid Empire; crowned in Balkh.

=== Religious figures ===
- Zoroaster, ancient prophet traditionally associated with Balkh by some scholars
- Muqatil ibn Sulayman Al-Balkhi, 8th-century story teller of the Quran, wrote one of the earliest, if not first, commentaries (tafsir) of the Qur'an
- Ibrahim ibn Adham Balkhi, 8th century Sufi saint and reputedly ruler of Balkh, one of the most prominent of the early ascetic Sufi saints.
- Hiwi al-Balkhi, 9th century Bukharan Jewish exegete and Biblical critic
- Abu l-Jaysh al-Balkhi, 10th century Twelver Shiite theologian and Muhaddith
- Shahid Balkhi 10th century Persian theologian, philosopher, poet and sufi
- Abdullah, father of Avicenna and respected Ismaili scholar
- Muhammad ibn Husayn al Khatibi al Balkhi also known as Baha al-Din Walad, father of Rumi (Balkhi) and respected theologian, jurist and mystic from Balkh
- Mawlānā Jalal ad-Din Rūmī Balkhi – 13th-century Persian poet, one of the most famous and influential Persian writers, born in Balkh.
- Sultan Balkhi, a 16th-century Muslim saint, associated with the spread of Islam in Bengal

== See also ==
- List of cities in Afghanistan
- Nava Vihara
- Kumargah
- Mount Imeon
- Silk Road transmission of Buddhism
