= Fasihuddin Balkhi =

Indian author and historian (1885–1962)

Sayyid Fasihuddin Balkhi
- فصیح الدین بلخی
- Born: Syed Fasihuddin Balkhi; 10 February 1885; Bakhshi Muhalla, Patna City
- Died: 14 March 1962 (aged 77)
- Other name: Fasihuddin Balkhi Azimabadi
- Education: Calcutta University
- Occupations: Writer, Historian

Fasihuddin Balkhi (10 February 1885 – 14 March 1962) was an Indian author and historian. He belonged to the Khanqah Balkhia Firdausia, Fatuha, Patna. He was a contemporary of Ata Kakwi, Taqi Rahim, Shad Azimabadi and Shah Mohsin Danapuri. He was an active participant in the Non-cooperation Movement. His works include "Tarikh-e-Magadh", "Tazkira-e-Hindu Shora-e-Bihar" and "Wahabi Movement."

== Early life ==
Fasihuddin Balkhi was born as Syed Fasihuddin Balkhi at Bakhshi Muhalla, Patna City on 10 February 1885. He was brother of Azizuddin Balkhi.

== Scholarly works ==
- Balkhi, Fasihuddin (1983). Wahabi Movement. Classical Publishing Company. ISBN 978-81-7054-013-7.
- Balkhi, Fasihuddin (1993). Patna inscriptions (in Urdu). K̲h̲udā Bak̲h̲sh Oriyanṭal Pablik Lāʼibrerī.
- Golden Jadeed Farsi Translation Wa Composition
- Balkhi, Fasihuddin (1962). Tazkira-e-Hindu Shora-e-Bihar (in Urdu). Daltanganj Palamu: National Book Center.
- Balkhi, Fasihuddin (2001). Tareekhe-Magadh: Suba-e-Bihar Ki Muqammal Tareekh, 642-1943 (in Urdu). Khuda Baksh Oriental Library.
- Balkhi, Fasihuddin. Golden Jadeed Farsi Translation Wa Composition (in Urdu). Patna: Iqbal Publishing House.
- Balkhi, Fasihuddin (1956). Tazkira-e-Niswan-e-Hind (in Urdu). Patna: Shamsi Press.
- Inshad-e-Shad
- Aasaar-e-Balkhia
- Aasaar-e-Qadima
- Dastoor-e-Sukhan
- Ilm-e-Nujoom

== Notes ==
=== Bibliography ===
- Balḵẖī, Muẓaffar (1988). Faṣīhuddīn Balḵẖī: ḥayāt aur kārnāme [Fasihuddin Balkhi: Life and Achievements] (in Urdu). Sabzi Bagh, Patna: The Azad Press.
- Hussain, Syed Abbas (2015). Idraak Gopalpur: Fasiḥuddīn Balkhī Number (in Urdu). zer-i ihtimām, Markaz-i Taḥqīqāt-i Urdū va Fārsī.
