= List of female monarchs =

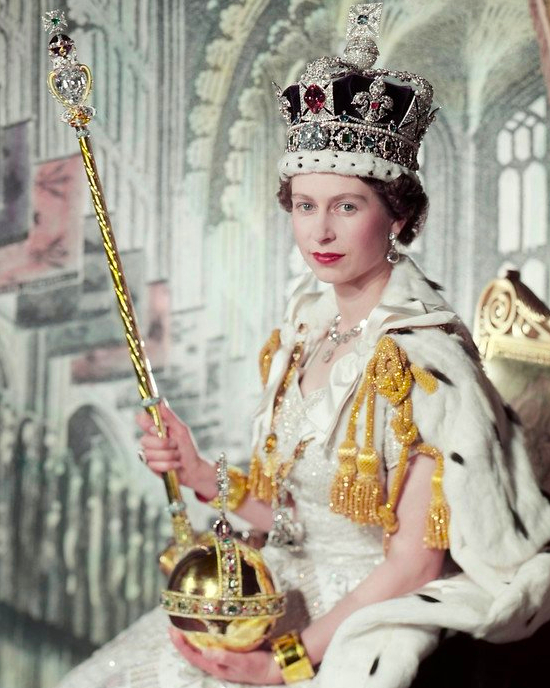
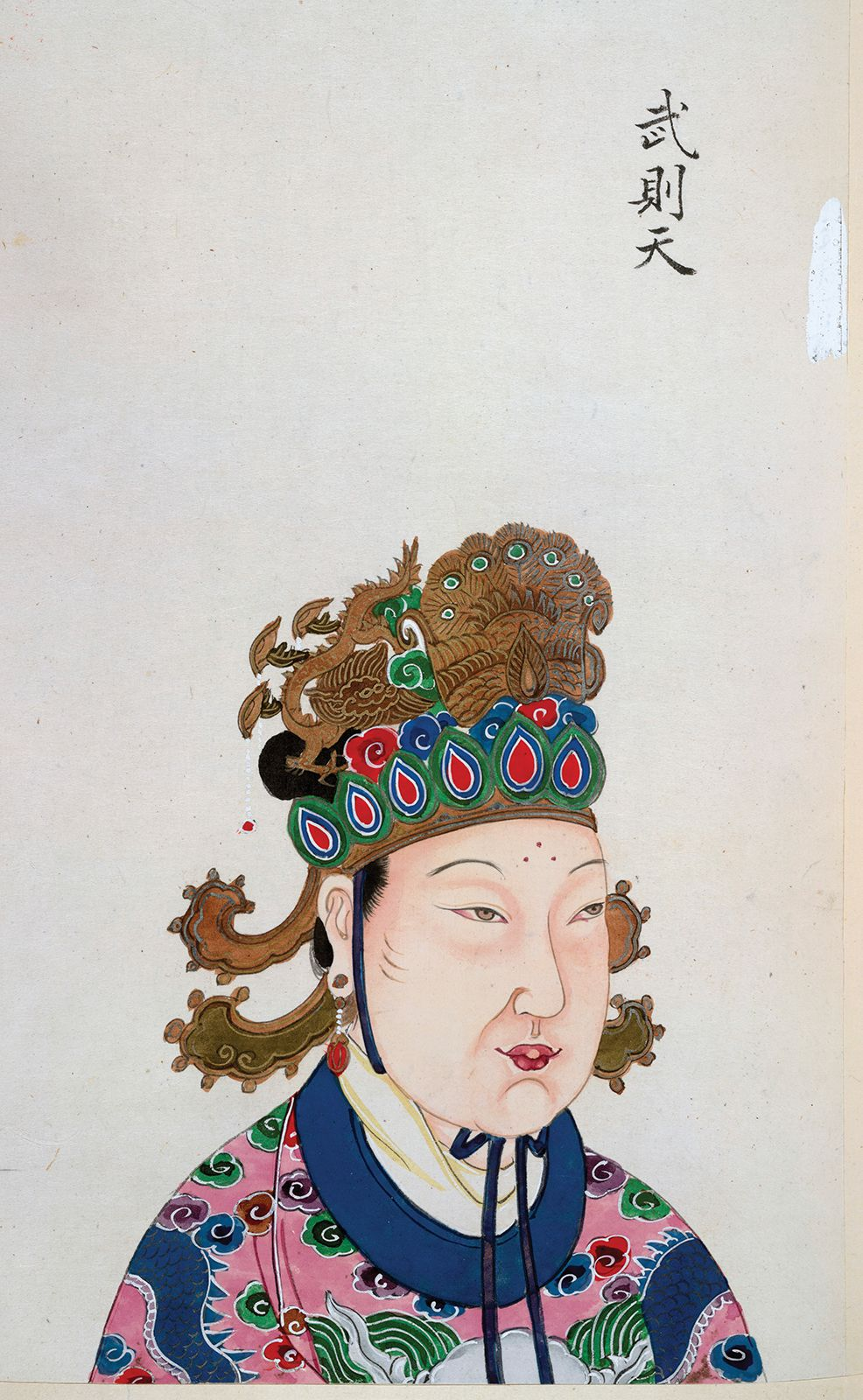
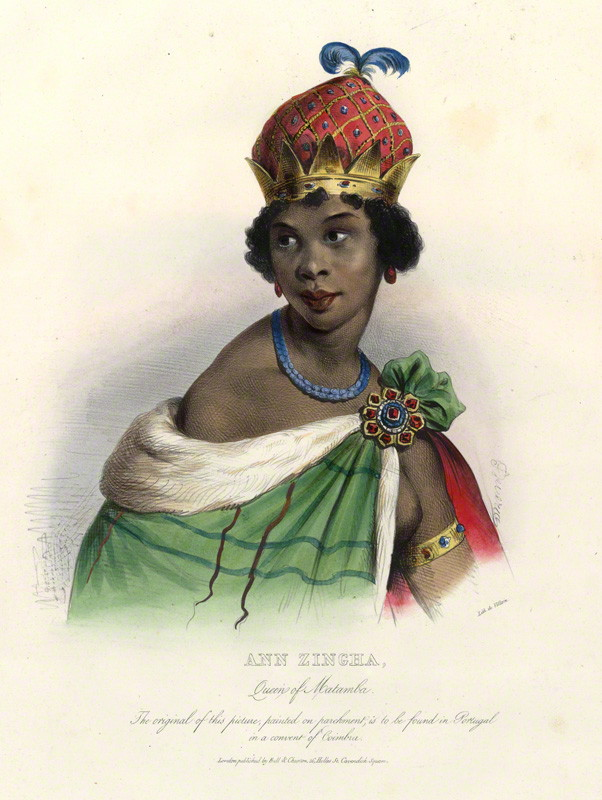
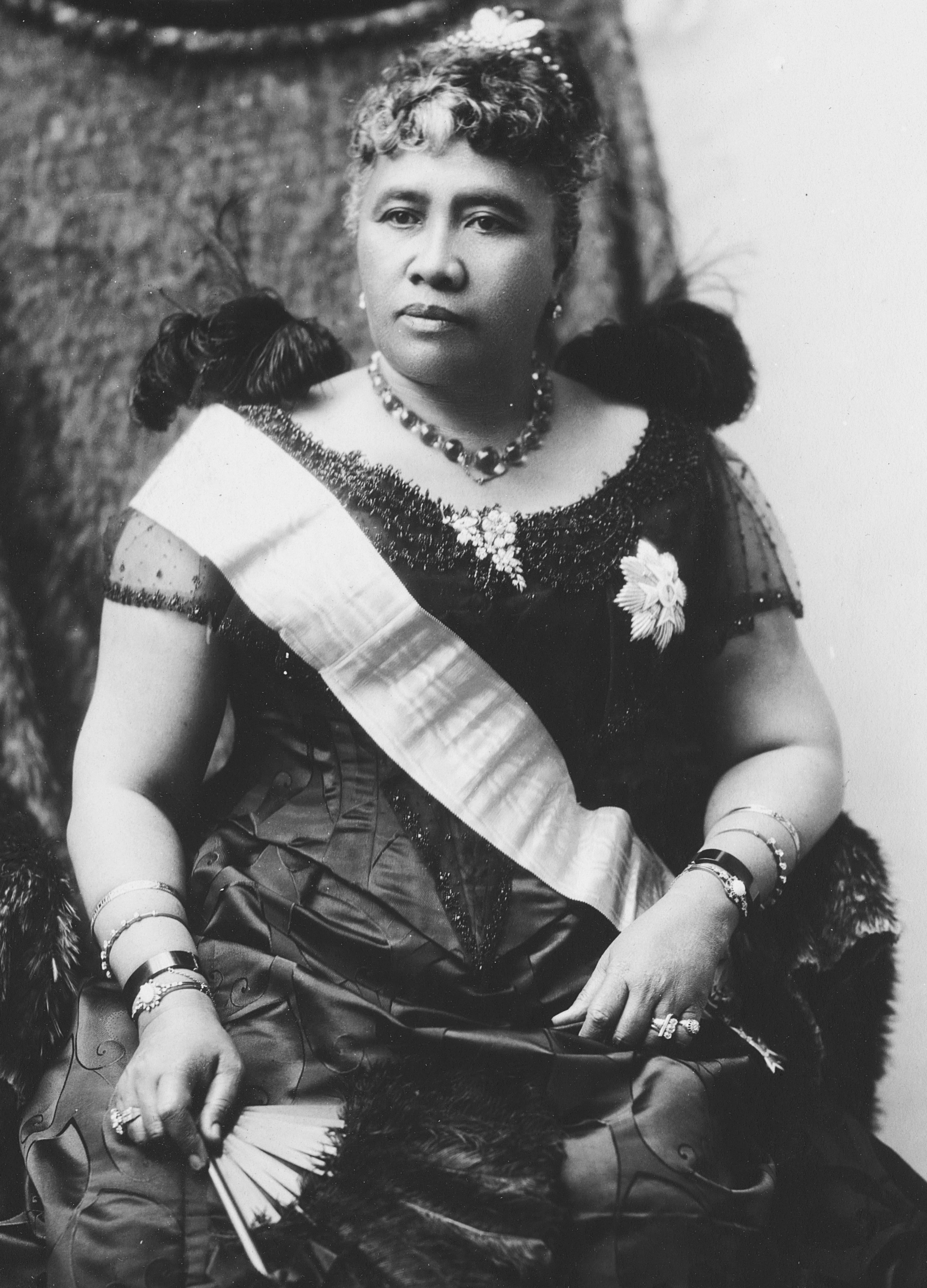
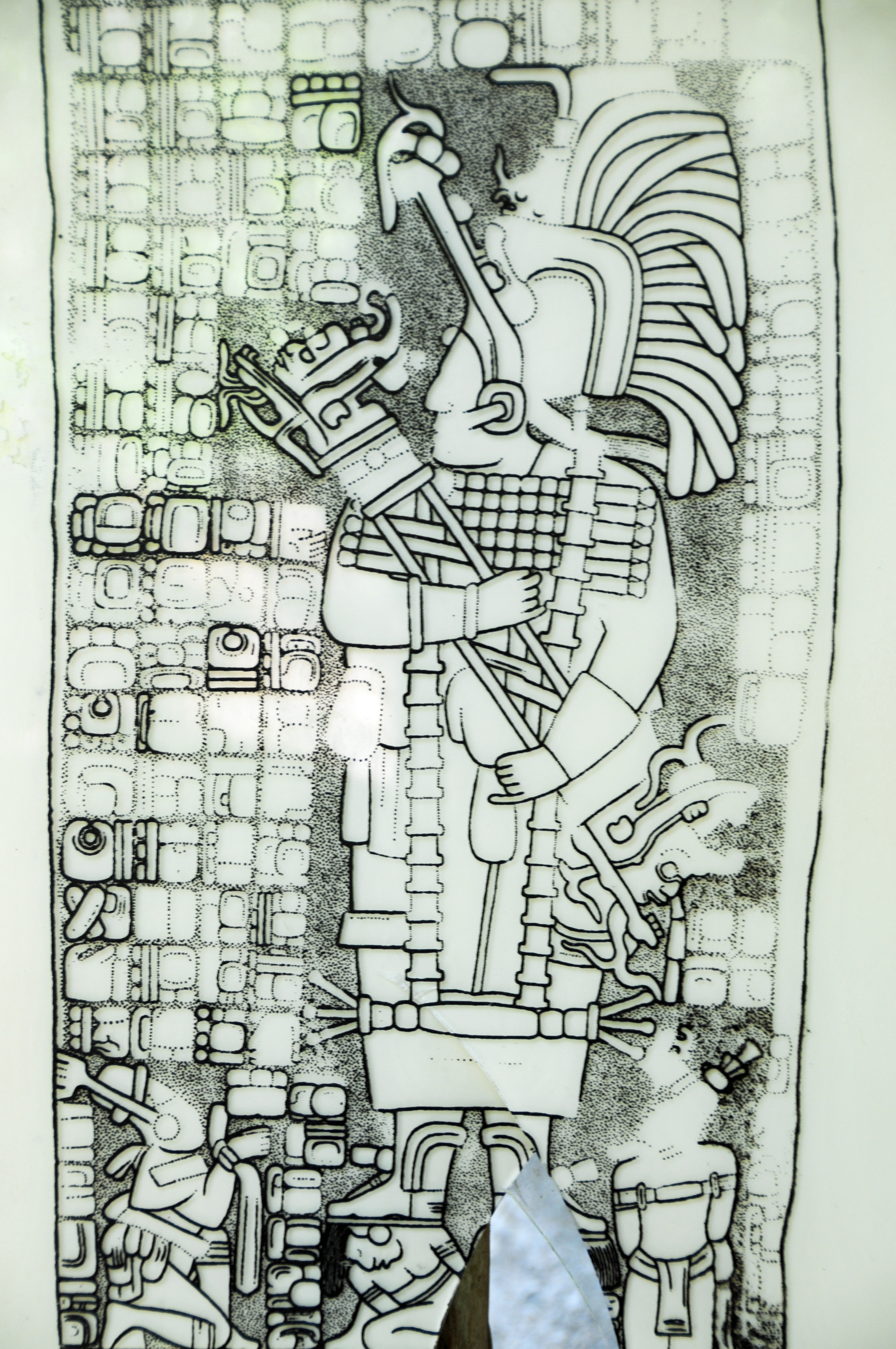
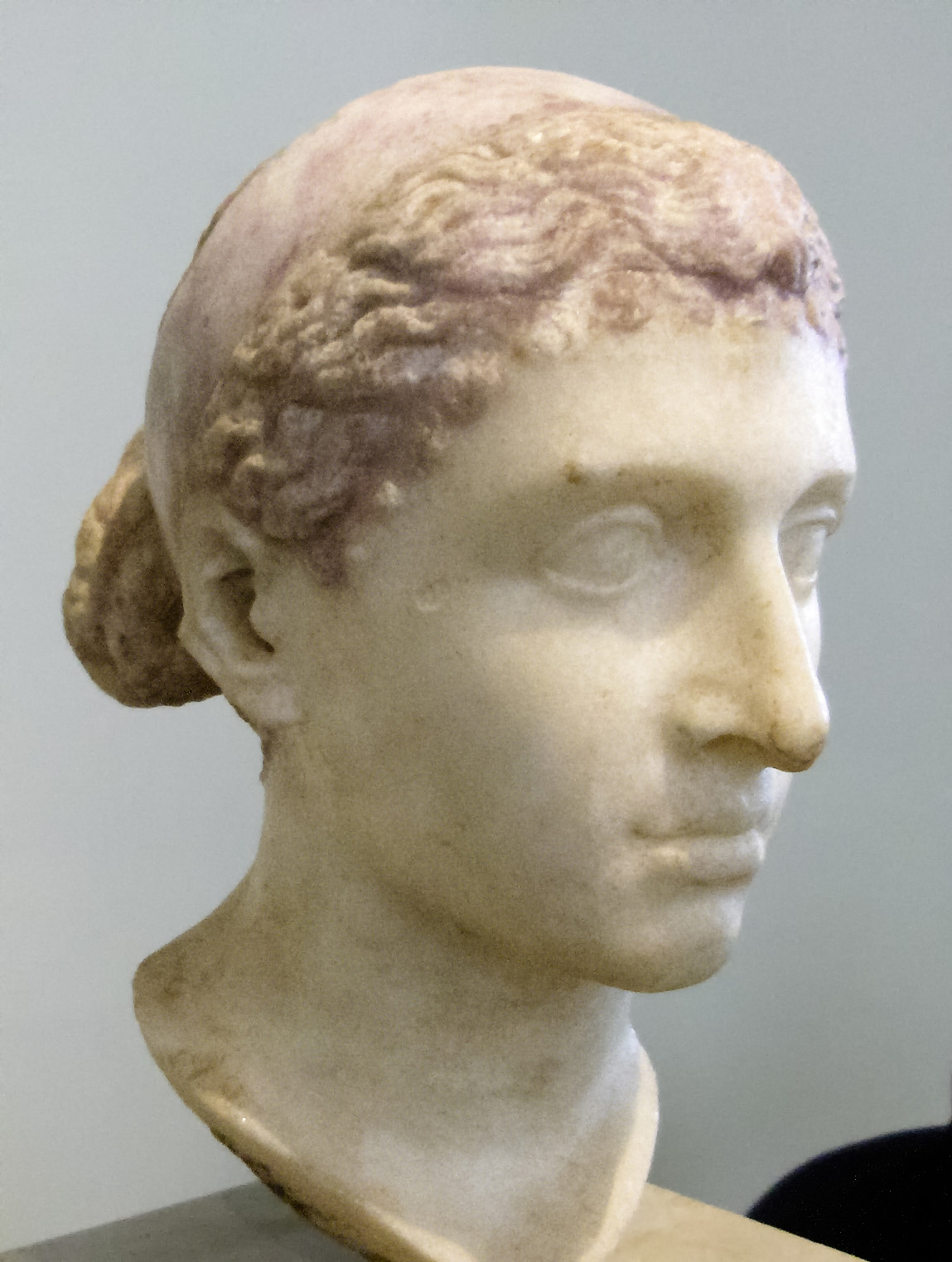
- Top left: Elizabeth II was the longest-reigning verified female monarch, reigning as Queen of the United Kingdom for 70 years, from 1952 to 2022. (Europe)
- Top right: Wu Zetian, who reigned from 690 to 705, was the only undisputed female imperial monarch in the history of the Chinese Empire. (Asia)
- Middle left: Nzinga ruled the kingdoms of Ndongo and Matamba in the 17th century, leading resistance against Portuguese colonization. (Africa)
- Middle right: Liliʻuokalani was the last sovereign of the Hawaiian Kingdom, ruling from 1891 to 1893 before the kingdom was overthrown. (Oceania)
- Bottom left: Lady Kʼawiil Ajaw was the Queen of Cobá in the 7th century. Her reign took place during a golden age for Cobá. (Americas)
- Bottom right: Cleopatra VII was the last active Pharaoh of Egypt and notable for her relationship with Julius Caesar. (Middle East)

This is a list of current and former female monarchs regardless of title, including queens regnant, empresses regnant, pharaohs and monarchs by other titles (grand duchess, princess, etc.). Consorts, such as queens consort (i.e. spouses of male monarchs) are not included, see list of current consorts of sovereigns. Female regents are not included; see list of regents.

The following is an incomplete list of women monarchs who are well known from popular writings, although many ancient and poorly documented ruling monarchs (such as those from Africa and Oceania) are omitted. Section 1 lists monarchs who ruled in their own right, such as queens regnant. Section 2 lists legendary monarchs. Section 3 lists monarchs who ruled in their own right, but had no official legal recognition while in power. Section 4 lists various female rulers who were referred to with the title "Chieftainess". Regents, such as queens regent, are not monarchs and are not included here. The lists do include claimants and anti-rulers whose recognition among their subjects and legitimacy as monarchs are disputed.

== Independent or autonomous monarchs ==
=== Africa ===
==== North Africa ====
===== Algeria =====
| Monarch | Portrait | Office | State | Reign dates | Length | Ref. |
|---|---|---|---|---|---|---|
| Cleopatra Selene II | | Queen | Mauretania | 25–5 BC | 20 years | |
| Tin Hinan | | Queen | Hoggar | 4th century AD | Unknown | |
| Dihya | | Queen | Kingdom of the Aurès | c. 668–703 AD | c. 35 years | |

===== Canary Islands =====
The Canary Islands are a Spanish territory in North Africa.

| Monarch | Portrait | Office | State | Start of reign | End of reign | Length | Ref. |
|---|---|---|---|---|---|---|---|
| Inés Peraza (Note: She reigned until 1502, but titled herself queen only until 1477.) | – | Queen | Lordship of the Canary Islands | 1452 | 1477 | 25 years | |
| Isabella I of Castile (Note: The title of "King/Queen of the Canary Islands" was included in the list of titles and honours of the Spanish Crown.) | | Queen | Kingdom of the Canary Islands | 4 September 1479 | 26 November 1504 | 25 years, 83 days | |
| Joanna of Castile | | Queen | Kingdom of the Canary Islands | 26 November 1504 | 12 April 1555 | 50 years, 137 days | |
| Isabella II of Spain | | Queen | Kingdom of the Canary Islands | 29 September 1833 | 30 November 1833 | 62 days | |

===== Egypt =====
The first verified female monarch of Egypt is Sobekneferu of the Twelfth dynasty. However, queens from earlier periods such as Neithhotep, Merneith and Khentkaus I held powerful positions and may have ruled Egypt in their own right, but the archaeological evidence is ambiguous.

| Monarch | Portrait | Office | State | Start of reign | End of reign | Length | Ref. |
|---|---|---|---|---|---|---|---|
| Sobekneferu | | Pharaoh | Middle Kingdom of Egypt | c. 1777 BC | c. 1773 BC | 3 years, 10 months and 24 days | |
| Hatshepsut | | Pharaoh | New Kingdom of Egypt | c. 1479 BC (Note: As regent; declared Pharaoh between Year 2 and 7 of her regency.) | c. 1458 BC | c. 21 years (de facto); 14–19 years (de jure) | |
| Neferneferuaten | | Pharaoh | New Kingdom of Egypt | c. 1334 BC | c. 1332 BC | c. 2 years | |
| Twosret | | Pharaoh | New Kingdom of Egypt | c. 1191 BC | c. 1188 BC | 3 years | |
| Arsinoe II (Note: Many of the Ptolemaic kings co-ruled with their queens. However, Arsinoe II, Berenice II, Arsinoe III and Cleopatra I are considered monarchs by Sally-Ann Ashton, but not by Tara Sewell-Lasater.) | | Pharaoh (disputed) | Ptolemaic Kingdom | 273 or 272 BC | 270 or 268 BC | 2–5 years | |
| Berenice II | | Pharaoh (disputed) | Ptolemaic Kingdom | 246 BC | 221 BC | 25 years | |
| Arsinoe III | | Pharaoh (disputed) | Ptolemaic Kingdom | 220 BC | 204 BC | 16 years | |
| Cleopatra I | | Pharaoh (disputed) | Ptolemaic Kingdom | 193 BC | 176 BC | 17 years | |
| Cleopatra II | | Pharaoh | Ptolemaic Kingdom | 170 BC | 164 BC | 51 years (Total) | |
| Cleopatra II | | Pharaoh | Ptolemaic Kingdom | 163 BC | 127 BC | 51 years (Total) | |
| Cleopatra II | | Pharaoh | Ptolemaic Kingdom | 124 BC | 115 BC | 51 years (Total) | |
| Cleopatra III | | Pharaoh | Ptolemaic Kingdom | c. 139 BC | 130 BC | c. 35 years (Total) | |
| Cleopatra III | | Pharaoh | Ptolemaic Kingdom | 127 BC | 101 BC | c. 35 years (Total) | |
| Berenice III | | Pharaoh | Ptolemaic Kingdom | 101 BC | 88 BC | 14 years (Total) | |
| Berenice III | | Pharaoh | Ptolemaic Kingdom | 81 BC | 80 BC | 14 years (Total) | |
| Cleopatra V (Note: Cleopatra V and Cleopatra VI are most likely the same person.) | | Pharaoh | Ptolemaic Kingdom | 79 BC | 69 BC | 10 years | |
| Cleopatra VI | – | Pharaoh | Ptolemaic Kingdom | 58 BC | 57 BC | 1 year | |
| Berenice IV | – | Pharaoh | Ptolemaic Kingdom | 58 BC | 55 BC | 3 years | |
| Cleopatra VII | | Pharaoh | Ptolemaic Kingdom | 51 BC | 12 August 30 BC | 21 years | |
| Arsinoe IV | | Pharaoh (disputed) | Ptolemaic Kingdom | December 48 BC | January 47 BC | 1 or 2 months | |
| Zenobia | | Queen (disputed) | Aegyptus | October 270 | June 272 | 1 year and 9 months | |
| Shajar al-Durr | | Sultan | Mamluk Sultanate | 2 May 1250 | 30 July 1250 | 3 months | |

===== Libya =====
| Monarch | Portrait | State | Reign dates | Length | Ref. |
|---|---|---|---|---|---|
| Berenice II | | Cyrenaica | 258–246 BC | 12 years | |
| Cleopatra Selene II | | Cyrenaica | 34–30 BC | 4 years | |

===== Sudan =====
| Monarch | Portrait | Office | State | Reign dates | Length | Ref. |
|---|---|---|---|---|---|---|
| Nahirqo | | Kandake | Kingdom of Kush | Mid-2nd century BC | – | |
| Unknown Queen (Note: She is the queen buried in Bar. 8. Her name is unknown.) | – | Kandake | Kingdom of Kush | End of 2nd–first half of 1st century BC | – | |
| Amanirenas | | Kandake | Kingdom of Kush | End of 1st century BC–Beginning of 1st century AD | – | |
| Amanishakheto | | Kandake | Kingdom of Kush | Early 1st century AD | – | |
| Shanakdakhete | – | Kandake | Kingdom of Kush | First half of the 1st century AD | – | |
| Nawidemak | | Kandake | Kingdom of Kush | First half of the 1st century AD | – | |
| Amanitore | | Kandake | Kingdom of Kush | Mid-1st century AD | – | |
| Amanikhatashan | | Kandake | Kingdom of Kush | Mid-2nd century AD | – | |
| Amanikhalika | | Kandake | Kingdom of Kush | Second half of the 2nd century AD | – | |
| Patrapeamani | | Kandake | Kingdom of Kush | First half of the 4th century AD | – | |
| Amanipilade | | Kandake | Kingdom of Kush | Mid-4th century AD | – | |
| Gaua | – | Queen | Dotawo | c. 1520–1526 | c. 6 years | |

==== West Africa ====
===== Benin =====
| Monarch | Office | State | Reign dates | Length | Ref. |
|---|---|---|---|---|---|
| Hangbe | Queen (disputed) | Kingdom of Dahomey | 1716–1718 | 2 years | |
| Hude | Queen | Hogbonu | 1746–1752 | 6 years | |

===== The Gambia =====
| Monarch | Portrait | Office | State | Reign dates | Length | Ref. |
|---|---|---|---|---|---|---|
| Elizabeth II | | Queen | The Gambia | 1965–1970 | 5 years | |

===== Ghana =====
| Monarch | Portrait | Office | State | Start of reign | End of reign | Length | Ref. |
|---|---|---|---|---|---|---|---|
| Dode Akaabi | – | Gã Mantse | Gã | 1610 | 1635 | 25 years | |
| Afrakoma | – | Ohemmaa | Akwamu | 1625 | 1640 | 15 years | |
| Amoako Atta Yiadom | – | Denkyirahene | Denkyira | 1770 | 1793 | 23 years | |
| Nana Afia Dokuaa | – | Okyenhene | Akyem Abuakwa | 1817 | 1835 | 18 years | |
| Ama Sewa | – | Dwabenhene | Dwaben | c. 1841 | c. 1845 | c. 4 years | |
| Nana Juaben Serwaa II | – | Dwabenhene | Dwaben | 1959 | 1963 | 4 years | |
| Elizabeth II | | Queen | Dominion of Ghana | 6 March 1957 | 1 July 1960 | 3 years, 117 days | |

===== Guinea-Bissau =====
====== Orango ======
- Okinka Pampa (reigned 1910–1930)

====== Canhabaque ======
- Idiana Ibop, also known as Juliana (reigned ?–1925)

===== Côte d'Ivoire =====
====== Baoule ======
- Pokou (reigned c. 1750 – c. 1760) – Queen and founder of the Baoule tribe.
- Akwa Boni (reigned c. 1760 – c. 1790) – Pokou's niece who succeeded her to the throne.

===== Liberia =====
- Famata Bendu Sandemani, queen of the Vai people (reigned ?–1892)

===== Mali =====
====== Mali Empire ======
- Kassi (reigned ?–1352/1353), co-ruler with Mansa Sulayman

===== Nigeria =====
====== Akure Kingdom ======
- Èyé Àró (reigned 1393–1419)
- Èyémọ̀ị́n (reigned 1705–1735)
- Amọ́robíòjò (reigned 1850–1851)

====== Arnado Debbo ======
Arnado Debbo has been ruled by women for about two and a half centuries (since 1770).

- Nyagangwu Sukbarub
- Nyagangwu Seuduu
- Nyagangwu Jubkuna
- Nyagangwu Shukji
- Nyagangwu Kuhube
- Nyagangwu Nyagyeb
- Nygangwu Nyabuu
- Nyagangwu Saante
- Nyagangwu Gan Ya Khantso
- Nyagangwu Nyasir
- Nyagangwu Wekangshi
- Nyagangwu Umma Toro
- Nyaganwu Astadukko Buba
- Nyagangwu Bintu Namda

====== Daura ======
The title "Kabara" was used by female monarchs who ruled over the Hausa people in the Middle Ages. A line of matriarchal monarchs is recorded in the Kano Chronicle that ends with the reign of Daurama in the 9th century. These queens reigned from c. 700 to c. 1000.

- Kufuru
- Ginu
- Yakumo
- Yakunya
- Wanzamu
- Yanbamu
- Gizir-gizir
- Inna-Gari
- Daurama
- Ga-Wata
- Shata
- Fatatuma
- Sai-Da-Mata
- Ja-Mata
- Ha-Mata
- Zama
- Sha-Wata
- Daurama II

====== Federation of Nigeria ======
- Elizabeth II, Queen of Nigeria (reigned 1960–1963)

====== Ifẹ ======
- Ooni Luwoo (reigned in the 10th century)

====== Igala Kingdom ======
- Ebulejonu, also known as Ebule (reigned in the 16th century)

====== Igodomigodo ======
- Emose (reigned 584–600)
- Orrorro (reigned 600–618)

====== Kumbwada ======
Kumbwada has been ruled by women for at least six successive generations.

- Magajiya Maimuna
- Hajiya Maimuna (reigned ?–1998) – grandmother of Hajiya Haidzatu Ahmed
- Hajiya Haidzatu Ahmed (reigned 1998–2021)
- Idris (reigned 2021–present) – daughter of Hajiya Haidzatu Ahmed

====== Ondo Kingdom ======
- Pupupu, founder and ruler of the Ondo Kingdom c. 1510.

====== Oyo Empire ======
- Orompoto (reigned c. 1555–1575) – Succeeded her brother Eguguojo to the throne.

====== Zazzau ======
- Bakwa Turunku (reigned 1536–1539/1566)
- Amina (reigned 1576–1610)
- Zaria (reigned 1610–?) – she succeeded her sister Amina

===== Senegal =====
| Monarch | Portrait | Office | State | Start of reign | End of reign | Length | Ref. |
|---|---|---|---|---|---|---|---|
| Tegue Rella Khouriyaye (Note: These Queens of Waalo, as legitimate heiresses to the crown, selected the King (Brak) to share the crown with the Queen (Lingeer).) | | Lingeer | Waalo | Unknown | c. 1800s | — | |
| Fatim Yamar | | Lingeer | Waalo | c. 1810s | 1820 | — | |
| Njembot Mbodj | | Lingeer | Waalo | 1820 | 1846 | 26 years | |
| Ndaté Yalla Mbodj | | Lingeer | Waalo | 1846 | 1855 | 9 years | |
| Ayimpène | | Queen | Floup people | c. 1907 | c. 1931 | c. 24 years | |
| Sibeth (Sibet) | | Queen | Floup people | Late 1930s | 1976 | c. 37–39 years | |

===== Sierra Leone =====
| Monarch | Portrait | Office | State | Start of reign | End of reign | Length | Ref. |
|---|---|---|---|---|---|---|---|
| Fatima | | Queen | Koya Temne | 1826 | 1840 | 14 years | |
| Madam Yoko | | Queen | Kpa Mende | 1878 | 1906 | 28 years | |
| Elizabeth II | | Queen | Dominion of Sierra Leone | 1961 | 1971 | 10 years | |

==== Central Africa ====
===== Angola =====
| Monarch | Portrait | Office | State | Start of reign | End of reign | Length |
|---|---|---|---|---|---|---|
| Mussasa | – | Queen | Imbangala | 17th century | Unknown | – |
| Tembandumba | | Queen | Imbangala | 17th century | Unknown | – |
| Mwongo Matamba | – | Queen | Matamba | Unknown | 1631 | – |
| Nzinga (Ana I) | | Ngola | Ndongo | 1624 | 1626 | 2 years |
| Nzinga (Ana I) | | Ngola | Ndongo | 1657 | 1663 | 6 years |
| Nzinga (Ana I) | | Queen | Matamba | 1631 | 1663 | 32 years |
| Barbara | – | Ngola | Ndongo | 1663 | 1666 | 3 years |
| Barbara | – | Queen | Matamba | 1663 | 1666 | 3 years |
| Verónica I (Note: She also had the title of Queen of Ndongo, but in title only, as the Kingdom of Ndongo was destroyed in the Battle of Pungo Andongo in 1671.) | – | Queen | Matamba | 1681 | 1721 | 40 years |
| Ana II | – | Queen | Matamba | 1742 | 1756 | 14 years |
| Verónica II | – | Queen | Matamba | 1756 | 1758 | 2 years |
| Ana III | – | Queen | Matamba | 1758 | 1767 | 9 years |
| Kamana | – | Queen | Jinga | 1767 | 1810 | 43 years |

====== Mbunda Kingdom ======
- Vamwene Naama
- Vamwene Yamvu
- Vamwene Mbaao ya Chinguli (reigned in the 1500s–early 1600s)
- Vamwene Kaamba ka Mbaao
- Vamwene Mukenge wa Lweembe, Livindamo

====== Kingdom of Kongo ======
There were two female monarchs during Kongo Civil War.

- Ana Afonso de Leão, queen of Nkondo and matriarch of Kinlaza
- Suzana de Nóbrega, queen of Luvota and matriarch of Kimpanzu

====== Luvale ======
Nhakatolo or Nyakatolo is the hereditary queen of Luvale.

- Nyakatolo Kuvango (reigned in the 19th century)
- Nyakatolo Ngambo (reigned c. 1903 – 1914)
- Nyakatolo Kutemba (reigned c. 1918 – 1956)
- Nyakatolo Chissengo (reigned 1957 – 1992)
- Lurdes Nhakatolo Tchilombo (reigned 2004 – 2023)
- Anabela Ngambo Kaumba (reigned 2024 – present)

===== Cameroon =====
- Wou-Ten, founder of the Tikar dynasty (reigned c. 1299–?)
- Ngon-Nso, founder of the Nso dynasty (reigned late 14th century–c. 1421)
- Soukda, founder of the Mandara Kingdom (reigned c. 1500)
- Ngoungoure, queen of Bamum (reigned 1865) – her reign lasted 30 minutes

===== Chad =====
| Monarch | Portrait | Office | State | Start of reign | End of reign | Length | Ref. |
|---|---|---|---|---|---|---|---|
| Aissa Koli | – | Magira | Kanem–Bornu Empire | 1563 | 1570 | 7 years | |

===== Congo-Kinshasa =====
| Monarch | Portrait | Office | State | Start of reign | End of reign | Length |
|---|---|---|---|---|---|---|
| Lueji A'Nkonde | – | Queen | Lunda Kingdom | c. 1650 | c. 1670 | c. 20 years |
| Diambi Kabatusuila | | Queen | Bakwa Luntu | 15 July 2017 | Incumbent | |

==== East Africa ====
===== Comoros =====
| Monarch | Portrait | Office | State | Start of reign | End of reign | Length | Ref. |
|---|---|---|---|---|---|---|---|
| Alimah I | – | Sultan | Ndzuwani | Unknown | c. 1590 | – | |
| Alimah II | – | Sultan | Ndzuwani | c. 1632 | c. 1676 | 44 years | |
| Alimah III | – | Sultan | Ndzuwani | c. 1676 | c. 1711 | 35 years | |
| Wabedja | – | Sultan | Itsandra | Unknown | 1743 | c. 50 years | |
| Alimah IV | – | Sultan | Ndzuwani | 1788 | 1792 | 4 years | |
| Djoumbé Fatima | | Sultan | Mwali | 1842 | September 1865 | 23 years | |
| Djoumbé Fatima | | Sultan | Mwali | 1874 | 1878 | 4 years | |
| Salima Machamba | | Sultan | Mwali | 1888 | 1909 | 21 years | |

Other female sultans also ruled on the Comoros, but their reign dates are unknown:

| Monarch | Office | State | Reign dates | Ref. |
|---|---|---|---|---|
| Nyau wa Faume | Sultan | Bambao | Unknown | |
| Ja Mhaba | Sultan | Bajini | c. 1880s | |
| Hadija bint Ahmed | Sultan | Bajini | c. 1880s | |

===== Ethiopia =====
| Monarch | Portrait | Office | State | Start of reign | End of reign | Length |
|---|---|---|---|---|---|---|
| Zewditu | | Empress | Ethiopian Empire | 27 September 1916 | 2 April 1930 | 13 years, 187 days |

===== Kenya =====
- Elizabeth II, Queen of Kenya (reigned 1963–1964)
- Mwana Mkisi, founder of Mombasa, founded in c. 900 AD
- Mwana Inali, ruler of Kitao on Manda Island – she was the ruler of Kitao when the Pate Sultan Omar (d. 1392/3) conquered Kitao, according to the Pate Chronicle
- Queen of Lamu, name unknown (reigned in the 16th century) – she was deposed by Bwana Bashira but was reinstated with the help of Portugal
- Mwana Mimi, ruler of the Pate Sultanate (reigned 1763–1773)

===== Madagascar =====
| Monarch | Portrait | Office | State | Start of reign | End of reign | Length | Ref. |
|---|---|---|---|---|---|---|---|
| Rangita | – | Queen | Vazimba | 1520 | 1530 | 10 years | |
| Rafohy | – | Queen | Vazimba | 1530 | 1540 | 10 years | |
| Bety | – | Queen | Betsimisaraka | 1750 | 1762 | 12 years | |
| Andrianaginarivo | – | Queen | Boina Kingdom | 1777 | 1778 | 1 year | |
| Tombola | – | Queen | Boina Kingdom | 1778 | 1778 | Less than 1 year | |
| Ravahiny | – | Queen | Boina Kingdom | 1778 | 1808 | 30 years | |
| Ranavalona I | | Queen | Merina Kingdom | 11 August 1828 | 16 August 1861 | 33 years, 5 days | |
| Oantitsy | – | Queen | Boina Kingdom | 1832 | 1836 | 4 years | |
| Tsiomeko | – | Queen | Boina Kingdom | 1836 | 1840 | 4 years | |
| Rasoherina | | Queen | Merina Kingdom | 12 May 1863 | 1 April 1868 | 4 years, 325 days | |
| Ranavalona II | | Queen | Merina Kingdom | 2 April 1868 | 13 July 1883 | 15 years, 102 days | |
| Ranavalona III | | Queen | Merina Kingdom | 30 July 1883 | 28 February 1897 | 13 years, 213 days | |

====== Ambohidratrimo ======
- Ravorombato

====== Menabe ======
- Bibiasa

====== Bemihisatra ======
- Safy Mozongo – Mother of Binao
- Binao – Daughter of Safy Mozongo

====== Bemazava ======
- Irana
- Tsiresy I
- Tsiresy II

====== Antankarana ======
- Ambary
- Soanaomby

===== Mauritius =====
| Monarch | Portrait | Office | State | Start of reign | End of reign | Length |
|---|---|---|---|---|---|---|
| Elizabeth II | | Queen | Mauritius | 1968 | 1992 | 24 years |

===== Mozambique =====
====== Angoche Sultanate ======
- Queen of Angoche, name unknown (reigned in the 16th century) – she succeeded her brother and was succeeded by her husband Molidi

===== Somalia =====
- Asha Ngumi, ruler of Ngumi Island in the Bajuni Islands

===== Somaliland =====
====== Sultanate of Ifat ======
- Māti Layla Abūd (c. 1344–1352)

===== South Sudan =====
====== Shilluk Kingdom ======
- Abudok, the eighth ruler (and only queen) of the Shilluk.

===== Tanzania =====
====== Tanganyika ======
- Elizabeth II, Queen of Tanganyika (reigned 1961–1962)

====== Unguja ======
- Mwana Mwema, queen of Unguja (reigned ?–1653)
- Fatuma binti Yusuf al-Alawi, queen of Unguja (reigned ?–1698 and 1709–1715)

====== Pemba Island ======
- Mwana Mize binti Muaba (reigned in the 17th century)
- Mwana Fatuma binti Dathash (reigned in the 17th century)
- Mwana Hadiya (reigned in the 17th century)
- Mwana Aisha (reigned in the 17th century)

====== Tumbatu Island ======
- Mwana wa Mwana
- Fatima
- Mwana Kazija bint Ngwale bin Kombo bin Ali

====== Kua ======
- Mother of Mwanzuani
- Mwanzuani – she succeeded her mother

====== Mikindani ======
- Sabani binti Ngumi – she was succeeded by her daughter
- Daughter of Sabani binti Ngumi

====== Unyanyembe ======
- Mugalula (reigned 1893)

====== Kilwa ======
- Sultan Fatima Binti Muhammad Mkubwa (reigned c. 1711)

===== Uganda =====
| Monarch | Portrait | Office | State | Start of reign | End of reign | Length | Ref. |
|---|---|---|---|---|---|---|---|
| Nyakahuma | – | Queen | Busongora Kingdom | c. 1330 | c. 1375 | c. 45 years | |
| Kitami kya Nyawera | – | Queen | Busongora Kingdom | c. 1685 | c. 1725 | c. 40 years | |
| Kantunguru | – | Queen | Busongora Kingdom | c. 1740 | c. 1750 | c. 10 years | |
| Akech | – | Queen | Paroketu | 1760 | 1787 | 27 years | |
| Kogyere III Ikamiro | – | Queen | Busongora Kingdom | 1886 | 1889 | 3 years | |
| Elizabeth II | | Queen | Dominion of Uganda | 9 October 1962 | 9 October 1963 | 1 year, 0 days | |

==== Southern Africa ====
===== Eswatini =====
The Ndlovukati serves as a joint head of state, ruling alongside the Ngwenyama.

- LaYaka Ndwandwe
- Lomvula Mndzebele
- Lojiba Simelane
- Tsandzile Ndwandwe
- Sisile Khumalo
- Tibati Nkambule
- Labotsibeni Mdluli
- Lomawa Ndwandwe
- Nukwase Ndwandwe
- Zihlathi Ndwandwe/Mkhatjwa
- Seneleleni Ndwandwe
- Dzeliwe Shongwe
- Ntfombi Tfwala (reigned 1983–present)

===== Malawi =====
| Monarch | Portrait | Office | State | Start of reign | End of reign | Length |
|---|---|---|---|---|---|---|
| Elizabeth II | | Queen | Malawi | 1964 | 1966 | 2 years |

===== Namibia =====
| Monarch | Office | State | Start of reign | End of reign | Length | Ref. |
|---|---|---|---|---|---|---|
| Kapango | Queen | Mbunza | c. 1750 | – | – | |
| Mate I | Hompa | Uukwangali | c. 1750 | – | – | |
| Nankali | Hompa | Uukwangali | c. 1770 | – | – | |
| Simbara | Hompa | Uukwangali | 1785 | 1800 | 15 years | |
| Mate II | Hompa | Uukwangali | 1800 | 1818 | 18 years | |
| Nakashwa | Queen | Ongandjera | 1862 | – | – | |
| Mpande | Hompa | Uukwangali | 1880 | 1886 | 6 years | |
| Kanuni | Hompa | Uukwangali | 1926 | 1941 | 28 years (Total) | |
| Kanuni | Hompa | Uukwangali | 1958 | 1971 | 28 years (Total) | |
| Maria Mwengere | Queen | Shambyu | 1947 | 1987 | 40 years | |
| Anna Katrina Christiaan | Kaptein | Bondelswarts | 1977 | 2011 | 34 years | |
| Angelina Matumbo Ribebe | Queen | Shambyu | 1989 | 2015 | 26 years | |
| Martha Nelumbu | Ohmaba | Oukwanyama | November 2005 | Incumbent | 20 years to date | |
| Sofia Mundjembwe Kanyetu | Queen | Shambyu | 2023 | Incumbent | 2 years to date | |

===== South Africa =====
| Monarch | Portrait | Office | State | Start of reign | End of reign | Length |
|---|---|---|---|---|---|---|
| Mamani kaPhahlo | | Queen | AmaMpondomise | 1732 | 1758 | 26 years |
| Elizabeth II | | Queen | Union of South Africa | 1952 | 1961 | 9 years |

====== Lobedu queendom ======
The Modjadji or Rain Queen is the hereditary queen of Lobedu, the people of the Limpopo Province of South Africa. The succession to the position of Rain Queen is matrilineal, meaning that the Queen's eldest daughter is the heir, and that males are not entitled to inherit the throne at all. The Rain Queen is believed to have special powers, including the ability to control the clouds and rainfall.

- Maselekwane Modjadji (reigned 1800–1854)
- Masalanabo I Modjadji (reigned 1854–1894)
- Khetoane Modjadji (reigned 1895–1959)
- Makoma Modjadji (reigned 1959–1980)
- Mokope Modjadji (reigned 1981–2001)
- Makobo Modjadji (reigned 2003–2005)
- Masalanabo II Modjadji (reigned 2023–present)

===== Zambia =====
====== Makololo ======
- Mamochisane (reigned 1851)

====== Lozi kingdom ======
The Lozi kingdom is divided into north and south. The north (called Namuso) is ruled by a man, the Litunga or "King", while the south (called Lwambi) is ruled by a woman, the Litunga la Mboela or "Queen of the south", and is subordinate to the north.

- Notulu
- Kandundu
- Kaiko
- Mwangala
- Matauka
- Maibiba
- Atangambuyu
- Mulima
- Makwibi (reigned 1959–2011)
- Mbuyu (reigned 2011–present)

===== Zimbabwe =====
| Monarch | Portrait | Office | State | Start of reign | End of reign | Length |
|---|---|---|---|---|---|---|
| Elizabeth II | | Queen | Rhodesia | 1965 | 1970 | 5 years |

=== Americas ===
==== North America ====
===== Canada =====
| Monarch | Portrait | Office | State | Start of reign | End of reign | Length | Ref. |
|---|---|---|---|---|---|---|---|
| Victoria (Note: Canada became a dominion by the Canadian Confederation in 1867.) | | Queen | Canada | 1867 | 1901 | 34 years | |
| Elizabeth II | | Queen | Canada | 1952 | 2022 | 70 years | |

===== Mexico =====
====== Coba ======
- Ix Ch'ak Ch'een (reigned c. 569 – c. 573)
- Lady Yopaat (reigned c. 600 – c. 640)
- Lady Kʼawiil Ajaw (reigned 640–682)

====== Ecatepec ======
- Tlapalizquixochtzin (reigned in the late 15th–early 16th century)

====== Palenque ======
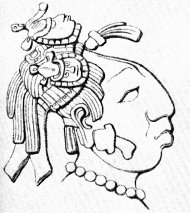
Sak Kʼukʼ

- Ix Yohl Ikʼnal (reigned 583–604)
- Sak Kʼukʼ, also known as Muwaan Mat (reigned 612–615)

====== Tepetlaoztoc ======
- Azcasuch (reigned 1489–1498)

====== Toltec Empire ======
- Xiuhtlaltzin (reigned 979–983)

====== Toniná ======
- Lady K'awiil Yopaat (reigned 762–774)

====== Tzacoalco ======
- Malinxalchitl (reigned ?–1524)

====== Mixtec ======
- Lady 9 Wind Stone Quexquemitl
- Lady 6 Monkey War Quexquemitl
- Lady 1 Death
- Lady 13 Flower Precious Bird
- Lady 2 Flower Rising Jewel
- Lady 11 Monkey Jade Spiderweb
- Lady 11 Alligator Quetzal Jewel
- Lady 2 Jaguar Jade Spiderweb
- Lady 5 Rabbit Jewel
- Lady 3 Jaguar Precious Butterfly Sun
- Lady 6 Water Quetzal Jewel of Flower War
- Lady 3 Rabbit Divine Flame
- Lady 12 Flower Broken Mountain Butterfly
- Lady 11 Rabbit Jewel of the Rising Sun
- Lady 8 Deer Quetzal Spiderweb
- Lady 1 Flower Jaguar Quexquemitl

==== Central America ====
===== Belize =====
| Monarch | Portrait | Office | State | Start of reign | End of reign | Length | Ref. |
|---|---|---|---|---|---|---|---|
| Elizabeth II | | Queen | Belize | 21 September 1981 | 8 September 2022 | 40 years, 352 days | |

====== Pusilha ======
- Lady Ich’aak K’inich (reigned c.710–731)

===== Guatemala =====
====== El Perú ======
- Lady K'abel (reigned 672–692)

====== La Florida ======
- Lady Chaak (reigned c. 731)

====== Naranjo ======
- Wac Chanil Ahau, also known as Lady Six Sky

====== Tikal ======
- Unen Bahlam (reigned c. 317)
- Lady of Tikal (reigned 511–527?)

==== Caribbean ====
===== West Indies =====
| Monarch | Portrait | Office | State | Start of reign | End of reign | Length | Ref. |
|---|---|---|---|---|---|---|---|
| Elizabeth II | | Queen | Antigua and Barbuda | 1 November 1981 | 8 September 2022 | 40 years, 311 days | |
| Elizabeth II | | Queen | Bahamas | 10 July 1973 | 8 September 2022 | 49 years, 60 days | |
| Elizabeth II | | Queen | Barbados | 30 November 1966 | 30 November 2021 | 55 years, 0 days | |
| Elizabeth II | | Queen | Grenada | 7 February 1974 | 8 September 2022 | 48 years, 213 days | |
| Elizabeth II | | Queen | Jamaica | 6 August 1962 | 8 September 2022 | 60 years, 33 days | |
| Elizabeth II | | Queen | Saint Kitts and Nevis | 19 September 1983 | 8 September 2022 | 38 years, 354 days | |
| Elizabeth II | | Queen | Saint Lucia | 22 February 1979 | 8 September 2022 | 43 years, 198 days | |
| Elizabeth II | | Queen | Saint Vincent and the Grenadines | 27 October 1979 | 8 September 2022 | 42 years, 316 days | |
| Elizabeth II | | Queen | Trinidad and Tobago | 31 August 1962 | 1 August 1976 | 13 years, 130 days | |

==== South America ====
===== Brazil =====
| Monarch | Portrait | Office | State | Start of reign | End of reign | Length |
|---|---|---|---|---|---|---|
| Maria I | | Queen | Kingdom of Brazil | 16 December 1815 | 20 March 1816 | 95 days |

===== Ecuador =====
- Quilago (reigned in the early 16th century) – queen of Cochasquí

===== Guyana =====
| Monarch | Portrait | Office | State | Start of reign | End of reign | Length |
|---|---|---|---|---|---|---|
| Elizabeth II | | Queen | Guyana | 1966 | 1970 | 4 years |

===== Peru =====
- Lady of Cao, Moche ruler

=== Asia ===
==== East Asia ====
===== China =====
| Monarch | Portrait | Office | State | Start of reign | End of reign | Length |
|---|---|---|---|---|---|---|
| Daughter of Xiaoming | – | Empress (disputed) | Northern Wei | 1 April 528 | 1 April 528 | Less than 1 day |
| Wu Zetian | | Empress | Wu Zhou | 16 October 690 | 21 February 705 | 14 years, 128 days |

====== Eastern Queendom ======
In Tibet, there was Nüguo (Chinese: 女國, lit. "Kingdom of Women"), also known as Dong nüguo (Chinese: 東女國, lit. "Eastern Kingdom of Women"), related to the tribe Sumpa. Several queens regnant of there were recorded in Chinese history books.

- Supi Mojie (Chinese: 蘇毗末羯)
- Dajiawa (Chinese: 达甲瓦)
- Qibangsun (Chinese: 弃邦孙)
- Tangpangshi (Chinese: 湯滂氏)
- Lianbi (Chinese: 斂臂)
- Eyaner (Chinese: 俄琰兒)
- Zhaoyefu (Chinese: 趙曳夫)

====== Wuman ======
- Acha (Cuanman) (Chinese: 阿姹) – her son Cuan Shouyu submitted to Geluofeng of Nanzhao, and instead she declared herself "Wáng of the Wuman tribe (烏蠻部落王)"

====== Kingdom of Derge ======
Within the Derge royal lineage of Dharma Kings (法王), there were two female "Dharma Kings".

- Yangchen Drolma (reigned 1774–1786)
- Tsewang Lhamo (reigned 1790–1806/08, disputed)

====== Yarkent Khanate ======
- Khanum Padshah, also known as Jallad Khanum ("Butcher Queen") (reigned 1695)

===== Japan =====
| Monarch | Portrait | Office | State | Start of reign | End of reign | Length | Ref. |
|---|---|---|---|---|---|---|---|
| Himiko | – | Queen | Yamatai | c. 180 | c. 247 or 248 | 67 or 68 years | |
| Toyo | – | Queen | Yamatai | c. 248 | Unknown | – | |
| Suiko | | Empress | Yamato | 15 January 593 | 15 April 628 | 35 years, 91 days | |
| Kōgyoku | | Empress | Yamato | 19 February 642 | 12 July 645 | 3 years, 143 days | |
| Saimei | | Empress | Yamato | 14 February 655 | 24 August 661 | 6 years, 191 days | |
| Jitō | | Empress | Japan | 686 | 697 | 11 years | |
| Genmei | | Empress | Japan | 17 August 707 | 3 October 715 | 8 years, 47 days | |
| Genshō | | Empress | Japan | 3 October 715 | 3 March 724 | 8 years, 152 days | |
| Kōken | | Empress | Japan | 19 August 749 | 7 September 758 | 8 years, 324 days | |
| Shōtoku | | Empress | Japan | 6 November 764 | 28 August 770 | 5 years, 295 days | |
| Saionji Neishi (Note: She was the only female to hold the position of Chiten no Kimi (治天の君, 'lord who governs all under heaven'), exercising cloistered rule while reigning alongside the Emperor.) | – | Chiten no Kimi | Northern Court | 1352 | 1353 | 1 year | |
| Meishō | | Empress | Japan | 22 December 1629 | 14 November 1643 | 13 years, 327 days | |
| Go-Sakuramachi | | Empress | Japan | 15 September 1762 | 9 January 1771 | 8 years, 116 days | |

===== Korea =====
| Monarch | Portrait | Office | State | Start of reign | End of reign | Length |
|---|---|---|---|---|---|---|
| Seondeok | | Queen | Silla | 632 | 647 | 15 years |
| Jindeok | – | Queen | Silla | 647 | 654 | 7 years |
| Jinseong | – | Queen | Silla | 887 | 897 | 10 years |

===== Mongolia =====
- Dayicing-Beyiji (Chinese: 大成比吉), the ruling qatun of Yekhe Baishing (Chinese: 大板升) (reigned 1583–1626) – she is the ruling knyaginya Malchikatun (Russian: Малчикатунь) mentioned in Ivan Petlin's report

===== Taiwan =====
The leader of the Puyuma people was referred to as the Puyuma king (卑南王), and the Qing court recognized the autonomous authority of these Taiwanese indigenous peoples, appointing their leaders as Tuguan (土官).

- Bao-zhu (Chinese: 寶珠), ruler of the Puyuma people (reigned c. 1796–c. 1820) – as the queen consort (妃) of the Puyuma king (卑南王), she succeeded her husband

==== South Asia ====
===== Bangladesh =====
| Monarch | Portrait | Office | State | Start of reign | End of reign | Length |
|---|---|---|---|---|---|---|
| Kalindi | – | Rani | Chakma Circle | 1832 | 1873 | 41 years |

===== North India =====
| Monarch | Portrait | Office | State | Start of reign | End of reign | Length | Ref. |
|---|---|---|---|---|---|---|---|
| Kumaradevi | | Empress | Gupta Empire | Early 4th century | Early 4th century | – | |
| Sugandha | – | Queen | Utpala dynasty | 904 | 906 | 2 years | |
| Didda | – | Queen | Utpala dynasty | 980 | 1003 | 23 years | |
| Somalladevi (Note: She was the wife and co-ruler of Ajayaraja II.) | – | Queen | Chahamanas of Shakambhari | c. 1110 | c. 1135 | c. 25 years | |
| Razia Sultana | | Sultana | Delhi Sultanate | 19 November 1236 | 20 April 1240 | 3 years, 153 days | |
| Kota Rani | – | Maharani | Lohara dynasty | 1338 | 1339 | 1 year | |
| Daya Kaur | – | Rani | Nishanwalia Misl | 1786 | 1808 | 22 years | |
| Daya Kaur | – | Rani | Nishanwalia Misl | 1809 | 1823 | 14 years | |
| Victoria | | Empress | British Raj | 1 May 1876 | 22 January 1901 | 24 years, 266 days | |

===== East India =====
| Monarch | Portrait | Office | State | Start of reign | End of reign | Length | Ref. |
|---|---|---|---|---|---|---|---|
| Tribhuvana Mahadevi I | – | Maharajadhiraja | Bhauma-Kara dynasty | 845 | 850 | 5 years | |
| Tribhuvana Mahadevi II | – | Maharajadhiraja | Bhauma-Kara dynasty | 890 | 896 | 6 years | |
| Tribhuvana Mahadevi III | – | Maharajadhiraja | Bhauma-Kara dynasty | 896 | 905 | 9 years | |
| Gauri Mahadevi | – | Maharajadhiraja | Bhauma-Kara dynasty | c. 910 | c. 916 | c. 6 years | |
| Dandi Mahadevi | – | Maharajadhiraja | Bhauma-Kara dynasty | c. 916 | c. 936 | c. 20 years | |
| Vakula Mahadevi | – | Maharajadhiraja | Bhauma-Kara dynasty | c. 936 | c. 940 | c. 4 years | |
| Dharma Mahadevi | – | Maharajadhiraja | Bhauma-Kara dynasty | c. 940 | c. 950 | c. 10 years | |
| Lakhima Devi | – | Maharani | Oiniwar dynasty | 1416 | 1428 | 12 years | |
| Vishwasa Devi | – | Maharani | Oiniwar dynasty | 1431 | 1443 | 12 years | |
| Mohan Kumari | – | Rani | Sambalpur State | 1827 | 1833 | 6 years | |
| Mukhyapan Devi | – | Rani | Sambalpur State | 1849 | 1849 | Less than 1 year | |

===== South India =====
| Monarch | Portrait | Office | State | Start of reign | End of reign | Length | Ref. |
|---|---|---|---|---|---|---|---|
| Sila Mahadevi (Note: She was the wife and co-ruler of Dhruva Dharavarsha.) | – | Empress | Rashtrakuta Empire | Late 8th century | Late 8th century | – | |
| Pandambika | – | Queen | Kotas of Tadikonda | c. 1117 | – | – | |
| Ganapamadevi | – | Queen | Kotas of Yenamadala | 1251 | 1264 | 13 years | |
| Vennaladevi | – | Queen | Kotas of Tadikonda | c. 1261 | – | – | |
| Rudrama Devi | | Maharaja | Kakatiya dynasty | 1262 | November 1289 | 27 years | |
| Ballamahadevi | – | Chakravarti | Alupa dynasty | 1275 | 1292 | 17 years | |
| Chikkayi-Tayi | – | Chakravarti | Alupa dynasty | 1333 | 1348 | 15 years | |
| Abbakka Chowta | | Rani | Ullal | 1525 | 1570 | 45 years | |
| Chennabhairadevi | – | Rani | Gerusoppa | 1552 | 1606 | 54 years | |
| Keladi Chennamma | – | Rani | Keladi Nayaka Kingdom | 1672 | 1697 | 25 years | |
| Ali Raja Bibi Harrabichi Kadavube | – | Arakkal Beevi | Arakkal kingdom | 1728 | 1732 | 4 years | |
| Ali Raja Bibi Junumabe I | – | Arakkal Beevi | Arakkal kingdom | 1732 | 1745 | 13 years | |
| Sujana Bai | | Rani | Thanjavur Maratha kingdom | 1737 | 1738 | 1 year | |
| Virammaji | – | Rani | Keladi Nayaka Kingdom | 1757 | 1763 | 6 years | |
| Ali Raja Bibi Junumabe II | – | Arakkal Beevi | Arakkal kingdom | 1777 | 1819 | 42 years | |
| Velu Nachiyar | | Rani | Sivaganga estate | c. 1780 | c. 1790 | c. 10 years | |
| Vellacci | – | Rani | Sivaganga estate | c. 1790 | c. 1793 | c. 3 years | |
| Devammaji | – | Rani | Kingdom of Coorg | 1809 | 1811 | 2 years | |
| Gowri Lakshmi Bayi | | Maharani | Travancore kingdom | 7 November 1810 | 1813 | 3 years | |

====== Quilon ======
- Queen of Quilon, name unknown (reigned in the early 16th century) – she concluded a treaty with the Portuguese in 1516
- Queen of Quilon, name unknown (reigned in the mid-17th century) – she concluded a treaty with the Dutch in 1659

====== Attingal ======
Attingal was an independent principality until 1729 when Marthanda Varma ascended the throne and incorporated his mother's Attingal in Travancore.

- Makayiram Thirunal (reigned as junior queen ?–? and as senior queen ?–1678)
- Umayamma Rani (reigned as junior queen ?–1678 and as senior queen 1678–1698)
- Queen of Attingal, name unknown (reigned as junior queen ?–1698 and as senior queen 1698–1729) – she was one of the two princesses from Kolathunad adopted by Umayamma Rani in 1688; she concluded an agreement with Britain following the Attingal Outbreak of 1721; she was the mother of Marthanda Varma
- Queen of Attingal, name unknown (reigned as junior queen 1698–?) – she was the other of the two princesses from Kolathunad adopted by Umayamma Rani in 1688

====== Maruthurkulangara ======
- Queen of Maruthurkulangara, name unknown (reigned 1733–?) – she was installed on the throne by Marthanda Varma of Travancore in 1733

====== Kottarakkara ======
- Queen of Elayadathu Swarupam, name unknown (reigned 1739–1742) – she was installed on the throne by the Dutch during the Travancore–Dutch War

===== Western India =====
| Monarch | Portrait | Office | State | Start of reign | End of reign | Length | Ref. |
|---|---|---|---|---|---|---|---|
| Bai Saheb Daphle | – | Rani | Daphlapur State | 16 December 1885 | 13 January 1917 | 31 years, 28 days | |

===== Central India =====
| Monarch | Portrait | Office | State | Start of reign | End of reign | Length | Ref. |
|---|---|---|---|---|---|---|---|
| Ahilyabai Holkar | | Maharani | Indore State | 1 December 1767 | 13 August 1795 | 27 years, 255 days | |
| Qudsia Begum | | Nawab Begum | Bhopal State | 14 November 1819 | 29 November 1837 | 18 years | |
| Shah Jahan Begum | | Nawab Begum | Bhopal State | 1844 | 30 September 1860 | 14 years | |
| Shah Jahan Begum | | Nawab Begum | Bhopal State | 30 October 1868 | 16 June 1901 | 32 years, 229 days | |
| Sikandar Begum | | Nawab Begum | Bhopal State | 30 September 1860 | 30 October 1868 | 8 years, 30 days | |
| Sultan Jahan | | Nawab Begum | Bhopal State | 16 June 1901 | 20 April 1926 | 24 years, 308 days | |
| Prafulla Kumari Devi | – | Rani | Bastar State | 23 November 1922 | 28 February 1936 | 13 years, 97 days | |

===== Maldives =====
| Monarch | Office | State | Start of reign | End of reign | Length |
|---|---|---|---|---|---|
| Srimati Damahara | Queen | Kingdom of Dheeva Maari | 10th century | 10th century | – |
| Khadijah | Sultana | Sultanate of Maldives | 1347 | 1362 | 28 years (Total) |
| Khadijah | Sultana | Sultanate of Maldives | 1363 | 1373 | 28 years (Total) |
| Khadijah | Sultana | Sultanate of Maldives | 1376 | 1379 | 28 years (Total) |
| Raadhafathi | Sultana | Sultanate of Maldives | 1379 | 1380 | 1 year |
| Dhaain | Sultana | Sultanate of Maldives | 1384 | 1388 | 4 years |
| Kuda Kala Kamanafaanu | Sultana | Sultanate of Maldives | 1609 | 1613 | 4 years |
| Amina Kabafaanu | Sultana | Sultanate of Maldives | 1753 | 1754 | 1 year |
| Amina Rani Kilegefaanu | Sultana | Sultanate of Maldives | 1757 | 1759 | 2 years |

===== Nepal =====
| Monarch | Office | State | Start of reign | End of reign | Length |
|---|---|---|---|---|---|
| Ganga Rani | Rani | Kingdom of Bhaktapur | 1560 | Unknown | – |

===== Pakistan =====
| Monarch | Portrait | Office | State | Start of reign | End of reign | Length |
|---|---|---|---|---|---|---|
| Elizabeth II | | Queen | Dominion of Pakistan | 1952 | 1956 | 4 years |

====== Assacani ======
- Cleophis (disputed) (Note: Justin claims Cleophis ruled in her own right, however, Metz Epitome describes her as merely regent on behalf of her grandson.), ruled 326 BC–?

====== Gilgit ======
- Dadi Jawari (reigned 1642—1667 and 1689—1705) – also known as Malika Jawahir Khatun
- Malika Sahibnuma, also spelled as Sahebnuma (reigned 1825–1828)

====== Hunza ======
- Nur Bibi (reigned in the 15th century)

====== Kanhaiya Misl ======
- Sada Kaur (reigned 1789–1821)

====== Soomra dynasty ======
- Hamoon (reigned 1107) – she occupied the throne after her husband Sanghar's death, but was soon crushed by the nobles

===== Sri Lanka =====
| Monarch | Picture | Office | State | Start of reign | End of reign | Length |
|---|---|---|---|---|---|---|
| Anula | – | Queen | Anuradhapura Kingdom | 47 BCE | 42 BCE | 5 years |
| Sivali | – | Queen | Anuradhapura Kingdom | 35 CE | 35 CE | 4 months |
| Sugala Devi | – | Queen | Principality of Ruhuna | Unknown | 1158 | – |
| Lilavati | – | Queen | Kingdom of Polonnaruwa | 1197 | 1200 | 5 years (Total) |
| Lilavati | – | Queen | Kingdom of Polonnaruwa | 1209 | 1210 | 5 years (Total) |
| Lilavati | – | Queen | Kingdom of Polonnaruwa | 1211 | 1212 | 5 years (Total) |
| Kalyanavati | – | Queen | Kingdom of Polonnaruwa | 1202 | 1208 | 6 years |
| Kusumasana Devi | | Queen | Kingdom of Kandy | 1581 | 1581 | Less than 1 year |
| Elizabeth II | | Queen | Dominion of Ceylon | 6 February 1952 | 22 May 1972 | 20 years, 106 days |

==== Southeast Asia ====
===== Cambodia =====
| Monarch | Picture | Office | State | Start of reign | End of reign | Length |
|---|---|---|---|---|---|---|
| Soma | – | Queen | Funan | 68 CE | Unknown | – |
| Kulaprabhavati | – | Queen | Funan | 514 | 517 | 3 years |
| Kambuja-raja-lakshmi | – | Queen | Chenla | 575 | 580 | 5 years |
| Jayadevi | – | Queen | Chenla | c. 681 | c. 713 | 32 years |
| Indrani | – | Queen | Sambhupura | 8th century | – | – |
| Nṛpatendradevī | – | Queen | Sambhupura | 8th century | – | – |
| Jayendrabhā | – | Queen | Sambhupura | 8th century | – | – |
| Jyeṣṭhāryā | – | Queen | Sambhupura | c. 803 | Unknown | – |
| Tey | – | Queen | Kingdom of Cambodia | 1687 | 1687 | Few months |
| Ang Mey | | Queen | Kingdom of Cambodia | May 1835 | 1840 | 5 years |
| Ang Mey | | Queen | Kingdom of Cambodia | March 1844 | October 1846 | 2 years, 7 months |
| Sisowath Kossamak | | Queen | Kingdom of Cambodia | 20 June 1960 | 9 October 1970 | 10 years, 111 days |

===== Sumatra =====
| Monarch | Portrait | Office | State | Start of reign | End of reign | Length | Ref. |
|---|---|---|---|---|---|---|---|
| Permaisuri Iskandar Syah (Note: It is not her name, but it means "Queen of Iskandar Syah". Her name is unknown.) | – | Queen | Kingdom of Bentan | c. 1290 | Unknown | – | |
| Nur Ilah | – | Sultana | Samudera Pasai Sultanate | 1360/69 | 1380/89 | 20 years | |
| Nahrasiyah | | Sultana | Samudera Pasai Sultanate | 1406 | 1428 | 22 years | |
| Taj ul-Alam Safiatuddin Syah | | Sultana | Aceh Sultanate | 18 February 1641 | 23 October 1675 | 34 years, 247 days | |
| Nurul Alam Naqiatuddin Syah | – | Sultana | Aceh Sultanate | 23 October 1675 | 23 January 1678 | 2 years, 92 days | |
| Inayat Zakiatuddin Syah | – | Sultana | Aceh Sultanate | 23 January 1678 | 3 February 1688 | 10 years, 11 days | |
| Zainatuddin Kamalat Syah | – | Sultana | Aceh Sultanate | 3 October 1688 | October 1699 | 11 years | |

====== Jambi Sultanate ======
- Putri Selaras Pinang Masak (reigned 1460–1480) – she co-ruled with her husband Datuk Puduko Berhalo

====== Old Port Pacification Superintendency ======
- Shi Er-jie (Chinese: 施二姐), also romanized as Shih Er-chieh (reigned c. 1431) – she succeeded her father Shi Jinqing (施進卿) but contested with her brother Shi Jisun (施濟孫)

====== Pagaruyung Kingdom ======
Bundo Kanduang is the title for a female leader in Minangkabau.

- Puti Reno Silinduang Bulan (reigned 1457–1460)
- Puti Panjang Rambut II (reigned 1460–1480) – she is the queen who appears in the Cindua Mato epic

===== Java =====
| Monarch | Portrait | Office | State | Start of reign | End of reign | Length | Ref. |
|---|---|---|---|---|---|---|---|
| Shima | – | Queen | Kalingga Kingdom | c. 674 | c. 695 | 21 years | |
| Sri Isyana Tunggawijaya | – | Maharani | Mataram kingdom | 947 | c. 958 | 11 years | |
| Tribhuwana Wijayatunggadewi | | Maharani | Majapahit Empire | 1328 | 1350 | 22 years | |
| Suhita | | Maharani | Majapahit Empire | 1429 | 1447 | 18 years | |
| Ratu Kalinyamat | | Sultana | Kalinyamat Sultanate | c. 1549 | c. 1579 | 30 years | |
| Raden Ayu Rasmana Tirtanegara (Note: She was an autonomous ruler. The Duchy of Sumenep, which was originally under the Mataram Sultanate, fell into the hands of the Dutch East India Company in 1705 and became an autonomous state.) | – | Adipati | Duchy of Sumenep | 1750 | 1762 | 12 years | |

====== Lodoyong Kingdom ======
- Dyah Tulodong (reigned ?–1032) – she was a queen of Lodoyong, now Tulungagung; she defeated Airlangga in 1031, but was ultimately defeated by Airlangga in 1032

====== Sindangkasih Kingdom ======
Female rulers of Sindangkasih Kingdom:

- Nyai Ambetkasih, also known as Nyi Rambut Kasih (reigned in the 15th century)

===== Nusa Tenggara =====
| Monarch | Portrait | Office | State | Start of reign | End of reign | Length | Ref. |
|---|---|---|---|---|---|---|---|
| Śri Wijaya Mahadewi | – | Queen | Bali Kingdom | 983 | 989 | 6 years | |
| Mahendradatta | – | Queen | Bali Kingdom | 989 | 1007 | 17 years | |
| Śri Ajñadewi | – | Queen | Bali Kingdom | c. 1016 | Unknown | – | |
| Śri Maharaja Sakalendukirana Laksmidhara Wijayottunggadewi | – | Queen | Bali Kingdom | 1088 | 1101 | 13 years | |
| Arjayadengjayaketana | – | Queen | Bali Kingdom | 1181 | 1200 | 19 years | |
| Unknown queen (Note: In 1284, Kertanegara attacked Bali and captured the queen of Bali. Her name is unknown.) | – | Queen | Bali Kingdom | Unknown | 1284 | – | |
| Nyai Cili | – | Queen | Solor | 1646 | 1664 | 18 years | |
| Nyai Cili Muda | – | Queen | Solor | 1664 | 1686 | 22 years | |
| Bi Sonbai | – | Keizerin | Sonbai Kecil | 1672 | 1717 | 45 years | |
| Unknown Queen | – | Liurai | Wehali | c. 1732 | Unknown | – | |
| Daeng Sado | – | Queen | Pekat Kingdom | 1739 | Unknown | – | |
| Kamalat Syah | – | Sultana | Bima Sultanate | 1748 | 1751 | 3 years | |
| Siti Aisyah | – | Sultana | Sumbawa Sultanate | 1759 | 1761 | 2 years | |
| Shafiyatuddin | – | Sultana | Sumbawa Sultanate | 1791 | 1795 | 4 years | |
| Istri Kanya | – | Dewa Agung | Kingdom of Klungkung | 1814 | 1850 | 36 years | |
| Unknown Queen | – | Liurai | Wehali | c. 1814 | Unknown | – | |

====== Kingdom of Sikka ======
- Dona Maria (reigned c. 1613–c. 1620)
- Dona Inez (reigned c. 1613–c. 1620)

===== Kalimantan =====
| Monarch | Portrait | Office | State | Start of reign | End of reign | Length | Ref. |
|---|---|---|---|---|---|---|---|
| Ratu Sukadana | – | Queen | Kingdom of Matan | 1608 | 1622 | 14 years | |
| Aji Ragi | – | Queen | Kutai Kartanegara Sultanate | 1686 | 1700 | 14 years | |

====== Mempawah Kingdom ======
- Gusti Intan, also known as Ratu Permaisuri (reigned 1892–1902)

====== Paser Sultanate ======
Female rulers of the Paser Sultanate:

- Putri Di Dalam Petung (reigned 1516–?)

====== Tanah Bumbu Kingdom ======
Female rulers of the Tanah Bumbu Kingdom:

- Ratu Mas (reigned in the mid-18th century) – after her death, the kingdom was divided into several petty states, each with its own ruler
- Ratu Intan I (reigned in the late 18th century) – ruler of Cantung and Batulicin
- Gusti Besar (reigned in the early 19th century) – ruler of Bangkalaan, Sampanahan, Menungul, Cengal, Cantung, and Batulicin
- Aji Tukul, also known as Ratu Intan II (reigned in the mid-19th century) – ruler of Bangkalaan, Menungul, and Cengal

====== Tanjung Pematang Sawang Kingdom ======
Female rulers of the Tanjung Pematang Sawang Kingdom:

- Nyai Undang (reigned in the 14th century)

====== Tidung Kingdom ======
Female rulers of the Tidung Kingdom:

- Ikenawai (reigned 1542–1557)

===== Sulawesi =====
| Monarch | Portrait | Office | State | Start of reign | End of reign | Length | Ref. |
|---|---|---|---|---|---|---|---|
| Wa Kaa Kaa | – | Queen | Buton | 1332 | Unknown | – | |
| Bulawambona | – | Queen | Buton | 14th century | 14th century | – | |
| Tumanurung Baine | – | Queen | Gowa | c. 14th century | c. 14th century | – | |
| Tekkawanua | – | Datu | Kingdom of Soppeng | 1408 | 1438 | 30 years | |
| Benrigau' | – | Arumpone | Bone State | 1470 | 1490 | 20 years | |
| Tenri-Rawe | – | Datu | Kingdom of Luwu | 1571 | 1587 | 16 years | |
| Sambo | – | Queen | Kingdom of Tallo | 1576 | 1590 | 14 years | |
| Tenri-Tuppu | – | Arumpone | Bone State | 1602 | 1611 | 9 years | |
| Adang | – | Datu | Kingdom of Soppeng | 1654 | 1666 | 12 years | |
| Pattekke-Tana I | – | Datu | Tanette | 1690 | 1733 | 43 years | |
| Batari Tungke | – | Datu | Kingdom of Luwu | 1706 | 1715 | 9 years | |
| Batari Toja | – | Sultana | Bone State | 1714 | 1715 | 1 year | |
| Batari Toja | – | Sultana | Bone State | 1724 | 1738 | 14 years | |
| Batari Toja | – | Sultana | Bone State | 1741 | 1749 | 8 years | |
| Batari Toja | – | Datu | Kingdom of Luwu | 1715 | 1748 | 33 years | |
| Batari Toja | – | Datu | Kingdom of Soppeng | 1727 | 1737 | 10 years | |
| Batari Toja | – | Datu | Kingdom of Soppeng | 1742 | 1744 | 2 years | |
| Tenri-Leleang | – | Datu | Tanette | 1744 | 1750 | 6 years | |
| Tenri-Leleang | – | Datu | Kingdom of Luwu | 1748 | 1760 | 12 years | |
| Tenri-Leleang | – | Datu | Kingdom of Luwu | 1765 | 1778 | 13 years | |
| Sitti Saleh I | – | Sultana | Kingdom of Tallo | 1767 | 1777 | 10 years | |
| Tenri-Awaru I | – | Datu | Kingdom of Luwu | 1810 | 1825 | 15 years | |
| Tenri-Awaru I | – | Datu | Kingdom of Soppeng | 1820 | 1840 | 20 years | |
| Sitti Saleh II | – | Sultana | Kingdom of Tallo | 1814 | 1824 | 10 years | |
| Maniratu | – | Sultana | Bone State | 1823 | 1835 | 12 years | |
| Tanisanga | – | Datu | Tanette | 1824 | 1829 | 5 years | |
| Aisyah | – | Sultana | Kingdom of Tallo | 1845 | 1850 | 5 years | |
| Tenri-Olle | | Datu | Tanette | 1855 | 1910 | 55 years | |
| Tenri-Awaru II | – | Sultana | Bone State | 1857 | 1860 | 3 years | |
| Banrigau' | – | Sultana | Bone State | 1871 | 1895 | 24 years | |
| Sitti Zaenab | – | Datu | Kingdom of Soppeng | 1895 | 1940 | 45 years | |
| Kambo | | Datu | Kingdom of Luwu | 1901 | 1935 | 34 years | |
| Pancaitana | – | Datu | Tanette | 1910 | 1926 | 16 years | |
| Pattekke-Tana II | – | Datu | Tanette | 1926 | 1927 | 1 year | |

====== Bungku Kingdom ======
- Boki Panesi (reigned 1825–?)

====== Konawe Kingdom ======
Female rulers of the Konawe Kingdom:

- Wekoila (reigned c. 1150)

====== Lipukasi ======
- Queen of Lipukasi, name unknown (reigned c. 1814) – in 1814, John Crawfurd saw the female sovereign of the little state of Lipukasi; she was also the wife of the Macassar chief Kraing Lembang Parang, also spelled Karaeng Lembangparang, of Gowa-Tallo

====== Tagulandang Kingdom ======
Female rulers of the Tagulandang Kingdom:

- Ratu Leheraung (reigned 1570–1609)

===== Laos =====
| Monarch | Office | State | Start of reign | End of reign | Length |
|---|---|---|---|---|---|
| Nang Keo Phimpha | Queen | Lan Xang | 1438 | 1438 | Few months |

===== Myanmar =====
| Monarch | Picture | Office | State | Start of reign | End of reign | Length | Ref. |
|---|---|---|---|---|---|---|---|
| Kuverami | – | Queen | Waithali | 334 | 341 | 7 years | |
| Saw Yin Mi | – | Queen | Sandoway | 1420s | 1437 | | |
| Shin Sawbu | | Queen | Hanthawaddy | 1454 | 1471 | 17 years | |
| Wife of Sao Ne Ya | – | Saopha | Laihka State | 1680 | 1683 | 3 years | |
| Youngest Sister of Hkun Hkawt | – | Saopha | Laihka State | 1866 | 1868 | 2 years | |

====== Möng Mao ======
- Nang Ye Hkam Leng (Chinese: 南玉罕良), ruler of Möng Mao (reigned 1293–1310 or 1127–1152) – according to some sources, she succeeded her father Hkun Hpang Hkam (Chinese: 混芳罕)

====== Möng Sit ======
- Nang Li, ruler of Möng Sit (reigned 1873–1876)

====== Pangtara ======
- Mi Thit, ruler of Pangtara (reigned c. 1840s)
- Mi Sit, ruler of Pangtara (reigned c. 1840s)

===== Philippines =====
====== Pasig ======
- Dayang Kalangitan (reigned c. 1450–c. 1500)

====== Kingdom of Maynila ======
- Queen of Maynila, name unknown (reigned c. 1521) – she succeeded her husband Salalila and was succeeded by her son Matanda; according to oral traditions, her name is "Ysmeria"

====== Sultanate of Sulu ======
- Nur ul-Azam (reigned c. 1685)

===== Thailand =====
| Monarch | Portrait | Office | State | Start of reign | End of reign | Length of reign | Ref. |
|---|---|---|---|---|---|---|---|
| Jamadevi | | Queen | Hariphunchai | 662 or 659 | 669 or 679 or 688 | 7 or 17 or 29 years | |
| Chiraprapha | | Queen | Lanna | 1545 | 1546 | 1 year | |
| Wisutthi Thewi (Note: She ruled as a vassal queen under Burmese rule.) | — | Queen | Lanna | 1564 | 1578 | 14 years | |
| Ratu Hijau | | Queen | Patani | 1584 | 1616 | 32 years | |
| Ratu Biru | — | Queen | Patani | 1616 | 1624 | 8 years | |
| Ratu Ungu | — | Queen | Patani | 1624 | 1635 | 11 years | |
| Ratu Kuning | — | Queen | Patani | 1635 | 1651 | 16 years | |
| Raja Mas Kelantan | — | Raja | Patani | 1670 | 1698 | 28 years | |
| Raja Mas Chayam | — | Raja | Patani | 1698 | 1702 | 6 years (Total) | |
| Raja Mas Chayam | — | Raja | Patani | 1716 | 1718 | 6 years (Total) | |
| Raja Dewi | — | Raja | Patani | 1702 | 1711 | 9 years | |

===== Timor-Leste =====
There were many chiefdoms on Timor, but according to the hierarchy among the Timorese domains, the ruler of Sonbai of West Timor, the ruler of Wehali of Central Timor, and the ruler of Likusaen (today: Liquiçá) of East Timor were three paramount rulers of Timor.

====== Liquiçá ======
- Ursula da Costa (reigned c. 1818)
- Dona Gracia da Costa Rodrigues Pereira (reigned c. 1881 – c. 1883)
- Dona Engracia da Costa Delgado (reigned c. 1890 – c. 1892)

===== Vietnam =====
| Monarch | Portrait | Office | State | Start of reign | End of reign | Length |
|---|---|---|---|---|---|---|
| Trưng Trắc | | Queen | Jiaozhi | 40 | 43 | 3 years |
| Trưng Nhị | | Queen | Jiaozhi | 40 | 43 | 3 years |
| Triệu Ẩu | | Lady | Jiaozhou | 248 | 248 | Less than 1 year |
| Daughter of Kandarpadharma | – | Queen | Champa | Unknown | 653 | – |
| Lý Chiêu Hoàng | – | Empress | Đại Việt | 1224 | 1225 | 1 year |

==== West Asia ====
===== Iran =====
| Monarch | Portrait | Office | State | Start of reign | End of reign | Length | Ref. |
|---|---|---|---|---|---|---|---|
| Anzaze | | Basilissa | Elymais | c. 82 or 81 BCE | c. 75 BCE | c. 6 or 7 years | |
| Musa | | Basilissa | Parthian Empire | 2 BCE | 4 CE | 6 years | |
| Ulfan | – | Basilissa | Elymais | 2nd century CE | 2nd century CE | – | |
| Boran | | Banbishn | Sasanian Empire | 630 | 630 | Less than 1 year | |
| Boran | | Banbishn | Sasanian Empire | June 631 | June 632 | 1 year | |
| Azarmidokht | – | Banbishn | Sasanian Empire | 630 | 631 | 1 year | |
| Sulafa Khatun | – | Atabeg | Ahmadilis | 1209 | 1225 | 16 years | |
| Kutlugh Turkan | – | Khatun | Qutlugh-Khanids | 1257 | 1282 | 25 years | |
| Abish Khatun | – | Atabeg | Salghurids | 1264 | 1284 | 20 years | |
| Padishah Khatun | | Khatun | Qutlugh-Khanids | 1292 | 1295 | 3 years | |
| Kurdujin Khatun | – | Khatun | Qutlugh-Khanids | June or July 1295 | November 1295 | 4 or 5 months | |
| Kurdujin Khatun | – | Atabeg (disputed) | Salghurids | 1319 | 1338 | 19 years | |
| Dawlat Khatun | – | Atabeg | Khorshidi dynasty | 1316 | 1316 | – | |
| Sati Beg | – | Il khan | Ilkhanate | July or August 1338 | May 1339 | 9 or 10 months | |

===== Iraq =====
| Monarch | Portrait | Office | State | Start of reign | End of reign | Length |
|---|---|---|---|---|---|---|
| Puabi | | Nin | First Dynasty of Ur | c. 2600 BC | – | – |
| Tandu Khatun | – | Sultan | Jalayirid Sultanate | 1411 | 1419 | 8 years |
| Mir Xanzad | – | Mir | Soran Emirate | c. 1590 or c. 1620 | – | 7 years |

===== Israel and Palestine =====
| Monarch | Portrait | Office | State | Start of reign | End of reign | Length | Ref. |
|---|---|---|---|---|---|---|---|
| Lady of the Lions | – | Nin | Beit Shemesh | c. 1350 BC | – | – | |
| Athaliah | | Queen | Kingdom of Judah | c. 841 BC | c. 835 BC | 6 years | |
| Salome Alexandra | | Queen | Hasmonean dynasty | c. 76 BC | c. 67 BC | 9 years | |
| Salome I | – | Toparch | Herodian dynasty | 4 BC | 10 AD | 14 years | |
| Berenice | | Queen | Herodian dynasty | 48 | – | – | |
| Melisende | | Queen | Kingdom of Jerusalem | 1131 | 1153 | 22 years | |
| Sibylla | | Queen | Kingdom of Jerusalem | 1186 | 1190 | 4 years | |
| Isabella I | | Queen | Kingdom of Jerusalem | 1190 | 1205 | 15 years | |
| Maria | | Queen | Kingdom of Jerusalem | 1205 | 1212 | 7 years | |
| Isabella II | | Queen | Kingdom of Jerusalem | 1212 | 1228 | 16 years | |

===== Jordan =====
====== Gileadite ======
- Laodice of the Sameans (reigned c. 92 BC) – in the Codex Leidensis, the people of Laodice is Gileadites.

====== Nabataean Kingdom ======
The queens of the later Nabataean Kingdom appear alongside their husbands as co-rulers on their coinage.

- Chuldu (reigned 9 BC – 16 AD) – she ruled with her husband Aretas IV Philopatris
- Shaqilath (reigned 16–40 AD) – she ruled with her husband Aretas IV Philopatris
- Shaqilath II – she ruled with her husband Malichus II; after his death she was regent for her son Rabbel II Soter
- Gāmilat – she ruled with Rabbel II Soter
- Hagaru – she ruled with Rabbel II Soter

===== Lebanon =====
====== Tripoli ======
The County of Tripoli was an autonomous state.

- Lucia of Tripoli (reigned 1287–1289)

===== Saudi Arabia =====
====== Bāzu ======
- Iapa, queen of the city Dihrani (reigned c. 677/76 BCE) – Esarhaddon conquered eight kings and queens of the land Bāzu
- Baslu, queen of the city Ihilum (reigned c. 677/76 BCE) – Esarhaddon conquered eight kings and queens of the land Bāzu

====== Qedarite ======
- Zabibe (reigned c. 738 BCE)
- Samsi (reigned c. 733–715 BCE)
- Yatie (reigned c. 703 BCE)
- Te'el-hunu (reigned c. 690 BCE)
- Tabua (reigned c. 681–676 BCE)
- Adia (reigned c. 650–647 BCE)

===== Syria =====
| Monarch | Portrait | Title | State | Start of reign | End of reign | Length | Ref. |
|---|---|---|---|---|---|---|---|
| Cleopatra Thea | | Queen | Seleucid Empire | 126 BC | 121 BC | 5 years | |
| Cleopatra Selene I | | Queen | Seleucid Empire | 82 BC | 69 BC | 13 years | |
| Zenobia | | Empress | Palmyrene Empire | 272 | 272 | Less than 1 year | |
| Mavia | | Queen | Tanukhids | 375 | 425 | 50 years | |

===== Turkey =====
| Monarch | Portrait | Office | State | Start of reign | End of reign | Length | Ref. |
|---|---|---|---|---|---|---|---|
| Artemisia I (Note: She ruled as a satrap under Persia, but was also an autonomous queen.) | | Queen | Caria | c. 480 BC | – | – | |
| Mania (Note: She ruled as a sub-satrap under Persia, but was also an autonomous tyrant.) | | Tyrant | Dardanus | – | c. 399 BC | – | |
| Artemisia II | | Queen | Caria | 353 BC | 351 BC | 2 years | |
| Ada | | Queen | Caria | 344 BC | 340 BC | 4 years | |
| Ada | | Queen | Caria | 334 BC | 326 BC | 8 years | |
| Amastris | | Basilissa | Heraclea | c. 300 BC | c. 284 BC | c. 16 years | |
| Laodice | | Queen | Kingdom of Pontus | c. 162 BC | c. 150 BC | c. 12 years | |
| Orsabaris | | Queen | Prusias | c. 47 BC | c. 37 BC | c. 10 years | |
| Orodaltis | | Queen | Prusias | c. 37 BC | c. 31 BC | c. 6 years | |
| Aba | | Tyrant | Olba | c. Late 30s BC | – | – | |
| Pythodorida | | Queen | Kingdom of Pontus | 8 BC | 38 AD | 46 years | |
| Constance (Note: The Principality of Antioch was an autonomous state.) | | Princess | Principality of Antioch | 1130 | 1163 | 33 years | |
| Mama Hatun | | Melike | Saltukid dynasty | 1191 | 1200 | 9 years | |
| Isabella | | Queen | Armenian Kingdom of Cilicia | 1219 | 1252 | 33 years | |
| Tamta | | Ruler | Akhlat | 1245 | 1254 | 9 years | |
| Theodora | | Empress | Empire of Trebizond | 1284 | 1285 | 1 year | |
| Hudavend Hatun (Note: Hudavend Hatun, daughter of Kilij Arslan IV and widow of Arghun, was granted governance over Tokat and Niğde by the Ilkhanate, ruling as queen from 1292 until her death in 1332, and was buried in the Hudavend Hatun Turbe.) | | Queen | Tokat | 1292 | 1332 | 40 years | |
| Hudavend Hatun | | Queen | Niğde | 1292 | 1332 | 40 years | |
| Irene Palaiologina | | Empress | Empire of Trebizond | 1340 | 1341 | 1 year | |
| Anna | | Empress | Empire of Trebizond | 1341 | 1342 | 1 year | |

===== Yemen =====
| Monarch | Office | State | Start of reign | End of reign | Length | Ref. |
|---|---|---|---|---|---|---|
| Asma bint Shihab | Queen | Sulayhid dynasty | 1047 | 1087 | 40 years | |
| Arwa al-Sulayhi | Queen | Sulayhid dynasty | 1067 | 1138 | 71 years | |

==== Central Asia ====
===== Afghanistan =====
- Queen of Greater Yuezhi, name unknown (reigned in the 2nd century BC) – after the king of the Greater Yuezhi was killed by the Xiongnu, his wife became the new monarch of Greater Yuezhi

===== Uzbekistan and Kazakhstan =====
- Tomyris (reigned c. 570–520 BC) – queen of Massagetae

==== North Asia ====
===== Siberia =====
- Botohui-Tarhun (reigned in the 13th century) – queen of Khori-Tumed

=== Europe ===
==== Central Europe ====
===== Austria, Croatia, Czechia, and Hungary =====
| Monarch | Portrait | Office | State | Start of reign | End of reign | Length | Ref. |
|---|---|---|---|---|---|---|---|
| Fritigil | | Queen | Marcomanni | Late 4th century | – | – | |
| Mary (Note: She was crowned with the title of rex ("king").) | | Queen | Hungary | 10 September 1382 | December 1385 | 3 years and 4 months | |
| Mary | | Queen | Croatia | 10 September 1382 | December 1385 | 3 years and 4 months | |
| Mary | | Queen | Hungary | 24 February 1386 | 17 May 1395 | 9 years, 82 days | |
| Mary | | Queen | Croatia | 24 February 1386 | 17 May 1395 | 9 years, 82 days | |
| Maria Theresa (Note: She was also the titular Queen of Dalmatia, but at the time, it was actually under Venetian rule.) | | Archduchess | Austria | 20 October 1740 | 29 November 1780 | 40 years, 40 days | |
| Maria Theresa | | Queen | Hungary | 20 October 1740 | 29 November 1780 | 40 years, 40 days | |
| Maria Theresa | | Queen | Croatia | 20 October 1740 | 29 November 1780 | 40 years, 40 days | |
| Maria Theresa | | Queen | Slavonia | 20 October 1740 | 29 November 1780 | 40 years, 40 days | |
| Maria Theresa | | Queen | Bohemia | 20 October 1740 | 19 December 1741 | 1 year, 60 days | |
| Maria Theresa | | Queen | Bohemia | 12 May 1743 | 29 November 1780 | 37 years, 201 days | |

===== Germany =====
According to Sarah Röttger, within the Holy Roman Empire, the princess-abbesses of the four Stifte—Herford, Quedlinburg, Essen, and Gandersheim—stood on an equal footing with bishops. With the Peace of Westphalia of 1648, (Note: The states within the Holy Roman Empire were granted a degree of sovereignty by the Peace of Westphalia of 1648.) the existence of the ecclesiastical states was enshrined in the Imperial Constitution.

====== Essen Abbey ======
- Anna Salome von Salm-Reifferscheid (reigned 1648–1688) – her reign began before 1648, but the ecclesiastical state was not granted a degree of sovereignty until the Peace of Westphalia in 1648
- Anna Salome of Manderscheid-Blankenheim (reigned 1688–1691)
- Bernhardine Sophia of East Frisia and Rietberg (reigned 1691–1726)
- Francisca Christina of Pfalz-Sulzbach (reigned 1726–1776)
- Maria Kunigunde of Saxony (reigned 1776–1802)

====== Gandersheim Abbey ======
- Catharina Elisabeth (reigned 1648–1649) – her reign began before 1648, but the ecclesiastical state was not granted a degree of sovereignty until the Peace of Westphalia in 1648
- Maria Sabina (reigned 1650–1665)
- Dorothea Hedwig (reigned 1665–1678)
- Christine Sophie (reigned 1678–1681)
- Christina II (reigned 1681–1693)
- Henriette Christine (reigned 1693–1712)
- Marie Elisabeth (reigned 1712–1713)
- Elisabeth Ernestine Antonie (reigned 1713–1766)
- Therese Natalie (reigned 1767–1778)
- Augusta Dorothea (reigned 1778–1802)

====== Herford Abbey ======
- Sidonia (reigned 1648–1649) – her reign began before 1648, but the ecclesiastical state was not granted a degree of sovereignty until the Peace of Westphalia in 1648
- Elisabeth II (reigned 1649–1667)
- Elisabeth III (reigned 1667–1680)
- Elisabeth IV (reigned 1680–1686)
- Elisabeth V (reigned 1686–1688)
- Charlotte Sophia (reigned 1688–1728)
- Johanna Charlotte (reigned 1729–1750)
- Sophia (reigned 1750–1764)
- Frederica Charlotte (reigned 1764–1802)

====== Quedlinburg Abbey ======
- Anna Sophia I (reigned 1648–1680) – her reign began before 1648, but the ecclesiastical state was not granted a degree of sovereignty until the Peace of Westphalia in 1648
- Anna Sophia II (reigned 1681–1683)
- Anna Dorothea (reigned 1684–1704)
- Marie Elisabeth (reigned 1718–1755)
- Anna Amalia (reigned 1756–1787)
- Sophia Albertina (reigned 1787–1803)

===== Poland =====
| Monarch | Portrait | Office | State | Start of reign | End of reign | Length | Ref. |
|---|---|---|---|---|---|---|---|
| Jadwiga | | Queen | Poland | 16 October 1384 | 17 July 1399 | 14 years, 274 days | |
| Anna | | Queen | Poland | 15 December 1575 | 19 August 1587 | 11 years, 247 days | |

===== Switzerland =====
| Monarch | Portrait | Office | State | Start of reign | End of reign | Length of reign | Ref. |
|---|---|---|---|---|---|---|---|
| Marie de Nemours | | Princess | Principality of Neuchâtel | 1694 | 1707 | 13 years | |

==== Eastern Europe ====
===== Belarus =====
| Monarch | Portrait | Office | State | Start of reign | End of reign | Length | Ref. |
|---|---|---|---|---|---|---|---|
| Uliana (Note: The Principality of Vitebsk was inherited into the Grand Duchy of Lithuania in 1320 but retained its independence until 1393, when it became a viceroyalty.) | | Princess | Principality of Vitebsk | 1377 | 1391 | 14 years | |

===== Georgia, Armenia, and Azerbaijan =====
| Monarch | Portrait | Office | State | Start of reign | End of reign | Length | Ref. |
|---|---|---|---|---|---|---|---|
| Erato | | Queen | Kingdom of Armenia | 8 BC | 5 BC | 3 years | |
| Erato | | Queen | Kingdom of Armenia | 2 BC | 2 AD | 4 years | |
| Erato | | Queen | Kingdom of Armenia | 6 AD | 12 AD | 6 years | |
| Shahandukht II (Note: She was the sister and co-ruler of Senekerim.) | — | Queen | Kingdom of Syunik | 1072 | 1094 or 1096 | 22 or 24 years | |
| Dinar | | Queen | Kingdom of Hereti | — | c. 1010s | — | |
| Tamar I (Note: She was also the suzerain of Zakarid Armenia, an Armenian state, and the Kingdom of Shirvan, a Persianized state located in modern-day Azerbaijan.) | | Mepe | Kingdom of Georgia | 27 March 1184 | 18 January 1213 | 28 years, 297 days | |
| Dop (Note: Following the death of her husband Prince Hasan I Dopian, Princess Dop became the ruler, leading her descendants to adopt her name and style themselves as Dopians.) | — | Princess | Principality of Khachen | c. early 13th-century | — | — | |
| Rusudan | | Mepe | Kingdom of Georgia | 18 January 1223 | 1245 | 22 years | |
| Tamar II | – | Queen | Kingdom of Kartli | 1744 | 12 April 1746 | 2 years | |

===== Russia =====
| Monarch | Portrait | Office | State | Start of reign | End of reign | Length | Ref. |
|---|---|---|---|---|---|---|---|
| Camasarye Philotecnus | – | Queen | Bosporan Kingdom | c. 180 BC | c. 150 BC | c. 30 years | |
| Dynamis | | Queen | Bosporan Kingdom | 47 BC | 47 BC | Less than 1 year | |
| Dynamis | | Queen | Bosporan Kingdom | 44 BC | 13 BC | 31 years | |
| Dynamis | | Queen | Bosporan Kingdom | 8 BC | 8 AD | 16 years | |
| Gepaepyris | – | Queen | Bosporan Kingdom | 37 or 38 | 39 | 1 or 2 years | |
| Boa | – | Queen | Sabir people | 520s | – | – | |
| Maria-Anastasia (Note: The Principality of Yaroslavl was an independent principality.) | – | Princess | Principality of Yaroslavl | 1257 | c. 1280s | – | |
| Tulun Beg | – | Khanum | Blue Horde | 1370 | 1371 | 1 year | |
| Bika-khanum | – | Khanum | Matrega | 1419 | – | – | |
| Fatima Soltan | – | Khanbika | Qasim Khanate | 1679 | 1681 | 2 years | |
| Irina Godunova | | Tsaritsa (disputed) | Tsardom of Russia | 26 January 1598 | 3 March 1598 | 36 days | |
| Catherine I | | Empress | Russian Empire | 8 February 1725 | 17 May 1727 | 2 years, 98 days | |
| Anna | | Empress | Russian Empire | 26 February 1730 | 28 October 1740 | 10 years, 245 days | |
| Elizabeth | | Empress | Russian Empire | 6 December 1741 | 5 January 1762 | 20 years, 30 days | |
| Catherine II | | Empress | Russian Empire | 9 July 1762 | 17 November 1796 | 34 years, 131 days | |
| Ummu Kulsum-beke | – | Khanum | Gazikumukh Khanate | 1838 | 1841 | 3 years | |

===== Ukraine =====
| Monarch | Portrait | Office | State | Start of reign | End of reign | Length | Ref. |
|---|---|---|---|---|---|---|---|
| Maria Theresa | | Queen | Kingdom of Galicia and Lodomeria | 1772 | 1780 | 8 years | |

==== Northern Europe ====
===== Denmark, Norway and Sweden =====
| Monarch | Portrait | Office | State | Start of reign | End of reign | Length of reign | Ref. |
|---|---|---|---|---|---|---|---|
| Åsa | – | Queen | Agder | c. 814 | c. 834 | 20 years | |
| Margaret I | | Queen | Denmark | 10 August 1387 | 28 October 1412 | 25 years, 79 days | |
| Margaret I | | Queen | Norway | 2 February 1388 | 28 October 1412 | 24 years, 269 days | |
| Margaret I | | Queen | Sweden | 24 February 1389 | 28 October 1412 | 23 years, 247 days | |
| Christina | | Queen | Sweden | 16 November 1632 | 16 June 1654 | 21 years, 212 days | |
| Ulrika Eleonora | | Queen | Sweden | 5 December 1718 | 29 February 1720 | 1 year, 86 days | |
| Margrethe II | | Queen | Denmark | 14 January 1972 | 14 January 2024 | 52 years, 0 days | |

===== Finland =====
- Queen of the Sitones in Kvenland, name unknown (reigned c. 98) – she is mentioned in Tacitus's book Germania

===== Lithuania =====
| Monarch | Portrait | Office | State | Start of reign | End of reign | Length | Ref. |
|---|---|---|---|---|---|---|---|
| Anna | | Grand Duchess | Lithuania | 15 December 1575 | 19 August 1587 | 11 years, 247 days | |

==== Western Europe ====
===== France =====
In the 17th century, there were several noble families who, by right of possession of a sovereign territory, were recognised by the Kingdom of France as princes étrangers.

- Charlotte de La Marck, Princess regnant of the Principality of Sedan (reigned 1588–1594) – the principality was a sovereign from the mid-16th century
- Marie, Princess regnant of the Principality of Dombes (reigned 1608–1627) – the principality was a sovereign from the mid-16th century
- Anne Marie Louise d'Orléans, Princess regnant of the Principality of Dombes (reigned 1627–1693) – the principality was a sovereign from the mid-16th century
- Isabeau Chenu, Queen of the Kingdom of Yvetot (reigned as queen 1518–1553) – it was a small kingdom within the Kingdom of France; she co-ruled with her husband Martin du Bellay from 1532; her title of queen was recognized by Francis I in 1543; no longer permitted to bear the royal title after 1553, she ruled as a princess until 1589
- Marie de Sully, Princess regnant of the Principality of Boisbelle (reigned 1382–1409/1410) – the principality was an independent allod
- Marie d'Albret, Princess regnant of the Principality of Boisbelle (reigned 1524–1549) – the principality was an independent allod
- Henriette of Cleves, Princess regnant of the Principality of Boisbelle (reigned 1564–1601) – the principality was an independent allod

===== Luxembourg and Belgium =====
| Monarch | Portrait | Office | State | Start of reign | End of reign | Length of reign | Ref. |
|---|---|---|---|---|---|---|---|
| Mary of Burgundy (Note: According to E. William Monter's book, Mary of Burgundy and Isabella Clara Eugenia are included in the list of thirty women sovereigns over European states between 1300 and 1800.) | | Duchess | Burgundian Netherlands | 5 January 1477 | 27 March 1482 | 5 years, 81 days | |
| Isabella Clara Eugenia (Note: During her and Albert's co-reign period, the Spanish Netherlands temporarily had formal independence from Spain.) | | Duchess | Spanish Netherlands | 6 May 1598 | 13 July 1621 | 23 years, 68 days | |
| Maria Theresa (Note: She was also the sovereign of many other states as ruler of the Habsburg monarchy.) | | Duchess | Austrian Netherlands | 20 October 1740 | 29 November 1780 | 40 years, 40 days | |
| Marie-Adélaïde | | Grand Duchess | Luxembourg | 25 February 1912 | 14 January 1919 | 6 years, 323 days | |
| Charlotte | | Grand Duchess | Luxembourg | 14 January 1919 | 12 November 1964 | 45 years, 303 days | |

===== Netherlands =====
| Monarch | Portrait | Office | State | Start of reign | End of reign | Length of reign | Ref. |
|---|---|---|---|---|---|---|---|
| Wilhelmina | | Queen | Netherlands | 23 November 1890 | 4 September 1948 | 57 years, 286 days | |
| Juliana | | Queen | Netherlands | 4 September 1948 | 30 April 1980 | 31 years, 239 days | |
| Beatrix | | Queen | Netherlands | 30 April 1980 | 30 April 2013 | 33 years, 0 days | |

===== Monaco =====
France recognized the sovereignty of the Lordship of Monaco in 1489 and the sovereignty of the Principality of Monaco in 1641.

| Monarch | Portrait | Office | State | Start of reign | End of reign | Length of reign | Ref. |
|---|---|---|---|---|---|---|---|
| Claudine | | Lady | Monaco | July 1457 | 19 November 1515 | 58 years | |
| Louise Hippolyte | | Princess | Monaco | 20 February 1731 | 29 December 1731 | 312 days | |

===== United Kingdom and Ireland =====
Including England and Scotland before the union of 1707. Wales as an independent state never had a female monarch.

| Monarch | Portrait | Office | State | Start of reign | End of reign | Length | Ref. |
|---|---|---|---|---|---|---|---|
| Cartimandua | | Queen | Brigantes | c. 43 | c. 69 | c. 25 years | |
| Boudica | | Queen | Iceni | c. 60 | c. 61 | c. 1 year | |
| Seaxburh | – | Queen | Wessex | c. 672 | c. 674 | c. 2 years | |
| Æthelflæd | | Lady | Mercia | 911 | 918 | c. 7 years | |
| Ælfwynn | – | Lady | Mercia | 12 June 918 | 4 December 918 | 175 days | |
| Matilda | | Lady (disputed) | England | 8 April 1141 | 1148 | c. 7 years | |
| Margaret | | Queen (disputed) | Scotland | 19 March 1286 | September 1290 | 4 years, 6 months | |
| Mary | | Queen | Scotland | 14 December 1542 | 24 July 1567 | 24 years, 222 days | |
| Jane | | Queen (disputed) | England | 10 July 1553 | 19 July 1553 | 9 days | |
| Jane | | Queen (disputed) | Ireland | 10 July 1553 | 19 July 1553 | 9 days | |
| Mary I | | Queen | England | 24 July 1553 | 17 November 1558 | 5 years, 116 days | |
| Mary I | | Queen | Ireland | 24 July 1553 | 17 November 1558 | 5 years, 116 days | |
| Elizabeth I | | Queen | England | 17 November 1558 | 24 March 1603 | 44 years, 127 days | |
| Elizabeth I | | Queen | Ireland | 17 November 1558 | 24 March 1603 | 44 years, 127 days | |
| Mary II | | Queen | England | 13 February 1689 | 28 December 1694 | 5 years, 318 days | |
| Mary II | | Queen | Ireland | 13 February 1689 | 28 December 1694 | 5 years, 318 days | |
| Mary II | | Queen | Scotland | 11 April 1689 | 28 December 1694 | 5 years, 261 days | |
| Anne | | Queen | England | 8 March 1702 | 1 May 1707 | 5 years, 54 days | |
| Anne | | Queen | Scotland | 8 March 1702 | 1 May 1707 | 5 years, 54 days | |
| Anne | | Queen | Ireland | 8 March 1702 | 1 August 1714 | 12 years, 146 days | |
| Anne | | Queen | Great Britain | 1 May 1707 | 1 August 1714 | 7 years, 92 days | |
| Victoria | | Queen | United Kingdom | 20 June 1837 | 22 January 1901 | 63 years, 216 days | |
| Elizabeth II | | Queen | United Kingdom | 6 February 1952 | 8 September 2022 | 70 years, 214 days | |

====== Picts ======
- Pictish Queen, name unknown (reigned c. 617) – in 617, she summoned pirates to massacre Donnán and his companions on the island of Eigg; she is the only woman ruler mentioned in early Scottish history

==== Southern Europe ====
===== Albania =====
| Monarch | Title | State | Start of reign | End of reign | Length |
|---|---|---|---|---|---|
| Caeria | Queen | Illyrians | Unknown | 344 or 343 BC | – |
| Joanna | Duchess | Duchy of Durrës | 1348 | 1368 | 20 years |
| Joanna | Duchess | Duchy of Durrës | 1376 | 1383 | 7 years |
| Helena Thopia (Note: With the fall of the Serbian Empire after 1355, for a period Albania were ruled by local chieftains. In the 14th and 15th centuries Ottoman Empire conquered the sovereign Albanian principalities.) | Lady | Principality of Albania | 1388 | 1392 | 4 years |
| Helena Thopia | Lady | Principality of Albania | 1394 | 1403 | 9 years |
| Comita Muzaka | Lady | Principality of Vlorë | 1385 | 1396 | 11 years |
| Rugjina Balsha | Lady | Principality of Vlorë | 1414 | 1417 | 3 years |

===== Bosnia =====
| Monarch | Title | State | Start of reign | End of reign | Length |
|---|---|---|---|---|---|
| Jelena Gruba | Queen | Kingdom of Bosnia | 1395 | 1398 | 3 years |

===== Bulgaria =====
====== Odrysian kingdom ======
- Antonia Tryphaena (reigned 18–38) – she ruled with her son Rhoemetalces II
- Pythodoris II (reigned 38–46) – she ruled with Rhoemetalces III

===== Cyprus =====
| Monarch | Portrait | Office | State | Start of reign | End of reign | Length |
|---|---|---|---|---|---|---|
| Charlotte | | Queen | Kingdom of Cyprus | 28 July 1458 | 1464 | 6 years |
| Catherine Cornaro | | Queen | Kingdom of Cyprus | 26 August 1474 | 26 February 1489 | 14 years, 184 days |

===== Greece =====
| Monarch | Portrait | Office | State | Start of reign | End of reign | Length | Ref. |
|---|---|---|---|---|---|---|---|
| Thargelia | | Tyrant | Pharsalus | c. 510 BC | c. 480 BC | 30 years | |
| Cratesipolis | | Tyrant | Sicyon | 314 BC | 308 BC | 6 years | |
| Cratesipolis | | Tyrant | Corinth | 314 BC | 308 BC | 6 years | |
| Nicaea | | Tyrant | Corinth | 247 BC | 245 or 244 BC | 2 or 3 years | |
| Deidamia II | | Queen | Kingdom of Epirus | 234 BC | 233 BC | 1 year | |
| Irene of Athens | | Empress | Byzantine Empire | 15 January 792 | 31 October 802 | 10 years, 289 days | |
| Thekla | | Empress | Byzantine Empire | 842 | 856 | 14 years | |
| Zoe Porphyrogenita | | Empress | Byzantine Empire | 21 April 1042 | 11 June 1042 | 51 days | |
| Theodora Porphyrogenita | | Empress | Byzantine Empire | 21 April 1042 | 31 August 1056 | 14 years, 132 days | |
| Eudokia Makrembolitissa | | Empress (disputed) | Byzantine Empire | 22/23 May 1067 | 31 December 1067 | 223 days | |
| Eudokia Makrembolitissa | | Empress (disputed) | Byzantine Empire | 1 October 1071 | 1 November 1071 | 31 days | |
| Yolanda | | Empress (disputed) | Latin Empire | 1217 | September 1219 | 2 years | |
| Catherine I (Note: The Latin Empire was disestablished in 1261, but Latin states in Greece, also known as Frankokratia, continued to recognize Latin emperors in exile as their overlords until 1383.) | | Empress | Latin states in Greece | 15 December 1283 | 11 October 1307 | 23 years, 300 days | |
| Irene of Montferrat (Note: She was an autonomous ruler. Two Byzantine empresses reigned with autonomy in Thessalonica.) | | Empress | Thessalonica | 1303 | 1317 | 14 years | |
| Catherine II | | Empress | Latin states in Greece | 11 October 1307 | October 1346 | c. 39 years | |
| Anna of Savoy | | Empress | Thessalonica | 1351 | 1365 | 14 years | |
| Helena of Bulgaria (Note: She built up her own autonomous principality.) | | Tsaritsa | Principality of Serres | 1355 | 1365 | 10 years | |
| Maria Angelina | | Basilissa | Despotate of Epirus | 23 December 1384 | February 1385 | 2 months | |

===== Italy =====
| Monarch | Portrait | Office | State | Start of reign | End of reign | Length of reign | Ref. |
|---|---|---|---|---|---|---|---|
| Amalasuintha | | Queen | Ostrogothic Kingdom | 2 October 534 | 30 April 535 | 210 days | |
| Elena of Gallura | | Judge | Judicate of Gallura | 1203 | 1218 | approx. 15 years | |
| Benedetta of Cagliari | | Judge | Judicate of Cagliari | 1214 | 1233 | approx. 9 years | |
| Adelasia of Torres | | Judge | Judicate of Logudoro | 1236 | 1259 | approx. 23 years | |
| Joanna of Gallura (Note: She was also a titular Judge of Gallura in 1308–1339. The Republic of Pisa's possession of the Judicate of Gallura became definitive in 1308.) | | Judge | Judicate of Gallura | 1296 | 1308 | approx. 12 years | |
| Eleanor of Arborea | | Judge | Judicate of Arborea | 1383 | June 1404 | approx. 21 years | |
| Constance I of Sicily | | Queen | Kingdom of Sicily | 25 December 1194 | 27 November 1198 | 3 years, 337 days | |
| Constance II of Sicily | | Queen | Kingdom of Sicily | 1282 | 1285 | approx. 3 years | |
| Joanna I of Naples | | Queen | Kingdom of Naples | 20 January 1343 | 25 August 1381 | 38 years, 217 days | |
| Maria of Sicily | | Queen | Kingdom of Sicily | 27 July 1377 | 25 May 1401 | 23 years, 302 days | |
| Joanna II of Naples | | Queen | Kingdom of Naples | 6 August 1414 | 2 February 1435 | 20 years, 180 days | |
| Joanna of Castile | | Queen | Kingdom of Sicily | 23 January 1516 | 12 April 1555 | 39 years, 79 days | |
| Joanna of Castile | | Queen | Kingdom of Naples | 23 January 1516 | 12 April 1555 | 39 years, 79 days | |
| Joanna of Castile | | Queen | Kingdom of Sardinia | 23 January 1516 | 12 April 1555 | 39 years, 79 days | |
| Olimpia | | Princess | Principality of Piombino | 1700 | 1700 | Less than 1 year | |
| Ippolita | | Princess | Principality of Piombino | 27 January 1701 | 29 December 1733 | 32 years, 336 days | |
| Maria Teresa Cybo-Malaspina | | Duchess | Duchy of Massa | 18 August 1731 | 29 December 1790 | 59 years, 133 days | |
| Maria Teresa Cybo-Malaspina | | Princess | Principality of Carrara | 18 August 1731 | 29 December 1790 | 59 years, 133 days | |
| Eleonora | | Princess | Principality of Piombino | 1733 | 1745 | 12 years | |
| Maria Theresa | | Duchess | Duchy of Parma and Piacenza | 20 October 1740 | 18 October 1748 | 7 years, 364 days | |
| Maria Theresa | | Duchess | Duchy of Milan | 20 October 1740 | 29 November 1780 | 40 years, 40 days | |
| Maria Beatrice d'Este (Note: She was fully sovereign only during her second reign, because the Holy Roman Empire's Kingdom of Italy still existed during her first reign.) | | Duchess | Duchy of Massa | 29 December 1790 | 30 June 1796 | 5 years, 184 days | |
| Maria Beatrice d'Este | | Princess | Principality of Carrara | 29 December 1790 | 30 June 1796 | 5 years, 184 days | |
| Maria Beatrice d'Este | | Duchess | Duchy of Massa | 9 June 1815 | 14 November 1829 | 14 years, 158 days | |
| Maria Beatrice d'Este | | Princess | Principality of Carrara | 9 June 1815 | 14 November 1829 | 14 years, 158 days | |
| Elisa Bonaparte (Note: She was de facto her brother Napoleon's puppet ruler, but de jure a sovereign.) | | Princess | Principality of Lucca and Piombino | 19 March 1805 | 18 March 1814 | 8 years, 364 days | |
| Elisa Bonaparte | | Grand Duchess | Grand Duchy of Tuscany | 3 March 1809 | 1 February 1814 | 4 years, 335 days | |
| Pauline Bonaparte | | Duchess | Duchy of Guastalla | 30 March 1806 | 14 August 1806 | 137 days | |
| Marie Louise (Note: She reigned as an independent duchess. The Italian duchies, restored by the Congress of Vienna, became fully sovereign, because the Holy Roman Empire's Kingdom of Italy was not restored.) | | Duchess | Duchy of Parma and Piacenza | 11 April 1814 | 17 December 1847 | 33 years, 250 days | |
| Marie Louise | | Duchess | Duchy of Guastalla | 11 April 1814 | 17 December 1847 | 33 years, 250 days | |
| Maria Luisa of Spain | | Duchess | Duchy of Lucca | 9 June 1815 | 13 March 1824 | 8 years, 278 days | |

===== Portugal =====
| Monarch | Portrait | Office | State | Start of reign | End of reign | Length | Ref. |
|---|---|---|---|---|---|---|---|
| Theresa | | Queen (disputed) | Portugal | 1116 | 24 June 1128 | approx. 12 years | |
| Beatrice | | Queen (disputed) | Portugal | 1383 | 1385 | approx. 2 years | |
| Maria I | | Queen | Portugal | 24 February 1777 | 20 March 1816 | 39 years, 25 days | |
| Maria II | | Queen | Portugal | 2 May 1826 | 23 June 1828 | 2 years, 52 days | |
| Maria II | | Queen | Portugal | 26 May 1834 | 15 November 1853 | 19 years, 173 days | |

===== Romania =====
| Monarch | Portrait | Office | State | Start of reign | End of reign | Length | Ref. |
|---|---|---|---|---|---|---|---|
| Catherine (Note: Transylvania, as an Ottoman tributary state, enjoyed autonomy.) | | Princess | Transylvania | 15 November 1629 | 21 September 1630 | 310 days | |
| Maria Theresa (Note: Habsburg-ruled Transylvania, according to the Diploma Leopoldinum, was a separate state from the Kingdom of Hungary.) | | Princess | Transylvania | 1740 | 1765 | 25 years | |
| Maria Theresa | | Grand Princess | Transylvania | 1765 | 1780 | 15 years | |

===== Spain and Andorra =====
- Toda of Pamplona (reigned c. 958) – queen of Deio and Lizarrara
- Andregoto Galíndez (reigned c. 971) – queen of Lumbier
- Tota of Ribagorza (reigned 1003–1010) – independent countess of Ribagorza
- Mayor García of Castile (reigned 1010–1025) – independent countess of Ribagorza

| Monarch | Portrait | Office | State | Start of reign | End of reign | Length | Ref. |
|---|---|---|---|---|---|---|---|
| Jimena Díaz | | Princess | Principality of Valencia | 1099 | 1102 | | |
| Urraca | | Empress | Hispania | 30 June 1109 | 8 March 1126 | 16 years, 251 days | |
| Urraca | | Queen | León | 30 June 1109 | 8 March 1126 | 16 years, 251 days | |
| Urraca | | Queen | Castile | 30 June 1109 | 8 March 1126 | 16 years, 251 days | |
| Urraca | | Queen | Galicia | 30 June 1109 | 1111 | | |
| Petronilla | | Queen | Aragon | 13 November 1137 | 18 July 1164 | 26 years, 248 days | |
| Urraca the Asturian | | Queen | Kingdom of Artajona | 1144 | 1153 | | |
| Berengaria | | Queen | Castile | 6 June 1217 | 31 August 1217 | 86 days | |
| Berengaria | | Queen | Toledo | 6 June 1217 | 31 August 1217 | 86 days | |
| Sancha | | Queen | León | 24 September 1230 | 11 December 1230 | 78 days | |
| Sancha | | Queen | Galicia | 24 September 1230 | 11 December 1230 | 78 days | |
| Dulce | | Queen | León | 24 September 1230 | 11 December 1230 | 78 days | |
| Dulce | | Queen | Galicia | 24 September 1230 | 11 December 1230 | 78 days | |
| Joan I | | Queen | Navarre | 22 July 1284 | 2 April 1305 | 20 years, 254 days | |
| Joan II | | Queen | Navarre | 1 April 1328 | 6 October 1349 | 21 years, 188 days | |
| Isabella of Foix-Castelbon | | Co-Princess | Andorra | 1398 | 1412 | | |
| Blanche I | | Queen | Navarre | 8 September 1425 | 1 April 1441 | 15 years, 205 days | |
| Blanche II | | Queen | Navarre | 23 September 1461 | 2 December 1464 | 3 years, 70 days | |
| Isabella I | | Queen | Castile | 11 December 1474 | 26 November 1504 | 29 years, 351 days | |
| Isabella I | | Queen | León | 11 December 1474 | 26 November 1504 | 29 years, 351 days | |
| Eleanor | | Queen | Navarre | 28 January 1479 | 12 February 1479 | 15 days | |
| Catherine | | Queen | Navarre | 7 January 1483 | 12 February 1517 | 34 years, 36 days | |
| Catherine | | Co-Princess | Andorra | 7 January 1483 | 12 February 1517 | 34 years, 36 days | |
| Joanna the Mad | | Queen | Castile | 26 November 1504 | 12 April 1555 | 50 years, 137 days | |
| Joanna the Mad | | Queen | Aragon | 23 January 1516 | 12 April 1555 | 39 years, 79 days | |
| Joanna the Mad | | Queen | Upper Navarre | 23 January 1516 | 12 April 1555 | 39 years, 79 days | |
| Jeanne d'Albret | | Queen | Lower Navarre | 25 May 1555 | 9 June 1572 | 17 years, 15 days | |
| Jeanne d'Albret | | Co-Princess | Andorra | 25 May 1555 | 9 June 1572 | 17 years, 15 days | |
| Isabella II | | Queen | Spain | 29 September 1833 | 30 September 1868 | 35 years, 1 day | |
| Isabella II | | Queen | Upper Navarre | 29 September 1833 | 30 November 1833 | 62 days | |

===== Malta =====
| Monarch | Portrait | Office | State | Start of reign | End of reign | Length | Ref. |
|---|---|---|---|---|---|---|---|
| Elizabeth II | | Queen | Malta | 21 September 1964 | 13 December 1974 | 10 years, 83 days | |

===== Montenegro =====
| Monarch | Portrait | Office | State | Start of reign | End of reign | Length |
|---|---|---|---|---|---|---|
| Neda | – | Kneginja | Duklja | 1043 | 1046 | 3 years |
| Desislava | – | Kneginja (disputed) | Duklja | 1186 | 1189 | 3 years |

=== Oceania ===
==== Australasia ====
===== Australia =====
| Monarch | Portrait | Office | State | Start of reign | End of reign | Length | Ref. |
|---|---|---|---|---|---|---|---|
| Victoria (Note: Australia became a dominion by the Federation of Australia in 1901.) | | Queen | Australia | 1901 | 1901 | Less than 1 year | |
| Elizabeth II | | Queen | Australia | 1952 | 2022 | 70 years | |

===== New Zealand =====
| Monarch | Portrait | Office | State | Start of reign | End of reign | Length |
|---|---|---|---|---|---|---|
| Makea Takau Ariki (Note: After 1888, when the Kingdom of Rarotonga became a British protectorate, she reigned as a non-sovereign monarch.) | | Queen | Kingdom of Rarotonga | 1871 | 1911 | 40 years |
| Elizabeth II | | Queen | New Zealand | 1952 | 2022 | 70 years |

==== Melanesia ====
===== Fiji, Papua New Guinea and Solomon Islands =====
| Monarch | Portrait | Office | State | Start of reign | End of reign | Length | Ref. |
|---|---|---|---|---|---|---|---|
| Elizabeth II | | Tui Viti | Fiji | 1970 | 1987 | 17 years | |
| Elizabeth II | | Queen | Papua New Guinea | 1975 | 2022 | 47 years | |
| Elizabeth II | | Queen | Solomon Islands | 1978 | 2022 | 44 years | |

==== Polynesia ====
===== American Samoa =====
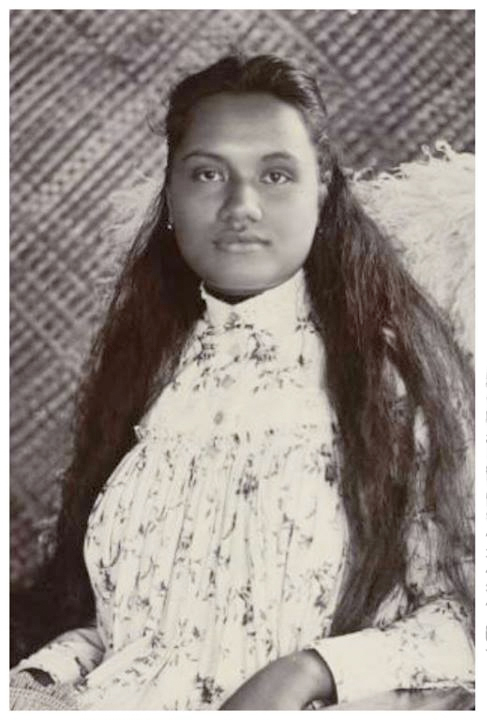
Tui Manuʻa Matelita.

- Tuimanufili (reigned as 20th Tui Manu'a)
- Siliave (reigned as 23rd Tui Manu'a)
- Seuea (reigned as 27th Tui Manu'a)
- Matelita (reigned 1891–1895, as 39th Tui Manu'a)

===== French Polynesia =====
====== Bora Bora ======
- Teriimaevarua II (reigned 1860–1873)
- Teriimaevarua III (reigned 1873–1895)

====== Huahine ======
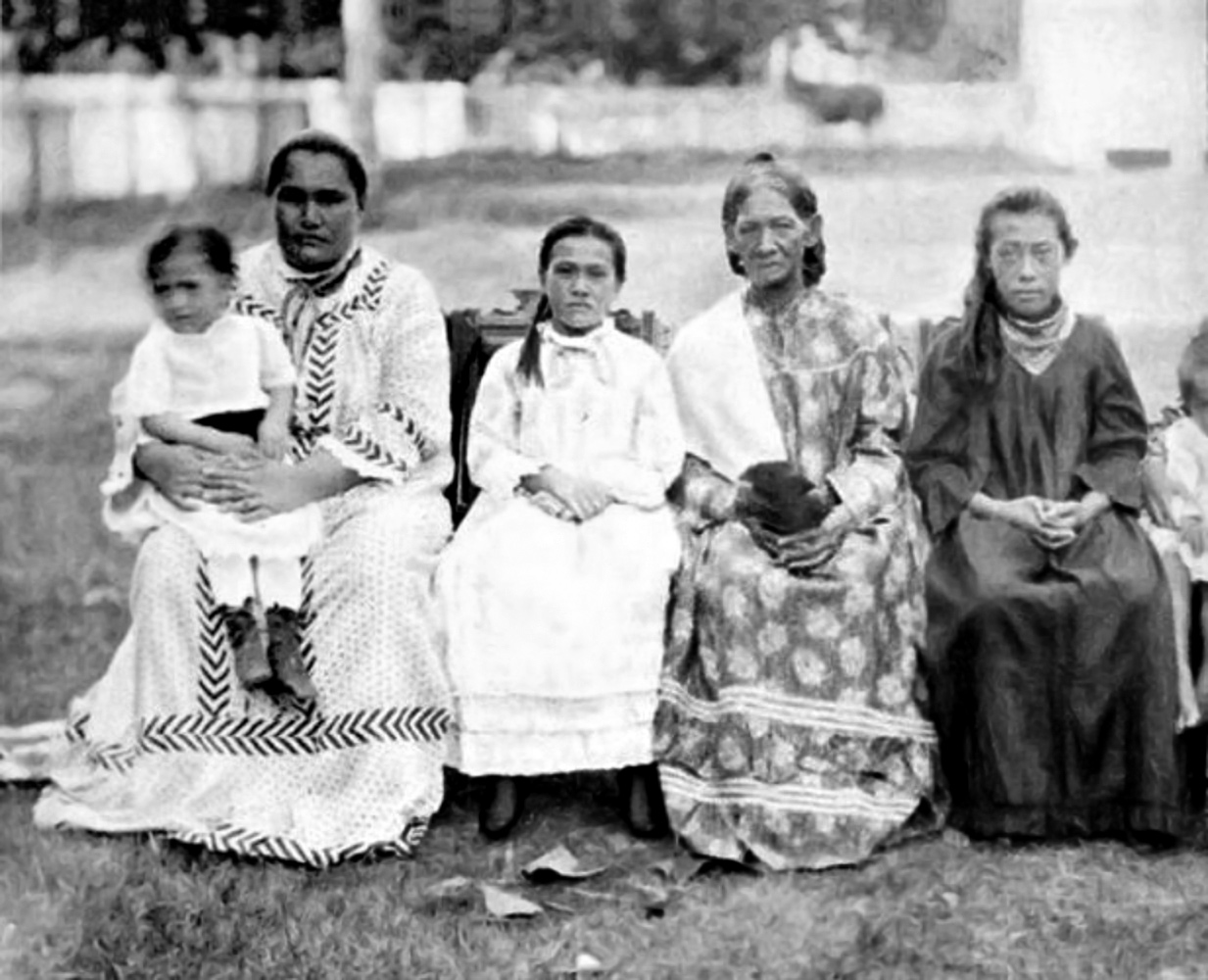
Tehaapapa II and Tehaapapa III

- Teri'itaria II (reigned 1815–1852)
- Teha'apapa II (reigned 1868–1893)
- Teuhe (reigned 1888–1890) – she reigned under a rebellion government against her mother Queen Tehaapapa II
- Teha'apapa III (reigned 1893–1895)

====== Raiatea ======
- Tehauroarii (reigned 1881–1884)
- Tuarii (reigned till 1897) – she reigned under a rebellion government against the French with the support of Teraupo'o after Tamatoa VI abdicated.

====== Rapa Iti ======
- Daughter of Parima (reigned ?–1887)

====== Rimatara ======
- Tamaeva IV (reigned 1876–1892)
- Tamaeva V (reigned 1892–1901)

====== Tahiti ======
- Purea (reigned in the 18th century), queen of the Teva clan on the southern part of the island before unification
- Pōmare IV (reigned 1827–1877)

====== Nuku Hiva ======
- Vaekehu – her husband died in 1863, but Vaekehu continued to reign on her own as Queen

===== Hawaii =====
====== Hilo ======
- Ululani, 7th Chiefess of Hilo

====== Ko'olau ======
- Hinakaimauli'awa, 2nd Chiefess of Ko'olau
- Mualani, 3rd Chiefess of Ko'olau
- Kaimihauoku, 7th Chiefess of Ko'olau
- Holaulani (Kauaohalaulani), 16th Chiefess of Ko'olau
- Ipuwai-o-Hoalani, 19th Chiefess of Ko'olau

====== Molokai ======
- Kapau-a-Nuʻakea, 3rd Chiefess of Molokai
- Kamauliwahine, 4th Chiefess of Molokai
- Hualani, 5th Chiefess of Molokai
- Kanealai, Chiefess of Molokai (reigned during the 18th century)

====== Oʻahu ======
- Kūkaniloko, 11th Moʻi of Oʻahu
- Kalaimanuia, 12th Moʻi of Oʻahu (reigned 1600–1665)

====== Hawaiʻi Island ======
- Kaikilani, 17th Moʻi of Hawaiʻi Island (reigned 1575–1605)
- Keakamahana, 19th Moʻi of Hawaiʻi Island (reigned 1635–1665)
- Keakealaniwahine, 20th Moʻi of Hawaiʻi Island (reigned 1665–1695)
- Kalanikauleleiaiwi, 21st Moʻi of Hawaiʻi Island (reigned 1695–1725) – co-ruler with her brother Keaweʻīkekahialiʻiokamoku

====== Kauaʻi ======
- Kamakahelei, 22nd Moʻi of Kauaʻi (reigned 1770–1794)

====== Kingdom of Hawaii ======
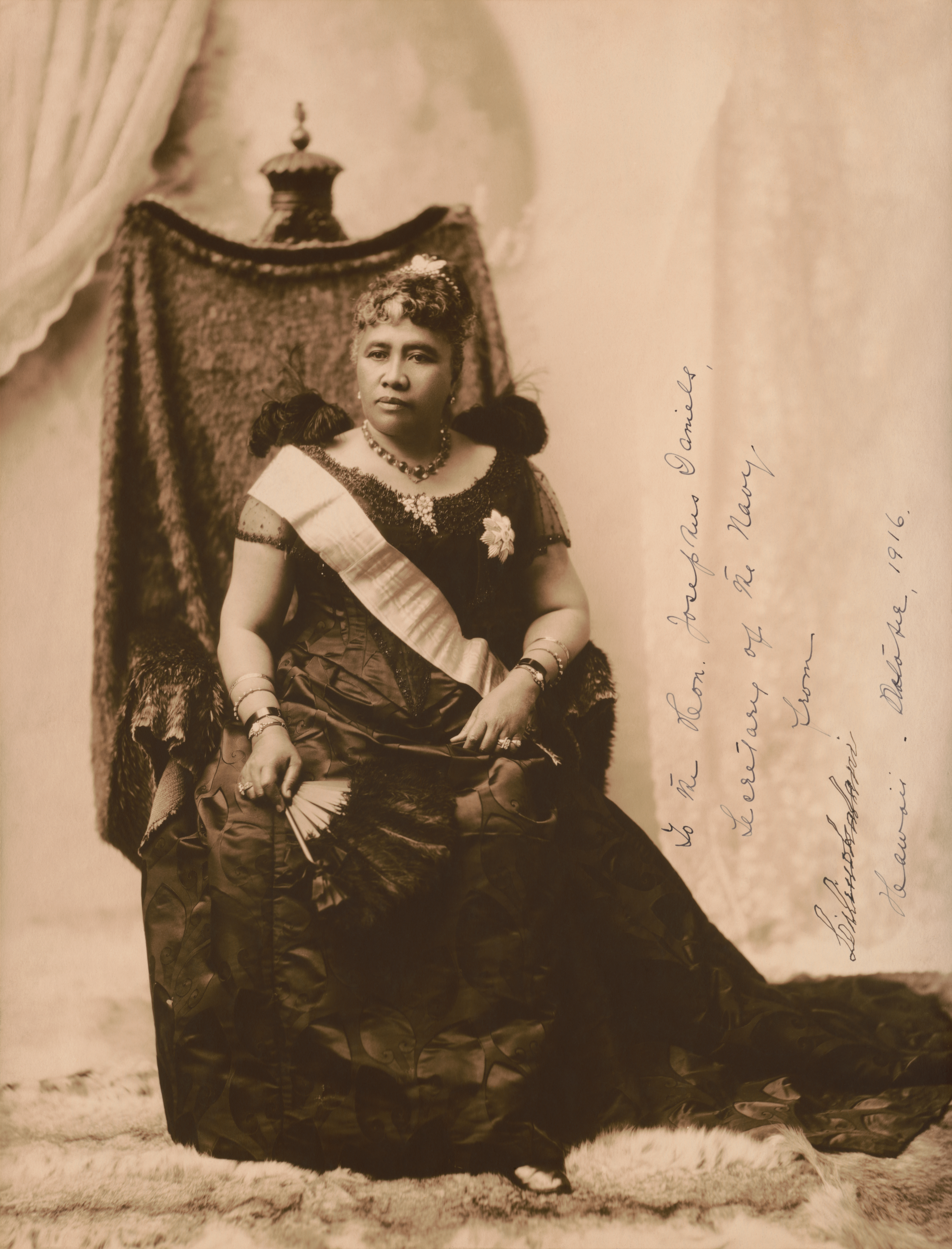
Liliʻuokalani

- Liliʻuokalani (reigned 1891–1893 and claimed status as queen until her death in 1917) – the only queen regnant of the Kingdom of Hawaii established by Kamehameha I

===== Tonga =====
- Tupoumahe'ofo (reigned 1777–1781, as Tu'i Kanokupolu)
- Salote Tupou III (reigned 1918–1965)

===== Tuvalu =====
| Monarch | Portrait | Office | State | Start of reign | End of reign | Length |
|---|---|---|---|---|---|---|
| Elizabeth II | | Queen | Tuvalu | 1978 | 2022 | 44 years |

===== Wallis and Futuna =====
====== Uvea ======
- Toifale (reigned 1825–1829)
- Falakika Seilala (reigned 1858–1869)
- Amelia Tokagahahau Aliki (reigned 1869–1895)
- Aloisia Brial (reigned 1953–1958)

== Legendary and mythological monarchs ==
=== Chad ===
- Hu of Kanem

=== Chile ===
- Gaboimilla

=== China ===
- Nüwa, the only female among Three Sovereigns and Five Emperors
- Queen Mother of the West
- Queen of the Aini people (爱尼人), a branch of the Hani people
- Queen Nánshēng (南生) of the De'ang people

=== Congo-Kinshasa ===
==== Kuba Kingdom ====
Women written in italics in the list of Kuba Kingdom rulers:

- Lobamba
- Gokare
- Sanga Motunu
- Pelama Pena
- Boeke
- Sanga Lenga
- Bosh Akama
- Kele Kama
- Bolueme

=== Czechia ===
- Libuše, female ruler of the Bohemians
- Valasca

=== Denmark ===
- Asa – she was described in Chronicon Lethrense
- Hethae – she was described in Chronicon Lethrense

=== Easter Island ===
- Vakai, queen of Kingdom of Rapa Nui

=== Ecuador ===
- Paccha Duchicela, queen of the Kingdom of Quito

=== Egypt ===
- Nitocris of the Sixth Dynasty – Nitocris is mentioned within Herodotus' book Histories as being the last Pharaoh of the Sixth Dynasty of Egypt.
- Charoba – A queen mentioned in a history of Egypt written by 12th-century Arab writer Murtada ibn al-'Afif.
- Daluka of the Soleyman Dynasty – An Antediluvian monarch from medieval Coptic and Arabic texts who supposedly built a wall around Egypt to protect the country from invasion and also was said to have built a pyramid and a nilometer at Memphis. Sometimes claimed to be a cousin of Charoba and her immediate successor.
- Borsa of the Soleyman Dynasty – Mentioned in medieval Coptic and Arabic texts as a ruler of Egypt in the Antediluvian era. Sometimes described as a "priestess".

=== Ethiopia ===
The following names all come from a regnal list written in 1922, which is partially based on native traditions and older regnal lists, but also contains additional names of Coptic and Nubian origin, the latter due to its association with the word "Aethiopia" in ancient and Biblical texts. Claimed dates follow the Ethiopian calendar.

- Borsa (reigned 4321–4254 BC) – Originated from Coptic tradition.
- Eylouka (reigned 3776–3731 BC) – Originated from Coptic tradition.
- Nehasset Nais (reigned 2434–2404 BC)
- Kasiyope (reigned 1890–1871 BC) – Originated from Greek mythology.
- Mumazes (reigned 1675–1671 BC) – Daughter of king Bonu I.
- Aruas (reigned 1671 BC) – Daughter of Mumazes.
- Helena (reigned 1358–1347 BC)
- Makeda (reigned 1013–982 BC) – The Biblical queen of Sheba in Ethiopian tradition and mother of Menelik I. She succeeded to the throne after the death of her father king Kawnasya.
- Nicauta Kandake I (reigned 740–730 BC)
- Hadina (reigned 372–362 BC) – Most regnal lists of Ethiopia claim this monarch reigned for 9 years.
- Nikawla Kandake II (reigned 342–332 BC) – An alternate name for the Queen of Sheba
- Akawsis Kandake III (reigned 325–315 BC)
- Nikosis Kandake IV (reigned 242–232 BC)
- Awsena (reigned 99–88 BC) – Most regnal lists of Ethiopia claim this monarch reigned for 1 year.
- Nicotnis Kandake V (reigned 35–25 BC)
- Garsemot Kandake VI (reigned 40–50 AD) – Supposedly the Kandake from the Biblical story of the Ethiopian Eunuch.
- Wakana (reigned 230 AD) – Reigned for 2 days.
- Ahywa Sofya (reigned 299–332 AD) – Likely based on Sofya of Axum, mother of Ezana.
- Adhana I (reigned 369–374 AD) – Some regnal lists of Ethiopia claim this monarch reigned for 14 years.
- Adhana II (reigned 412–418 AD) – Some regnal lists claim this monarch co-ruled with king Abreha III.

==== Kingdom of Simien ====
- Gudit (reigned c. 960 – c. 1000)

==== Sidama people ====
- Furra

=== Finland ===
- Louhi

=== French Polynesia ===
- Queen Mamea

=== Greece ===
- Omphale of Lydia, wife of Heracles
- Gerana, queen of Pygmy
- Callidice of Thesprotia

==== Amazons ====
- Otrera, the daughter of Eurus (the east wind)
- Hippolyta, the Amazonian queen who possessed a magical girdle
- Penthesilea, the daughter of Ares and Otrera and the sister of Hippolyta, Antiope and Melanippe
- Antianara, the daughter of Ares and Otrera and the sister of Hippolyta, Antiope and Melanippe
- Eurypyle
- Lampedo
- Marpesia
- Aegea
- Myrina
- Orithyia
- Antiope
- Thalestris

=== Iceland ===
- Brunhild – in the Nibelungenlied, she is first presented as the ruling queen of Iceland

=== India ===
- Yashovati, ruler of Kashmir – she was described in Rajatarangini
- Pandaie
- Queen Ratta – she is mentioned in Rajatarangini; she was the Karnata queen ruling Dakshinapatha who met Lalitaditya Muktapida
- Pramila, queen of the land of women
- Kamala – one of the two queens of Stri-Rajya, the enchanted kingdom of women
- Mangala – one of the two queens of Stri-Rajya, the enchanted kingdom of women

=== Indonesia ===
- Mahisa Suramardini Warmandewi, queen of Salakanagara (reigned 276–289 AD)
- Sphatikarnawa Warmandewi, queen of Salakanagara (reigned 340–348 AD)

=== Iran ===
- Humay Chehrzad

=== Iraq ===
- Kubaba of Kish, the only queen on the Sumerian King List (reigned in the 25th century BC)
- Semiramis of Assyria, claimed to be Shammuramat
- Nitocris of Babylon, the ruling queen of Babylon described by Herodotus in his Histories
- Queen Zidam – according to the legend of Bayajidda, she conquered Baghdad

=== Ireland ===
- Macha, (reigned 661–654 BC)
- Medb, Queen of Connacht

=== Japan ===
- Empress Jingū (reigned 201–269)
- Princess Iitoyo (reigned 484; disputed)
- Kamu-nashi-hime (神夏磯媛), female Tsuchigumo of Hōfu-shi (防府市)
- Hayatsuhime (速津媛), female Tsuchigumo of Hayami-gun (速見郡)
- Taburatsuhime (田油津媛), female Tsuchigumo of Yamato-gun (山門郡)
- Sanai Isoba, ruler of Yonaguni
- Oyasu (阿屋須), ruler of Emishi

=== Korea ===
- Lady Saso, honorary queen regnant of Silla
- Queen of Jeoknyeo-guk – Talhae's mother was the princess of Jeoknyeo-guk (Korean: 적녀국; Hanja: 積女國), an island country where only women lived
- Queen of Tamna – she is mentioned in the legend of Mountain Shrine and Lady Shring in the Bongnae Mountain (봉래산 산제당과 아씨당)
- Hongranyeo (Korean: 홍라녀; Hanja: 紅羅女) – according to the legend of Yeowangjwagangsanhyeong (Korean: 여왕좌강산형; Hanja: 女王坐江山型), she became the monarch of Balhae

=== Libya ===
- Cyrene, queen of the city Cyrene
- Lamia, queen of Libya

=== Malaysia ===
| Monarch | Portrait | Office | State | Start of reign | End of reign | Length |
|---|---|---|---|---|---|---|
| Siti Wan Kembang | | Queen | Kelantan | 1610 | 1667 | 57 years |
| Puteri Saadong | | Queen | Kelantan | 1667 | 1671 | 4 years |

=== Mexico ===
==== Tenochtitlan ====
- Ilancueitl (disputed)
- Atotoztli II (reigned 1466–1472, disputed)

=== Myanmar ===
- Panhtwar

=== Norway ===
- Lagertha

=== Pakistan ===
- Nur Bakht Khatun of Trakhan Dynasty
- the Dareli queen of Trakhan Dynasty

=== Peru ===
- Mama Waqu Quya, mother and predecessor of Manco Cápac as ruler of Inca people according to Felipe Guaman Poma de Ayala
- Catalina Huanca

=== Poland ===
- Wanda

=== Russia ===
- Narchat

=== Somaliland ===
- Arawelo
- Kola, queen of Abasa

=== South Africa ===
- Majaji (reigned c. 350 AD)

=== Spain ===
- Queen Lupa

=== Sri Lanka ===
- Kuveni, queen of Yakkha people of Sri Lanka before the founding of Kingdom of Tambapanni
- Alli Raani

=== Sudan ===
- Pelekh Candace of Meroë (reigned c. 345 – c. 332 BC)

=== Syria ===
- al-Zabba', claimed to be Zenobia

=== Tunisia ===
- Dido (reigned 814–c. 760 BC) – also known as Alyssa. Founder of Carthage, according to tradition

=== Turkey ===
- Onomaris, Queen of the Galatians
- Queen of Kanesh

=== Turkmenistan ===
- Zarinaea, legendary Sacae woman ruler of the Dahae

=== Uganda ===
| Monarch | Portrait | Office | State | Start of reign | End of reign | Length | Ref. |
|---|---|---|---|---|---|---|---|
| Kudidi (Note: She is known to Ethiopians as Gudit.) | – | Empress | Chwezi Empire | 950 | 990 | 40 years | |
| Nyakahongerwa | – | Empress | Chwezi Empire | 1000 | 1025 | 25 years | |
| Kogyere I Rusija-Miryango | – | Empress | Chwezi Empire | 1075 | 1085 | 40 years | |
| Kogyere I Rusija-Miryango | – | Empress | Chwezi Empire | 1090 | 1120 | 40 years | |
| Kogyere II | – | Empress | Chwezi Empire | 1120 | 1130 | 10 years | |
| Njunaki Kamaranga | – | Empress | Chwezi Empire | 1250 | 1280 | 30 years | |

=== United Kingdom ===
- Queen Gwendolen (reigned in the 11th century BC)
- Queen Cordelia (reigned in the 8th century BC)
- Queen Marcia (reigned in the 4th century BC)
- Hermuthruda

=== Vatican City ===
- Pope Joan, legendary monarch of the Papal States

=== Vietnam ===
- Lady Po Nagar of Champa, According to Cham legend, was the founder of the Cham nation

=== Yemen ===
- Bilkis in Yemen, claimed to be Queen of Sheba

=== Zambia ===
- Mwambwa – she is mentioned in the Lozi mythology
- Mbuyu – she is mentioned in the Lozi mythology

== Self-proclaimed monarchs ==
=== China ===
- Chen Shuozhen (reigned 653) – She led a peasant uprising in 653. During the rebellion, she declared herself huangdi. Jian Bozan recognized her as a female huangdi.
- Mǐlǔ (Chinese: 米魯), also known as "Invincible Tian Wang (無敵天王)" – female rebel leader to assume the title of Tian Wang (天王)

=== Easter Island ===
- Koreto, reigning queen of Easter Island (reigned c. 1873–1876) – Dutrou-Bornier married Koreto and appointed her as Queen
- Caroline, reigning queen of Easter Island (reigned 1876–1877) – after the death of Dutrou-Bornier, his widow Koreto briefly installed their daughter Caroline as Queen

=== Guinea ===
- Niara Bely

=== Guinea-Bissau ===
- Aurelia Correia

=== Haiti ===
- Ti Memenne of La Gonâve (reigned c. 1920s) – she was the tribal ruler of La Gonâve

=== India ===
- Rani Gaidinliu, leader of the Naga people

=== Italy ===
- Nina Menegatto

=== Jamaica ===
- Queen Nanny, leader of the Jamaican Maroons

=== Korea ===
- Yi Hae-won, titular empress regnant of Korean Empire

=== Myanmar ===
- Olive Yang of Kokang

=== New Zealand ===
- Te Atairangikaahu, Māori queen (reigned 1966–2006)
- Nga wai hono i te po, Māori queen (reigned 2024–present)

=== Panama ===
- Rufina Santana, queen of Naso people (reigned 1982–1988)

=== Senegal ===
- Aline Sitoe Diatta, Queen of Kabrousse

=== Trinidad and Tobago ===
The list of Carib Queens were:

- Delores MacDavid
- Maria Fuentes Werges Ojea
- Edith Martinez
- Justa Werges
- Valentina Medina
- Jennifer Cassar
- Nona Aquan

=== United States of America ===
- Verdiacee Goston, empress of the Washitaw Nation

== Chieftainesses ==
=== Argentina ===
- Juana Koslay (princess)
- Isabel Pallamay, Cacica of the Quilme people (reigned 1708–1718)

=== Australia ===
- Cora Gooseberry (reigned 1830–1852)

=== Botswana ===
- Kgosi Basadi Seipone III
- Kgosi Rebecca Banika
- Mosadi Muriel Seboko (reigned 2002–present), the kgosikgolo of the Balete people

=== Brazil ===
- Juma Xipaia of the Xipaya people (reigned 2015–present)
- Mandei Juma of the Juma people
- Borea Juma of the Juma people
- Ajareaty Waiapi of Waiapi

=== Burkina Faso ===
- Wemba Poko, female chief of Wemtenga (reigned in the 13th century)

=== Burundi ===
- Nandabunga

=== Cameroon ===
- Nkunkuma Marie-Louise Zoa of Okoa
- Marie-Thérèse Assiga Ahanda
- Michèle Gaëlle Mahouve

=== Canada ===
- Marilyn Baptiste
- Elsie Knott
- Gwendolyn Lucy O'Soup Crane
- Sacha Labillois-Kennedy
- Bev Sellars
- Marie-Anne Day Walker-Pelletier
- Viola Wyse
- Victoria Young of Giluts'aaw

=== Central African Republic ===
- Natélégé, woman chief of the village Sawala (reigned ?–c. 1900)

=== Chile ===
- María la Grande
- Janequeo
- Elvira de Talagante

=== China ===
- Bǐtóngqián (Chinese: 比铜钳), female chieftain of the Shāohé (燒何) tribe of the Ancient Qiang (reigned c. 57)
- Lady Xian, female chieftain of the Lǐ people (俚人), an ancestral group associated with the later Lí people (黎族)
- Huang Shi (Chinese: 黃氏), female chieftain of the Lí people (黎族) (reigned ?–1181) – mother of Wang Erniang
- Wang Erniang (Chinese: 王二娘), female chieftain of the Lí people (黎族) (reigned 1181–1216)
- Wu Shi (Chinese: 吳氏), female chieftain of the Lí people (黎族) (reigned 1216–?) – daughter of Wang Erniang
- Chogi (Korean: 초기; Hanja: 椒箕), female chieftain of the Mancha (만차; 蔓遮) tribe of the Jianzhou Jurchens (reigned c. 1596)
- Ziji Drolma (Tibetan: གཟི་བརྗིད་སྒྲོལ་མ།, Wylie: Gzi brjid sgrol ma; Chinese: 斯吉卓玛), Golok Queen of the Hongmaocang (红毛仓) tribe of the Golok people (reigned c. 1893 – c. 1917)
- Lude (Tibetan: ཀླུ་སྡེས།, Wylie: Klu sdes; Chinese: 鲁德), Golok Queen of the Hongmaocang (红毛仓) tribe of the Golok people (reigned c. 1917–1933/35)
- Maliya Suo, the last female chieftain of the Aoluguya tribe of the Evenki people (reigned ?–2022)

=== Colombia ===
- Gaitana

=== Congo-Brazzaville ===
- Ngalifourou, Chef de canton of the Tio Kingdom (reigned 1918–1956)

=== Dominican Republic ===
- Higuanamá, also spelled Hiquanama, Cacica of Higüey, one of the Chiefdoms of Hispaniola (reigned ?–1502) – she was described by Las Casas in his A Short Account of the Destruction of the Indies; Juan de Esquivel hanged Higuanamá in 1502
- doña María de Higüey, Cacica of Higüey (reigned c. 1514)
- Isabel de Iguanama, Cacica of Higüey (reigned c. 1514)

=== Ecuador ===
- Juana Guare

=== Ethiopia ===
- Diso Obo Warqe, female ruler of the Nonno Jebat tribe of Macca (reigned in the c. late 19th century)

=== Fiji ===
- Lala Mara, the Roko Tui Dreketi of Rewa (reigned 1957–2004)
- Teimumu Kepa, the Roko Tui Dreketi of Rewa (reigned 2004–present)

=== Gabon ===
- Virginie Ambougou, Oga (queen) of the Assiga clan (reigned c. 1961)

=== Ghana ===
- Gundonaa Samata Abudu
- Nana Kofi Abuna V
- Nana Oye Mansa Yeboaa
- Peggielene Bartels

=== Haiti ===
- Anacaona, Cacica of Jaragua, one of the Chiefdoms of Hispaniola

=== Iceland ===
- Aud the Deep-Minded, Ringkvinna who settled in Dalasýsla

=== India ===
- Banaitangi, ruler of the western Lushai Sailo family
- Ropuiliani, ruler of the southern Lushai Hills
- Gauri of the Kolar chiefship

=== Ireland ===
- Grace O'Malley, also known as "the Pirate Queen", chieftainess of the Ó Máille clan in Umaill

=== Israel ===
- Deborah, the only female judge of Israelite tribes in Biblical judges

=== Kenya ===
- Wangu wa Makeri

=== Korea ===
- Chieftainess buried in Jeongchon Tomb (정촌고분)

=== Kyrgyzstan ===
- Kurmanjan Datka, tribal leader of the Alay Kyrgyz (reigned 1862–1895)

=== Liberia ===
- Mary Larteh
- Suah Koko

=== Malawi ===
- Theresa Kachindamoto

=== Malaysia ===
- Tok Temong, female chief of Temong in Hulu Perak (reigned c. 1528)
- Datuk Puteri Siti Awan I, female Undang of Johol (reigned 1723–1747)
- Datuk Rambut Panjang, female Undang of Johol (reigned 1747–1760)
- Datuk Puteri Siti Awan II, female Undang of Johol (reigned 1760–1790)

=== Marshall Islands ===
- Dorothy Tarjikit Laelan Kabua, paramount chief of Majuro (reigned c. 1953–c. 1954)
- Atama Zedkaia, paramount chief (Leroijlaplap) of Majuro (reigned c. 2001–2010)
- Libinnirok, Leroijlaplap of Mejit (reigned c. 1900s)

=== Mongolia ===
- Great Beyiji (Chinese: 大嬖只) (reigned c. 1580s) – a Mongol female chieftain who resided outside the Great Wall at Gubeikou (古北口)
- Monkejin (Chinese: 猛可真) (reigned c. 1580s) – a Mongol female chieftain who resided outside the Great Wall at Malanyu (馬蘭峪)

=== Morocco ===
- Chamsi az-Ziwawiya, caïda of the Bani Yznaten tribe in the Rif region (reigned c. 1337)
- Rqia bent Hadidou, caïda of the Aït Zedeg tribe in the Rif region (reigned c. 1880s)

=== New Zealand ===
==== Māori people ====
- Hine-i-paketia
- Hinematioro

==== Rarotonga ====
- Makea Te Vaerua Ariki, High Chiefess of Te Au O Tonga (reigned 1845–1857)
- Pa Upoko Takau Ariki, High Chiefess of Takitumu (reigned 1855–1890)
- Tinomana Mereana Ariki, High Chiefess of Puaikura (reigned 1881–1908)

=== Niger ===
- Sarraounia

=== Nigeria ===
- Abibatu Mogaji, Ìyál'ọ́jà of Lagos
- Abiola Dosunmu, Erelu Kuti of Lagos
- Agbani Darego, Oloye of Lagos
- Ahebi Ugbabe, Eze of Enugu-Ezike
- Alaba Lawson, Iyalode of Yorubaland
- Aminatu Abiodun, Iyalode of Ibadan
- Efunroye Tinubu, Iyalode of Egbaland
- Efunsetan Aniwura, Iyalode of Ibadan
- Funmilayo Ransome-Kuti, Oloye of Yorubaland
- Laduntan Oyekanmi, Iyalode of Ibadan
- Wuraola Esan, Iyalode of Ibadan

=== Palau ===
- Ngerdoko, Bilung of Koror (reigned ?–1975)
- Gloria Salii, Bilung of Koror (reigned 1975–)

=== Panama ===
- Silvia Carrera

=== Papua New Guinea ===
- Koloka of Naara (reigned c. 1884 – c. 1910)

=== Peru ===
- Capillana, Capullana of a northern part of Peru
- Tomasa Tito Condemayta

=== Puerto Rico ===
- Luisa, also known as Yuisa, Cacica of Loíza (reigned ?–1513)

=== Rwanda ===
- Nyirakigwene Dancilla, Umutwarekazi ("female chief") of Nduga (reigned in the early 20th century)

=== Sierra Leone ===
- Nyarroh of the Barri Chiefdom
- Daughter of Nyarroh of the Barri Chiefdom
- Madam Nenge of the Baoma Chiefdom
- Madam Matolo of the Nongowa Chiefdom
- Humonya of the Nongowa Chiefdom
- Ella Koblo Gulama of the Kaiyamba Chiefdom
- Madam Mamawa Benya of the Small Bo Chiefdom
- Madam Theresa Vibbie of Kandu Leppiam Chiefdom

=== South Africa ===
- Phylia Nwamitwa II
- Queen Hoho of Khoekhoe (reigned c. 1750)

=== South Sudan ===
- Mathiang Yak Anek

=== Suriname ===
- Joan van der Bosch
- Grace Watamaleo
- Muriël Fernandes
- Dorothy Marius-Lambert

=== Sweden ===
- Princess of Öland

=== Taiwan ===
- Lian-lei (Chinese: 蘭雷), female chieftain of the Xīnwǔlǐ (心武里) tribe of the Paiwan people (reigned ?–1723)
- Older Sister of Láolǐruǎn (勞里阮), name unknown, female chieftain of the Máoxìxì (毛系系) tribe of the Paiwan people (reigned c. 1723–c. 1735)
- Wife of Jiǔliú (久留), name unknown, female chieftain of the Jiābèng (加泵) tribe of the Paiwan people (reigned c. 1727)
- Leng-leng (Chinese: 冷冷), female chieftain of the Jiābèng (加泵) tribe of the Paiwan people (reigned c. 1768)

=== Tanzania ===
- Therese Ntare VI of Heru

=== Togo ===
- Marie-Claude Lovisa, also known as Queen Mawulolo, queen of the village Lovisa-Kope (reigned 2004–present)

=== Uganda ===
The female chiefs, Murogo and her female descendants, worked for the Ankole kings for several generation in the Ibanda area.

- Murogo of Ibanda (reigned in the early 19th century)
- Nyabuzana of Ibanda (reigned in the mid-19th century)
- Kishokye of Ibanda (reigned ?–1903)
- Julia Kibubura of Ibanda (reigned 1903–1926)

=== United States of America ===
- Askamaboo
- Oholasc
- Quaiapen, also known as Old Queen
- Squaw Sachem of Mistick, also known as Massachusetts Queene
- Edith Turner
- Phyliss J. Anderson
- Zara Cisco Brough
- Sharon Bryant
- Alice Brown Davis
- Joyce Dugan
- Lucy Tayiah Eads
- Eagle Woman
- Robbie Hedges
- Cheryll Toney Holley
- Viola Jimulla
- Wilma Mankiller
- G. Anne Richardson
- Wah-Pah-Ho-Ko
- Glenna Wallace
- Opossunoquonuske, also known as Queen of Appamatuck
- The Lady of Cofitachequi
- Pine Leaf
- Glory of the Morning
- Cockacoeske of Pamunkey
- Queen Betty of Pamunkey
- Queen Ann of Pamunkey
- Weetamoo
- Awashonks
- Queen Alliquippa
- Queen of Wayonaoake, name unknown (reigned c. 1677) – she was one of the Native American leaders who signed the Treaty of 1677
- Tabbity Abby of Accomac
- Mary of Accomac
- Queen of Pungoteague, name unknown (reigned c. 1705) – she was mentioned by Robert Beverley in 1705
- Weunquesh of Narragansett – she succeeded her father Ninigret
- Queen Esther of Narragansett

=== Vanuatu ===
- Motarilavoa Hilda Lin̄i

=== Venezuela ===
- Apacuana
- Isabel (cacica)
- Orocomay
- Urimare (cacica)
- Ana Soto (cacica)

=== Yemen ===
- Sharifa Fatima

=== Zambia ===
In the Lozi kingdom, Mboanjikana, the female chieftainship of Libonda, is third in royal rank after the King (Litunga) and the Queen of the South (Litunga la Mboela).

- Njikana, Mboanjikana of Libonda – sister of the Litunga Mboo
- Akatoka, Mboanjikana of Libonda (reigned 1878–1950)
- Makwibi, Mboanjikana of Libonda (reigned 1951–1959) – she is the same person as the Litunga la Mboela Makwibi
- Lundambuyu, Mboanjikana of Libonda (reigned 1959–1995)
- Kandundu, Mboanjikana of Libonda (reigned 1996–2023)
- Nolianga, Mboanjikana of Libonda (reigned 2025–present)

== Zamindars ==
=== Bangladesh ===
- Rani Bhabani, zamindar of Rajshahi Raj family
- Saratsundari Devi, zamindar of Puthia Raj family
- Hemanta Kumari Devi, zamindar of Puthia Raj family

=== India ===
- Rani Bhawani, zamindar of Midnapore Raj
- Rani Shiromani, zamindar of Midnapore Raj
- Rani Rashmoni, zamindar of Janbazar
- Mangaleswari Nachiyar, zamindar of Ramnad estate
- Rani Muthu Virai Nachiyar, zamindar of Ramnad estate
- Parvatha Vardhani Ammal Nachchiyar, zamindar of Ramnad estate
- Kathama Nachiar, zamindar of Sivaganga estate
- Anna Purna, zamindar of Pal Lahara State
- Chellamma, zamindar of Avuku
- Rani Dhwaja Moni Devi, zamindar of Bishnupur (reigned 1885–1889)
