= List of rulers of Odisha =

The land of Odisha or former Kalinga has undergone several changes in terms of its boundaries since ancient ages. It was also known by different names like Odra Desha, Kalinga, Hirakhanda, Mahakantara or Utkala in different eras. Unlike other ancient kingdoms in India, Odisha for most part of the History remained a stable and major power till medieval era due to widespread martial culture and prosperity brought by successive native ruling dynasties.

The year 1568 is considered a turning point in the history of Odisha. In 1568, Kalapahad invaded the state. This, aided by internal conflicts, led to a steady downfall of the state from which it did not recover.

== Ancient period ==
=== Kalinga kingdom (c. 1100–261 BCE) ===
According to political scientist Sudama Misra, the Kalinga janapada originally comprised the area covered by the Puri and Ganjam districts.

==== Kalinga dynasty (I) (c. 1100–700 BCE) ====
According to Mahabharata and some Puranas, the prince 'Kalinga' founded the Kalinga kingdom, in the current day region of coastal Odisha, including the North Sircars.

The Mahabharata also mentions one 'Srutayudha' as the king of the Kalinga kingdom, who joined the Kaurava camp. In the Buddhist text, Mahagovinda Suttanta, Kalinga and its ruler, 'Sattabhu', have been mentioned.

Known rulers are-

- King Kalinga, (founder of Kalinga kingdom)
- King Odra, (founder of Odra kingdom)
- Srutayudha
- Srutayush
- Manimat
- Chitrangada
- Subahu
- Virasena
- Sudatta
- Nalikira
- Yavanaraj
- Dantavakkha or Dantavakhra (c. 9th century BCE)
- Avakinnayo Karakandu (c. late 9th to early 8th century BCE)
- Vasupala (c. 8th century BCE)

==== Kalinga dynasty (II) (c. 700–350 BCE) ====
This dynasty is mentioned in Chullakalinga Jataka and Kalingabodhi Jataka. The last ruler of the first Kalinga dynasty is said to have broken away from the Danda kingdom along with the kings of Asmaka and Vidarbha as its feudal states, and established rule of second Kalinga dynasty.

Known rulers are

- Dandaki
- Mahakalinga
- Chullakalinga
- Kalinga II (c. 7th – 6th century BCE)

Other or late Kalinga rulers according to Dāṭhavaṃsa are

This was probably another dynasty or late rulers of Second Kalinga dynasty, which is mentioned in Dāṭhavaṃsa.

Known rulers are

- Brahmadatta (c. 6th – 5th century BCE)
- Sattabhu
- Kasiraja
- Sunanda
- Guhasiva

==== Suryavamsha of Kalinga (c. 350–261 BCE) ====
Known rulers are-

- Brahmaadittiya (c. 4th century BCE)

His son, prince 'Soorudasaruna-Adeettiya' (sudarshanāditya) was exiled and as per Maldivian history, established the first kingdom the Kingdom of Dheeva Maari and laid the foundation of the Adeetta dynasty.

- Unknown rulers
- Unknown (till 261 BCE), ruler of Kalinga at time of Mauryan annexation of Kalinga.

After Kalinga War (261 BCE), Kalinga kingdom became a part of Mauryan Empire, after which Kalinga kingdom was succeeded by Mahameghavahana Empire between 230–190 BCE which ruled till 350 CE.

=== Kalinga under Magadha Empire (c. 345–225 BCE) ===
==== Under Nanda Empire (c. 345–322 BCE) ====
Kalinga was believed to be briefly annexed by Mahapadma Nanda.

- Mahapadma Nanda (380–340 BCE)
- Pandhuka
- Panghupati
- Bhutapala
- Rashtrapala
- Govishanaka
- Dashasidkhaka
- Kaivarta
- Mahendra
- Dhana Nanda (322–321 BCE)

When Chandragupta Maurya rebelled against the Nandas, Kalingas broke away from the empire of Magadha.

==== Under Maurya Empire (c. 261–225 BCE) ====
Ashoka invaded Kalinga in 261 BCE. Kalinga broke away from the Mauryan empire during the rule of Dasharatha.

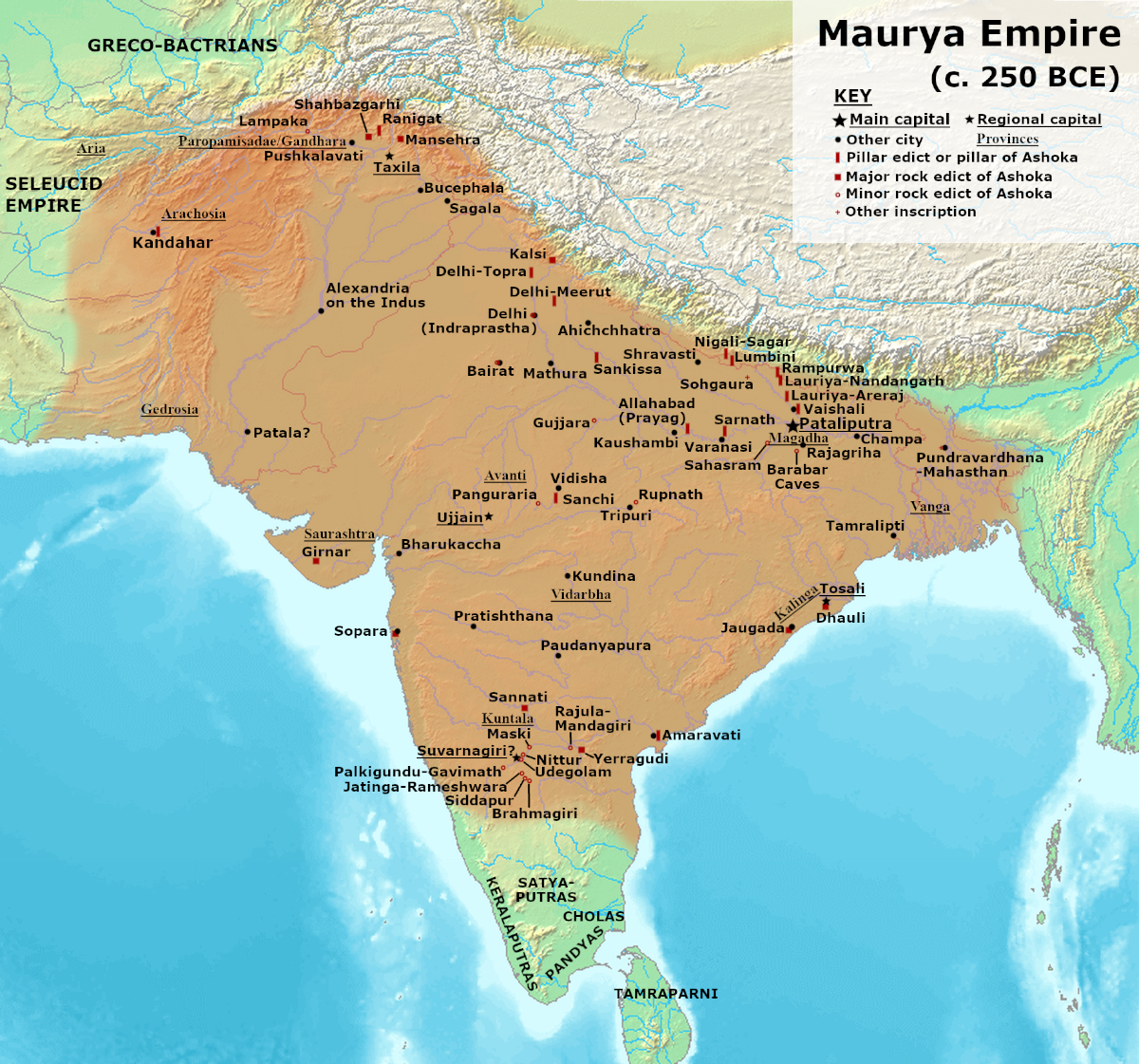
Maurya Empire at Ashoka's regin in 250 BCE

- Ashoka (274–232 BCE)
- Dasharatha Maurya (232–224 BCE)

=== Mahameghavahana Empire (c. 225 BCE – 350 CE) ===
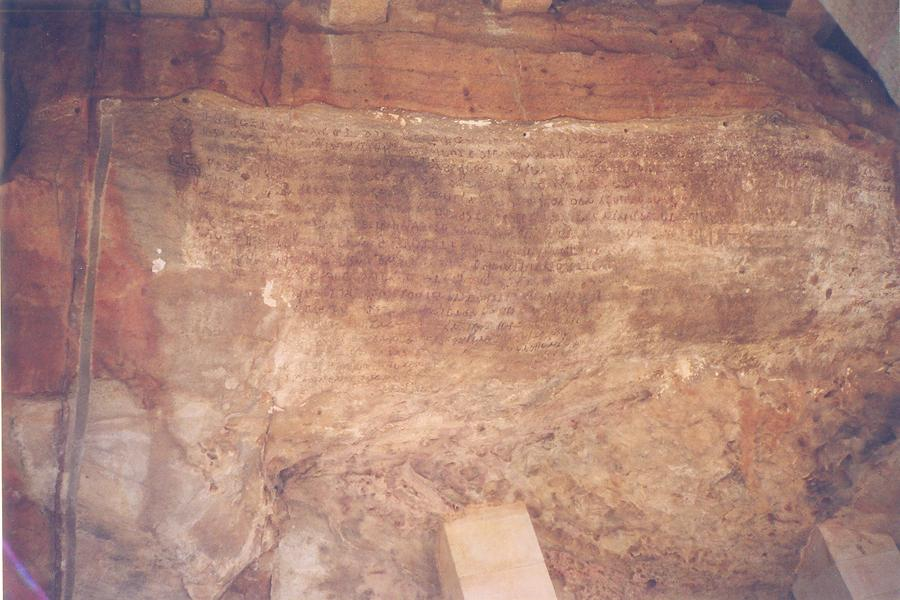
Hātigumfā inscription of Emperor Kharavela at Udayagiri Hills.

Mahamegha Vahana was the founder of the Kalingan Chedi or Cheti dynasty. The names of Sobhanaraja, Chandraja, Ksemaraja also appear in context. But, Kharavela is the most well known among them. The exact relation between Mahamegha Vahana and Kharavela is not known.

- Vasu
- Mahamegha Vahana
- Sobhanaraja
- Chandraja
- Ksemaraja
- Vakradeva (or) Virdhharaja
- Kharavela (c. 193 BCE–155 BCE)
- Kudepasiri Vakradeva ll
- Vaduka
- Galaveya

It is not known that, if Vakadeva was a successor or predecessor of Kharavela. From the inscriptions and coins discovered at Guntupalli and Velpuru, Andhra Pradesh, we know of a series of rulers with the suffix Sada who were possibly distant successors of Kharavela.

- Mana-Sada
- Siri-Sada
- Maha-Sada
- Sivamaka-Sada
- Asaka-Sada

=== Murunda dynasty (150–250 CE) ===
- Gana (c. 2nd cen CE)
- Dhamadamadhara (Dharmatamadharasya) (c. 3rd century CE)

=== Satavahana Empire (ca. 60–199 CE) ===
Gautamiputra Satakarni is known to have invaded Kalinga during his reign. The Nashik prashasti inscription of Gautamiputra's mother during the reign of Vasisthiputra Pulumavi, located in the Nasik Caves, states that his orders were obeyed by the circle of all kings and calls him the lord of mount Mahendra among a list of other mountains.

- Gautamiputra Sri Satakarni (c. 60–84 CE)
- Vasisthiputra Sri Pulumavi (c. 84–119 CE)
- Vasisthiputra Sri Satakarni (c. 119–148 CE)
- Vasisthiputra Sivasri Pulumavi (c. 148–156 CE)
- Vasisthiputra Sriskanda Satakarni (c. 156–170 CE)
- Gautamiputra Sriyajña Satakarni (c. 171–199 CE)

== Pre-classical period ==
=== Naga dynasty of Vindhyatabi (225–360) ===
An inscription dating from 3rd to 4th century found in Asanpat village in Keonjhar revealed the existence of this dynasty.

- Manabhanja (225–261)
- Satrubhanja (261–340)
- Disabhanja (340–360)

=== Parvatadvarka dynasty (360–400) ===
During the same period as the Nalas, the region around modern-day Kalahandi was ruled by them. Not much is known about them.

- Sobhanaraja
- Tustikara

=== Kings mentioned in Raghuvamsha of Kalidasa ===
- Hemangada

=== Gupta Empire (335–550) ===
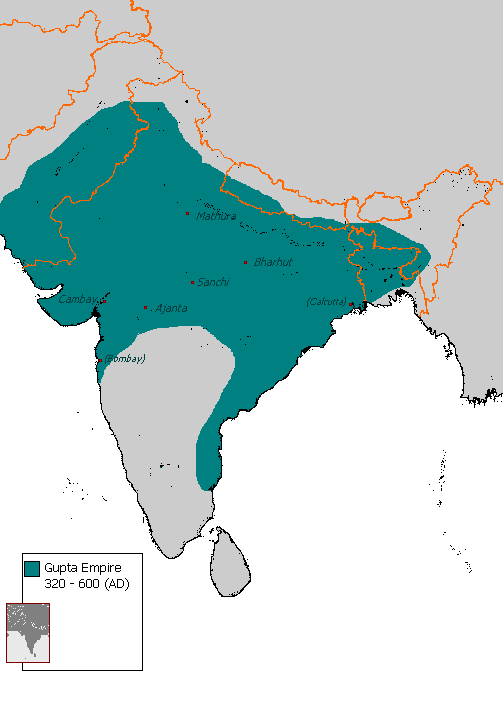
Gupta Empire 320–600 CE

Samudragupta invaded Kalinga during his reign in c.350. By c.571, most of Kalinga had broken away from the Gupta empire.

- Samudragupta (335–380 CE)
- Ramagupta (380)
- Chandragupta II (380–415 CE)
- Kumaragupta I (415–455 CE)
- Skandagupta (455–467 CE)
- Purugupta (467–473 CE)
- Kumaragupta II (473–476)
- Budhagupta (476–495)
- Kumaragupta III (495–500)
- Vishnugupta (500–520)
- Vainyagupta (520–540)
- Bhanugupta (540–550 CE)

=== Nala dynasty (400–740) ===
Nalas and Kalinga, with their other contemporaries, c. 375 CE

For some time in 4th century, the southern Odisha region around modern-day Koraput, Rayagada, Malkangiri and undivided Bastar, was ruled by the Nalas.

- Vrishadhvaja (400–420 CE)
- Varaharaja (420–440 CE)
- Bhavadattavarman or Bhavadattaraja (441–446 CE)
- Arthapatiraja (446–478)
- Skandavarman (480–515 CE)
- Stambha (515–550 CE)
- Sri-Nandanaraja (550–585 CE)
- Prithviraja (585–625 CE)
- Viruparaja (625–660 CE)
- Vilasatunga (660–700 CE)
- Prthivivyaghra (700–740 CE)

=== Rajarsitulyakula (4th–6th century CE) ===
The later half of the 4th century, this dynasty was established in the South Kosala region.

- Maharaja Sura
- Maharaja Dayita I (or Dayitavarman I)
- Maharaja Bhimasena I
- Maharaja Dayitavarman II
- Maharaja Bhimasena II (c. 501 or 601–?)

=== Sharabhapuriya dynasty (475–590) ===
Not much is known about this dynasty. Everything known about them, comes from the inscriptions on copper plates and coins. They may or may not have also been known as the Amararyakula dynasty. This dynasty is supposed to have started by one Sarabha, who may have been a feudal chief under the Guptas. They ruled over the modern-day region of Raipur, Bilaspur and Kalahandi.

- Sharabha (Śarabha), c. 475–500 CE
- Narendra, c. 500–525 CE
- Prasanna, c. 525–550 CE
- Jayarāja, c. 550–560 CE
- Sudevarāja, c 560–570 CE
- Manamatra alias Durgarāja, c. 570–580 CE
- Sudevarāja, c. 570–580 CE
- Pravarāja, c. 580–590 CE

=== Mathara dynasty (4th–5th century CE) ===
The Mathara dynasty ruled during the 4th and the 5th centuries. The Mathara rulers include:

- Shakti-varman (Śaktivarman)
- Prabhanjana-varman (Prabhañjanavarman)
- Ananta-shakti-varman (Anantaśaktivarman)

=== Vishnukundina dynasty (420–555) ===
Anantasaktivarman lost southern part of his kingdom to Madhava Varma II and the Matharas never recovered it.

- Madhava Varma I (420–455 CE)
- Indra Varma (455–461)
- Madhava Verma II (461–508 CE)
- Vikramendra Varma I (508–528)
- Indra Bhattaraka Varma (528–555 CE)

Indra Bhattaraka Varma possibly lost his Kalinga holdings to one Adiraja Indra, who possibly was Indravarma I of East Ganga Dynasty.

=== Vigraha dynasty (575–630) ===
They ruled the region called South Toshali or Kalinga-rashtra, around modern-day Puri and Ganjam, during second half of 6th century.

- Prithivi Vigraha (575–600 CE)
- Loka Vigraha (c. 600–630 CE)

=== Mudgalas dynasty (580 CE–?) ===
They ruled the region of North Toshali, the river Mahanadi served as the border between North and South Toshali. Around 599-600 CE, they invaded South Toshali and by 604 CE the Vigrahas claim to suzerainty over Toshali ended.

- Sambhuyasa (c. 580 CE–?)

Copper plate grants have been found of a feudatory of Sambhuyasa named Bhanudatta in Olasingh Village, Khordha and Balasore. The absence of the name of his overlord in his grants during his 5th regnal year may indicate that Sambhuyasa died without an heir and his kingdom maybe in a state of chaos. Bhanudatta might have enjoyed a short independent rule in the region around Soro, Balasore. Somadatta, presumably of the same family as Bhanudatta from the Balasore region, issued a grant from the visaya of Sarephahara (now identified with the region around Soro, Balasore) which was included in the Odra-visaya or Ordra-desa. Odra-visaya is taken to be another name for the entire Toshali kingdom under Sambhuyasa.

=== Durjaya dynasty (620–680) ===
In mid-6th century CE, a chief, Ranadurjaya, established himself in South Kalinga. Prithivimaharaja probably consolidated his kingdom by conquering parts of the Toshali kingdom.

- Ranadurjaya
- Prithivimaharaja

== Post-classical period ==
=== Gauda Kingdom ===
Shashanka invaded and possibly occupied North Toshali (or Utkala including modern day Mayurbhanj, Balasore, Cuttack, Keonjhar and Dhenkanal) and South Toshali (or Kalinga including Cuttack, Puri and Ganjam) from the Mudgalas. A copper plate grant from Somadatta's 19th regnal year calls him the ruler of Utkala and Dandabhukti(Dantan in South-Western Midnapore) and he assumes the subordinate royal title of samanta-maharaja under Shashanka.

Shashanka seemed to have established another fief called Kongoda under a new ruling family called Shailodbhava. The Ganjam grant of Madhavaraja II was issued on the occasion of solar eclipse. Lorenz Franz Kielhorn worked out the two nearest possible dates which could have corroborated with the Gupta year mentioned in this record, the two solar eclipses that could have been visible from Ganjam district being on 4 November 617 CE and 2 September 620 CE. Evidently the possible date of the grant is the latter one. Immediately after 620 CE, Madhavaraja II might have assumed independence from Shashanka. After this Shashanka was no more in the political arena of Odisha when Madhavaraja II issued his Khordha grant which describes him as "lord of the whole of Kalinga".

- Shashanka (c. ?–620 CE)

=== Shailodbhava dynasty ===
They ruled from the region ranging from coastal Odisha to Mahanadi and to Mahendragiri in Paralakhemundi. This region was called the Kongoda mandala. Sailobhava, the founder of dynasty, is said to have been born of a rock, hence the name Shailodbhava. Sailobhava was the adopted son of one Pulindasena, who was possibly a chieftain. They were possibly the subordinates of Shashanka until Madhavaraja II.

- Pulindasena (?)
- Sailobhava (?)
- Dharmaraja I (or Ranabhita)
- Madhavaraja I (or Sainyabita I)
- Ayasobhita I (or Chharamparaja)
- Madhavaraja II (or Madhavavarman) (? – 665 CE)
- Madhyamaraja I (or Ayasobhita II) (665 CE – ?)
- Dharmaraja II

As the feudatory of Shashanka, Madhavaraja I had the title of Maharaja Mahasamanta. In the second copper plate chatter issued by Madhavaraja II from Kongoda, he is endowed with the title of Sakala-Kalingadhipati(Lord of the whole of Kalinga). Based on Chinese traveler Xuanzang's account it is believed that the Pushyabhuti emperor Harshavardhana may have invaded Utkala and Kongoda. But his victories if any may have been formal as Madhavaraja II did not refer to any overlordship in his grants after gaining independence from Shashanka.

=== Bhaumakara dynasty ===
The Bhauma or Bhauma-Kara Dynasty lasted from c. 736 CE to c. 940 CE. They mostly controlled the coastal areas of Kalinga. But by c.850 CE, they controlled most of modern Odisha. The later part of their reign was disturbed by rebellions from the Bhanja dynasty of the Sonepur and Boudh region.

- Lakshmikaradeva (?)
- Ksemankaradeva (736)
- Sivakaradeva I (or Unmattasimha) (c. 756/786 –?)
- Subhakaradeva I (c. 790 –?)
- Sivakaradeva II (c. 809 –?)
- Santikaradeva I (or Gayada I) (?)
- Subhakaradeva II (c. 836 –?)
- Subhakaradeva III (?–845)
- Tribhuvana Mahadevi I (widow of Santikaradeva I) (c. 845 –?)
- Santikaradeva II (?)
- Subhakaradeva IV (or Kusumahara II) (c. 881 –?)
- Sivakaradeva III (or Lalitahara) (c. 885 –?)
- Tribhuvana Mahadevi II (or Prithivi Mahadevi, widow of Subhakara IV) (c. 894 –?)
- Tribhuvana Mahadevi III (widow of Sivakara III) ?
- Santikaradeva III (?)
- Subhakara V (?)
- Gauri Mahadevi (wife of Subhakara) (?)
- Dandi Mahadevi (daughter of Gauri) (c. 916 or 923 – ?)
- Vakula Mahadevi (stepmother of Dandi Mahadevi) (?)
- Dharma Mahadevi (widow of Santikaradeva) (?)

=== The mandala states ===
Between the 8th and 11th centuries, Odisha was divided into mandalas which were feudal states ruled by chieftains. These chieftains swore allegiance to the Bhaumakaras. This period saw the rise of the Bhanja dynasty.

==== Bhanjas of Khinjali mandala ====
===== Early Bhanjas of Khinjali mandala =====
- Silabhanja I (8th cen CE)
- Satrubhanja (8th cen CE)
- Ranabhanja (9th cen CE)
- Netribhanja I (Nettabhanja I)
- Digbhanja
- Silabhanja II
- Vidyadharbhanja
- Nettabhanja II

===== Baudh Bhanjas of Khinjali mandala =====
- Solanabhanja
- Durjayabhanja
- Kanakabhanja

===== Later Bhanjas of Khinjali mandala =====
- Devabhaja
- Rayabhanja I
- Virabhanja
- Rayabhanja II
- Yasobhanja (12th cen CE)
- Jayabhanja (12th cen CE)
- Virabhanja II

==== Bhanjas of Khijjinga mandala ====
- Virabhadra Adi-Bhanja (8th cen CE)
- Kottabhanja
- Digbhanja
- Rajabanja
- Ranabhanja (924 CE Bamanghaty inscription)
- Narendrabhanja

==== Sulkis of Kodalaka Mandala ====
Kodalaka refers to the modern-day district of Dhenkanal.

- Kanchanastambha who was succeeded by his son Kalahastambha.
- Ranastambha (c.839-?)
- Jayasthambha
- Kulastambha II

Later, the mandala was divided into two parts, Yamagartta Mandala and Airavatta Mandala. The Bhaumas allowed the Tunga and the Nandodbhava families to rule over Yamagartta Mandala and Airavatta Mandala respectively.

==== Tungas of Yamagartta Mandala ====
The Mandala refers to the northern part of modern Dhenkanal district. Jayasimha was ruler of the mandala before the Tungas, he was not a member of the Tunga dynasty.

- Jayasimha (c. 864 )
- Khadaga Tunga
- Vinita Tunga
- Solana Tunga
- Gayada Tunga
- Apsara Deva.

It is not clearly known if Apsara Deva belonged to the Tunga family or not.

==== Nandodbhavas of Airavatta Mandala ====
This region extended over the territory comprising southern part of Dhenkanal district, some western portion of Cuttack district and almost the entire Nayagarh district.

- Jayananda
- Paramananda
- Sivananda
- Devananda I
- Devananda II (c. 920–?)
- Dhruvananda (c. 929–?)

==== Mayuras of Banei Mandala ====
This region roughly comprised the modern-day Banei sub-division and parts of Panposh subdivision of Sundergarh district.

- Udita Varsha
- Teja Varsha
- Udaya Varsha

==== Gangas of Svetaka Mandala ====
The capital of Svetaka known as Svetakapura has been identified with modern Chikiti.

- Jayavarma Deva
- Anantavarman
- Gangaka Vilasa
- Bhupendra Varman
- Mahendravarman
- Prithivarman
- Indravarman I
- Indravarman II
- Samantavarman (c. 909–921?)

=== Somvanshi (Keshari) dynasty ===
The Soma or Kesari Dynasty originates in South Kosala, but by the reign of Yayati I, they controlled most of modern Orissa.

- Janmejaya I (c. 882–992)
- Yayati I (c. 922–955)
- Bhimaratha (c. 955–80)
- Dharmarstha (c. 980–1005)
- Nahusa (c. 1005–1021)
- Indranatha (c. 1021–1025)
- Yayati II (c. 1025–1040)
- Udyotakesari (c. 1040–1065)
- Janmejaya II (c. 1065–1080)
- Puranjaya (c. 1080–1090)
- Karnadeva (c. 1090–1110)

Janmejaya, the predecessor of Karnadeva and the son of Janmejaya II, was not considered a ruler by his successors, as he captured the throne in a violent coup and soon-after lost it.

=== Chindaka Naga dynasty ===
The Chindaka Nagas are believed by certain historians to have arrived in the Chakrakota Mandala region (Bastar and Koraput) with the expedition of Rajendra Chola. The Telugu Chodas who invaded the region later, settled as their feudal rulers. This dynasty continued to rule the region till the thirteenth century with not many details known about their rulers excepting a few.

- Nrupati Bhushana (1023– ?)
- Jagadeka Bhushana or Dharavarsha
- Madhurantaka
- Somesvara
- Kanhara

=== Eastern Ganga dynasty ===
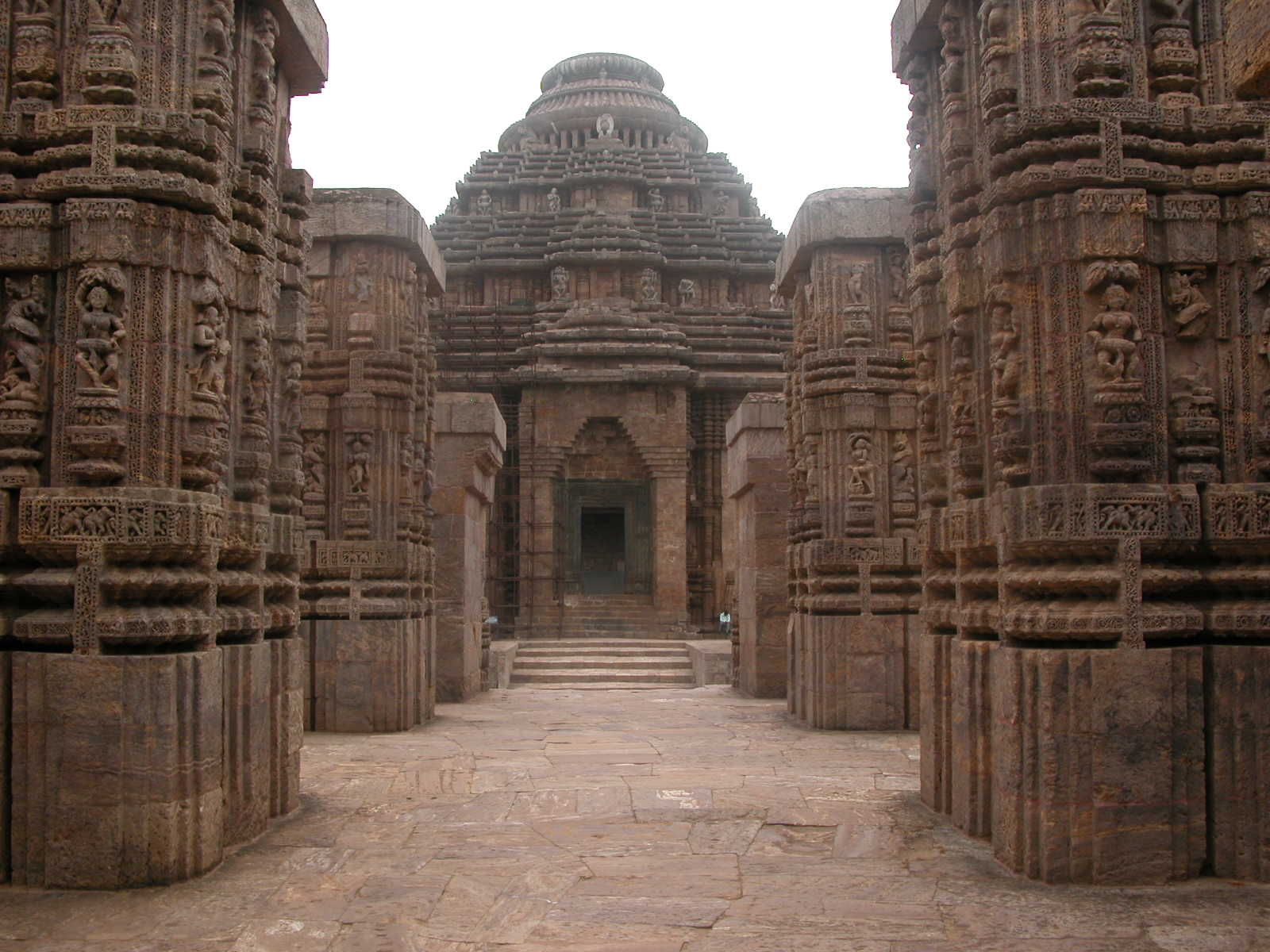
Narasimhadeva I built the Konark temple

Indravarman I is earliest known independent king of the dynasty. He is known from the Jirjingi copper plate grant.

- Mittavarman, a feudal Eastern Ganga king under Vakataka rule (c. ?–?)
- Indravarman I (c. ?–537?)
- Samantavarman (c. 537–562)
- Hastivarman (c. 562–578)
- Indravarman II (c. 578–589)
- Danarnava (c. 589–652)
- Indravarman III (c. 589–652)
- Gunarnava (c. 652–682)
- Devendravarman I (c. 652–682?)
- Anantavarman III (c. 808–812?)
- Rajendravarman II (c. 812–840?)
- Devendravarman V (c. 885–895?)
- Gunamaharnava I (c. 895–939?)
- Vajrahasta II (or Anangabhimadeva I) (c. 895–939?)
- Gundama – (c. 939–942)
- Kamarnava I (c. 942–977)
- Vinayaditya (c. 977–980)
- Vajrahasta IV (c. 980–1015)
- Kamarnava II (c. 1015 – 6 months after)
- Gundama II (c. 1015–1038)
- Vajrahasta V (c. 1038–1070)
- Rajaraja Deva I (c. 1070–1077)
- Anantavarman Chodaganga (c. 1077–1147)
- Jatesvaradeva (c. 1147–1156)
- Raghava Deva (c. 1156–1170)
- Rajaraja Deva II (c. 1170–1190)
- Anangabhima Deva II (c. 1190–1198)
- Rajraja Deva III (c. 1198–1211)
- Anangabhima Deva III (c. 1211–1238)
- Narasimha Deva I (1238–1264)
- Bhanu Deva I (1264–1278)
- Narasimha Deva II (1279–1306)
- Bhanu Deva II (1306–1328)
- Narasimha Deva III (1328–1352)
- Bhanu Deva III (1352–1378)
- Narasimha Deva IV (1378–1414)
- Bhanu Deva IV (1414–1434)

==== Gudari Kataka Eastern Ganga rulers ====
According to Gangavansucharitam written in sixteenth or seventeenth century, Bhanu Deva IV also known as Kajjala Bhanu founded a new small princedom in southern Odisha at Gudari in modern Rayagada district after he was toppled from power by his general Kapilendra Deva.

- Kajjala Bhanu or Bhanu Deva IV
- Svarna Bhanu
- Kalasandha Deva
- Chudanga Deva
- Harimani Deva
- Narasimha Deva
- Ananta Deva
- Padmanabha Deva
- Pitambara Deva
- Vasudeva
- Purrushottama Anangabhima Deva or Bhima Deva

==== Parlakhemundi Ganga rulers ====
Parlakhemundi state rulers were the direct descendants of the Eastern Ganga dynasty rulers of Odisha.

- Narasingha Deba (1309–1320)
- Madanrudra Deba (1320–1339)
- Narayana Rudra Deba (1339–1353)
- Ananda Rudra Deba (1353–1354)
- Ananda Rudra Deba (1354–1367)
- Jayarudra Deba (1367–1399)
- Lakhsmi Narasingha Deba (1399–1418)
- Madhukarna Gajapati (1418–1441)
- Murtunjaya Bhanu Deba (1441–1467)
- Madhaba Bhanu Deba (1467–1495)
- Chandra Betal Bhanu Deba (1495–1520)
- Subarnalinga Bhanu Deba (1520–1550)
- Sibalinga Narayan Bhanudeo (1550–1568)
- Subarna Kesari Govinda Gajapati Narayan Deo (1568–1599)
- Mukunda Rudra Gajapati Narayan Deo (1599–1619)
- Mukunda Deo (1619–1638)
- Ananta Padmanabh Gajapati Narayan Deo I (1638–1648)
- Sarbajgan Jagannatha Gajapati Narayan Deo I (1648–1664)
- Narahari Narayan Deo (1664–1691)
- Bira Padmanabh Narayan Deo II (1691–1706)
- Prataprudra Gajapati Narayan Deo I (1706–1736)
- Jagannatha Gajapati Narayana Deo II (1736–1771)
- Goura Chandra Gajapati Narayan Deo I (1771–1803)
- Purushottam Gajapati Narayan Deo (1803–1806)
- Jagannath Gajapati Narayan Deo III (1806–1850)
- Prataprudra Gajapati Narayan Deo II (1850–1885)
- Goura Chandra Gajapati Narayan Deo II (1885–1904)
- Krushna Chandra Gajapati Narayan Deo (1913 – 25 May 1974)
- Gopinath Gajapati Narayan Deo (25 May 1974 – 10 January 2020)
- Kalyani Gajapati (10 January 2020–present)

==== Chikiti Ganga rulers ====
Historians conclude that the rulers of Chikiti were from the line of Ganga ruler Hastivarman.

- Kesaba Rautara (Bira Karddama Singha Rautara) (881–940)
- Balabhadra Rautara (941–997)
- Madhaba Rautara (998–1059)
- Languli Rautara (1060–1094)
- Mohana Rautara (1095–1143)
- Balarama Rautara (1144–1197)
- Biswanatha Rautara (1198–1249)
- Harisarana Rautara (1250–1272)
- Raghunatha Rautara (1273–1313)
- Dinabandhu Rautara (1314–1364)
- Gopinatha Rautara (1365–1417)
- Ramachandra Rautara (1418–1464)
- Narayana Rautara (1465–1530)
- Narasingha Rautara (1531–1583)
- Lokanatha Rautara (1584–1633)
- Jadumani Rautara (1634–1691)
- Madhusudana Rajendra Deba (1692–1736)
- Kulamani Rajendra Deba (1737–1769)
- Krusnachandra Rajendra Deba (1770–1790)
- Pitambara Rajendra Deba (1791–1819)
- Gobindachandra Rajendra Deba (1820–1831)
- Kulamani Rajendra Deba (1832–1835)
- Brundabanachandra Rajendra Deba (1835–1846)
- Jagannatha Rajendra Deba (1847–1855)
- Biswambhara Rajendra Deba (1856–1885)
- Kisorachandra Rajendra Deba (1885–1903)
- Radhamohana Rajendra Deba (1903–1923) and (1934–1937)
- Gaurachandra Rajendra Deba (1923–1934)
- Court of Wards (1937–1945)
- Sachhidananda Rajendra Deba (1945–1947)

==== Gadapur Ganga Estate ====
History of the Gadapur Royal Family Historians conclude that the Ganga rulers of Gadapur were from the line of Sanakhemundi Ganga Family, and close relation with chikiti Royal family, The Gadapur Zamindari family traces its origin to the royal lineage of Sanakhemundi Rajya. During the reign of Aadhi Kandha Deba, his two sons were set to inherit the throne, which created tensions and the possibility of conflict. To prevent a war, the nearby branches of the family — Parlakhemundi and Badakhemundi — intervened and settled lands for the two sons, who were cousins of these lines. Consequently, the Sanakhemundi State was divided: the elder son retained the native Sanakhemundi region, while the younger son, Thata-Raja Raghunath Deba, established his estate in the hilly regions of Kandhamal, founding the Gadapur Zamindari.

Under British rule, this estate became known as the 14 Koss Zamindari, extending from Surada Rajya to Tumerbinda Patra Rajya, and emerged as one of the major estates in the Kandhamal region. The Gadapur rulers were renowned as Maladhipatis (Lords of the Tribals), exercising significant influence and responsibility over tribal communities. Remarkably, the Zamindari system in Gadapur continued until 1995, surviving even after the official abolition of Zamindari in 1951, reflecting the enduring legacy and respect commanded by the family.

- Thatraj Saheb Raghunath Deba (1840-1899)
- Thatraj Saheb Surjya Narayan Deba (1899-1917)
- Thatraj Saheb Kishore-Chandra Deba (1917-1928)
- Thatraj Saheb Brindaban Deba (younger son of Surjya Narayan Deba) (1928-1940)
- Thatraj Saheb Rajiblochan Deo (Elder & Successor son of Kishore Chandra) (1940-2003)
- Thatraj Saheb Nalinikantha Deo (Titular King) (2003-2020)
- Thatraj Saheb Khirod Chandra Deo, (Titular & Current Rajha from 2020)

=== Naga dynasty of Kalahandi ===
- Raghunath Sai (1005–1040 AD)
- Pratap Narayan Deo (1040–1072 AD)
- Birabar Deo (1072–1108 AD)
- Jugasai Deo I (1108–1142 AD)
- Udenarayan Deo (1142–1173 AD)
- Harichandra Deo (1173–1201 AD)
- Ramachandra Deo (1201–1234 AD)
- Gopinath Deo (1234–1271 AD)
- Balabhadra Deo (1271–1306 AD)
- Raghuraj Deo (1306–1337 AD)
- Rai Singh Deo I (1337–1366 AD)
- Haria Deo (1366–1400 AD)
- Jugasai Deo II (1400–1436 AD)
- Pratap Narayan Deo II (1436–1468 AD)
- Hari Rudra Deo (1468–1496 AD)
- Anku Deo (1496–1528 AD)
- Pratap Deo (1528–1564 AD)
- Raghunath Deo (1564–1594 AD)
- Biswambhar Deo (1594–1627 AD)
- Rai Singh Deo II (1627–1658 AD)
- Dusmant Deo (1658–1693 AD)
- Jugasai Deo III (1693–1721 AD)
- Khadag Rai Deo (1721–1747 AD)
- Rai Singh Deo III (1747–1771 AD)
- Purusottam Deo (1771–1796 AD)
- Jugasai Dei IV (1796–1831 AD)
- Fate Narayan Deo (1831–1853 AD)
- Udit Pratap Deo I (1853–1881 AD)
- Raghu Keshari De (1894–1897 AD)
- Court of Wards (1897–1917 AD)
- Brajamohan Deo (1917–1939 AD)
- Pratap Keshari Deo (1939–1947 AD until the merger with Orissa state)

=== Silavamsa rulers of Nandapur ===
The Machkund or Matsyakund River (also called Sileru River in Andhra Pradesh) formed the border between the Silavamsa dynasty of Nandpur and the Matsya dynasty of Odda-Adi in Madugula. The Silavamsa and Matsya family were connected by matrimonial alliances and the Vaddadi kingdom of Matsya family was eventually destroyed by Krishna Deva Raya and absorbed into the Nandapur Kingdom.

- Ganga Raja (1353–??)
- Viswanadha Raja or Bhairava Raja
- Pratap Ganga Raja (??–1443)

The Silavamsa king Pratap Ganga Raja died without any male heir, only leaving behind his wife and daughter Lilavati. Lilavati married Vinayak Dev, the ruler of Gudari and he became the ruler of Nandapur after Pratap Ganga Raja's death. Vishwanath Dev Gajapati transferred his capital to Rayagada. During his reign Shri Chaitanya migrated southward and they adopted the title of "Nauna Gajapati". In 1540 CE, after the death of Prataparudra Deva he declared himself Gajapati, but later accepted the suzerainty of Govinda Vidyadhara. He consolidated his kingdom but by 1550 lost the regions between Krishna and Godavari to Qutb Shahi dynasty. After his death in 1571, Ibrahim Qutb Shah invaded the kingdom and incorporated their territories into Golconda Sultanate.

- Vinayak Dev (1443–1476)
- Vijay Chandra or Vijaychandraksha Dev(1476–1510)
- Bhairav Dev (1510–1527)
- Vishwanath Dev Gajapati (1527–1571)

=== Early Chauhan rulers ===
This Rajput dynasty had arrived from Mainpuri or Garh Sambhor amidst a conflict with the Muslim rulers of Delhi around 13th or 14th century. The founder Ramai Deva was still in the womb of his mother when his father was murdered by the Yavanas and she fled to the hilly and forest terrains of western Odisha to seek refuge. The early 17th-century works by the Poet Gangadhar Mishra (a descendant of the famous Sanskrit poet Sambhukara from Puri) known as Kosalananda and early 18th-century work by the Chauhan king Vaijala Deva known as Probodha Chandrika and Jayachandrika give detailed descriptions about their origins and foundation of the state first at Patna and then Sambalpur.

Ramai Deva was first adopted by a local priest or Brahmin chief known as Chakradhara Panigrahi who provided shelter and refuge to his fleeing mother during her pregnancy. Ramai Deva later won over other local chiefs and established the Patna state. He married the daughter of the Eastern Ganga King Bhanudeva III

==== Patna (Bolangir) ====
- Ramai Deva (1360–1380)
- Mahalinga Deva (1380–1385)
- Vatsaraja Deva (1385–1410)
- Vaijala Deva I (1410–1430)
- Bhojaraj Deva (1430–1455)
- Pratap Rudra Deva I (1455–1480)
- Bhupal Deva I (1480–1500)
- Vikramaditya Deva I (1500–1520)
- Vaijal Deva II (1520–1540)
- Bajra Hiradhara Deva (1540–1570)
- Narsingh Deva (1570–1577)
- Hamir Deva (1577–1581)
- Pratap Deva II (1581–1620)
- Vikramaditya Deva II (1620–1640)
- Mukunda Deva (1640–1670)
- Balaram Deva (1670–1678)
- Hrdesha Deva (1678–1685)
- Rai Singh Deva (1685–1762)
- Prithviraj Deva (1762–1765)
- Ramchandra Singh Deo I (1765–1820)
- Bhupal Singh Deo (1820–1848)
- Hiravajra Singh Deo (1848–1866)
- Pratap Singh Deo (1866–1878)
- Ramchandra Singh Deo II (1878–1895)
- Lal Dalganjan Singh Deo (1895–1910)
- Prithviraj Singh (1910–1924)
- Rajendra Narayan Singh Deo (1924–1948)

==== Sambalpur ====
- Balarama Deva (1570 – 1595 CE)
- Hrdayanarayana Deva (1595–1605)
- Balabhadra Deva (1605–1630)
- Madhukar Deva (1630–1660)
- Baliara Deva (1650–1688)
- Ratan Singh (1688–1690)
- Chhatra Sai (1690–1725)
- Ajit Singh (1725–1766)
- Abhaya Singh (1766–1778)
- Balabhadra Singh (1778–1781)
- Jayanta Singh (1781–1818)
- Maharaj Sai (1820–1827)
- Rani Mohan Kumari (f) (1827–1833)
- Narayan Singh (1833–1849)
- Surendra Sai (in rebellion) (1857–1862)

=== Bahubalendra Chalukya ===
The Bahubalendra Chalukya dynasty, traces its ancestry to the Eastern Chalukyas of Rajahmundry, a powerful dynasty that ruled parts of South India between the 7th and 12th centuries. The dynasty’s spiritual and dynastic lineage is linked to divine origins—stemming from the sage Atri and Pururavas, leading to the Pandavas of the Mahabharata, particularly Arjuna, and continuing through his son Abhimanyu and descendant Vishnuvardhana, the progenitor of the Eastern Chalukyas. From this illustrious line, Vijayaditya, son of Kulottunga I and Chandambika Devi, founded the independent Chalukya kingdom of Elamanchili around 1175 CE. Over time, his descendants, known as the Chalukyas of Elamanchili, ruled parts of modern-day Andhra and Odisha, particularly in the Vizagapatam and Godavari districts. Despite recognizing the suzerainty of the Eastern Gangas, they remained mostly independent and were known for military resilience and cultural patronage. As time passed, a northern branch of the Elamanchili Chalukyas migrated and established themselves in Machamara village (now in Odisha), giving rise to the Bahubalendra Chalukyas of Machamara. Their royal insignia—a wild boar holding a sword, flanked by the sun and half-moon—symbolized their divine protection, strength, and enduring sovereignty.

Rulers

- Rajha Sarvaloksrya Vimaladitya
- Rajha Sarvaloksrya Rajanarendra Chola-Chalukya
- Rajha Sarvaloksrya Kulottunga Chola-Chalukya
- Rajha Vijayaditya Chola-Chalukya
- Rajha Mallavadeva Chola
- Rajha Upendra Bhupati I
- Rajha Kopparaja Bhupati
- Rajha Mana Bhupati
- Rajha Visveswara Bhupati
- Rajha Nagendra Bhupati
- Rajha Kumar-Yarrama Bhupati
- Rajha Singharaja Deva Rai Mahapatra

* Rajkumar Sridharajanarendra * Rajkumar Sarvaraja (secondary lineage)

- Rajha Sridharajanarendra Deva Rai Mahapatra
- Rajha Bahubalendra Gajapati Narasimha Deva Rai
- Rajha Bahubalendra Mukunda-Raj Deva Rai (Mukunda-raj lost their ancestral territory to Golconda Qutab Quli Saha)
- Bahubalendra Ananta Narayana Deva Rai {Migrated to Machamara due to political instability (in-present day, Near Parlakhemundi, Gajapati)}
- Bahubalendra Gaurava Deva Rai
- Bahubalendra Padmanabha Deva Rai
- Bahubalendra Sarangadhara Deva Rai
- Bahubalendra Visvanatha Deva Rai
- Bahubalendra Bankini DevaRai Samanta (Granted Village-Batisiripur Mandal from Gajapati Jagannatha Narayana Deba)
- Bahubalendra Dayanidhi Deva Rai Samanta
- Bahubalendra Laxmipati Deva Rai Samanta
- Bahubalendra Krushna Chandra Deva Rai Samanta
- Bahubalendra Devendra Deva Rai Samanta
- Bahubalendra Chandrasekhar Rai Samanta,(He adopted by his aunt, Rani Chandramani Patta Maha devi of Madugulu Estate)
- Bahubalendra Krushna Chandra Deo
- Bahubalendra Biranchi Narayana Deo, (Current Head Of Family)

== Medieval period ==
=== Gajapati Empire or Routray dynasty ===
- Kapilendra Deva (1435–67)
- Purushottama Deva (1467–97)
- Hamvira Deva (Defacto Gajapati of Southern territories of the Gajapati Empire 1472-76)
- Prataparudra Deva (1497–1540)
- Ramachandra Deva
- Purushottam Deva

Govinda Vidyadhara, the general of Prataparudra, killed Prataparudra's remaining sons in c. 1541 and began the Bhoi dynasty.

=== Early Bhoi dynasty ===
- Govinda Vidyadhara (1541–1548)
- Chakrapratapa (1548–1557)
- Narasimha Ray Jena (1557–1558)
- Raghuram Ray Chotaraya (1558–1560)

Bhoi dynasty was short-lived but during their reign, Orissa came into conflicts with the invaders from Golconda. After being deposed by Mukunda Deva, the dynasty shifts its power centre to Khurda where they continue as Rajas of Khurda.

=== Eastern Chalukya dynasty of Mukunda Deva ===
Mukunda Deva who traced his descent from the Eastern Chalukyas of Vengi rebelled and killed the last two successors of the Bhoi dynasty and declared himself an independent ruler in 1559 but Sulaiman Khan Karrani formed a kingdom in the region of Bengal which proved a potential threat to Mukunda Deva.

- Mukunda Deva (1560–68)

== Post-medieval period ==
=== Karranis of Bengal ===
Instigated by Mukunda Deva's alliance with Akbar, Sulaiman's army led by Kalapahad invaded Orissa in 1568. The Karranis of Bengal had control over much of Northern Odisha coast above Cuttack, the Bhoi dynasty ruled over Khordha, the Garhjat Kings had control over much of the interior regions of Odisha and the Southern Odisha coast including Northern Circars became a part of Golconda Sultanate in 1572.

- Sulaiman Khan Karrani (1568–1572)
- Bayazid Khan Karrani (1572)
- Daud Khan Karrani (1572–12 July 1576)

In the Battle of Tukaroi, which took place in modern-day Balasore, Daud was defeated and retreated deep into Orissa. The battle led to the Treaty of Katak in which Daud ceded the whole of Bengal and Bihar, retaining only Odisha. The treaty eventually failed after the death of Munim Khan (governor of Bengal and Bihar) who died at the age of 80. Sultan Daud Khan took the opportunity and invaded Bengal. This would lead to the Battle of Raj Mahal in 1576.

=== Qutb Shahi dynasty ===
Ibrahim Qutb Shah invaded South Odisha coast in 1572 and Balaram Dev of Jeypore accepted his suzerainty. In 1604 Mukunda Bahubalendra, a relative of Mukunda Deva who was ruling from Rajahmundry raised a revolt but was defeated.

- Ibrahim Qutb Shah (1572-1580)
- Muhammad Qutb Shah (1580-1612)
- Sultan Muhammad Qutb Shah (1612-1626)
- Abdullah Qutb Shah (1626-1672)
- Tana Shah (1672-1686)

=== Mughal Empire ===
- Qutlu Khan Lohani (former officer of Daud Khan Karrani, ruler of coastal Northeastern Orissa and south Bengal) (1576–1590)
- Nasir Khan (son of Qutlu Khan, Mughal vassal) (1590–1592)
- Man Singh I (Mughal Subahdar) (1592–1606)

Man Singh I attacked Nasir Khan when the later broke a treaty by attacking the temple town of Puri. Orissa was annexed into the Bengal subah (province).The Mughal rule was weak in the region, this allowed local chieftains to somewhat enjoy a semi-independence.

=== Nawab of Bengal ===
By 1717, with the weakening of Mughal Empire following Mughal–Maratha Wars in which the Marathas became the dominant power in the subcontinent, the Bhoi dynasty of Khurda kingdom and the semi-autonomous Garhjat kings of Odisha became independent of the Mughal sovereign authority, while the Nawabs of Bengal retained control over the Northern coast of Odisha from Cuttack to Subarnarekha river until the region was finally conquered by the Maratha Empire starting from the invasion in 1741 by 1751.

- Murshid Quli Khan (Nawab of Bengal) (1717–1727)
- Shuja-ud-Din (Nawab of Bengal) (1727–1739)
- Sarfaraz Khan (Nawab of Bengal) (1727 and 1739–1740)
- Alivardi Khan (Nawab of Bengal) (1740–1751)

The Nawabs of Bengal controlled the Northern Odisha coast from Cuttack to Subarnarekha river which was conquered by the Marathas and eventually ceded following the peace treaty in 1751.

=== Maratha Empire ===
The Maratha Empire general, Raghoji I Bhonsle of the Nagpur kingdom led the Maratha expeditions in Bengal in 1741 which extended Maratha control over Odisha and signed a treaty with Alivardi Khan in 1751, ceding the perpetuity of Cuttack up to the river Suvarnarekha to the Marathas.

- Raghoji I Bhonsle (Maratha general of Nagpur) (1751–1755)
- Janoji Bhonsle (1755–1772)
- Mudhoji Bhonsle (1772–1788)
- Raghoji II Bhonsle (1788–1803)

==== Maratha administrators ====
- Mir Habib (1751–1752)
- Mirza Saleh (1752–1759)
- Seo Bhatt Sathe (1760–1764)
- Bhawani Pandit (1764–1768)
- Sambhaji Ganesh (1768–1770)
- Babuji Naik (1770–1773)
- Madhaji Hari (1773–1777)
- Rajaram Pandit (1778–1793)
- Sadashiv Rao (1793–1803)

=== Later Bhanja dynasty states ===
==== Mayurbhanj ====
- Adi Bhanj (?Adi Bhanj II of the Bhanj dynasty) (12th cen CE)
- ...
- Savesvara Bhanj Deo (1688–1711)
- Viravikramaditya Bhanj Deo (1711–1728)
- Raghunath Bhanj Deo (1728–1750)
- Chakradhar Bhanj Deo (1750–1761)
- Damodar Bhanj Deo (1761–1796)
- Rani Sumitra Devi (f) – Regent of Mayurbhanj (1796–1810)
- Rani Jamuna Devi (f) – Regent of Mayurbhanj (1810–1813)
- Tribikram Bhanj Deo (1813–1822)
- Jadunath Bhanj Deo (1822–1863)
- Shrinath Bhanj Deo (1863–1868)
- Krishna Chandra Bhanj Deo (1868 – 29 May 1882)
- Sriram Chandra Bhanj Deo (29 May 1882 – 22 February 1912)
- Purna Chandra Bhanj Deo (22 February 1912 – 21 April 1928)
- Pratap Chandra Bhanj Deo (21 Apr 1928 – 1 January 1948)

==== Keonjhar ====
- Jyoti Bhanj (12th cen CE)
- ...
- Jagannath Bhanj (1688–1700)
- Raghunath Bhanj (1700–1719)
- Gopinath Bhanj (1719–1736)
- Narsingh Narayan Bhanj (1736–1757)
- Daneswar Narayan Bhanj (1757–1758)
- Jagateswar Narayan Bhanj (1758–1762)
- Pratap Balbhadra Bhanj (1762–1794)
- Janardan Bhanj (1794–1825)
- Gadadhar Narayan Bhanj Deo (1825 – 22 March 1861)
- Dhanurjai Narayan Bhanj Deo (4 September 1861 – 27 October 1905)
- Gopinath Narayan Bhanj Deo (27 Oct 1905 – 12 August 1926)
- Balbhadra Narayan Bhanj Deo (12 Aug 1926 – 1 January 1948)

==== Nilgiri ====
- Narayan Singh Bhujang Mandhata Birat Basant Harichandan (1521–1564)
- ...
- Ram Chandra Mardraj Harichandan (1797–1832)
- Govind Chandra Mardraj Harichandan (1832–1833)
- Chira Devi – Rani (1833–1843)
- Krishna Chandra Mardraj Harichandan (1843–1893)
- Shyam Chandra Mardraj Harichandan (1893-6 Jul 1913) (from the Bhanj dynasty of Mayurbhanj State)
- Kishor Chandra Mardraj Harichandan (6 July 1913 – 1 January 1948)

==== Baudh ====
The Baudh princely state had gradually become a small state after it had ceded away large sways of territories in the west and south to the Chauhans of Sambalpur and Daspalla region in Nayagarh which became a separate Bhanja princely state later.

- Ananga Bhanja (Ananga Deba) (14th cen CE)
- ...
- Siddhabhanja Deba (Siddheswar Deba) (1640s)
- Pratap Deba
- Bswambhar Deba (1778–1817)
- Chandrasekhar Deba (1817–1839)
- Pitamber Deo (1839-5 October 1879)
- Jogendra Deo (5 October 1879 – 1913)
- Narayan Prasad Deo (1913-1 January 1948)

==== Daspalla ====
The Daspalla Bhanja state was established by Sal Bhanja from the territories gifted to his father Narayan Bhanja Deo by his brother, the ruler of Baudh.

- Naren Bhanja (1498 CE)
- ...
- Chakradhar Deo Bhanja (1653–1701)
- Padmanav Deo Bhanja (1701–1753)
- Trilochan Deo Bhanja (1753–1775)
- Makunda Bhank Deo Bhanja (1775–1795)
- Guri Charan Deo Bhanja (1795–1805)
- Krishna Chanda Deo Bhanja (1805–1845)
- Madhusudan Deo Bhanja (1845–1861)
- Narsimha Deo Bhanja (1861–1873)
- Chaitan Deo Bhanja (1873–19 April 1897)
- Narayan Deo Bhanja (19 April 1897 – 11 Dec 1913)
- Kishor Chandra Deo Bhanja (11 December 1913 – 1 January 1948)

=== Later Chauhan rulers ===
==== Sonepur ====
The territory of Sonepur was procured by the Chauhans of Sambalpur from the Bhanja kings of Baudh.

- Madan Gopal (1650 – 1680 CE)
- Lal Sai Deo (1680–1689)
- Purusottam Deo (1689–1709)
- Raj Singh Deo (1709–1729)
- Achal Singh Deo (1729–1749)
- Divya Singh Deo (1749–1766)
- Jarawar Singh Deo (1766–1767)
- Sobha Singh Deo (1767–1781)
- Prithvi Singh Deo (1781–1841)
- Niladhar Singh Deo (1841 – 11 September 1891)
- Pratap Rudra Singh (11 September 1891 – 8 August 1902)
- Bir Mitrodaya Singh Deo (8 August 1902 – 29 April 1937)
- Sudhansu Shekhar Singh Deo (29 April 1937 – 1 January 1948)

==== Khariar ====
The third branch of Chauhan rulers descended in the line of Patna's Ramai Deva started their separate rule from Khariar in the seventeenth century.

- Gopal Rai (1600–1625)
- Ramsai Deo I
- Padman Rai
- Vishnu Rai
- Ghansi Rai Deo
- Gopinath Sai Deo
- Ramsai Deo II
- Balabhadra Sai
- Prataprudra Singh (1793–1818)
- Ratan Singh Deo (1818–1835)
- Sudarsan Singh Deo (1835–1849)
- Krishna Chandra Singh Deo (1849–1867)
- Padma Singh Deo (1867–1889)
- Brajraj Singh Deo (1889–1907)
- Vir Vikram Singh Deo (1907–1913)
- Artatran Singh Deo (1913–1946)
- Anup Singh Deo (1946 – until accession)

=== Later Nandapur-Jeypore rulers ===
After the death of Vishwanath Dev in 1571 the Qutb Shahis militarily encroached the eastern parts of the kingdom lying adjacent to Bay of Bengal which made Balaram Dev accept the suzerainty of Golconda.

Aurangzeb conquered Golconda in 1687 and the Circars along with the Jeypore Kingdom were annexed to the extensive empire of Aurangzeb. The successor of Raghunath Krishna Dev proved to be an inefficient ruler and as a result lost the vast territory of Northern Circars to their minister Viziaram Raz who formed the Vizianagaram State, who also adopted the title of Gajapati. However, the kings of Jeypore continued to rule their decreased kingdom independently until the advent of the British in 1777. The British destroyed the fort of Jeypore and granted them a demoted status of a Zamindari.

- Balaram Dev (1571–1597)
- Yashasvana Dev (1597–1637)
- Krishna Raj Dev (1637)
- Veer Vikram Dev (1637–1669)
- Krishna Dev (1669–1672)
- Vishwambhara Dev I (1672–1676)
- Mallakimardhana Krishna Dev (1676–1681)
- Hari Dev (1681–1684)
- Balaram Dev II (1684–1686)
- Raghunath Krishna Dev (1686–1708)
- Ramchandra Dev I (1708–1711)
- Balaram Dev III (1711–1713)
- Vishwambhara Dev II (1713–1752)
- Lal Krishna Dev (1752–1758)
- Vikram Dev I (1758–1781)
- Ramchandra Dev II (1781–1825)
- Vikram Dev II (1825–1860)
- Ramchandra Dev III (1860–1889)
- Vikram Dev III (1889–1920)
- Ramchandra Dev IV (1920–1931)
- Vikram Dev IV (1931–1951)

=== Later Bhoi dynasty ===
==== Khurda ====
After 1576 following the wars between the Afghans and Mughals which ended with the victory of the Mughals, and with the advent of Mughal rule in Odisha in 1592, the centre of power of Bhoi dynasty had shifted from Cuttack to Khurda. They continue to remain as vassal of the Mughal empire from 1592 until 1717 and later under the Maratha empire from 1741 until they were eventually ceded to the British empire under the control of the British East India Company in 1803 following the Second Anglo-Maratha War with the signing of the Treaty of Deogaon.

- Ramachandra Deva I (Abhinav Indradyumna) (1568–1600)
- Purusottam Deva (1600–1621)
- Narasingha Deva (1621–1647)
- Balabhadra Deva (1647–1657)
- Mukunda Deva I (1657–1689)
- Divyasingha Deva I (1689–1716)
- Harekrushna Deva (1716–1720)
- Gopinath Deva (1720–1727)
- Ramachandra Deva II (1727–1736)
- Birakesari Deva I (Bhagirathi Deva) (1736–1793)
- Divyasingha Deva II (1793–1798)
- Mukundeva Deva II (1798–1804) (titular till 1809)

The Rajas of Khurda continued to rule the region well into the early 1800s but by then their power had diminished. Then the Raja of Khurda along with other local chieftain led a series of rebellions against the British which was suppressed in 1804 and the kingdom was annexed by the British. The Raja of Khurda was exiled but later reinstated and shifted to Puri in 1809.

==== Puri ====
- Mukundeva Deva II (1809–1817) (reinstated and continues as Raja of Puri)
- Ramchandra Deva III (1817–1854)
- Birakesari Deva II (1854–1859)
- Divyasingha Deva III (1859–1882)
- Mukundeva Deva III (1882–1926)
- Ramchandra Deva IV (1926–1956)
- Birakisore Deva III (1956–1970)
- Divyasingha Deva IV (1970–current)

== British colonial period ==
Mukundeva Deva II was discontent under Maratha rule, so he agreed to help British troops to march through his territory without resistance. In 1803, Maratha ceded Orissa to the British empire. The Rajas and other local chieftains lead a series of rebellions against the British. Notable among the rebellions is that of Surendra Sai.

Odia speaking people at this time were placed in different provinces. Around 1870, a movement was started to unify the Oriya-speaking within a state. In 1936, the new state of Orissa was formed. About 25 princely states, remained independent but they were later integrated by 1947, except Saraikela, Kharsawan, Bastar, Parlakhemundi Zamindari (rest of today's Vijayanagaram).

=== Lieutenant governors and governors of Bihar and Orissa Province ===
- Sir Charles Stuart Bayley (1912–1915)
- Sir Edward Albert Gait (1915–1918) & (1918–1920)
- Sir Edward Vere Levinge (acting) (1918)
- Satyendra Prasanna Sinha, 1st Baron Sinha (1920–1921)
- Havilland Le Mesurier (acting) (1921–1922)
- Sir Henry Wheeler (1922–1927)
- Sir Hugh Lansdown Stephenson (1927–1932)
- Sir James David Sifton (1932–1936)

=== Governors of Orissa Province ===
- Sir John Austen Hubback (1936–1938) & (1938–1941)
- George Townsend Boag (Acting) (1938)
- Sir Hawthorne Lewis (1941–1946)
- Chandulal Madhavlal Trivedi (1946–1947)

=== Prime ministers of Orissa Province ===
- Krushna Chandra Gajapati (1937) & (1941–1944)
- Bishwanath Das (1937–1939)
- Harekrushna Mahatab (1946–1947)

== Post Independence ==
See: List of governors of Odisha
See: List of chief ministers of Odisha

== See also ==
- History of Orissa
- Maritime history of Orissa
