= Dharma Mahadevi =

Queen regnant of the Bhauma-Kara dynasty
- Reign: c. 940–950
- Predecessor: Vakula Mahadevi
- Successor: Monarchy abolished

Queen consort of the Bhauma-Kara dynasty
- Tenure: c. early 10th century
- Spouse: Santikaradeva III
- House: Bhauma-Kara dynasty (by marriage); Bhanj dynasty (by birth)
- Religion: Hinduism

Dharma Mahadevi (died 950) was the queen regnant of the Indian Bhauma-Kara dynasty's Kingdom of Toshala in circa 940-950.

She was born a princess of the Bhanj dynasty. She was married to Santikaradeva III.

She succeeded queen Vakula Mahadevi, her husband's sister-in-law. She is known to have issued two charters, one for Angul and another for Taltali. According to the Taltali plate, her titles were ‘Parama-bhattarika’, ‘Maharajadhiraja’ and ‘Paramesvari’. Not much is known about her rule.

She was the last ruler of the Bhauma-Kara dynasty. She was possibly assassinated by Yayati I of the Somavamshi dynasty, the brother of Tribhuvana Mahadevi II who had been deposed in 896; he drove the Bhanjas from the Baud-Sonepur region and then occupied the Odisha, leading to the Somavamsis taking over the administration of Tosali.
