= Sivakara Deva I =

- Unmattasimha or Unmattakeshari, Paramaposhaka, Paramatathagata

King of the Bhauma-Kara dynasty
- Reign: c. 756 - 790 AD
- Predecessor: Ksemankara Deva
- Successor: Subhakara Deva I
- Spouse: Jayavallabhi (Princess of Rarh)
- Issue: Subhakara deva I
- House: Bhauma-Kara dynasty
- Religion: Buddhism

Maharaja Sivakara Deva I or Sivakara Unmattasimha/ Unamattakeshari was a powerful monarch of the Bhaumakara dynasty who ruled in the late tertiary part of the 8th century A.D. He was the descendant of Ksemankara Deva who is believed to be the founder of the Bhaumakara rule in ancient Odra and also the earliest organizer of the Varna system in the region. Sivakara Deva I pursued a career of conquest in the eastern part of India establishing the Bhaumakaras as the supreme power in the whole region during his lifetime. According to the Talcher plate of Sivakaradeva III, Sivakaradeva I alias Unmattasimha defeated the king of Radha(south-West Bengal). When Unmattasimha was ruling in Orissa, Bengal was still in a state of disorder, and therefore the Radha king defeated by him can not be identified. However, Sivakara I either started ruling from 756 CE or 786 CE. He subjugated the Eastern Ganga rulers of Kalinga as his vassals. His dominions stretched from the border of Bengal in the north to the river Godavari in the south. He was a devout Buddhist who in 790 built the Sholampura Buddha Vihara and who adopted the epithets of Paramopasaka and Paramatathgata meaning a devout worshiper of Buddha which has been mentioned in the Neulpur charter of the Bhaumakaras. He sent a Buddhist scholar as an emissary to the Chinese emperor Te-tsong or Dezong with valuable Mahayana Buddhist manuscripts and established a new era of maritime trade and cultural relationship between ancient Odisha and China.

== Military Achievements ==
Sivakara Deva I is glorified as a military champion in eastern India across the inscriptions left by his descendants and others. The Talcher plates issued by one of his descendant Sivakara III compares him with the king Puru and states that he defeated and enslaved his enemies with his might. He is also described as an efficient archer in the battlefield being able to shoot multiple sharp arrows by drawing the bowstring until his ear.

=== Conquest of Rarh ===
Sivakara Deva I marched with a huge army on Rarh and conquered the opponent after a high pitched battle with the forces of Rarh which was situated in the northern part of the Bhaumakara territory. Historian R.C.Banarjee identifies the mention of Rarh in the Bhaumakara inscription with the territory that comprised around the modern Bankura district confined between the rivers Ajay and Rup Narayan. He married Jayavallabhi who was the princess of Rarh kingdom after defeating the enemy. Historians have placed the northern extent of the Bhaumakara kingdom during this era to be Dandabhukti or the area surrounding modern Medinapur and hence established that invasion of Rarh by Sivakara Deva I was just raid in order to subjugate the kingdom as feudal state under the Bhaumakara rule.

=== Conquest until River Godavari in the South ===
Sivakara Deva I sent his son Subhakara Deva I to conquer the southern territories of the early Eastern Ganga dynasty rulers which was also known as Svetaka Mandala or the heartland of Kalinga kingdom. The Dhenkanal charter of Tribhuvana Mahadevi I provides a poetic indication of a fierce battle between the armies Kalinga comprising large number of war elephants and that of Utkala's Bhaumakara dynasty which ended in the later's victory. The entire region from the rivers Rushikulya to Godavari was subjugated by the Bhaumakaras though allowing the Eastern Gangas to continue ruling as vassals under them. An Eastern Ganga king named as Jayavarmadeva mentioned himself as the vassal of Sivakara Deva I in his Ganjam grant and by whose permission he gave away the grants.

== Relations with the Tang dynasty of China and personality ==
Sivakara Deva I is also recorded to have sent an eminent Mahayana Buddhist scholar named as Prajna with the manuscript called Gandavyuha Sutra to the Tang court of emperor Dezong in China personally autographed by him. The monk Prajna who was a scholar in Buddhist studies at the monastery of Ratnagiri stayed in China for sometime and also translated the Buddhist manuscript Shat-paramita Sutra into Chinese. Sivakara Deva I is mentioned in the Chinese records as "the fortunate monarch who does what is pure, the lion". This initiation of overseas cultural exchange indicates the existence of regular maritime routes for trade and cultural exchange between ancient Odisha and China.

The king is recorded to have many qualities of that employed both his heart and mind. He encouraged new talents and was always accompanied by several scholars. He was effort bound to solve the difficulties of his people and always tried to meet their hopes. The Angul inscription of his descendant Dharma Mahadevi praises him as "Unmattasimha acquired the ever-lasting renown and resembled the moon covering all regions with great lustre and delighting people by dispelling the heat." The Dhenkanal charter of Tribhuvana Mahadevi I also praises him for the good qualities like spending money on the construction of various spiritual places, monasteries and temples. He avoided excess personal luxury and taxation of his subjects.
