= Gauri Mahadevi =

Queen regnant of the Kingdom of Toshala c.910-916

Queen regnant of the Bhauma-Kara dynasty
- Reign: c. 910-916
- Predecessor: Subhakaradeva V
- Successor: Dandi Mahadevi

Queen consort of the Bhauma-Kara dynasty
- Tenure: c. early 10th century
- Co-consort: Vakula Mahadevi
- Spouse: Subhakaradeva V
- Issue: Dandi Mahadevi
- House: Bhauma-Kara dynasty (by marriage)
- Religion: Hinduism

Gauri Mahadevi was the queen regnant of the Indian Bhauma-Kara dynasty's Kingdom of Toshala in c. 910-916. It is possible that she was in fact regent during the minority of her daughter queen Dandi Mahadevi, rather than a monarch in her own right.

She was married to Subhakaradeva V.

She succeeded her late spouse on the throne when he died. Not much is known about her reign. However, she is described as a successful ruler, who managed to maintain law and order within the kingdom. The Kumurang plate of Dandi Mahadevi stated that:

"….. at her lotus-like feet was prostrate the entire population (of the kingdom)".

In 916, she was succeeded by her daughter Dandi Mahadevi.
