= Dandi Mahadevi =

10th century queen regnant of Odisha

- Paramamahesvari, Paramabhattarika

Queen regnant of the Bhauma-Kara dynasty
- Reign: c. 916 - 936
- Predecessor: Gauri Mahadevi
- Successor: Vakula Mahadevi
- House: Bhauma-Kara dynasty (by birth)
- Father: Subhakaradeva V
- Mother: Gauri Mahadevi
- Religion: Hinduism

Dandi Mahadevi (died 936) was the queen regnant of the Indian Kingdom of Odisha circa 916-936.

She was the daughter of Subhakaradeva V and Gauri Mahadevi.

When her father died, he was succeeded by her mother. When her mother died, she succeeded her. She was given titles such as ‘Paramamahesvari’, ‘Paramabhattarika’, and ‘Maharajadhiraja Paramesvari’.

Numerous grants are preserved from her reign, such as the Kumurang grant, the grants from Santarigrama, Arual, Ambagan, and two to Ganjam. She also donated lands in Uttara Tosali and Dakshina Tosali. She is described as graceful and endowed with charm as well as a ruler with great authority. She reportedly protected the Bhaumakara dynasty’s borders from "formidable and hostile kings humbled by her prowess."

She died in childbirth and was succeeded by her stepmother Vakula Mahadevi.
