= Tribhuvana Mahadevi III =

9th century queen regnant of Toshala

- Paramesvari

Queen regnant of the Bhauma-Kara dynasty
- Reign: c.896 - 905
- Predecessor: Tribhuvana Mahadevi II
- Successor: Shantikaradeva III

Queen consort of the Bhauma-Kara dynasty
- Tenure: c. late 9th century
- Spouse: Sivakaradeva III
- House: Bhauma-Kara dynasty (by marriage)
- Religion: Hinduism

Tribhuvana Mahadevi III (died 905), was the queen regnant of the Indian Bhauma-Kara dynasty's Kingdom of Toshala in 896-905.

She was married to Sivakara III. Her spouse succeeded his brother Subhakaradeva IV in 882. When he died in 890, he was succeeded by his brothers widow Tribhuvana Mahadevi II, who was supported by her father, a foreign king.

In 896, the officials of the court assisted her in a coup to depose her sister-in-law and assume the throne. She took titles such as ‘Parama-bhattarika’, ‘Maharajadhiraja’ and ‘Paramesvari’. She was praised for magnanimity, courtesies, grace, beauty and bravery. She was a devout Vaisnava.

According to the Dhenkanal Charter she granted the village Kontaspara to the astrologer Bhatta Jagadhar for the purpose of bringing down rain and averting death.

She was succeeded by her late spouse's sons Shantikaradeva III and Subhakaradeva V.
