= Vakula Mahadevi =

Queen regnant of the Bhauma-Kara dynasty
- Reign: c. 936–940
- Predecessor: Dandi Mahadevi
- Successor: Dharma Mahadevi

Queen consort of the Bhauma-Kara dynasty
- Tenure: c. early 10th century
- Co-consort: Gauri Mahadevi
- Spouse: Subhakaradeva V
- House: Bhauma-Kara dynasty (by marriage); Bhanj dynasty (by birth)
- Religion: Hinduism

Vakula Mahadevi, was the queen regnant of the Indian Bhauma-Kara dynasty's Kingdom of Toshala in circa 936–940.

She was born a princess of the Bhanj dynasty. She was married to Subhakaradeva V. Her spouse was first succeeded by his other widow Gauri Mahadevi, and then by their daughter Dandi Mahadevi.

In 936, her stepdaughter queen Dandi Mahadevi died in childbirth. Vakula Mahadevi succeeded her on the throne. Very little is known about her reign. She is known to have made a donation of a village in Uttara Tosali. Her reign demonstrate the introduction of the Bhanj dynasty in the affair of the kingdom.

She was succeeded by queen Dharma Mahadevi, her husband's sister-in-law.
