= Jaya Chandrika =

The Jaya Chandrika, also known as the Jayachandrika, is a historical work composed in 1792 by Prahallad Dubey, the court poet of Sarangarh. It was written in the Lariya language for Chauhan, the ruler of Sambalpur.

== Plot ==
Jay Chandirka narrates the tale, about the defeat and death of Prthviraj Chauhan at the hands of the Muslims. During this conflict, Chauan's queen escaped to Patnagarh in West Odisha and was sheltered in the house of Chakradhara Panigrahi, where she gave birth to Ramai Deva. Deva eventually became the founder of Chauhan rule in West Odisha.

The story is told with some modifications in the Gazetteers, travel accounts and Indigenous records dealing with the Chauhanas of Odisha.
