= Tribhuvana Mahadevi II =

9th century queen regnant of Toshala

Queen regnant of the Bhauma-Kara dynasty
- Reign: c. 890 - 896
- Predecessor: Sivakaradeva III
- Successor: Tribhuvana Mahadevi III

Queen consort of the Bhauma-Kara dynasty
- Tenure: c. late 9th century
- Spouse: Subhakara IV
- House: Bhauma-Kara dynasty (by marriage); Somavamshi dynasty (by birth)
- Father: Janmejaya I
- Religion: Hinduism

Tribhuvana Mahadevi II also known as Prithivi Mahadevi, was the queen regnant of the Indian Bhauma-Kara dynasty's Kingdom of Toshala in Kalinga in 890-896 AD.

== Life ==
She was born to king Janmejaya I of the Somavamshi dynasty kingdom. She was married to Subhakara IV or Kusumahara II (r. 865-882). The couple had no survivning heir. When her spouse died, he was succeeded by his brother Sivakaradeva III (r. 882-890).

When king Sivakaradeva III died in 890, she succeeded him on the throne. This was possibly because of the influence of her father. She is known to have given great tribute to her father in her charters. According to the Brahmesvara inscription of Somavamsi from the reign of King Udyotakesari Mahabhavagupta, her father Janmejaya “drew to himself the fortune of the King of Odra country, who was killed in battle by his Kunta.”

Her reign was supported by her father. When the Kalachuri king Sankaragana invaded Kosala, and her father Janmejaya I engaged in combat with the aggressor, the Bhauma-Kara dynasty’s officials supported a coup by the queen's sister-in-law, the widow of Sivakaradeva III, who deposed Tribhuvana Mahadevi II and replaced her on the throne as Tribhuvana Mahadevi III.

After the deposition, former queen Tribhuvana Mahadevi II returned to live with her father in Kosala.
