= Tribhuvana Mahadevi I =

- Paramavaishnavi, Katyayani

Queen regnant of the Bhauma-Kara dynasty
- Reign: 845-850
- Predecessor: Shubhakara-deva III
- Successor: Santikara Deva II (Grandson)

Queen consort of the Bhauma-Kara dynasty
- Tenure: c. early 9th century
- Born: Goswamini Devi
- Spouse: Santikara Deva I
- Issue: Shubhakara-deva III
- House: Bhauma-Kara dynasty (by marriage); Western Ganga dynasty (by birth)
- Father: Rachamalla I
- Religion: Hinduism

Paramavaishnavi Goswamini Devi or Tribhuvana Mahadevi I (Odia: ପ୍ରଥମ ତ୍ରିଭୁବନ ମହାଦେବୀ) was the first female ruler of the Bhaumakara Dynasty in ancient Odisha and the widow of King Santikara Deva I. She ascended the throne of Toshali (Utkala) between 843–845 A.D. and reigned until 850 A.D., becoming the first sovereign queen in the Indian subcontinent, following the premature death of her ruling son Subhakara III. Some historians believe that she may have ruled until 863 A.D., abdicating the throne in favor of her grandson Santikara II after he became old enough to administer the kingdom.

She was a very powerful female ruler and found appreciating mentions as a beholder of lavish power and prestige by the Arab and Persian geographer Ibn Khordadbeh and explorer Ahmad Ibn Rustah. She rose to power despite feudal kings of coastal-central parts of erstwhile Tri-Kalinga region rebellions and with the help her powerful father. She compared herself with the Goddess Katyayani (a form of Goddess Shakti) when she ascended the throne at Guheswarapataka mentioned in her Dhenkanal charter. She is also credited for the construction of the Baitala Deula which is one of the oldest surviving temple structures standing erect to this day in old Bhubaneswar and one of the few in Odisha built in Khakara style temple architecture.

== Origin and Personality of the Queen ==
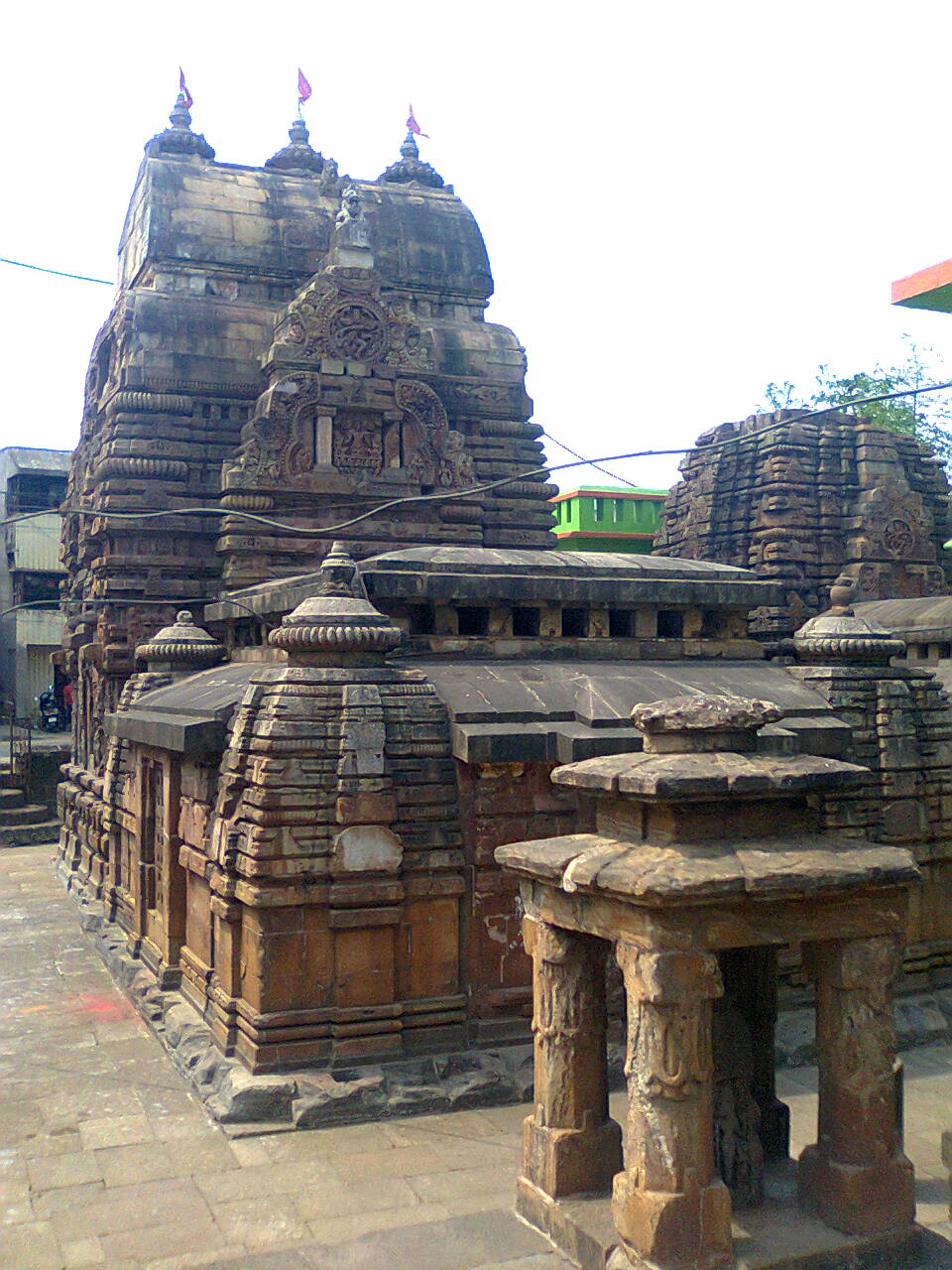
Vaitala Deula or Baitala Temple at Bhubaneswar Built by Tribhuvana Mahadevi in a mixed Kalingan and Dravidian architecture

Originally according to a copper plate preserved in the palace of the ruling dynasty of Hindol State and one discovered in Bhimanagari garh in Dhenkanal, Tribhuvana Mahadevi belonged to Nagadbhava-kula and was the daughter of Shri Rajamalladeva, which was linked with Pallava dynasty. But later scholars corrected it to Nagodbhava-kula, which could mean the Ganga dynasty or the Sailodbhava dynasty. Hence, the king Rachamalla I or Rajamalla I of the Western Gangas has been identified as her father. Her descendant Sivakara III mentions in his inscriptions that Tribhuvana mahadevi I was filled with three energies Mantra Shakti (the power of divine chants), Prabhu Shakti (Spiritualism) and Utsaha Shakti (energetic). She was described as a Pitrabhakta (devout child to her parents) meditating at the feet of her parents. Her Dhenkanal charter has associated full imperial epithets to her and describes that as a person she was adorned with hundreds of auspicious signs to be a superior ruler in the world. She was a devout Vaishnavite who worshiped Hari and took the epithet as Paramavaishnavi.

== Ascension to the Throne ==
The Dhenkanal charter issued by Tribhuvana mahadevi I describes her ascension as " her lotus-like feet being softly kissed by the crowns and headpieces of the great vassal and feudal kings, bowing down in devoted loyalty before her and the foot-stool of her late husband became radiant with the splendor of the diamonds in those diadems of the subjugated kings". In the preceding years before the ascension of her husband Santikara I, the Pala dynasty king Devapala had defeated the reigning king Sivakara II and subjugated the Bhaumakara rulers in Odisha. The dynasty had lost its prestige and power after this defeat which was followed by disorder in the kingdom. The subsequent deaths of Santikara I and Subhakara III as the male eligible heirs, gave rise to rebellion by feudal kings. The inscriptions of later Bhaumakara kings states that the widowed queen took upon the burden of administration of the entire kingdom and shone like Sesha, holding up the entire earth on her hood. The queen herself has credited her father to have come to rescue of the Bhaumakara rule suppressing the rebellions and helping her restore authority and order in the kingdom.

== Administration of the Kingdom ==
According to the charters issued by her and her descendants she is credited to have ensured an effective administration of the kingdom and prosperity of the people. Talcher plate of Subhakara IV states that during her rule the country advanced in administration, enemies were destroyed, the glory of the kingdom spread abroad and the people lived in harmony. She paid special attention in appointment of responsible and honest royal officials and the vassals of the kingdom stayed loyal to her supremacy. She exerted Mrudukara (light taxation) on her people. Her Dhenkanal charter talks about how Bhaumas exhausted treasures of their vast empire on religious works in order to enlighten their own country and others, and decorated the earth by constructing in unbroken continuity, various mathas, monasteries and temples.

During her rule and as evident from her grants and charter issued during her rule, she patronized Vaishnavism, Shaivism and Shaktism while the existence of the Jain and Buddhist ideologies in the kingdom remained uninfluenced by any kind of threat. Women in the kingdom were educated and able exert special powers and administrative rights for issuing land grants and charters. She was able to suppress internal rebellions and expel the enemy forces of the Rashtrakutas and Palas with the help of her father securing the kingdom from any external threats. She commanded a standing army of 3,00,000 men and women were also believed to have indulged in military affairs. She restored stability to the kingdom after a long era of chaos and disorder initiating a golden era of stability, economic prosperity and cultural growth. She served as an example for a line of another six descendant female rulers who ruled in the Bhaumakara kingdom in their own rights despite the availability of heirs and two of which even adopted her royal epithet as Tribhuvana Mahadevi.
