= Tabūʿa =

Tabūʿa (Old Arabic: Tabūʿa; Akkadian: 𒋫𒁍𒀀, romanized: Tabua) was a queen regnant of the Nomadic Arab tribes of Qedar. She ruled in the 7th century BCE, specifically c. 681–676 BCE. She succeeded queen Te'el-hunu.

== Life ==
Tabua was the fifth of six Arab queens to be attested (as sarratu) in Assyrian documents between Tiglath-pileser III and Assurbanipal, who were Zabibe, Samsi, Yatie, Te'el-hunu, Tabua and Adia. Tabua's early life is not well-known, except for the fact that she was raised by Sennacherib as his daughter to be the new queen of the Arabs. Some have theorized that Tabua was Te'el-hunu's and Sennacherib's child, who was born during the captivity of the former; however this theory remains highly speculative.

During the rule of Esarhaddon, Tabua was sent back to Dumat al-Jandal to rule as a queen and partner of the new vassal king of Qedar, Ḫazaʾil. The idols of the Qedarites, which included al-Lat, were also returned back to them. She had a short reign, which may either mean she had died, retired, or the Qedarites had overthrown her and replaced her with another queen.
