= Teʾelḫunu =

- Queen of Qedar
- Reign: c. 690 BCE
- Predecessor: Possibly Yatie
- Successor: Ḫazaʾil
- Born: c. end of the 8th century BCE
- Religion: North Arabian polytheism

Teʾelḫunu (Akkadian: 𒋼𒀪𒂖𒄷𒉡, romanized: Teʾelḫunu), also spelled Telkhunu, was a queen regnant of the Nomadic Arab tribes of Qedar who ruled in the 7th century BC, circa 690 BC. She succeeded Yatie and was succeeded by queen Tabua.

She was the fourth of six Arab queens to be attested (as sarratu) in Assyrian documents between Tiglath-pileser III and Assurbanipal: Zabibe, Samsi, Yatie, Te'el-hunu, Tabua and Adia. According to Assyrians texts, she also served as apkal-latu (priestess) of her people.

In 690 BC, the Assyrians under Sennacherib put an end to any potential threat to Assyria from the southwest after the defeat of queen Te'el-hunu and her "male associate" Ḫazaʾil, pillaged Adummatu and brought the queen captive to Nineveh with a great booty of camels, divine statues, spices and jewels.

When Esarhaddon became king of Assyria, he made peace with the Qedarites in Adummatu by sending back the divine statues of Alilat, Nuhay and Orotalt along with Princess Tabua, the relative and successor of Te'el-hunu, who may have been the daughter of Te'el-hunu and Sennacherib.
