= Adia (disambiguation) =

"Adia" is a 1998 song by Sarah McLachlan.

Adia may also refer to:

- Adia (fly), a genus of insect
- Adia (musician), Destiny Adia Andrews (born 1991), American Christian R&B artist
- Adia (name), with a list of people named Adia
- Adia (queen), Arab figure associated with the ancient Kingdom of Qeda
- ADIA, the Abu Dhabi Investment Authority
