= Qedarites =

700s–100s BC northern Arab tribal confederation

Qedarite Confederation 𐪄𐪕𐪇
- 9th century BCE–1st century BCE
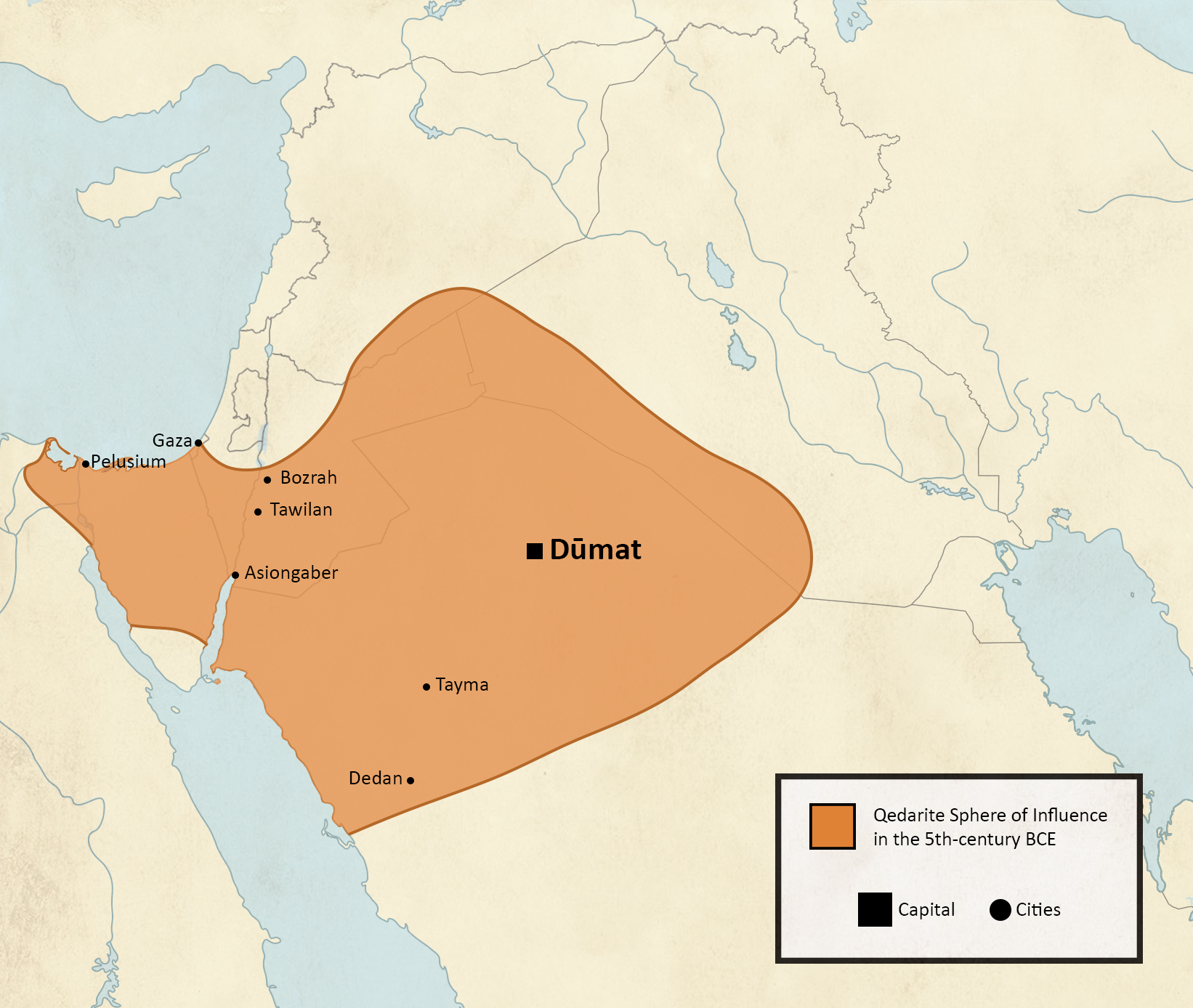
- Qedarites in the 5th century BCE
- Capital: Dūmat
- Common languages: Dumaitic; Old Arabic; Aramaic
- Religion: North Arabian polytheism
- Government: Monarchy
- Monarch
  - 750–735 BCE: Queen Zabibe (first)
  - 430–410 BCE: King Qainū bar Gešem (last)
- Historical era: Antiquity
  - Established: 9th century BCE
  - Absorbed into the Nabataean state: 1st century BCE
Succeeded by
Nabataean Kingdom

The Qedarites (Ancient North Arabian: 𐪄𐪕𐪇, romanized: qdr) were an ancient Arab tribal confederation centred in their capital Dumat al-Jandal in the present-day Saudi Arabian province of Al-Jawf. Attested from the 9th century BCE, the Qedarites formed a powerful polity which expanded its territory throughout the 9th to 7th centuries BCE to cover a large area in northern Arabia stretching from Transjordan in the west to the western borders of Babylonia in the east, before later consolidating into a kingdom that stretched from the eastern limits of the Nile Delta in the west till Transjordan in the east and covered much of southern Judea (then known as Idumea), the Negev and the Sinai Peninsula.

The Qedarites played an important role in the history of the Levant and North Arabia, where they enjoyed close relations with the nearby Canaanite and Aramaean states and became important participants in the trade of spices and aromatics imported into the Fertile Crescent and the Mediterranean world from South Arabia. Having engaged in both friendly ties and hostilities with the Mesopotamian powers such as the Neo-Assyrian and Neo-Babylonian empires, the Qedarites eventually became integrated within the structure of the Achaemenid Empire. Closely associated with the Nabataeans, who may have eventually assimilated the Qedarites at the end of the Hellenistic period.

The Qedarites also feature within the scriptures of Abrahamic religions, where they appear in the Hebrew and Christian Bible as the eponymous descendants of Qaydar, the second son of Isma'il, himself the son of Ibrahim. Within Islamic tradition, some scholars claim that the Islamic prophet Muhammad was descended from Isma'il through Qaydar.

== Name ==
The name of the Qedarites is recorded in Old Arabic inscriptions written using the Ancient North Arabian script as 𐪄𐪕𐪇 (qdr), and in Classical Arabic as قيدر (Qaydar) and قيدار (Qaydār).

The name of the Qedarites is recorded in Aramaic as 𐡒𐡃𐡓𐡉𐡍 (qdryn) in Achaemenid and Hellenistic period ostraca found at Maresha.

Assyrian records have transcribed in Neo-Assyrian Akkadian various variants of the name of the Qedar tribe under the forms of Qidri, Qīdri, Qidrāya, Qidari, Qadari, Qādri, Qidarāya, and Qudari. In one Neo-Assyrian letter, the Qedarites are referred to as Gidrāya, reflecting the use of a voiced qāf, similarly to the one used in the present-day Hejazī dialect of Arabic.

In the Hebrew Bible, the Qedarites are referred to in Hebrew as קֵדָר (Qēḏār; Ancient Greek: Κηδάρ, romanized: Kēdár).

The Qedarites were also mentioned in Old South Arabian inscriptions as the 𐩤𐩵𐩧𐩬 qdrn (Qadirān or Qadrān).

Latin sources mention the Qedarites as the Cedrei.

== Geography ==
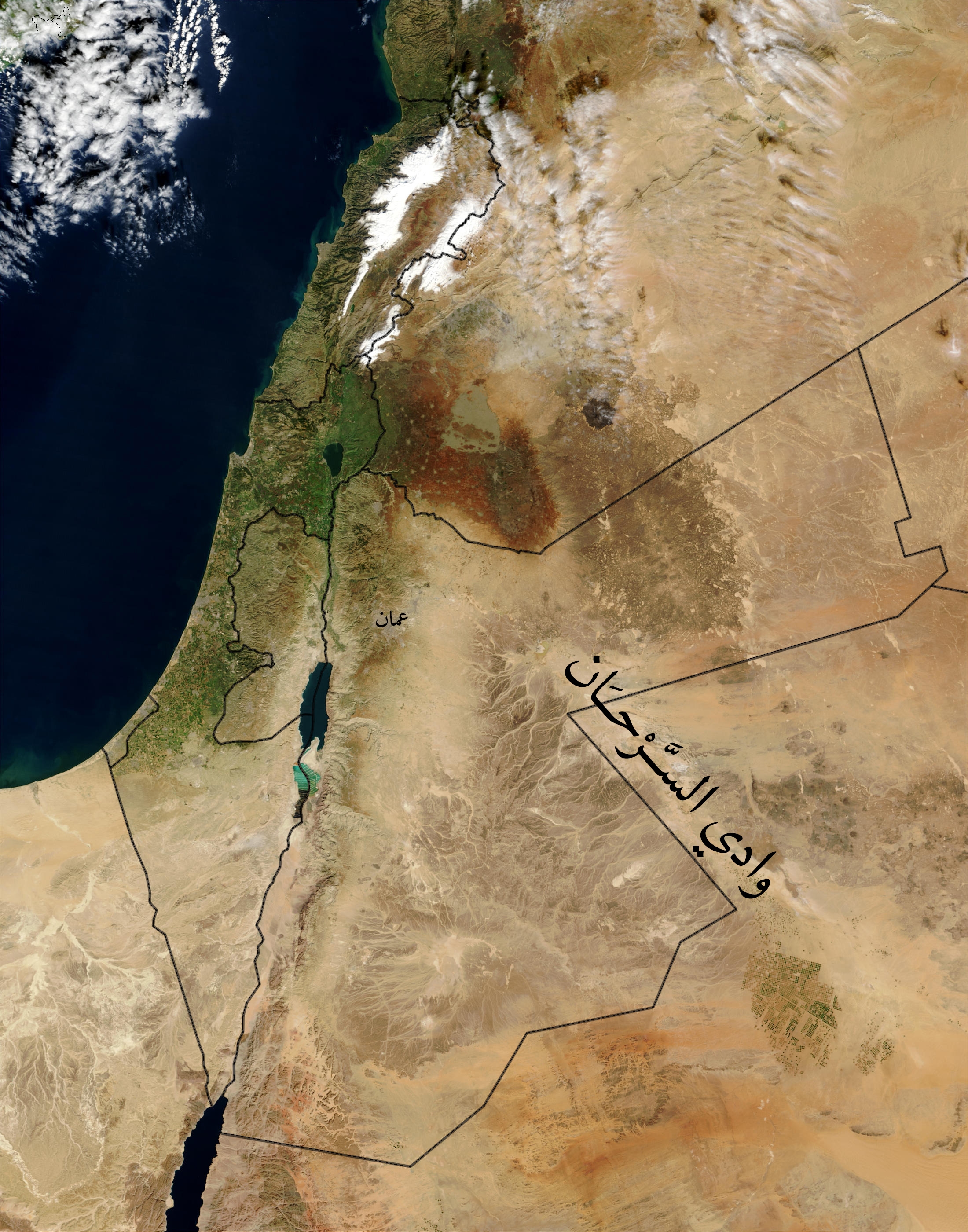
Wadi Sirhan (to the east, inscribed in Arabic), the core territory of the Qedarites

During the second half of the 9th century BCE, the Qedarites were living to the east of Transjordan and to the south-east of Damascus, within the southwestern Syrian Desert in the region of the Wadi Sirhan, more specifically in the Jauf depression in its eastern part, where was located the Qedarites' main centre of Dūmat or ad-Dūmat (Ancient North Arabian: 𐪕𐪃𐪉, romanized: dmt; recorded in Akkadian as Adummatu). Dūmat's location halfway between Syria and Babylonia and halfway between the Persian Gulf and the Gulf of Aqaba, as well as its relative water richness and its orchards made it the most important oasis of all North Arabia and gave it the position of being a main stop on the roads which connected Al-Hirah, Damascus and Yathrib.

At the time of the 7th century BCE, the Qedarites had expanded eastwards so that their kingdom adjoined the western border of Babylonia, In the western Syrian Desert, the Qedarites adjoined the western section of the Fertile Crescent on the eastern border of the Levant, and before the conquest of Syria by the Neo-Assyrian Empire, the neighbours of the Qedarite Arabs to the west were the Aramaean kingdom of Damascus and the Canaanite kingdoms of Ammon, Edom, Israel, and Moab. After the Neo-Babylonian Empire destroyed the Canaanite kingdoms of Ammon, Judah, and Moab, followed by the Persian Achaemenid's annexation of Babylonia, the Qedarites expanded westwards into the eastern and southern Levant until their territory included the northern Sinai and they controlled the desert region which bordered ancient Israel and the eastern border of Egypt and of the Nile Delta.

== Identification ==
The Qedarites were an Arab tribal confederation who were closely related to the other ancient Arabian populations of North Arabia and the Syrian Desert. Under the reigns of the Neo-Assyrian kings Esarhaddon and Ashurbanipal, Assyrian records referred to the Qedarites as being almost synonymous with the Arabs as a whole.

The location of the Qedarites within the Neo-Assyrian Empire at the time of Ashurbanipal.

Although the Assyriologists Friedrich Delitzsch, R.C. Thompson and Julius Lewy had identified the Qedarite tribe of the 𒆳𒋢𒈬𒀭 (ᵏᵘʳŠumuʾilu) with the Biblical Ishmaelites (Biblical Hebrew: יִשְׁמְעֵאלִים, romanized: Yīšməʿēlīm) and considered the Akkadian name Šumuʾilu as derivative of Yīšməʿēlīm, the scholar Israel Ephʿal has criticised this identification on several grounds:

- Ephʿal's criticism of the identification on historical grounds rests on three arguments:
  - The term "Ishmaelites" only appear in Biblical sources relating to the period before the reign of the Israelite king David;
  - The term "Arabs" starts appearing for the first time in Mesopotamian sources the middle of the 9th century BCE;
  - Neither the Assyrian nor the Biblical sources ever identify or even connect the names "Arabs" and Ishmaelites.
- Ephʿal's criticism of the identification on phonetic grounds rests on two arguments:
  - the name Yīšmāʿēʾl is already attested in early Akkadian under the forms 𒁹𒅖𒈣𒅋 and 𒁹𒅖𒈠𒀭 (ᵐIšmail), 𒁹𒅖𒈠𒄿𒈝 (ᵐIšmailum) and 𒁹𒅀𒀾𒈠𒄴𒀭 (ᵐIasmaḫil) and in later Akkadian under the forms 𒁹𒅀𒋛𒈨𒀪𒀭 (ᵐIasimeʾilu) and 𒁹𒅖𒈨𒀭 (ᵐIšmeilu);
  - likewise, the Hebrew form of Akkadian Šumuʾilu would have been שֻׁמֻאֵל (Šūmūʾēl) or שֻׂמֻאֵל (Sūmūʾēl) rather than ישמעאל (Yīšmāʿēl).

== History ==
=== Neo-Assyrian period ===
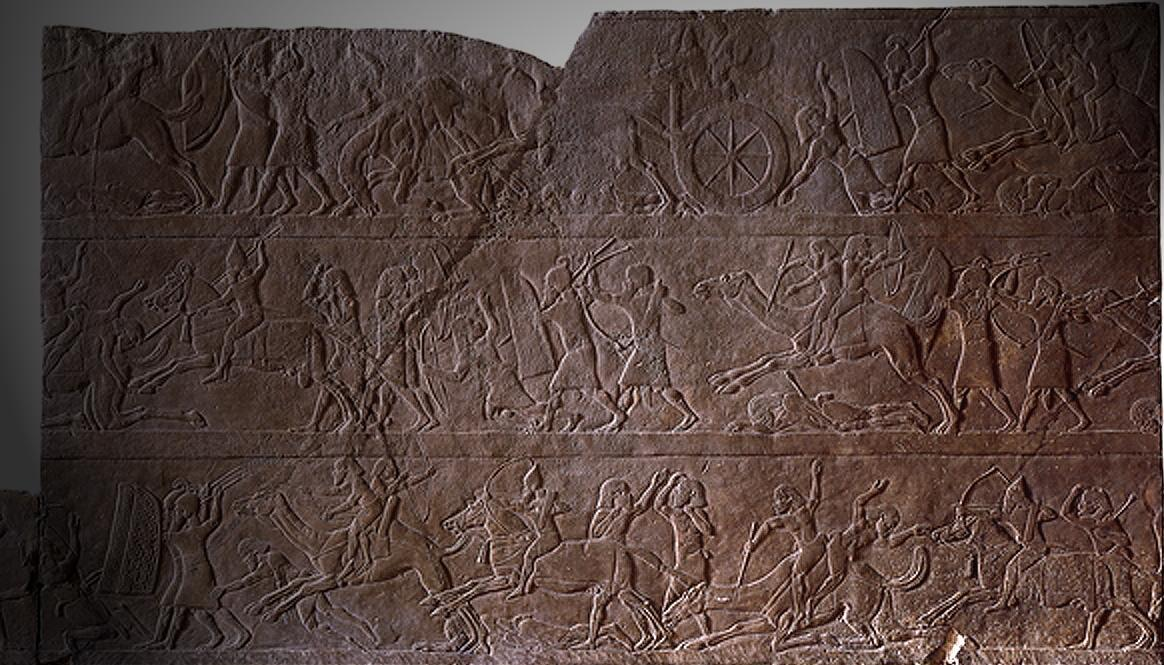
Assyrian relief depicting a battle between Assyrian soldiers and Qedarite Arab warriors.

During the 9th century BCE, the Qedarite confederation was centered around the region of the Wadi Sirhan, and it had commercial interests in the trade and border routes of the Syrian Desert. To the west, the borderlands of the Qedarites bordered on the powerful kingdoms of Damascus and Israel in the west, although the Qedarites themselves were independent of Damascene hegemony. The Qedarite king Gindibuʾ during this period enjoyed good relations with the Aramaean kingdom of Zobah, and, the Qedarites being transhumant nomads, they would bring their flocks to the summer pastures of the lower Orontes or the Anti-Lebanon Mountains in Zobah while spending the winter in the regions to the east and south-east of these mountains.

The earliest known activities of the Qedarites date from between 850 and 800 BC, when their king Gindibuʾ allied with his powerful neighbours, the kings Hadadezer of Aram-Damascus and Ahab of Israel, against the rising Neo-Assyrian Empire. Although Gindibuʾ's kingdom was not in danger of being attacked by the Assyrians, the Qedarite rulers participated in the trade which passed through Damascus and Tyre, and Damascus and Israel controlled crucial parts of the trade routes as well as the pastures and water sources which were of vital importance to the nomadic Qedarites, especially in drought periods. This meant that the rise of Assyrian power in the 9th century BCE put the desert and border routes where Gindibuʾ had economic interests under threat of Assyrian disruptions, fearing which Gindibuʾ led 1000 camelry troops at the Battle of Qarqar in 853 BCE on the side of the alliance led by Aram-Damascus and Israel against Shalmaneser III of Assyria.

Before the ascent of Assyrian hegemony, the Qedarite confederation was a polity of significant importance in the region of the Syrian Desert, and, beginning in the 8th and lasting until the 5th or 4th centuries BCE, the Qedarites were the hegemons among the Syrian Desert nomads, dominating the northwestern section of the Arabian peninsula in alliance with the local rulers of the kingdom of Dadān.

The alliance of Qarqar soon fell apart after Hadadezer of Damascus died and was succeeded by his son Hazael, who declared war on Israel and killed its king Jehoram and the Judahite king Ahaziah near Ramoth-Gilead in 842 BCE; the consequent ascension of Jehu to the throne of Israel did not end the hostilities between Damascus and Israel. Despite this significant change, the Qedarites continued enjoying good relations with Damascus.

Shalmaneser III later campaigned to Damascus and Mount Hauran in 841 BCE, but his inscriptions mentioned neither the Qedarite kingdom nor Gindibuʾ himself or any successor of his. The Qedarites were not mentioned either in the list of rulers, including those of distant places such as Philistia, Edom, and Israel, who paid tribute to Adad-nirari III after the latter's defeat of Bar-Hadad III of Damascus in 796 BCE. This reason for absence the Assyrian records is that the kingdom of Gindibuʾ was far from the campaign routes of the Assyrians during the later 9th century BCE.

Following the rise in the Armenian highlands of a powerful rival of the Neo-Assyrian Empire the form of the kingdom of Urartu, which, just like Assyria, was interested in the rich states of northern Syria, in 743 BCE the Assyrian king Tiglath-Pileser III started a series of campaigns in Syria which would result in this region's absorption into the Neo-Assyrian Empire, and the first phase of which was the defeat in that very year of an alliance consisting of Urartu and the Aramaean states of Melid, Gurgum, Kummuḫ, Bit Agusi, and ʿUmqi, after which he besieged Bit Agusi's capital of Arpad, which was Urartu's principal ally, for two years before capturing it. While Tiglath-Pileser III was campaigning against Urartu in 739 BCE, the Levantine states formed a new alliance, headed by the king Azriya'u of Ḥamat, and including various Phoenician cities ranging from Arqa to Ṣumur and multiple Aramaean states from Samʾal in the north to Ḥamat in the south, which was defeated by Tiglath-Pileser III in 738 BCE.

After this triumph of Assyrian hegemony in the western Fertile Crescent, the rulers of Damascus, Tyre and Israel accepted Assyrian overlordship and paid tribute to Tiglath-Pileser III. Since the Qedarite rulers participated in the trade which passed through Damascus and Tyre, they sought to preserve the Arabian commercial activities and the revenues that they acquired from these, and consequently the Qedarite queen Zabibe joined the kings Rezin of Damascus, Menahem of Israel, Hiram II of Tyre, as well as other various rulers from southern Anatolia, Syria and Phoenicia in acknowledging Assyrian hegemony and paying tribute to Tiglath-Pileser III in 738 BCE. The tribute of Zabibe consisted of camels, but did not include frankincense or perfumes as the Qedarites would later offer the Assyrians because they had not yet become participants in the trade of aromatics produced in South Arabia. Tiglath-Pileser III's inscriptions recording this tribute payment constitutes the first explicit mention of the Qedarites by name.

During the 8th century itself, the North Arabian region acquired increased economic importance, with the northern Hejaz becoming a transit zone for the trade of goods imported from 'Asir and from Africa across the Red Sea. This, in turn, led to increasing interest to control this region by the Assyrians.

Once Tiglath-Pileser III had returned to Assyria, the king Rezin of Damascus organised an anti-Assyrian alliance in Syria which was supported by Pekah of Israel and Hiram II of Tyre, and which started a revolt against Assyrian hegemony by the cities on the coast of the Levant. Tiglath-Pileser III retaliated by campaigning in 734 BCE against the southern Levantine coast until the Brook of Egypt and successfully managed to establish control over the commercial activities between the Phoenicians, the Egyptians and the Philistines. Among the many rulers in the western Fertile Crescent who pledged allegiance to Tiglath-Pileser III as result of this campaign in Palestine was the Qedarite queen Šamši.

Tiglath-Pileser III's campaign had not only disrupted the interests of Tyre, Damascus, Israel and the Qedarites but also resulted in the formation of a pro-Assyrian alliance consisting of Arwad, Ashkelon and Gaza, soon joined by Judah, Ammon, Moab, and Edom, who became players in Syrian politics with the goal of countering the anti-Assyrian alliance led by Damascus, Israel, Qedar and Tyre. However, the alliance headed by Damascus continued its anti-Assyrian activities, which caused the pro-Assyrian alliance to disintegrate, with Ashkelon and Edom soon defecting to the pro-Assyrian side. And since the Qedarites were still participating in the trade networks passing through Damascus and Israel, who themselves controlled important parts of the Arabian commercial route as well as pasture and water sources on which the Qedarites depended, especially during periods of drought, Šamši followed Rezin, Pekah, and Hiram II in rebelling against Assyrian authority in 733 BCE.

During the reign of Tiglath-Pileser III itself, the Qedarites invaded Moab and killed the inhabitants of its capital city of Qir-Mōʾāb.

When Judah remained loyal to Assyria, Rezin and Pekah attacked it, starting the Syro-Ephraimite War, in retaliation of which Tiglath-Pileser III in turn attacked Damascus in 733 and 732 BCE. As part of his intervention in Syria, Tiglath-Pileser III also attacked and defeated the Qedarites in the region of Mount Saqurri (Often identified with Jabal al-Druze), forcing Šamši to flee to the Wadi Sirhan, and taking significant spoils from them, including spices, which are first mentioned in relation with the Qedarites in Tiglath-Pileser III's records relating to this campaign, and cultic utensils like the resting places of the Qedarite gods as well as their goddess's sceptres. While Rezin would be executed and his kingdom annexed by the Assyrians and Peqaḥ was assassinated, Tiglath-Pileser III allowed Šamši to retain her position as the ruler of the Qedarites and appointed an Arab as qēpu (overseer for the count of Assyria) in Qedar to prevent her from providing aid to Damascus during the campaign in which the Assyrians annexed its territory, and to manage the Qedarites' commercial activities. This mild treatment of Šamši was due to the fact that the Qedarites by then had become wealthier and more powerful, and the Assyrians were interested in products, such as camels, cattle and spices which they could obtain from the Qedarites, as well as in preserving the administrative and social structures of the peoples of the Assyrian border regions who played an important role in international commerce and thus ensured the stability of the Neo-Assyrian Empire's economy. The arrangement between the Assyrians and the Qedarites established at the end of Tiglath-Pileser III's campaign in Palestine satisfied both parties enough that Šamši remained loyal to Assyria and later paid Tiglath-Pileser III a tribute of 125 white camels. Among the other Arabian populations around the southern Levant who offered tribute to Tiglath-Pileser III after his campaign were the Masʾaya. the Taymanites, Sabaean traders established in the Hejaz, the Ḫaipaya, the Badanaya, the Hatiaya, and the Idibaʾilaya.

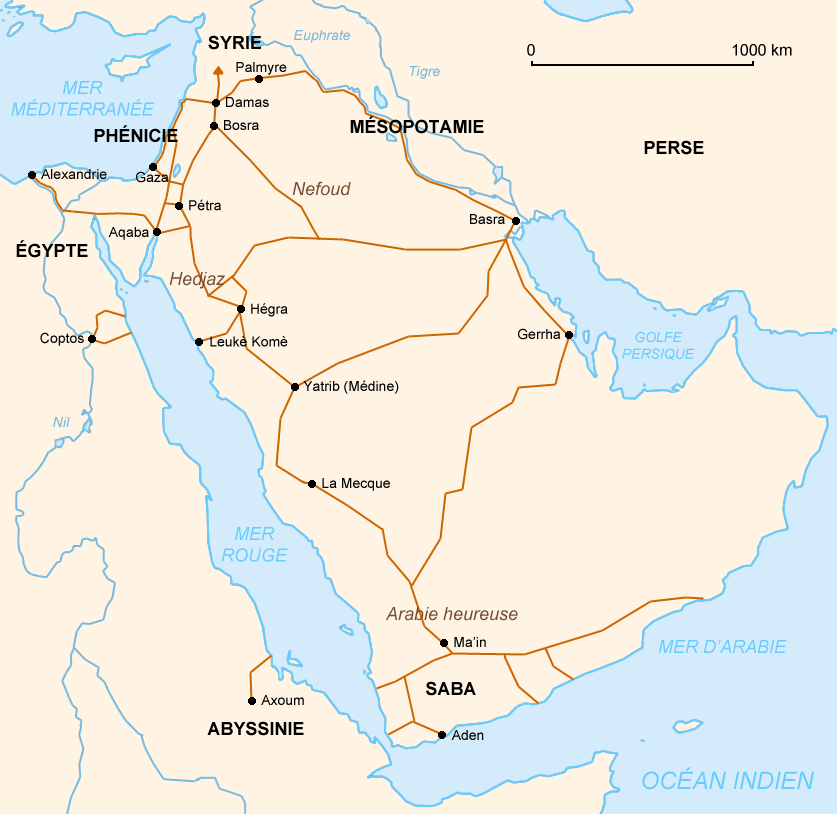
Map of trade routes in Arabia in Antiquity. The Qedarites controlled the northwestern end of these commercial roads.

The Assyrian annexation of the kingdoms of Damascus and later of Israel would allow the Qedarites, to expand into the pastures within the settled areas of these states' former territories, which improved their position in the Arabian commercial activities. The Assyrians would allow these nomad groups to graze their camels in the settled areas and integrate them into their control structure of the border regions of Palestine and Syria, which consisted of a network of sentry stations, check posts and fortresses at key positions, and administrative and governmental centres in the cities, and which would ensure that these Arabs would remain loyal to the Assyrians and would prevent the encroachment of other Arab nomads on the settled areas; thus, several letters to Tiglath-Pileser III by two Assyrian officials stationed in the Levant, respectively named Addu-ḫati and Bēl-liqbi, mention the participation of Arabs in several caravanserais in the region, including the one located at Hisyah; moreover, one Arabian chief from Tiglath-Pileser III's time, named Badiʾilu, was given a grazing permit and appointed as an official of the Assyrian administration as part of this policy. This in turn allowed the Arabs integrated into the Assyrian administration to further expand into the Levantine settled regions around Damascus and the Anti-Lebanon until the Valley of Lebanon.

In 729 BCE, Tiglath-Pileser III proclaimed himself King of Babylon, thus marking the renewal of the importance of southern Mesopotamia and starting the resurgence of Babylon. This revival was itself related to the formation of new commercial links between Babylonia and the Persian Gulf and its surrounding regions, which would eventually lead to Aramaeans as well as Arabs moving into the region.

After the annexation of the kingdom of Israel to the Neo-Assyrian Empire by the Assyrian king Sargon II in c. 720 BCE, the Assyrians transferred some Arabs to the territory of the former kingdom as well as to the southern border regions of Palestine, and some sedentary Qedarites might have been present among the Arabians resettled by the Assyrians as colonists in the hill country around Samaria to perform economic activities as part of the Assyrian diversion of some of the Spice trade to Tyre through Samaria so as to increase both Assyrian control over it and imperial revenue from this commercial traffic. These Arabian settlers introduced the cult of the god Ashima in the region of Samaria.

Due to the revival of Babylonia which had started under Tiglath-Pileser III, nomads had also migrated over the course of the middle 8th century BCE to the east into Babylonia, where they settled down and either founded their own settlements or became the majority population in pre-existing local settlements there. These Arabs appear to have originated from the Wadi Sirhan region, passing through the Jawf depression and along the road near the city of Babylon which went from Yathrib to Borsippa, before finally settling into Bit-Dakkuri and Bit-Amukkani, but not Bit-Yakin or the region of the Persian Gulf; the name of one of these settlements, Qidrina, located in the territory of Bit-Dakkuri, suggests that these newcomers might have been connected with the Qedarites, and the Arabian population in Babylonia remained in close contact with the Qedarites in the desert, who by this time had expanded eastwards so that they adjoined the western border of Babylonia. These Arabians might have been settled in Mesopotamia by the Assyrian kings themselves, especially by Sargon II and his son and successor Sennacherib, and some of these might have in turn been resettled in Media as camel tamers by the Assyrians after they had introduced the use of the dromedary in this region.

In 716 BCE, the Qedarite queen Šamši joined a local Egyptian kinglet of the Nile Delta and the mukarrib Yiṯaʿʾamar Watar I of Sabaʾ in offering lavish presents consisting of gold, precious stones, ivory, willow seeds, aromatics, horses, and camels to the Assyrian king Sargon II to normalise relations with Assyria and to preserve and expand their commercial relations with the economic and structures of the newly established western borderlands of the Neo-Assyrian Empire following the Assyrian annexation of Damascus and Israel. Assyrian records referred to these three rulers as the "kings of the seashore and the desert," reflecting their influence in the trade networks which spanned North Arabia, the Syrian desert, and the northern part of the Sinai.

In the late 8th century BCE, shortly before 700 BCE, the domestication of the camels had made it possible for the Qedarites populations to travel further south the Arabian Peninsula, thus competing with the regional maritime trade routes. During the 7th century BCE, this ability to travel so far to the south led to the establishment of the import of frankincense from the kingdom of Sabaʾ, thus forming the incense trade route, and further increasing the commercial importance of the northern Hejaz and of Palestine and Syria and the adjoining regions. And, under Sargon II, the Arabs within Syria, who may or may not have included Qedarites, were continuing to participate in the caravan traffic in close cooperation with the Assyrian authorities, especially in the area of the Homs plain, which itself extended eastwards towards Palmyra, and where these Arabs were allowed to graze their camels. As part of this collaboration, the Assyrian official Bēl-liqbi, who was stationed in Ṣupite, wrote a letter to Sargon II demanding the permission to transform an old caravanserai which had since become an archers' camp back into a caravanserai. During this period, the Assyrians imposed prohibition on selling iron, which was important for Assyrian armament, to the Arabs to prevent them from developing more efficient weaponry, and instead permitted only copper to be sold to them. Some Arabs, of unclear relation with both those which were then moving into Babylonia and the Qedarites, were at this time also living in Upper Mesopotamia, where they might have been settled by Sargon II and Sennacherib, and where their camels used to graze between Aššur and Ḫindanu, under the authority of the governor of Kalḫu. Due to inadequate rainfall, the governor of Kalḫu lost control of these Upper Mesopotamian Arabs, who in 716 BCE engaged in raids in the regions around Suḫu and Ḫindanu and even further south-east till Sippar, possibly with the support of Assyrian officials.

The increased importance of Babylonia during this period was reflected by several anti-Assyrian revolts in Babylonia led by Marduk-apla-iddina II and supported by Elam, and when he recaptured Babylon and revolted against the Assyrians again in 703 BCE with the support of the Elamites, the Qedarites supported him, with this policy of theirs being motivated by the trade relations which existed between Qedar and Babylon. One of the Arab supporters of Marduk-apla-iddina II, a chieftain by the name of Bašqanu, was captured by the Assyrian king Sennacherib when he suppressed the Babylonian revolt that same year. This Bašqanu was the brother of an Arab queen named Yaṯiʿe, who appears to have been a Qedarite queen and a successor of Šamši; the Qedarites had thus adopted the policy of supporting Assyria's enemy once Syria was firmly under Assyrian control after the previous one and half a century of trying to remain on good terms with the powers governing Syria, including Assyria.

During his repression of the Babylonian revolt in 702 BCE, Sennacherib also attacked several Arab walled towns surrounded by unwalled villages in Babylonia, although it is unclear what relation existed between these Arabs and the Qedarites despite some of these settlements having names including Arabic components which would later be borne by several Qedarite kings, such as Dūr-Uait (from Arabic Yuwaiṯiʿ) and Dūr-Birdada in Bīt-Amukkani, and Dūr-Abiyataʾ (from Arabic Abyaṯiʿ) in Bit-Dakkuri; among the settlements attacked by Sennacherib was Qidrina, in the territory of Bit-Dakkuri, suggesting that these Babylonian Arabs might have been connected with the Qedarites.

Through a series of campaigns conducted from 703 to 700 BCE, Sennacherib was able to establish control over the settled parts of Babylonia, as well as over the nomads of the desert to the immediate west of it, and according to his annals, members of the Taymanites and of the Qedarite sub-group of the Šumuʾilu, the latter of whom lived in the eastern Syrian Desert bordering on Babylonia, went to offer him tribute in the late 690s at the Assyrian capital of Nineveh, where they had to pass through a then recently built gate of the city called the abul madbari (Desert Gate).

Although Sennacherib had regained control of Babylon in 703 BCE, the Babylonians revolted against Assyrian rule with Elamite help yet again in 694 BCE, and the Qedarites supported them again. As part of Sennacherib's repression of this new rebellion, which would end with the destruction of the city of Babylon itself in 689 BCE, in 691 BCE he conducted a campaign against the Qedarites, who by then had grown enough powerful to pose a danger to Assyrian interests. At this time, the Qedarites were ruled by Yaṯiʿe's successor, the priestess-queen Teʾelḫunu and her husband, King Ḫazaʾil, and who was attacked by the Assyrians while encamped in an oasis in the western borderlands of Babylonia; Teʾelḫunu, who had come with the nomads to invade the settled areas attacked by the Qedarites, stayed behind in a camp behind the frontlines to remain out of danger should the Qedarite forces be defeated. Teʾelḫunu and Hazael fled deep into the desert, to the Qedarite capital of Dūmat, where the Assyrians overtook and captured Teʾelḫunu and her daughter Tabūʿa, and took them as hostages to Assyria along with the idols of the Qedarites' gods, and continued pursuing the Qedarites until Kapanu near the eastern border of the Canaanite kingdom of Ammon, following which Hazael surrendered to Sennacherib and paid him tribute. The rich booty captured by the Assyrians at Dūmat included camels as well as luxuries which the Qedarite rulers had acquired from the Arabian trade routes, such as spices, precious stones, and gold.

Teʾelḫunu was taken to the Neo-Assyrian capital of Nineveh in 689 or 698 BC, where Sennacherib raised her daughter Tabūʿa, following the Assyrian practice of controlling vassal populations by raising their rulers at the Assyrian court, while Hazael had retained his position, but as an Assyrian vassal, and he sent Sennacherib continuous tribute until the latter's death. Sennacherib also retained the idols of the Arabian gods as a way to ensure that they would remain loyal to Assyrian power and as a punishment against them in accordance with his heavy-handed policy with respect to Babylonia and its surrounding regions. From this period onwards, the Assyrians would attempt to control the North Arabian populations through vassals, although these vassals would themselves often rebel against the Neo-Assyrian Empire.

When Sennacherib's son Esarhaddon succeeded him in 681 BC, Hazael went to Nineveh to request from him that Tabūʿa and the idols of the Qedarite gods be returned to him. Esarhaddon, after having had his own name as well as "the might of Aššur" inscribed on the idols, acquiesced to Hazael's demand in exchange for an additional tribute of 65 camels, with this light tribute being motivated by Esarhaddon's desire to maintain Hazael's loyalty. This was motivated by Esarhaddon's view that the desert populations were required to maintain control of Babylonia, hence why he adopted the same conciliatory attitude towards the Arabs that he had towards Babylonia itself, and Hazael in consequence ruled over the Qedarites as an Assyrian vassal, and Esarhaddon soon allowed Tabūʿa to return to Dūmat and appointed her as queen of the Qedarites at some point before 678 or 677 BCE.

Around the same time, Hazael died and was succeeded as king by his son Yauṯaʿ with the approval of Esarhaddon, who demanded from him a heavier tribute consisting of 10 minas of gold, 1000 gems, 50 camels, and 1000 spice bags. Yauṯaʿ agreed to these conditions due to his dependence on Assyria and to consolidate his precarious position of rulership.

Hazael and his son Yauṯaʿ might have been seen as Assyrian agents by the Qedarites, and, sometime between 676 and 673 BCE, one Wahb united the Arab tribes in a revolt against Yauṯaʿ. The Assyrians intervened by suppressing Wahb's rebellion, capturing him and his people, and deporting them to Nineveh to be punished as enemies of the king of Assyria.

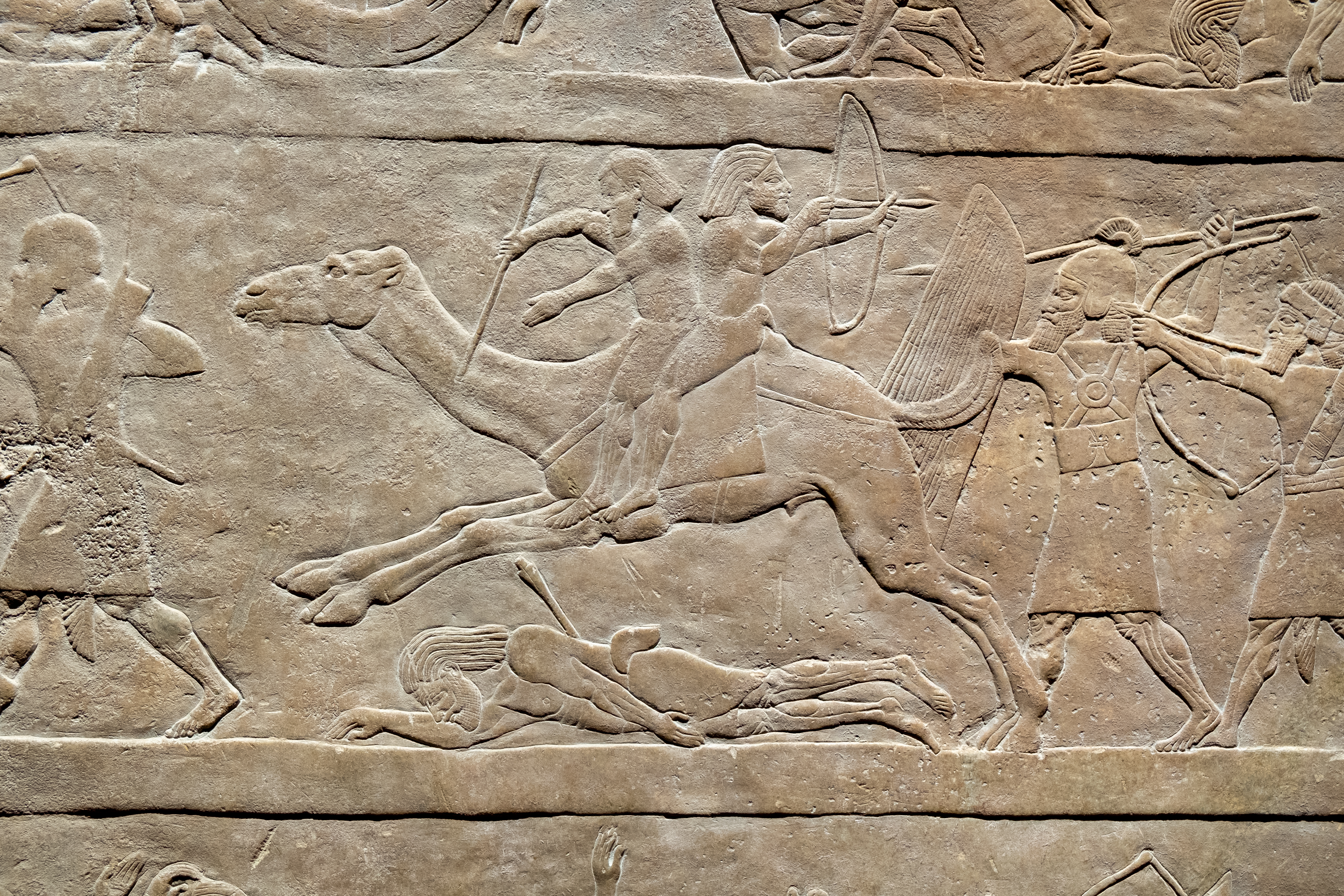
Relief from Ashurbanipal's palace depicting Assyrian soldiers pursuing camel-riding Qedarite Arab warriors.

When the Assyrians invaded Egypt in 671 BCE, Yauṯaʿ was one of the Arab kings summoned by Esarhaddon to provide water supplies to his army during the crossing of the Sinai Desert separating southern Palestine from Egypt. Yauṯaʿ however soon took advantage of Esarhaddon being preoccupied with his operations in Egypt to rebel against Assyria, likely in reaction to the hefty tribute required from him. The Assyrian army intervened against Yauṯaʿ and defeated him, and captured the idols of the Qedarites, including that of their god ʿAttar-Šamē, while Yauṯaʿ himself fled, leaving the Qedarites king-less for the rest of Esarhaddon's rule.

After Esarhaddon died and was succeeded as king of Assyria by his son Ashurbanipal in 669 BCE, Yauṯaʿ returned, and requested from the Assyrian king the return of the idol of ʿAttar-Šamē, which Ashurbanipal granted after Yauṯaʿ swore his allegiance to him.

Yauṯaʿ however soon led the Qedarites and the other Arab peoples into rebelling against the Assyrians, although the Nabataean king Nadnu refused when approached by join the revolt by Yauṯaʿ, who, along with the king ʿAmmu-laddin of another sub-group of Qedarites, attacked the western regions of the Neo-Assyrian Empire in Transjordan and southern Syria, while Yauṯaʿ's wife ʿAṭīya, who had come with the nomads to invade the settled areas attacked by the Qedarites, stayed behind in a camp behind the frontlines to remain out of danger should the Qedarite forces be defeated. The Assyrian troops stationed in the region, from Ṣupite to Edom, and the armies of the local Assyrian vassal kings, especially of Moab, repelled the Arab attacks, with ʿAmmu-laddin being defeated and captured by the Moabite king Kamas-halta. Kamas-halta and the Assyrian army then carried out counter-attacks against the Arab camps, burning down their tents, capturing ʿAmmu-laddin and ʿAṭīya, and taking so many people, donkeys, camels, sheep, and goats, that it caused a drastic drop in the prices of slaves and camels in Assyria. The Qedarites were so severely defeated and Assyrian influence had increased so much in the desert that Yauṯaʿ himself was unable returning to his tribe to resume his rule, and he was instead forced to flee to the territory of the Nabataeans, whose king Nadnu refused to grant him asylum and instead swore allegiance to the Assyrians and handed over Yauṯaʿ to Ashurbanipal, who punished Yauṯaʿ by imprisoning him in a cage.

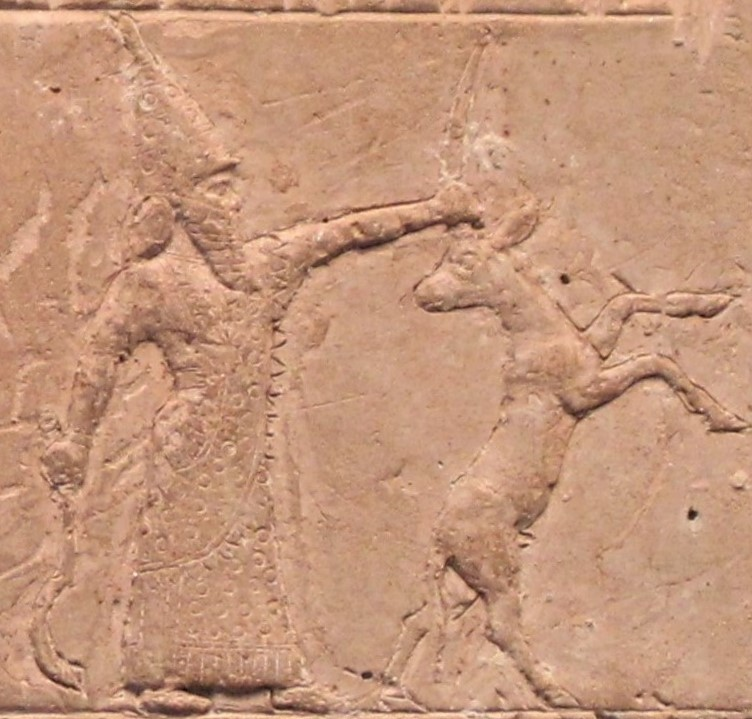
The Neo-Babylonian king Šamaš-šuma-ukin, whose revolt against Assyria was supported by the Qedarites.

One Abyaṯiʿ ben Teʾri, who appears to have been unrelated to Yauṯaʿ, became king of the Qedarites with Assyrian approval after going to Nineveh to swear his allegiance to Ashurbanipal and pledge to pay him tribute.

When Esarhaddon's elder son, Šamaš-šuma-ukin, who had succeeded him as the Neo-Babylonian emperor, rebelled against his brother Ashurbanipal in 652 BCE, Abyaṯiʿ supported the revolt; this Qedarite policy towards the Assyrians was dictated by their interests in the trade routes in the region, which were threatened by Assyrian encroachment. Abyaṯiʿ, along with his brother Ayammu, as well as Yauṯaʿ's cousin, the king Yuwaiṯiʿ ben Birdāda of the Šumuʾilu, led a contingent of Arab warriors to Babylon, where they arrived shortly before Ashurbanipal besieged the city. The Qedarite troops were defeated by the Assyrian army and they retreated into Babylon, where they became trapped once the siege had started. Shortly before the Assyrians stormed Babylon and destroyed the city, the Arabs tried to break out of the city, but they were defeated again by the Assyrians.

While the Arab intervention in Babylonia in support of Šamaš-šuma-ukin was happening, Yauṯaʿ, who was still a prisoner in Assyria, went to Nineveh to attempt to request Ashurbanipal to restore him as king of the Qedarites. Ashurbanipal however saw Yauṯaʿ as incapable of regaining his leadership over the Qedarites and instead punished him for his previous disloyalty.

Following the complete suppression of the Babylonian revolt in 648 BCE, while the Assyrians were busy until 646 BCE conducting operations against the Elamite kings who had supported Šamaš-šuma-ukin, the southern Phoenician cities and the kingdom of Judah seized the opportunity and rebelled against Assyrian authority. Taking advantage of this situation, the Qedarites, led by Abyaṯiʿ, Ayammu, and Yuwaiṯiʿ ben Birdāda, allied with the Nabataeans led by Nadnu, conducted raids against the western borderlands of the Neo-Assyrian Empire ranging from the Jabal al-Bišrī to the environs of the city of Damascus, and were able to intensify their pressure on the areas of the Middle Euphrates and of Palmyrena. The Assyrian general Nabȗ-šum-lišir, who served in the region of the south-west border of Babylonia at the time of Šamaš-šuma-ukin's rebellion, is known to have led an attack against the Qedarites and to have defeated them around this time.

Once the Assyrian war in Elam was complete, in 645 BCE Ashurbanipal attacked the Qedarites and the Nabataeans during a three-months campaign with the goal of subjugating the Arabs permanently. The Assyrian armies first attacked from Ḫadattā, passing through the desert between Laribda, Ḫuraruna and Yarki before reaching Azalla after defeating the joint forces of the Qedarites, Nabataeans, and another tribe, the Isammeʾ, in the region between Yarki and Azalla; the Assyrians then proceeded from Azalla to Quraṣiti, where they attacked Yuwaiṯiʿ ben Birdāda, who fled, captured his mother, sister and family, many prisoners, as well as donkeys, camels, sheep, and goats, and seized the tribe's idols, and dispatched them all through the Damascus road; finally, the Assyrians marched out from Damascus till Ḫulḫuliti, and from there carried out their final attack on the Arabs near the Mount Ḫukkurina (one of the elevations of the al-Lajāʾ), where they captured Abyaṯiʿ and Ayammu, the latter of whom was flayed alive. Due to the Assyrian campaign, the Šumuʾilu rebelled against Yuwaiṯiʿ ben Birdāda and handed him over to the Assyrians. After the victory over the Qedarites, the Assyrians campaigned against the Nabataeans.

=== Neo-Babylonian period ===
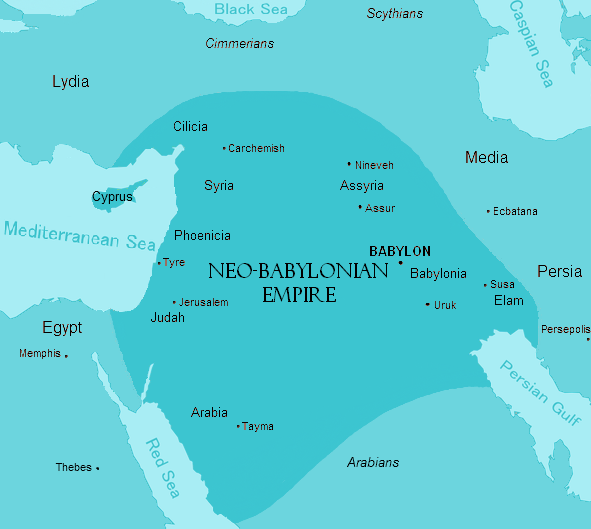
The Neo-Babylonian Empire at its maximum extent after Nabonidus's campaigns in Arabia.

After Ashurbanipal's death, the Babylonians led by Nabopolassar and the Medes led by Cyaxares rebelled against Assyrian rule again, this time culminating in their destruction of the Neo-Assyrian Empire over the course of 614 to 609 BC. This transitional period saw a resurgent Egypt trying to preserve the Neo-Assyrian Empire and establish its rule on the Levant only for the newly established Neo-Babylonian Empire to gain the upper hand and seize all of Syria and Palestine when Nabopolassar's son and successor Nebuchadnezzar II defeated the Egyptians at Carchemish in 605 BCE. It is unknown what was the role of the Arab populations during these events, although the Qedarites appear to not have pressed against the Transjordanian region during the period which oversaw the collapse of the Neo-Assyrian Empire and its replacement by the Neo-Babylonian Empire, and the Canaanite kingdoms of Palestine were strong enough to resist the Arabs once the region had come under Babylonian hegemony.

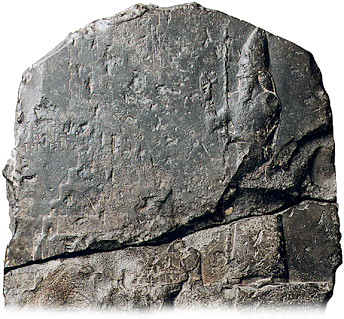
The Neo-Babylonian king Nebuchadnezzar II.

From Judah, King Jehoiakim was initially an ally of the Egyptians until the Babylonian triumph of 605 BCE forced him to change his alignment and become a Babylonian vassal. After the attempt by Nabopolassar's son and successor, Nebuchadnezzar II, to invade Egypt itself failed in 601 BCE, the Babylonian control over Syria became weaker, and Nebuchadnezzar II had to reorganise his army in Babylon and could not carry out military activities, allowing Jehoiakim to rebel against Babylonian rule and to realign himself with Egypt, thus allowing the Transjordanian Canaanite kingdoms of Ammon, Edom, Judah and Moab, as well as the Qedarites, to ally with Egypt while leaving the Babylonian provinces of central and southern Syria which directly depended on the Babylonian military vulnerable to attacks from the Arabs, including the Qedarites.

Nebuchadnezzar II responded by personally returning to Syria in 599 BCE, establishing his base possibly in Damascus, and conducting raids over the course of 599 to 598 BCE against the Qedarites from his Syrian provinces with the aim of pacifying the desert, and culminating in the Babylonians capturing the idols of the Qedarites' gods, thus placing them under Babylonian overlordship. This led to Ammon and Moab defecting to the Babylonian side and joining Babylonian subjects in Damascus in attacking Judah. In 597 BCE, Nebuchadnezzar II himself attacked Judah, captured its king, the son and successor of Jehoiakim, Jeconiah, and turned it into a Babylonian vassal.

Following a domestic revolt in Babylon in 594 BCE, the new king of Judah, Zedekiah, organised an anti-Babylonian meeting supported by Egypt in Jerusalem in which Ammon, Edom, Moab, Sidon and Tyre participated, and to which the Qedarites were also aligned. Since the Babylonians had important interests in the trade from South Arabia which passed through the Hejaz and the Negev, once Nebuchadnezzar II managed to repress the revolt in Babylon, in 587 BCE he attacked and annexed Judah and one year later started the siege of Tyre as part of operations meant to neutralise and control the various Canaanite states which had participated in these anti-Babylonian activities, thus bringing an end to this latest anti-Babylonian endeavour. With the solidification of Babylonian control in Palestine, Edom, which at this time controlled North Arabian territory until as far south as the oasis of Dadān, became a centre of Babylonian influence in Arabia. After Nebuchadnezzar II annexed the Canaanite kingdoms of Judah in 587 BCE and of Ammon and Moab in 582 BCE, the resulting power vacuum in Transjordan allowed the Arabs of the Syrian desert, including the Qedarites and the Nabataeans, to expand into these former states' settled territories close to the desert, including across southern Transjordan and Palestine until the Judaean hills, where they remained throughout the existence of the Neo-Babylonian Empire and cohabited with the sedentary Ammonite, Moabite, and Edomite populations, with whom these Arab incomers mingled over several generations.

In the spring of 553 BCE, the Babylonian king Nabonidus went to Syria, from where he campaigned against Edom, captured its capital, and then marched to Taymāʾ, Dadān (whose king was defeated by Nabonidus), Fadak, Ḫaybar, Yadiʿ, and Yaṯrib. The Qedarites initially supported the Dadānites against Nabonidus, but the Babylonians soon defeated the Qedarites and reimposed Babylonian rule over them. With Edom destroyed by the Babylonians, the Arab populations, including the Qedarites, filled the power vacuum left in the northern Hejaz.

=== Achaemenid period ===
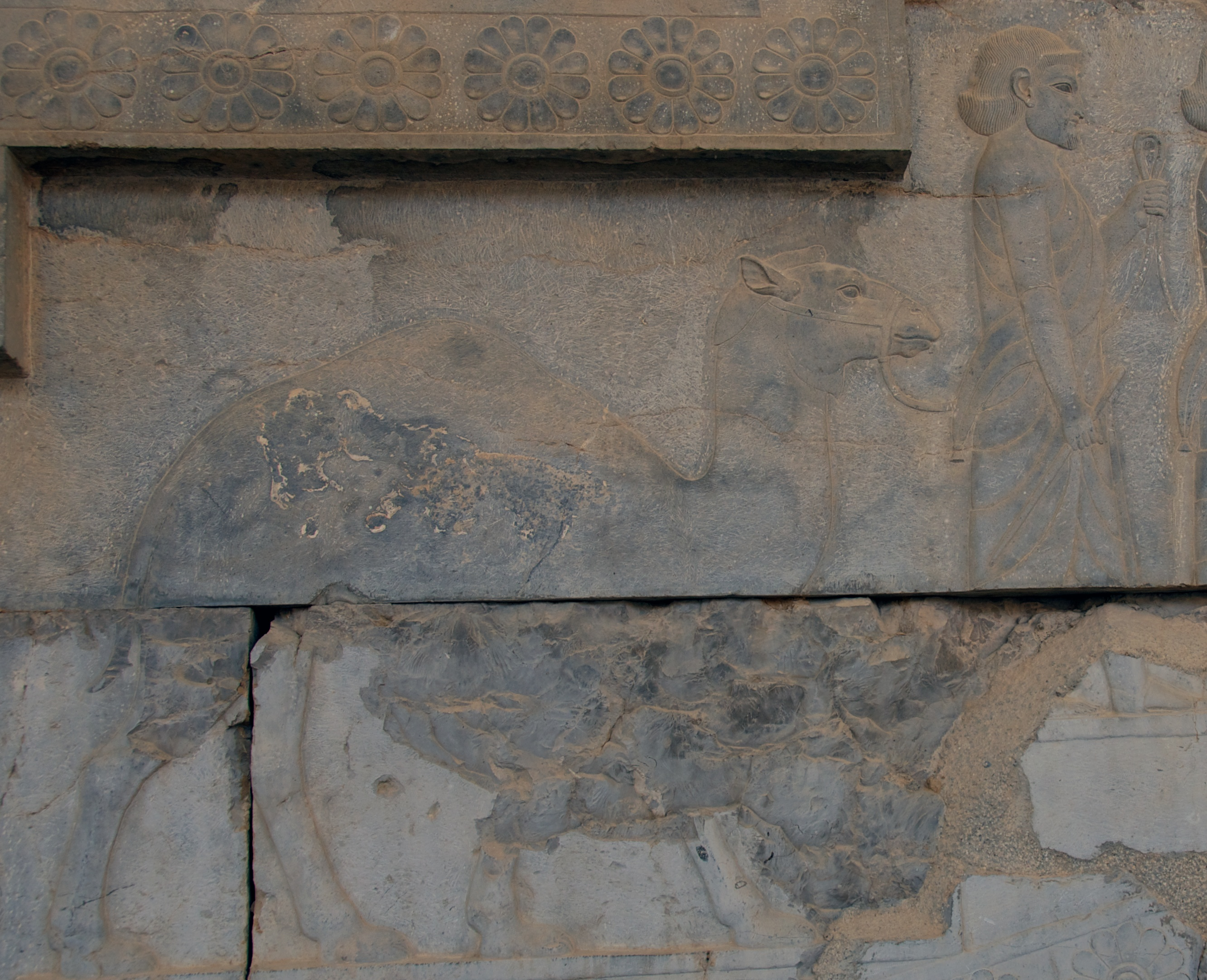
Relief from the Apadana of Persepolis depicting an Arab bringing a camel as tribute.

When Cyrus the Great conquered the Neo-Babylonian Empire in 539 BCE, the Arab populations of the Syrian desert and of North Arabia, including the Qedarites, as well as the desert routes going into Mesopotamia from these regions, became part of his Persian Achaemenid Empire. The Qedarites and the Nabataeans formed the major Arab groups within Achaemenid Syria, and the Qedarites took advantage of the creation of a further power vacuum in the Hijaz following the end of the Neo-Babylonian Empire to dominate the northern Hejaz.

After the Qedarites provided Cyrus II's successor Cambyses II with water in the Sinai Desert during his preparations for conquering Egypt, the Achaemenid kings granted the Qedarite king a coastal emporium exempt from taxes ranging from Gaza to Ienysus, within the fifth satrapy inhabited by the Phoenicians which went from the eastern border of Cilicia till Gaza and continuing from Ienysos till Lake Serbonis. This emporium allowed the Qedarites to reduce the costs of transporting spices by redirecting the spice trade towards Gaza, where the Qedarite involvement in the spice trade ended once the goods reached the coasts and were shipped out, rather than towards more distant Tyre, which in turn also permitted the Qedarite kings who surpervised the spice trade to sell their products to Phoenician as well as Greek traders. An important economic reason why this coastal emporium had been granted to the Qedarite kings was so they, rather than the imperial authorities would be allowed to collect customs duties on the trade of spices, aromatics and other luxuries, such as frankincense, myrrh, cassia, cinnamon, and gum mastic, passing through Transjordan and ʾAylat till Gaza, in return of which the Qedarites had to provide the Achaemenid authorities with annual payments of 1000 talents (30 tons) of frankincense; this situation suggests that the Qedarites enjoyed very good relations with the Persian Achaemenid authorities. At this time, the territory of the Qedarites in the east might perhaps become reduced so that it no longer bordered on Babylonia and maybe no longer controlled even the areas of the middle Euphrates region or the desert regions leading from Syria the middle Euphrates.

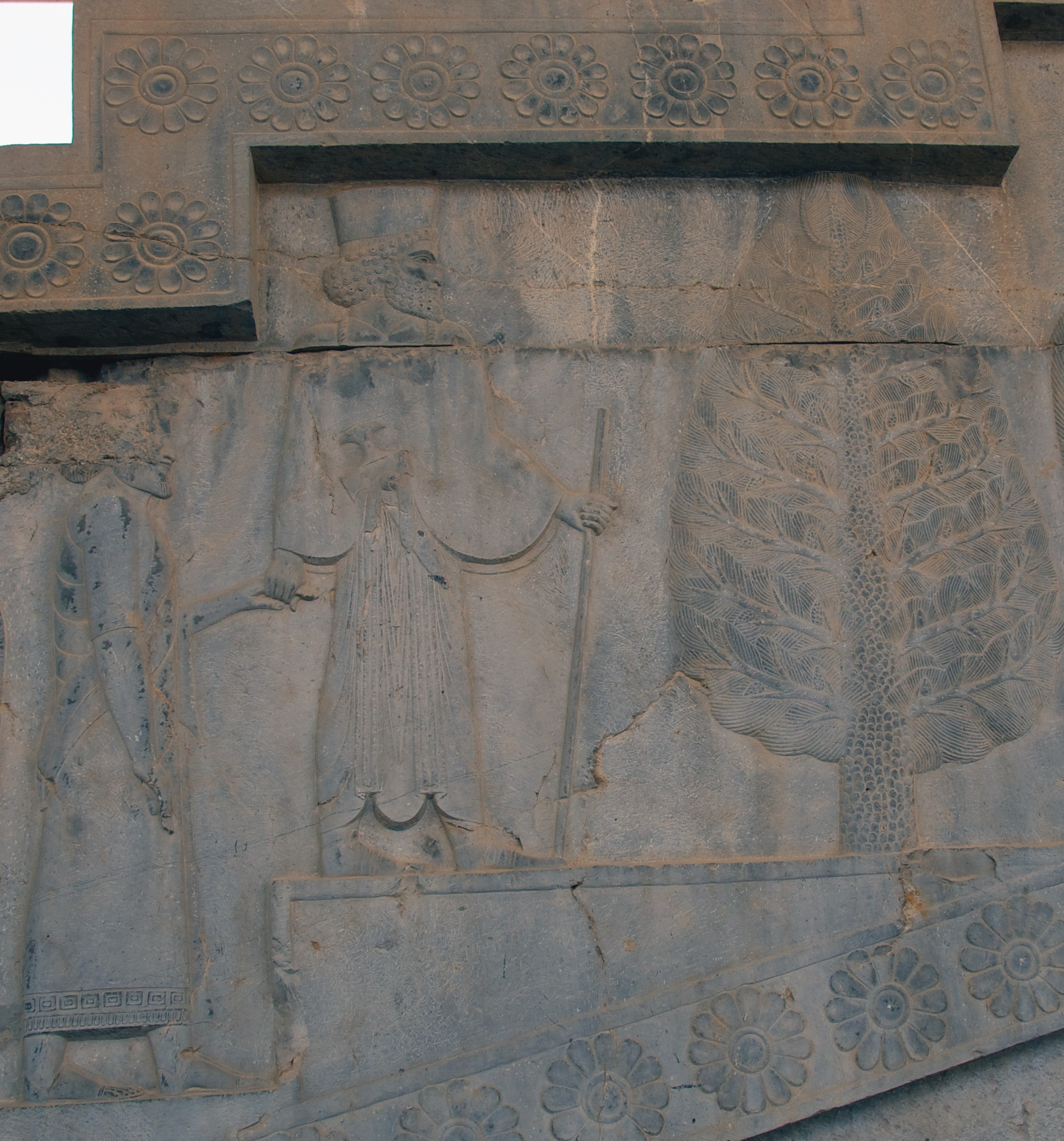
Relief from the Apadana of Persepolis depicting an Arab tribute-bearer being led by a Persian official.

The various Arab populations of the Achaemenid Empire appear to not have rebelled during the period of political turmoil following the death of Cambyses II, and some of them appear to have even offered their services as camel-mounted warriors to the new king Darius I when he crossed the Tigris river to repress the revolt of Babylon; some of Arab camelry contingents might also have helped him cross the Isthmus of Suez during his repression of the revolt of Egypt. After Darius I reorganised the empire into several provinces called satrapies, the kingdom of the Qedarites became part of the satrapy of Arabāya, which was itself closely associated with the Assyrian, Babylonian and Egyptian satrapies in Achaemenid inscriptions.

In the mid-5th century BCE, the Qedarites were ruled by the king Gešem ben Šahr, who enjoyed a prominent status within the Achaemenid administration and controlled the region to the south of Judaea in his role as an imperial official in Dadān, which is attested in the form of a Dadanitic inscription in which he is mentioned alongside the governor of Dadān, reading 𐪈𐪑𐪚𐪃 𐪔𐪆𐪃 𐪈𐪌 𐪆𐪀𐪇 𐪅𐪒𐪑𐪕 𐪐𐪂𐪉 𐪕𐪕𐪌 (bʾym Gšm bn Šhr wʿbd fḥt Ddn, lit. 'in the time of Gešem ben Šahr and ʿbd the governor of Dadān'; the title fḥt, lit. 'governor' is unattested in Arabian languages and is a loanword from Akkadian bel pīḫati, thus implying that the region was under Achaemenid rule), being evidence that Gešem was not the governor of Dadān but nevertheless held an important position as the oasis. Like the earlier Qedarite rulers, Gešem had important interests in the trade passing through North Arabia into southern Palestine, and his fear of a resurgence of Judah led him to oppose Nehemiah in 445 BCE after the latter rebuilt the walls of Jerusalem.

The Achaemenid Empire encouraged the growth of Qedarite power, and with imperial approval under the reigns of the kings Darius I and his son and successor Xerxes I, the Qedarites and the Nabataeans soon expanded their territory during the 5th century BCE to the west into the southern and eastern Levant, which put the Qedarites in control of the Negev and the northern Sinai till they were adjoining the eastern borders of Lower Egypt and southern Palestine, more specifically in the region to the immediate south of Judaea and east of the Nile Delta, and the approach of the Wadi Tumilat, where the Qedarites acted as a garrison which protected the local border for the Achaemenids and as a sort of police force in Egypt by helping the imperial authorities prevent any further revolt of Egypt; at the same time, the Qedarites protected the Canal of the Pharaohs dug by Darius I as well as the road between Syria and Egypt, while the border town of Daphnae acted as a garrison against the Arabs and the populations of Syria. Within Lower Egypt itself, the Qedarites expanded into its 20th nome of Lower Egypt until as far as the Wādī Ṭumīlāt's western end at Bubastis and northwards along the Pelusian branch of the Nile till the ruins of Pi-Ramesses, with their new Egyptian territories including fine agricultural land between what are presently Saft el-Hinna and Qantir, and grazing land in the Wādī Ṭumīlāt itself. As a result of this Qedarite expansion, the region to the east of the Pelusian branch of the Nile became known as Ἀραβίη (Arabíē, lit. 'Arabia'), the mountainous areas to the east of Heliopolis as the Ἀραβίης ὄρος (Arabíēs óros, lit. 'Arabian Mountains'), and the Gulf of Suez as the Ἀράβιος κόλπος (Arábios kólpos, lit. 'Arabian Gulf'); the Qedarite kingdom at this time thus covered an area ranging from the eastern limits of the Nile Delta in the west till Transjordan in the east and including the whole Sinai peninsula and the northern Hejaz, and their western expansion allowed them to control a large territory stretching from the Egyptian city of Pithom (presently Tall al-Masḫuṭa) in the eastern Nile Delta through the Negev till Transjordan.

The Qedarite expansion also pressured many Edomites out of their traditional homelands, forcing them to resettle as Qedarite vassals into the southern parts of the former kingdom of Judah which became known as Idumaea, although the bulk of the population of the former territories of Edom as well as of the newly formed Idumaea appears to have consisted of both Edomites and Qedarites, as well as a Jewish minority in the region of Beersheba.

This expansion placed the Qedarites at the head of the important trade network which existed between Gaza on the Mediterranean Sea and Eilat on the Red Sea, as well as in control of the northern end of both the marine and overland branches of commercial traffic of the incense trade route which flowed from South Arabia to Gaza, with Gaza itself being under Qedarite rule; attesting of this important role of the Qedarites in the Arabian trade is an inscription from the South Arabian kingdom of Maʿin, reading 𐩲𐩧𐩨𐩺𐩩 𐩨𐩬 𐩤𐩵𐩧 (ʿrbyt bn qdr, lit. 'an Arabian woman from Qedar'); the resulting control of the frankincense trade by the Qedarite kings further augmented their political and political power, and the expanded influence of the Qedarites in Egypt is reflected in the construction of a shrine to al-Lat, who was the main goddess of the Qedarites, in Pithom, which was itself located on the principal road between the Gulf of Suez and the Nile Delta. Thanks to these favourable developments Qedar became a powerful political force in Egypt as well as the whole eastern Mediterranean, able to mint its own coins at Gaza.

Thanks to the Achaemenid Empire's multinational structure and its policy of tolerance and the end of any independent polities in the Southern Levant, these Arabian groups became integrated into the Persian Empire's economic, administrative, and military systems, with this process also being driven by the development of trade in Arabia as well as the military activities of the Achaemenid kings due to which warriors from all the populations ruled by their empire, including those from the Arab peoples, required their enrollment into the Achaemenid army. Thus, in 480 BCE, camel-riding Arab units participated in the Achaemenid king Xerxes I's invasion of Greece, under the command of Arsames, son of Darius, along with the Nubian units of the Achaemenid army.

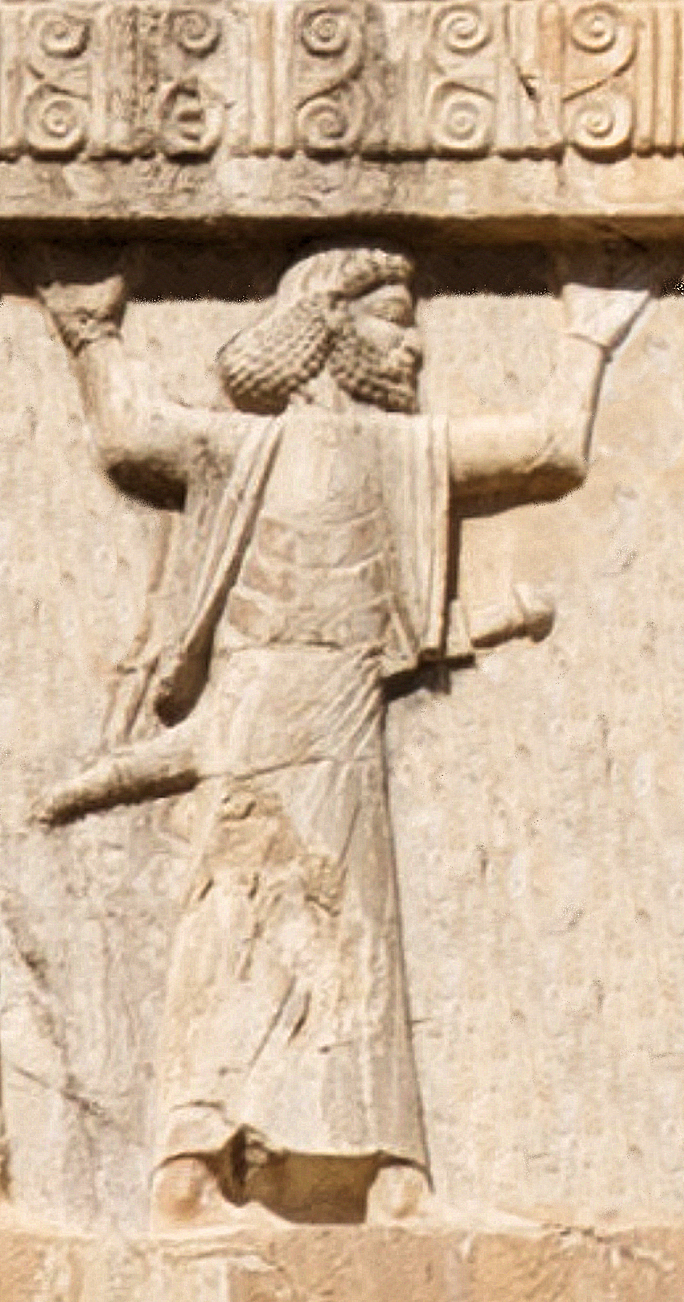
Relief of an Arab warrior from the tomb of the Achaemenid king Xerxes I.

"Gešem the Arabian" an adversary of Nehemiah, was succeeded by his son Qainū, who is known to have offered a silver bowl in dedication to a shrine of the goddess al-ʾIlāt at Pithom; the silver bowl had an Aramaic inscription on it, reading 𐡆𐡉 𐡒𐡉𐡍𐡅 𐡁𐡓 𐡂𐡔𐡌𐡅 𐡌𐡋𐡊 𐡒𐡃𐡓 𐡒𐡓𐡁 𐡋𐡄𐡍𐡀𐡋𐡕 (zy Qynw br Gšmw mlk Qdr qrb l-hnʾlt, lit. 'that which Qainū son of Gešem, king of Qedar, brought-in-offering to han-ʾIlat', with han-ʾIlat being the Aramaic form of the goddess's Arabic name of al-ʾIlāt).

Achaemenid rule over the Transjordan lasted until Egypt under Amyrtaeus rebelled against Persian rule over the course of 411 to 404 BCE and embarked on anti-Persian activities in Palestine, Phoenicia and Cyprus, at the same time that Evagoras I in the latter location rebelled against the Persian Empire, which was itself facing a number of internal crises which greatly weakened it. In this situation, Persian rule broke down in Transjordan, which became independent, although Arab units of the imperial army nevertheless participated in the empire's overseas and coastal military activities in 410 and 386 BCE when the Achaemenid Empire became involved in the latter phases of the Peloponnesian War on the side of Sparta. The Qedarites appear to have enjoyed good relations with the rebel kings who ruled during the brief period of Egyptian independence from Persian rule which lasted from 404 to 343 BCE, and during this time the Qedarite territory expanded westwards beyond Ienysos till it adjoined Pelusium.

These circumstances saw the formation of an alliance of sorts between the enemies of the Achaemenid Empire and of its Spartan ally, consisting of Athens, Evagoras I's kingdom in Cyprus, Egypt, and Qedar. This new coalition itself came to an end after Sparta, supported by the Persians, ended the Peloponnesian War by defeating Athens only to support the rebellion of 401 BCE by Cyrus the Younger against his brother the Achaemenid king Artaxerxes II with the hope of extending its control over Ionia; once Cyrus' rebellion had failed, the Athenians and Evagoras I became the supporters of the Achaemenids against Sparta. This new alliance also fell apart once Sparta was defeated in 394 BCE, following which all the Greek cities, including Athens, made peace with the Persian Empire in 386 BCE. The role of the Qedarites in these subsequent developments is however unknown.

The Qedarite involvement in these developments itself happened in the backdrop of new changes within South Arabia, where the dominance of the kingdom of Saba over the incense trade route came to an end and was replaced by that of the states of Ma'in and Qataban, and in the Hejaz, with the oasis of Taymāʾ starting to decline while the dominance of Aramaeans there came to an end, the Lihyan dynasty or tribe taking control of Dadān, and Minaeans from South Arabia set up a colony in Dadān in collaboration with the Dadanites. At the same time, in South

Later, after the Egyptian king Teos was overthrown by Nectanebo II in 358 BCE, he passed through the territory of the Qedarites to flee to the court of Artaxerxes II.

After the Achaemenid Artaxerxes III's reconquest of Egypt in 343 BCE, he placed Phoenicia and Arabia under the authority of a single satrap, removed Gaza from their territories and made it part of the Achaemenid province of Palestine and Phoenicia, and might possibly have abolished the political independence of Qedar itself.

=== Hellenistic period ===
By the time of the Macedonian conquest of the Achaemenid Empire by Alexander the Great, the Qedarites assisted the Persian garrison stationed at Gaza in resisting the Ancient Macedonians when they laid siege of the city in 332 BCE with the goal establishing control over the frankincense trade. Once Alexander had captured Gaza, he proceeded to send 500 talents of frankincense and 100 talents of myrrh captured as booty to his teacher, Leonidas of Epirus, and the success of his campaign placed the western part of the Qedarite kingdom which laid on the southern Levantine coast until the eastern borders of Egypt under Macedonian authority, with Alexander III appointing Cleomenes of Naucratis to be its governor at Hērōōnpolis (as Pithom was then known), while its parts in the Sinai Peninsula and the northern Hejaz remained independent.

Once Alexander III had completed his conquest of the Persian Empire and returned to Babylon in 323 BCE, he started making preparations for a campaign in South Arabia, which he believed laid on the southern shores and islands of the Persian Gulf, and which were prosperous and produced cassia, myrrh, frankincense, cinnamon, and spikenard, but also because the Arabs were the only people of the world known to the ancient Greeks who had refused to send him any delegation. The Qedarites remained independent during the time of the Hellenistic states established by the Diadokhoi after the death of Alexander III, and uring the post-Achaemenid period, the whole of the area to the east of the Nile Delta became included in the Qedarite-inhabited territory named "Arabia." Their Nabataean neighbours at this time lived to the south of the Arnon river.

During the Wars of the Diadokhoi, Antigonus I in 312 BCE sent his general Athenaios to attack the Qedarites and establish control over the frankincense trade, which he initially successfully accomplished by proceeding from Idumaea, capturing a position called "the Rock" on the boundary between former the states of Edom and Judah in the Negev settled by the Qedarites, at the site of present-day Avdat, and returning with a booty of frankincense, myrrh and 500 talents of silver, before most of his army was killed by a counter-attack by Qedarite warriors equipped with javelins. After the failure of Athenaios's expedition, the Qedarites wrote a letter in Aramaic to Antigonus I, which was followed by a period of peace between him and Qedar until he sent his son, Demetrius I of Macedon, the same year on another military expedition against the Qedarites, who were able to successfully defend themselves, due to which both sides signed a treaty according to which Demetrius received hostages and retired back to his father's realm.

After the return of Demetrius, Antigonus I attempted to start exploiting the asphalt found in the Dead Sea, and he placed Hieronymus of Cardia in charge of these operations. However, Qedarite archers sailing on rafts killed most of the men assigned to this task under Hieronymos, and Antigonus I thereafter abandoned his interests in Arabia.

When Antigonus I tried to conquer Egypt again in 306 BCE, the Qedarites provided him with assistance due to the treaty they had signed with Demetrius, but the Diadokhos Ptolemy I Soter, who had proclaimed himself king of Egypt, managed to defeat Antigonus and his Qedarite allies, thus forcing him to retreat to Syria again while Ptolemy I was able to assure his control over Egypt.

After Antigonus I died in battle at Ipsus in 301 BCE, Ptolemy I consolidated his rule over Egypt and southern Syria, including the southern coast of the Levant, the road from Egypt to Palestine, and Transjordan, and in consequence the Qedarites reconciled with Ptolemy I's newly established Ptolemaic Kingdom of Egypt. During this period, part of the Nabataeans were living in Hauran, either as vassals or as allies of the new Hellenistic kingdom of Egypt.

Beginning in the time of Ptolemy I's son, Ptolemy II Philadelphus, an overseer was attested as having appointed by the Ptolemaic kingdom over the frankincense trade in Gaza, and in the late 3rd century BCE a trade route was established which started at Heroonpolis near the "Arabian Gulf" and passed through the territories once belonging to the former kingdom of Edom in the Negev and through northern Arabia, more specifically across Transjordan to the south of Auranitis and then into the southern Syrian Desert, till Havilah near Dūmat, and from there went northeastwards to Euphrates, following the river till Teredon on the Persian Gulf, where it joined a trade route starting in Ḥaḍramawt and passing through Gerrha. By around c. 259 BC, the Qedarite territory in eastern Egypt had been made into a nome of the Ptolemaic kingdom, with its capital being Patoumos, and during the reign of Ptolemy II, Qedarites started being hired in Egypt as guards or a police force organised in units of ten members, as well as border troops to protect the Ptolemaic provinces in the Southern Levant against the nearby Hellenistic kingdom of the Seleucids.

When the Seleucid Antiochus III attacked the southern Syrian provinces of the Ptolemaic kingdom in 218 BCE, he sought friendly relations with the Arabs of the Syrian Desert, after which the Qedarites ended their allegiance to the Egyptian kingdom and rallied to him, as a result of which Ptolemaic forces stationed at Rabbat ʿAmmān started attacking the Qedarite territories of Transjordan. Antiochus III was however defeated by the Egyptian forces at Rafah in 217 BCE, and in consequence he lost his newly acquired territories in Phoenicia and Palestine.

When the Maccabean Revolt broke out against the Seleucid king Antiochus IV, the pro-Seleucid Qedarites in Transjordan refused to provide refuge to the deposed Jason, the deposed High Priest of the Temple of Jerusalem, who was an opponent of Antiochus IV. When Judas Maccabeus attacked the Seleucid general Timothy of Ammon in Transjordan, the latter's army he used to counter-attack included several Qedarite members, and, following the Seleucid Demetrius I's capture of Jerusalem, the Qedarites opposed the rebellion led by Judas' brothers, Jonathan Apphus, John Gaddi, and Simon Thassi, and killed John, in retaliation of which Jonathan and Simon attacked the Qedarites and killed many of them.

The rise of the Parthian Empire in the late 2nd century BCE led to significant changes in Arabia, with the Parthians diverting part of the trade going from Gerrha to Dumat and Egypt northwards to another commercial road going from the Persian Gulf into Mesopotamia. At the same time, the Hellenistic sailors were able to establish a direct maritime trade route from Egypt to South Asia, allowing them to bypass the overland trade routes controlled by the various Arabian states, due to which frankincense started being exported by sea, thus causing the decline of the traditional incense trade route which had so far provided the Qedarites with wealth.

According to Artapanus of Alexandria and an inscription dated to 129 BCE from Priēnē in Asia Minor, the Qedarite kingdom still existed and controlled the Negev and the Sinai in the 2nd century BCE, although the Nabataeans appear to have expanded into Transjordan by 160 BCE.

After the Jewish king, Alexander Jannaeus, joined the civil war in Egypt opposing the queen Cleopatra III to her son Ptolemy IX on the side of Cleopatra III, Alexander Jannaeus embarked on a campaign in Transjordan during which he was defeated, after which he made an alliance with the Qedarites in Transjordan and the Negev. In response to the formation of this alliance, the Seleucid king Antiochus XII started a series of campaigns against the Qedarites, first in Transjordan, and later in the Negev, where he fell in battle in 82 BCE. After the death of Antiochus XII, the inhabitants of Damascus called upon one Aretas, who ruled over both the Qedarites and the Nabataeans in a personal union, to take over the city. During the period of the 1st century BCE, the Hellenistic period in West Asia ended and was replaced by Roman rule after the Roman general Gnaeus Pompeius Magnus annexed Syria into the Roman Republic over the course of 65 to 62 BCE, at the end of which he attacked Petra.

When the Parthians attacked Jerusalem in 40 BCE, the Judaean king Herod the Great, who was of Matrilineal Nabatean descent, fled to his relatives at the Qedarite centre of "the rock" in the Negev, from where he fled to Egypt after the king Malichus I refused to grant him refuge.

=== Roman period ===
Following the rise and fall of Alexander Jannaeus, the invasion of Syria by Tigranes the Great, and the arrival of the Romans in West Asia, the Qedarites left their traditional centre at the Rock in the Negev and moved to the Rock in the territories formerly belonging to the Iron Age kingdom of Edom, where were already settled the Nabataeans, with whom the Qedarites had long enjoyed close relations, thus forming a joint Qedarite-Nabataean kingdom.

During the war opposing the last Ptolemaic ruler, the queen Cleopatra VII, to the Roman dictator Gaius Octavius, the Qedarites supported Cleopatra VII, and, after her defeat in 30 BC, they burnt her fleet in the Red Sea.

The Qedarites were soon absorbed by the Nabataeans.

=== Legacy ===
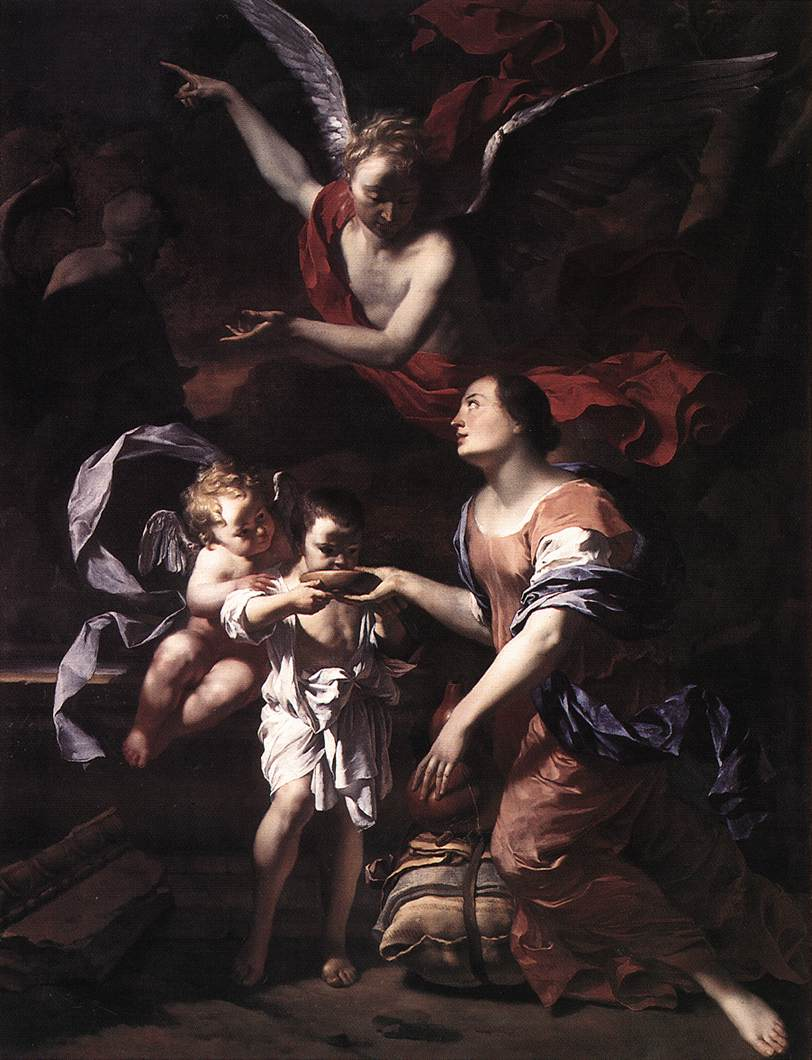
Hagar and Ishmael in the Wilderness, painting by Karel Dujardin

The practice of local empires using Arab nomads to guard their borders, which started with the Assyrians integrating the Arabs of the Syrian Desert into the control system of their Syrian and Palestinian borders, would continue throughout Antiquity and the Middle Ages, with the later Byzantine Empire assigning the role of guarding their Syrian and North Arabian borders to the Ghassanid Arabs, up till the modern period, when the Ottoman Empire placed similar responsibilities of guarding their southern Syrian and Transjordanian borders on the local Bedouin tribes.

==== Graeco-Roman ====
Due to increased contacts between Greece and Arabia over the course of the 4th century BC, the First Delphic Hymn to the Greek god Apollo mentions Άραψ ατμός (Áraps atmós, lit. 'Arab smoke') which is spread towards Olympus, as a reference to the use in Apollo's cult of frankincense which was imported through Qedarite Arabia.

===== Mythological =====
Goshen

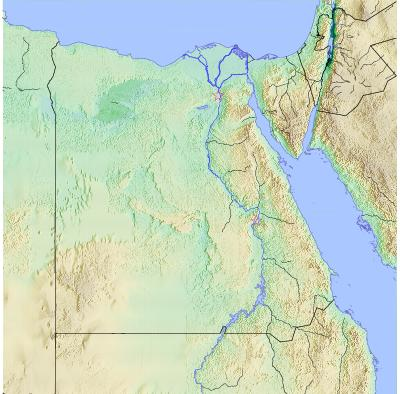

sSr z m t niwt
Gsm
in hieroglyphs
Era: Late Period
(664–332 BC)

The ancient Greek historian Herodotus of Halicarnassus, repeating local folk tales, claimed that the part of the Qedarite kingdom located between the Nile Delta and the Negev desert was inhabited by "winged snakes" which would migrate into Egypt proper during each spring, where they would be killed by ibis birds, due to which the Egyptians allegedly considered it a sacred bird. According to Herodotus, the mythical phoenix bird also lived in this part of the Qedarite kingdom, from where it would bring its father's remains to the temple of Ra in the Egyptian city of Heliopolis every 500 years.

==== Biblical ====
The Qedarites appear in the Hebrew Bible as a tribe descended from קֵדָ֥ר (Qēḏār), the second son of Ishmael, himself the son of Abraham and Hagar, In the Bible, Ishmael's eldest son נְבָיוֹת (Nebaioth) is given prominence due to the rule of primogeniture, with Qedar also being given some level of prominence due to being the second-born son, making him the closest of Ishmael's sons to the one standing for primogeniture.

The name Qēḏār is often used in the Hebrew Bible to refer to Arabia and Arabs in general, and in a Biblical prophecy, the Juhadite prophet Jeremiah used the names of Kittim (Cyprus) and Qēḏār to refer, respectively, to the western and eastern cardinal points.

The Qedarite capital of Dūmat also appears in the Hebrew Bible, where its population is represented by the sixth son of Ishmael, Dumah, and his descendants. The descendants of Dumah have been identified with the Qedarite centre of Dūmat.

===== The Land of Goshen =====
According to some scholars, parts of Gešem's kingdom of "Arabia" located to the east of the Nile Delta and around Pithom became known to ancient Egyptians as 𓎤𓊃𓅓𓏏𓊖 (Gsm) and to Jews as the Land of Goshen (אֶרֶץ גֹּשֶׁן ʾEreṣ Gōšen) after either Gešem himself or after his dynasty; according to the Book of Genesis, when the sons of Jacob migrated to Egypt, they settled down in the Land of Goshen.

This etymology of Goshen with Gešem is problematic. Egyptian sources begin referring to the 20th nome of Egypt as Gsm during the Twenty-sixth dynasty of Egypt, more than a century before the lifetime of Gešem ben Šahr. John Van Seters opposed the identification of Goshen with the Qedarite territories in eastern Egypt based on claims that the Qedarites never ruled the region of the Wadi Tumilat; however, Qedarite remains, such as a shrine to the goddess al-Lāt, have been discovered in the region. Sarah I. Groll, Manfred Bietak, and Mark Janzen reject any connection between the Land of Goshen and the territories of the Qedarite king Gešem, proposing instead that the biblical placename is related to the lake gsm mentioned in the Papyrus Anastasi IV, dated to the 13th century BCE. In their view, the biblical land should be identified with the western part of the Wadi Tumilat with its large overflow lake.

==== Islamic ====
The tradition of Ishmaelite ancestry already existed among pre-Islamic Arabs. According to Islamic tradition, Ishmael is the eponymous ancestor of some groups of northwestern Arabs, prominently through his two eldest sons, including (1) نابت (Nābit) or نبيت (Nabīt), corresponding to the Biblical Nebaioth, and (2) قيدر (Qaydar) or قيدار (Qaydār), corresponding to the Biblical Qedar, who lived in eastern Transjordan, Sinai and the Hejaz, and whose descendant tribes were the most prominent ones among the twelve tribes of the Ishmaelites. This tradition also held that Muhammad descended from Ishmael through either Nābit or Qaydār depending on the scholar.

According to Irfan Shahîd, historians view genealogical Ishmaelism with skepticism due to confusion in the Islamic period which led to Ismail being considered as the ancestor of all Arabian tribes. According to Shahîd, genealogical descent from Ishmael is viewed with skepticism by some historians, insofar as it has been extended to implausibly include all Arabs, both in the north and south, although some more modest traditions may apply it only to some Arab tribes.

== Culture and society ==
Qedarite society consisted of both nomads and sedentary villagers who primarily reared sheep, goats, and camels. The settled Qedarites living in the confederation's oasis centre of Dumat included agriculturists and craftsmen who practised farming.

Because the Qedarites and the Nabataeans were neighbours and often cooperated with each other, the two tribes were often listed together in Assyrian, Biblical and Graeco-Roman sources.

=== Social organisation ===
The large size of the area inhabited by the Qedarites, centred around the al-Jauf depression and ranging from the eastern border of Egypt till the western border of Babylonia, suggests that Qedar was a tribal federation made up of multiple sub-groups. The rules of Yauṯaʿ ben Ḥazaʾil and of ʿAmmu-laddin at the same time, and the attempt of Wahb to take over kingship of the Qedarites, as well as the replacement of Yauṯaʿ ben Ḥazaʾil by Abyaṯiʿ ben Teʾri as king of the Qedarites, all suggest that Qedar was a federation with multiple internal divisions, especially since both Wahb and Abyaṯiʿ appear to have been neither related to the family of Yauṯaʿ nor being members of their tribe. Leadership over the whole of the Qedarite federation could instead be transferred from one of its constituent tribes to another.

The Qedarites appear to have been ruled by several queens who resided in the confederation's centre of Dūmat.

One of the tribes which constituted the Qedarites were the Šumuʾilu, who appear to have lived in the eastern desert immediately adjoining the western borderlands of Babylonia, due to which a text from the time of the Assyrian king Sennacherib mentioned them and the Taymanites as passing through the abul madbari (Desert Gate) of Nineveh together to offer tribute to the king of the Neo-Assyrian Empire. The Šumuʾilu were led by Yuwaiṯiʿ ben Birdāda at the time of Ashurbanipal and Šamaš-šuma-ukin.

=== Language ===
The Qedarites were an Arab people whose main language was Old Arabic, which they wrote using the Ancient North Arabian script, as attested by the personal names of several of their rulers:

- the name of the first attested Qedarite king:
  - either جندب (Jindub), meaning lit. 'locust' (recorded in Akkadian as 𒁹𒄀𒅔𒁲𒁍𒀪, ᵐGindibuʾ);
  - or جندفاع (Jinn-difāʿ), meaning lit. 'the Genius is a protection', (recorded in Akkadian as 𒁹𒄀𒅔𒁲𒁍𒀪, ᵐGindipūʿ)
- زبيبة (Zabība), meaning "raisin" (recorded in Akkadian as 𒊩𒍝𒁉𒁉𒂊, ᶠZabibē)
- Abyaṯiʿ and Yaṯiʿe, which contain the Arabic theophoric component yṯʿ
- Yuwaiṯiʿ, which contains the Arabic theophoric component wṯʿ
- Birdāda which contains the Arabic theophoric component dd, which has also been recorded in Thamudic and Dadanitic Arabic
- Ancient North Arabian 𐪅𐪀𐪈, Arabic وهب (Wahb), recorded in Akkadian as 𒁹𒌑𒀀𒁍, ᵐUabu
- Yauṯaʿ, from Arabic ywṯʿ

The Qedarites also spoke Aramaic, with the names of some their kings being in Aramaic, such as Hazael, and ʿAmmu-laddin (lit. 'may my ancestor judge!'). During the early Hellenistic period, they are recorded as having written a letter in Aramaic to the Diadokhos Antigonus I Monophthalmus.

=== Dress ===
In Assyrian reliefs from the reign of Tiglath-pileser III, the Qedarite men are depicted wearing short loincloths, while the Qedarite women, including the queen Šamši, are dressed in long gowns covering their heads and arms: these clothes are similar to those required of Muslim pilgrims to wear during the state of ʾiḥrām when performing the ʿUmra and the Ḥajj, as well as to the clothes still worn by "pariah tribes" in present-day Arabia. The later traditional dress of Bedouins had thus not yet developed among Arabs during these early periods. In one scene, Šamši is depicted as a tribute-bearer wearing a long dress and a veil covering her head, and holding a bag, probably containing spices.

Unlike the settled peoples of the Fertile Crescent, the Qedarites shaved the hair of their foreheads and wore no head coverings. Both Biblical and ancient Greek sources describe the Qedarite Arabs as having "cropped hair," with Herodotus of Halicarnassus claiming that the cropping of the hair by Arabs was part of oath-giving traditions involving the gods ʿAttar-Šamē and ʿAttar-Kirrūm.

The ancient Greek historian Herodotus of Halicarnassus recorded that Arab infantry and camelry contingents of the Achaemenid army wore belted tunics.

=== Shelter ===
The nomadic Qedarites lived in black tents made of goat's and camel's hair and unfortified temporary settlements and were constantly on the move along with their flocks, while the sedentary population was concentrated around the oasis centre of Dūmat, which functioned as their economic, administrative and religious centres, and where was located the permanent houses of thousands of agriculturists and craftsmen.

The tents of the Qedarites were small and polygonal, and rested on a central pole, unlike the longer rectangular tents used by later Arabs. The Qedarite sedentary structures meanwhile consisted of camps with fences or low walls, as well as settlements that included fences and walled courtyards where cattle was reared.

=== Religion ===
The Qedarites practised the ancient North Arabian polytheistic religion, including the worship of idols of their six deities, whose names are attested as ʿAttar-Šamē, Dāya, Nuhay, Ruḍa, Abbīr-ʾilu. and ʿAttar-Kirrūm. In addition, the name of some Qedarite kings contained theophoric elements referencing the deities yṯʿ, wṯʿ, and dd.

The celestial god 𐪒𐪉𐪇𐪊𐪃 (ʿAttar-Šamē in Dumaitic Ancient North Arabian; recorded in Neo-Assyrian Akkadian as 𒀭𒀀𒋻𒊓𒈠𒀀𒀀𒅔, ᴰAtar-Samayin, reflecting the Aramaic form ʿAttar-Šamayin), was a local hypostasis of the Semitic deity ʿAṯtar, and was closely connected to the king of the Qedarites. ʿAttar-Šamē was the god representing the planet Venus, and his epithet Šamē (Old Aramaic: Šamāyīn; lit. 'of the Heavens') refers to his manifestation in the skies. Attesting of the significant Aramaean-Canaanite and Mesopotamian cultural impact on the Qedarites is the fact that the earliest record of the god ʿAttar-Šamayin is from an early Aramaic cylinder-seal dating from the 9th century BC belonging to one 𐡏𐡁𐡃 𐡏𐡕𐡓𐡔𐡌𐡉𐡍 (ʿbd ʿtršmyn, lit. 'servant of ʿAttar-Šamayin')), with the epithet Šamāyīn being also assigned to the Syro-Canaanite god Hadad in his hypostasis of Baʿal-Šamāyīn (lit. 'Baʿal of the Heavens').

The Qedarites also worshipped ʿAttar-Kirrūm, whose name meant "ʿAṯtar of the Rainfall" and was recorded in Neo-Assyrian Akkadian as 𒀭𒀀𒋻𒆪𒊒𒈠𒀀 (ᴰAtar-Kumrumā) and in Neo-Babylonian Akkadian as 𒀭𒆥𒀸𒈠 (ᴰKinruma), the latter of whom the Mesopotamians identified with their own deity of the planet Venus, the goddess 𒀭𒀹𒁯 (ᴰIštar). ʿAttar-Kirrūm was a hypostasis of ʿAṯtar representing him as a provider of fertility through the rain.

The Arab goddess al-ʾIlāt was the main goddess of the Qedarites, and the 5th century BC king of Qedar, Qainū, dedicated a silver bowl in which she is referred to in Aramaic as han-ʾIlat to her shrine located in the Egyptian city of Pithom.

The main religious centre of the Qedarites was their capital of Dūmat, where was performed the cults of ʿAttar-Šamē, Nuhay, and Ruḍaw. The queen of the Qedarites, who lived in Dūmat was also a priestess with sacral duties, as documented in the Assyrian records which referred to the queen Teʾelḫunu as the 𒊩𒀊𒆗𒆷𒌓 (ᶠapkallatu, lit. 'priestess', cognate with Old South Arabian 𐩱𐩰𐩫𐩡𐩩, ʾfklt) of a local goddess; the kings of the later Aramaised Arabs of Ḥaṭrāʾ would use a masculine variant of this title in the Aramaic form 𐣠𐣰𐣪𐣫𐣠 (ʾpklʾ).

=== Economy ===
The Qedarites participated in the extensive trade networks spanning the Syrian desert during the Iron Age. They reared sheep, donkeys, goats, and camels to be traded along these commercial routes, most especially with the Phoenician city of Tyre, and also participated in the trade of spices, aromatics such as frankincense, precious stones, and gold from South Arabia.

The Qedarites were thus members of a large commercial structure within which they provided the settled populations with animals, such as small cattle for food, wool production, and currency, as well as camels, which were useful for the Assyrians as a means of transport.

Under the rule of the Achaemenid Empire, the Qedarites controlled the northern end of both the maritime and overland the Arabian trade routes of the incense trade route through which spices, aromatics and other luxuries, such as frankincense, myrrh, cassia, cinnamon, and gum mastic, which flowed from South Arabia to the Mediterranean port of Gaza, which was under Qedarite rule.

The Qedarites also traded gold and precious stones, which they offered annually to the Assyrian Empire as part of their annual tribute.

=== Camel-riding ===
The Qedarites during the Neo-Assyrian and Neo-Babylonian periods are recorded to have domesticated and mounted dromedaries, which they used extensively. During these early periods, the Qedarites rode their camels by sitting over a cushion-saddle placed at the top of the camels' humps, but, by the 2nd century BCE, the cushion-saddle had been replaced by a proper saddle which made handling swords on camel-back easier for Qedarite warriors.

=== Warfare ===
Unlike the later Bedouin Arabs who often carried out razzias, the Qedarites were largely peaceful pastoralists whose involvement with the empires surrounding them primarily consisted of handling camels for transport and selling them cattle for food. The Qedarites were nevertheless proficient warriors whose skill in archery were mentioned in Assyrian records as well as in the Hebrew Bible; the earliest Qedarite warriors were camel-riding mounted archers who used the traditional hunting bow made of a single piece of wood, and the ancient Greek author Herodotus of Halicarnassus recorded that they were equipped with longbows in Achaemenid times. When fighting on foot, the Qedarites in the Assyrian period used small daggers with a broad blade.

The use of the camel was advantageous to Qedarite warriors, since its height provided them with an elevated position, and its swiftness and ability to flee into the desert made them difficult to be caught by their enemies, who tended to use horses, which were not very well adapted to the conditions of the dry and hot desert areas of the Syrian Desert.

At the peak of the Qedarite kingdom's power in the 5th and 4th centuries BCE, it had diversified its methods of warfare so that its armies included horse-mounted cavalry equipped with swords. During the early Hellenistic period, they are recorded as being armed with javelins, at which they were skilled enough to have defeated a Macedonian army, and by the 2nd century BCE, they had developed the use of long and slender swords and knives which allowed them to attack enemies at close range from their camels' backs.

== List of rulers ==
- King Gindibuʾ (c. 870–850 BCE; first mention of "Arabs" in Assyrian texts; not explicitly associated with Qedar)
- Queen Zabibe (c. 738 BCE; first monarch explicitly associated with Qedar in Assyrian texts)
- Queen Šamši (c. 733–715 BCE)
- Queen Yaṯiʿe (c. 703 BCE)
- Queen Teʾelḫunu (c. 690 BCE)
- King Ḫazaʾil (690–676 BCE) and Queen Tabūʿa (c. 681–676 BCE)
- King Yauṯaʿ (676–652 BCE) and Queen Adia (c. 650–647 BCE)
- King Yuwaiṯiʿ ben Birdāda of the Šumuʾilu (regent, nephew of Yauṯaʿ)
- King Ammu-ladi (regent)
- King Abyaṯiʿ ben Teʾri (652–644 BCE)
- King Mahlay ? (c. 510–490 BCE)
- King Iyas ibn Mahlay ? (c. 490–470 BCE)
- King Šahr (c. 470–450 BCE)
- King Gešem ben Šahr (c. 450–430 BCE)
- King Qainū bar Gešem (c. 430–410 BCE)

== Bibliography ==
- Alfonso, Esperanza (2007), Islamic Culture Through Jewish Eyes: Al-Andalus from the Tenth to Twelfth Century, Routledge, ISBN 9780415437325
- Avanzini, Alessandra (1997), Profumi d'Arabia: atti del convegno, L'ERMA di BRETSCHNEIDER, ISBN 9788870629750
- Barton, John (2004), The biblical world (Illustrated ed.), Taylor & Francis, ISBN 9780415350907
- Bechtel, F. (1908). "Cedar". In Hebermann, Charles G.; Pace, Edward A.; Pallen, Condé B.; Shahan, Thomas J.; Wynne, John J. (eds.). The Catholic Encyclopedia: An International Work of Reference on the Constitution, Doctrine, Discipline, and History of the Catholic Church. Vol. 3. New York City, United States: Robert Appleton Company. pp. 474–475.
- Beckett, Katharine Scarfe (2003), Anglo-Saxon perceptions of the Islamic world, Cambridge University Press, ISBN 9780521829403
- Bietak, Manfred (2015). "On the Historicity of the Exodus: What Egyptology Today Can Contribute to Assessing the Biblical Account of the Sojourn in Egypt". In Levy, Thomas E.; Schneider, Thomas; Propp, William H. C. (eds.). Israel's Exodus in Transdisciplinary Perspective: Text, Archaeology, Culture, and Geoscience. Springer. ISBN 978-3-319-04767-6.
- Blenkinsopp, Joseph (1988), Ezra-Nehemiah: A Commentary, Westminster John Knox Press, ISBN 9780664221867
- Block, Daniel Isaac (1998), The Book of Ezekiel: chapters 25-48, Volume 2 (Illustrated ed.), Wm. B. Eerdmans Publishing, ISBN 9780802825360
- Boardman, John (1991), John Boardman (ed.), The Assyrian and Babylonian empires and other states of the Near East, from the eighth to the sixth centuries B.C., Volume 3 (2nd, reprint ed.), Cambridge University Press, ISBN 9780521227179
- Cross, Frank Moore (2000), From Epic to Canon: History and Literature in Ancient Israel (Illustrated ed.), JHU Press, ISBN 9780801865336
- Davies, William David; Finkelstein, Louis; Horbury, William; Sturdy, John; Katz, Steven T. (1984), The Cambridge History of Judaism: Introd.; The Persian period (Illustrated, reprint ed.), Cambridge University Press, ISBN 9780521218801
- Ephʿal, Israel (1984). The Ancient Arabs: Nomads on the Borders of the Fertile Crescent, 9th-5th Centuries B.C. Jerusalem: Magnes Press. ISBN 978-0-685-74243-3.
- Ephʿal, Israel (1988). "Syria-Palestine under Achaemenid Rule". In Boardman, John; Hammond, N. G. L.; Lewis, D. M.; Ostwald, M. (eds.). Persia, Greece and the Western Mediterranean, c. 525 to 479 B.C. Cambridge, United Kingdom: Cambridge University Press. pp. 139–164. ISBN 978-0-521-22804-6.
- Eshel, Esther (2007). "The Onomasticon of Mareshah in the Persian and Hellenistic Periods". In Lipschitz, Oded; Knoppers, Gary N.; Albertz, Rainer (eds.). Judah and the Judeans in the Fourth Century B.C.E. Winona Lake, United States: Eisenbrauns. pp. 145–156 (see 149). ISBN 978-1-575-06130-6.
- Freedman, David Noel; Beck, Astrid B. (2000), Eerdmans dictionary of the Bible (Illustrated ed.), Wm. B. Eerdmans Publishing, ISBN 9780802824004
- Fulton, A. S. (1979). "Kedar". In Bromiley, Geoffrey W.; Harrison, Everett F.; Harrison, Roland K.; LaSor, William Sanford; Geraty, Lawrence T.; Smith, Jr., Edgar W. (eds.). The International Standard Bible Encyclopedia. Vol. 3. Grand Rapids, United States: William B. Eerdmans Publishing Company. p. 5. ISBN 978-0-802-83783-7.
- Gallagher, William R. (1999), Sennacherib's campaign to Judah: new studies (Illustrated ed.), BRILL, ISBN 9789004115378
- Gauthier, Henri (1928). Dictionnaire des Noms Géographiques Contenus dans les Textes Hiéroglyphiques [Dictionary of Geographical Names Contained in Hieroglyphic Texts] (in French). Vol. 5. Cairo, Kingdom of Egypt: Egyptian Royal Geographic Society.
- Graf, David F. (1997). "Palestine: Palestine in the Persian through Roman Periods". In Meyers, Eric M.; Dever, William G.; Meyers, Carol L.; Muhly, James D.; Pardee, Dennis; Sauer, James A.; Finney, Paul Corby; Jorgensen, John S. (eds.). The Oxford Encyclopedia of Archaeology in the Near East. Vol. 4. Oxford, United Kingdom; New York City, United States: Oxford University Press. pp. 222–228. ISBN 978-0-195-06512-1.
- Greenfield, Jonas C.; Paul, Shalom M.; Stone, Michael E; Pinnick, Avital (2001), Al kanfei Yonah: collected studies of Jonas C. Greenfield on Semitic philology (Illustrated ed.), BRILL, ISBN 9789004121706
- Groll, Sarah I. (1998). "The Egyptian background of the Exodus and the crossing of the Reed Sea: A new reading of Papyrus Anastasi VIII". In Irene, Shirun-Grumach (ed.). Jerusalem Studies in Egyptology. Harrassowitz. ISBN 978-3-447-04085-3.
- Guzzo, Maria Giulia Amadasi; Schneider, Eugenia Equini; Cochrane, Lydia G. (2002), Petra (Illustrated ed.), University of Chicago Press, ISBN 9780226311258
- Handy, Lowell K. (1997), The age of Solomon: scholarship at the turn of the millennium (Illustrated ed.), BRILL, ISBN 9789004104761
- Hayajneh, Hani (2012). "Remarks On Ancient North Arabian Inscriptions From The Region Of Taymāʾ In Northwest Arabia (I)". In Kiraz, George; al-Salameen, Zeyad (eds.). From Ugarit to Nabataea: Studies in Honor of John F. Healey. Gorgias Ugaritic Studies. Vol. 6. Piscataway, United States: Gorgias Press. pp. 123–140. ISBN 978-1-463-23503-1.
- Hoyland, Robert G. (2001), Arabia and the Arabs: from the Bronze Age to the coming of Islam (Illustrated, reprint ed.), Routledge, ISBN 9780415195355
- al-Jallad, Ahmad (2022). The Religion and Rituals of the Nomads of Pre-Islamic Arabia: A Reconstruction Based on the Safaitic Inscriptions. Ancient Languages and Civilizations. Vol. 1. Leiden, Netherlands; Boston, United States: Brill Publishers. ISBN 978-9-004-50426-4.
- Janzen, Mark D. (2024). "The Land of Goshen: A Socio-Spatial Analysis (Gen 45:10; 46:28–47:6; 47:27; 50:8; Exod 8:22; 9:26)". In Beitzel, Barry J. (ed.). Lexham Geographic Commentary on the Pentateuch. Lexham Press. pp. 341–352. ISBN 978-1-68359-729-2.
- King, Philip J. (1993), Jeremiah: An Archaeological Companion (Illustrated ed.), Westminster John Knox Press, ISBN 9780664224431
- Kitchen, K.A. (1994), Documentation For Ancient Arabia, Part 2, Liverpool University Press, ISBN 978-0-85323-860-7
- Kitchen, Kenneth (2001). "Economics in Ancient Arabia from Alexander to the Augustans". In Archibald, Zofia H.; Davies, John; Gabrielsen, Vincent; Oliver, G. J. (eds.). Hellenistic Economies. London, United Kingdom: Routledge. pp. 119–132. ISBN 978-1-134-56592-4.
- LaSor, W. S. (1979). "Dumah". In Bromiley, Geoffrey W.; Harrison, Everett F.; Harrison, Roland K.; LaSor, William Sanford; Smith, Jr., Edgar W. (eds.). The International Standard Bible Encyclopedia. Vol. 1. Grand Rapids, United States: William B. Eerdmans Publishing Company. p. 995. ISBN 978-0-802-83781-3.
- Leslie, John A. K. (1999), Students' aid to pre-modern Middle Eastern studies, Pentland, ISBN 9781858216980
- Lipiński, Edward (2000). The Aramaeans: Their Ancient History, Culture, Religion. Orientalia Lovaniensia analecta. Vol. 100. Leuven, Belgium: Peeters Publishers. ISBN 978-9-042-90859-8.
- Lipiński, Edward (2004). Itineraria Phoenicia. Orientalia Lovaniensia analecta. Vol. 127. Leuven, Belgium: Peeters Publishers. ISBN 978-9-042-91344-8.
- Lipiński, Edward (2006). On the Skirts of Canaan in the Iron Age: Historical and Topographical Researches. Orientalia Lovaniensia analecta. Vol. 153. Leuven, Belgium: Peeters Publishers. ISBN 978-9-042-91798-9.
- Malamat, Abraham; Ben-Sasson, Haim Hillel (1976), A History of the Jewish People (11th, reprint, illustrated ed.), Harvard University Press, ISBN 9780674397316
- al-Mousawi, Hussain (1998). "The Genealogy of the Prophet Muhammed and the Royal Houses of the Middle East with emphasis on the Hashemite (Alawaite) Kingdoms". Genealogica & Heraldica : Actes Du 22e Congrès International Des Sciences Généalogique Et Héraldique À Ottawa, 18-23 Août 1996 [Genealogica & Heraldica: Proceedings of the 22nd International Congress of Genealogical and Heraldic Sciences in Ottawa, August 18–23, 1996]. Ottawa, Canada: University of Ottawa Press. pp. 219–238. ISBN 978-0-776-60472-5.
- Neusner, Jacob (2006), Jeremiah in Talmud and Midrash: a source book, University Press of America, ISBN 9780761834878
- Roth, Norman (1994), Jews, Visigoths, and Muslims in medieval Spain: cooperation and conflict, BRILL, ISBN 9789004099715
- Routledge, Bruce Edward (2004), Moab in the Iron Age: hegemony, polity, archaeology (Illustrated ed.), University of Pennsylvania Press, ISBN 9780812238013
- Paton, Lewis Bayles (2008), The Early History of Syria and Palestine, BiblioBazaar, LLC, ISBN 9780554479590
- Rabinowitz, Isaac (1956). "Aramaic Inscriptions of the Fifth Century B. C. E. from a North-Arab Shrine in Egypt". Journal of Near Eastern Studies. 15 (1). Chicago, United States: University of Chicago Press: 1–9. doi:10.1086/371302. JSTOR 542658. S2CID 161559065.
- Retsö, Jan (2013). The Arabs in Antiquity: Their History from the Assyrians to the Umayyads. London; New York City: Routledge. ISBN 978-1-136-87289-1.
- Shahîd, Irfan (1989). Byzantium and the Arabs in the Fifth Century. Washington, D.C., United States: Dumbarton Oaks. pp. 335–336. ISBN 978-0-884-02152-0.
- Shuaib, Marwan (2014). The Arabs of North Arabia in later Pre-Islamic Times: Qedar, Nebaioth, and Others. Manchester University.
- Stearns, Peter N.; Langer, William Leonard (2001), The Encyclopedia of world history: ancient, medieval, and modern, chronologically arranged (6th, illustrated ed.), Houghton Mifflin Harcourt, ISBN 9780395652374
- Stern, Ephraim (1984). "The Persian empire and the political and social history of Palestine in the Persian period". In Davies, W. D.; Finkelstein, Louis (eds.). The Persian Period. The Cambridge History of Judaism. Vol. 1. Cambridge, United Kingdom: Cambridge University Press. pp. 70–87. ISBN 978-0-521-21880-1.
- Sudayrī, ʻAbd al-Raḥmān ibn Aḥmad ibn Muḥammad; ʻAbd al-Raḥmān al-Sudairī Foundation (2001), The desert frontier of Arabia: al-Jawf through the ages (Illustrated ed.), Stacey International, ISBN 9780905743868
- Taylor, Jane (2001), Petra and the lost kingdom of the Nabataeans (Illustrated ed.), I.B.Tauris, ISBN 9781860645082
- Teppo, Saana (2005). "Foreign Leaders and Queens" (PDF). Women and their Agency in the Neo-Assyrian Empire (Thesis). Helsinki, Finland: University of Helsinki.
- Van Seters, John (2001). "The Geography of the Exodus". In Dearman, J. Andrew; Graham, M. Patrick (eds.). The Land that I Will Show You: Essays on the History and Archaeology of the Ancient Near East in Honor of J. Maxwell Miller. Journal for the Study of the Old Testament: Supplement Series. Vol. 343. Sheffield, United Kingdom: Sheffield Academic Press. pp. 255–276. ISBN 978-0-567-35580-5.
- Wheeler, Brannon M. (2002), Prophets in the Quran: an introduction to the Quran and Muslim exegesis (Annotated ed.), Continuum International Publishing Group, ISBN 9780826449566
- Zepp, Ira G.; Syeed, Sayyid Muhammad; Islamic Society of North America (2000), A Muslim primer: beginner's guide to Islam (2nd illustrated ed.), University of Arkansas Press, ISBN 9781557285959
