= Ḫazaʾil =

- King of Qedar
- Reign: c. 690–676 BCE
- Predecessor: Teʾelḫunu
- Successor: Yauṯaʿ
- Born: c. end of the 8th century BCE
- Religion: North Arabian polytheism

Ḫazaʾil (Akkadian: 𒄩𒍝𒀪𒀭, romanized: Ḫa-za-’-ilu) was a Qedarite king regnant who ruled in the 7th century BCE. He was a contemporary of the Neo-Assyrian kings Sennacherib and Esarhaddon.

== Life ==
Hazael was a Qedarite king regnant and an associate of the queen of Qedar, Teʾelḫunu. When Teʾelḫunu had been defeated and taken captive by Sennacherib, the king of the Neo-Assyrian Empire, Hazael fled from his territory. After Sennacherib's death and the ascension of Esarhaddon to the royal throne of Assyria, Hazael contacted the new king and made peace with him. Esarhaddon accepted the request for peace and returned several stolen idols to the Qedarites, and also appointed the young princess Tabūʿa to rule associated with Hazael.

Hazael had a son named Yauṯaʿ whose reign is dated to around 676–652 BCE.
