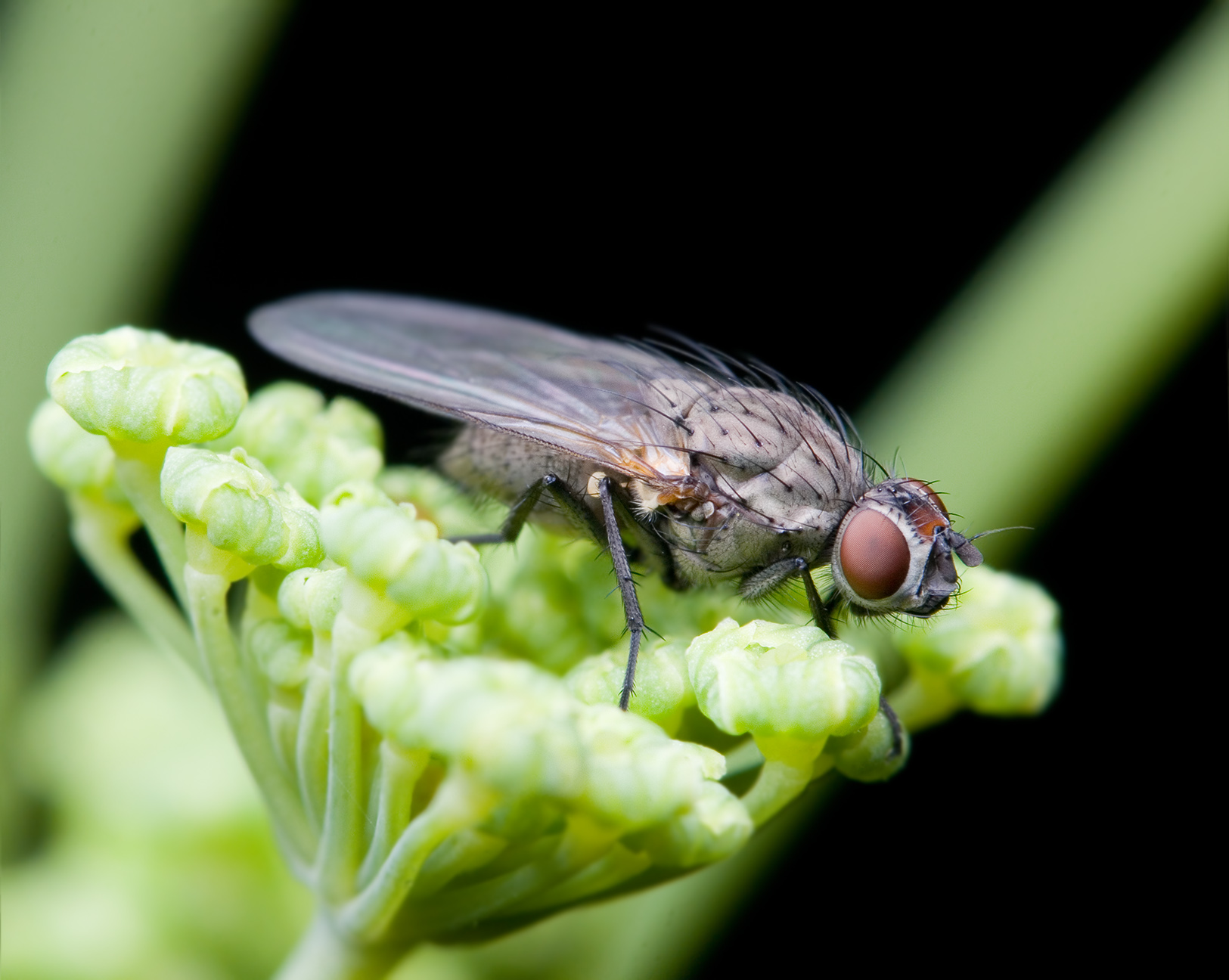

Scientific classification
- Kingdom: Animalia
- Phylum: Arthropoda
- Class: Insecta
- Order: Diptera
- Superfamily: Muscoidea
- Family: Anthomyiidae
- Genus: Adia
- Species: A. cinerella

Binomial name
- Adia cinerella (Fallén, 1825)

Synonyms
- Musca cinerella Fallén, 1825; Adia oralis (Robineau-Desvoidy, 1830); Anthomyia pusilla (Meigen, 1826); Anthomyia trigonomaculata (Macquart, 1851); Anthomyia virescens (Macquart, 1851); Aricia interruptilinea (Zetterstedt, 1860); Aricia remorata (Holmgren, 1883); Chortophila excubans (Pandellé, 1900); Egle trigonigaster (Pandellé, 1900); Hylemyia similis (Fitch, 1856); Nerina albipennis (Robineau-Desvoidy, 1830); Nerina flavescens (Robineau-Desvoidy, 1830)

= Adia cinerella =

Species of fly

Adia cinerella is a species of fly in the family Anthomyiidae. They are widely distributed in North America from Yukon Territory to Greenland, Mexico, Georgia, the Bermuda islands and in Europe.
