= Adia (name) =

Adia is a Swahili name meaning "gift".

== People ==
- Adia (musician) (born 1991), stage name of Destiny Adia Andrews
- Adia (queen), Arab figure associated with the ancient Kingdom of Qeda
- Adia Barnes (born 1977), American women's basketball coach
- Adia Benton (born 1977), American cultural and medical anthropologistdevelopment...
- Adia Budde (born 2005), German middle-distance runner and steeplechaser
- Adia Chan (born 1971), Indonesian-born Hong Kong actress, singer, model
- A'dia Mathies (born 1991), American professional basketball player
- Adia Millett (born 1975), contemporary American multi-media artist
- Adia Symmonds (born 2007), American college soccer player
- Adia Victoria (born 1986), American singer and songwriter
- Adia Harvey Wingfield, American professor of sociology
- Uyoyou Adia, Nigerian actress and film director
