= William Sanford LaSor =

American pastor and scholar

- Born: October 25, 1911; Philadelphia, Pennsylvania, U.S.
- Died: January 11, 1991 (aged 79); Altadena, California, U.S.
- Occupation: Academic

Academic background
- Education: University of Pennsylvania (BA); Princeton Theological Seminary (BTh); Dropsie College for Hebrew and Cognate Learning (PhD); University of Southern California (DTh)

Academic work
- Discipline: Theology
- Sub-discipline: Biblical studies Old Testament

William Sanford LaSor (October 25, 1911 – 1991) was an American academic who worked as a professor emeritus of Old Testament at Fuller Theological Seminary in Pasadena, California.

== Early life and education ==
LaSor was born in Philadelphia. Ordained in the United Presbyterian Church, he served churches in New Jersey and Pennsylvania prior to World War II and served in United States Navy Chaplain Corps chaplain from 1943 to 1946 in the Asiatic-Pacific Theater.

LaSor held six degrees, ranging from chemistry to Oriental languages and literature. He earned a Bachelor of Theology from the Princeton Theological Seminary in 1934 and was awarded the first place Scribner Prize for New Testament literature. In 1949, he received the Doctor of Philosophy degree from Dropsie College for Hebrew and Cognate Learning in Philadelphia. In addition, he held the Doctor of Theology degree from the University of Southern California.

== Career ==
LaSor began his career as a professor of religion at Lafayette College. Joining Fuller Theology Seminary in 1949 as an associate professor of Old Testament, he retired in 1980 with emeritus status.

The William Sanford LaSor memorial library was left to Oral Roberts University. The library is held on the 4th floor of the Learning Resource Center.

== Personal life ==
LaSor died on January 11, 1991, at his home in Altadena, California.

== Publications ==
He authored and edited seventeen books. A minor sample follows:

- LaSor, William Sanford. "The Messiahs of Aaron and Israel." Vetus Testamentum 6, no. 4 (1956): 425–429.
- ________. "Secondary Opening of Syllables Originally Closed with Gutturals (in Hebrew)." Journal of Near Eastern Studies 15, no. 4 (1956): 246–250.
- ________. The Dead Sea Scrolls and the New Testament. Grand Rapids, Mich.: Eerdmans, 1972.
- ________. Israel : A Biblical View. Grand Rapids, Mich.: Eerdmans, 1976.
- ________. Handbook of Biblical Hebrew : (An Inductive Approach Based on the Hebrew Text of Esther, 2 Vols. in 1). Grand Rapids: Eerdmans, 1989. ISBN 978-0802804440.
- ________. The Truth About Armageddon : What the Bible Says About the End Times. Grand Rapids, MI: Baker Book House, 1987. ISBN 978-0801056376.
- LaSor, William Sanford, Peter Hintzoglou, and Eric N. Jacobsen. Handbook of New Testament Greek: An Inductive Approach Based on the Greek Text of Acts. Grand Rapids, MI.: Eerdmans, 1973.
- LaSor, William Sanford, David Allan Hubbard, and Frederic William Bush. Old Testament Survey : The Message, Form, and Background of the Old Testament, 2/ed. Grand Rapids, Mich.: Eerdmans, 1996. ISBN 978-0802837882.
- LaSor, William Sanford, and Gary A. Tuttle. Biblical and near Eastern Studies : Essays in Honor of William Sanford LaSor. Grand Rapids: Eerdmans, 1978. ISBN 978-0802835000.
