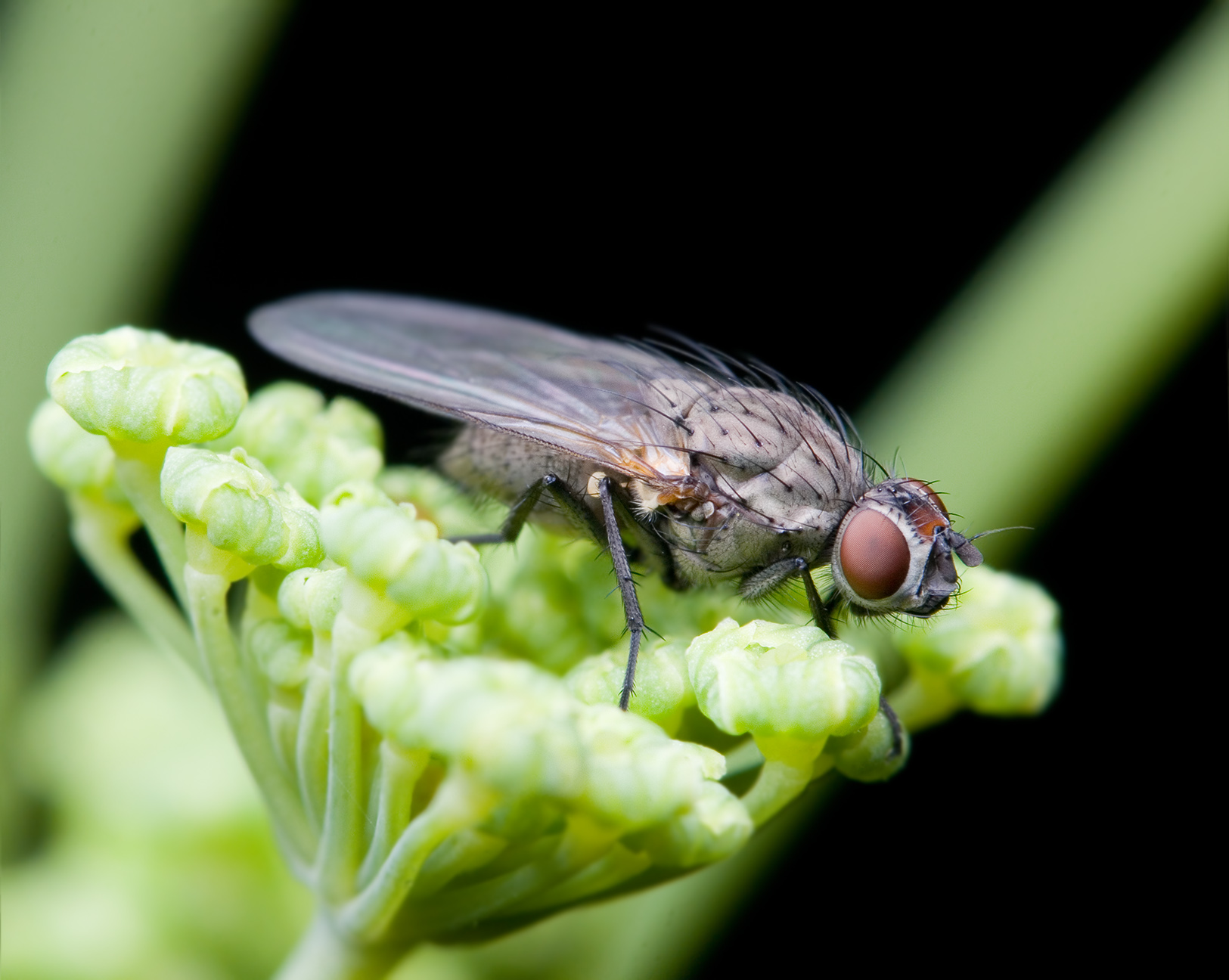
- Adia cinerella

Scientific classification
- Kingdom: Animalia
- Phylum: Arthropoda
- Clade: Pancrustacea
- Class: Insecta
- Order: Diptera
- Superfamily: Muscoidea
- Family: Anthomyiidae
- Genus: Adia; Robineau-Desvoidy, 1830

Type species
- Adia oralis Robineau-Desvoidy, 1830

Synonyms
- Scategle Fan in Ye et al., 1982

= Adia (fly) =

Genus of flies

Adia is a genus of flies in the family Anthomyiidae.

== Species ==
- A. aharonii (Hennig, 1976)
- Adia alatavensis (Hennig, 1967)
- Adia asiatica Fan, 1988
- Adia cinerea (Robineau-Desvoidy, 1830)
- A. cinerella (Fallén, 1825)
- A. grisella (Rondani, 1871)
- Adia coerulescens (Strobl, 1893)
- Adia danieli (Gregor, 1975)
- Adia densibarbata (Fan, 1982)
- Adia grisella (Rondani, 1871)
