= Yaṯiʿe =

- Queen of Qedar
- Reign: c. 703 BCE
- Predecessor: Possibly Samsi
- Successor: Possibly Te'el-hunu
- Born: c. end of the 8th century BCE
- Religion: North Arabian polytheism

Yaṯiʿe (Old Arabic: Yaṯiʿe; Akkadian: 𒅀𒋾𒀪𒂊, romanized: Yatiʾe), also spelled Iatie, was a queen of the Nomadic Arab tribes of Qedar who ruled in the 8th century BC.

Yatie sent her forces, headed by her brother Basqanu (Akkadian: 𒁀𒊍𒋡𒀀𒉡 Bâsqânu), to aid Merodach-Baladan in his bid to hold on to Babylon. Merodach-Baladan, the leader of the Chaldeans, was also supported by an army from Elam and together these faced the Assyrian forces of Sennacherib on his first campaign in 703 BC.

The events of the battle are recorded in the annals of Sennacherib which mention Yatie, "queen of the Arabs", and the capture of her brother Baasqanu in the battle. Israel Eph'al writes that this is the first mention in Assyrian documents of Arabs as an ethnic element in Babylonia. Yatie's predecessor was Samsi and she was succeeded by queen Te'el-hunu.

== Bibliography ==
- Boardman, John (1924), The Cambridge Ancient History (2nd ed.), Cambridge University Press, ISBN 9780521227179
- Ephʻal, Israel (1982), The Ancient Arabs: Nomads on the Borders of the Fertile Crescent 9th-5th Centuries B.C, BRILL, ISBN 9789652234001
- Leslie, John A. K. (1999), Students' aid to pre-modern Middle Eastern studies, Pentland, ISBN 9781858216980
