= Yauṯaʿ =

- King of Qedar
- Reign: c. 676–652 BCE
- Predecessor: Ḫazaʾil
- Successor: Abyaṯiʿ ben Teʾri
- Born: c. end of the 8th century BCE
- Religion: North Arabian polytheism

Yauṯaʿ, also spelled Iauta, was a vassal king of Qedar under the Neo-Assyrian Empire who reigned in the 7th century BCE. He was the son of his predecessor, King Ḫazaʾil, assuming power after his father had died. His reign ended around 652 BCE after the Neo-Assyrian ruler Ashurbanipal had him dethroned and publicly humiliated for not paying the annual tribute.

== Reign ==
Yauṯaʿ took power after his predecessor and father had died. Between 676 and 673 BCE, a man named 'Wahb staged a powerful rebellion against Yauṯaʿ that completely dethroned him; as a result of this he requested help from the Neo-Assyrian Empire to reinstate him as king of the Qedarites. A few years after he had been reinstated as king, Yauṯaʿ tried to exercise full independence of his kingdom, and stopped paying the annual tribute to the Neo-Assyrian Empire which prompted a campaign against him by the Neo-Assyrian ruler Esarhaddon.

Yauṯaʿ fled from his throne, but during the reign of Ashurbanipal he came back to power after being forgiven by the latter. Despite this, Yauṯaʿ eventually tried to ditch his connections with the Neo-Assyrian Empire again, which prompted Ashurbanipal to invade his territory, capture him and take him to Nineveh where he was publicly shamed.

Even after his rule and public humiliation, there is an inscription which does state that he assisted the king Abyaṯiʿ ben Teʾri in a revolt against Ashurbanipal.
