= Šamši =

Arab queen (8th century BCE)

- Queen of Qedar
- Reign: c. 733–715 BCE
- Predecessor: Possibly Zabibe
- Successor: Possibly Yatie
- Born: c. 8th century BCE
- Religion: North Arabian polytheism

Šamsi (Old Arabic: Šamši; Akkadian: 𒊓𒄠𒋛, romanized: Sâmsi) was an Arab queen who reigned in the Ancient Near East, in the 8th century BCE. She succeeded Queen Zabibe (Arabic meaning "Raisin"). Tiglath-Pileser III, son of Ashur-nirari V and king of Assyria, was the first foreign ruler to bring the Arabs under his control. When Šamsi rebelled against him by joining an alliance forged by Rakhianu of Damascus, Pileser attacked and defeated Samsi, made her and her alliance partners surrender, and pay a tribute to remain in power. She ruled for over 20 years and her successor was Queen Iatie, in about 700 BC.

== History ==
The Assyrian chronicles describe Queen Šamsi as a powerful ruler who was bold enough to face the Assyrian kings in the 730s and 720s. She and others are mentioned as rulers of the regions far to the west of Assyria who were aware of the Assyrian kings and had trade with them in spices. Šamsi and her predecessor and successor queens had led embassies and caravans carrying spices and incense to the Near East and Syria from the Arabian Peninsula.

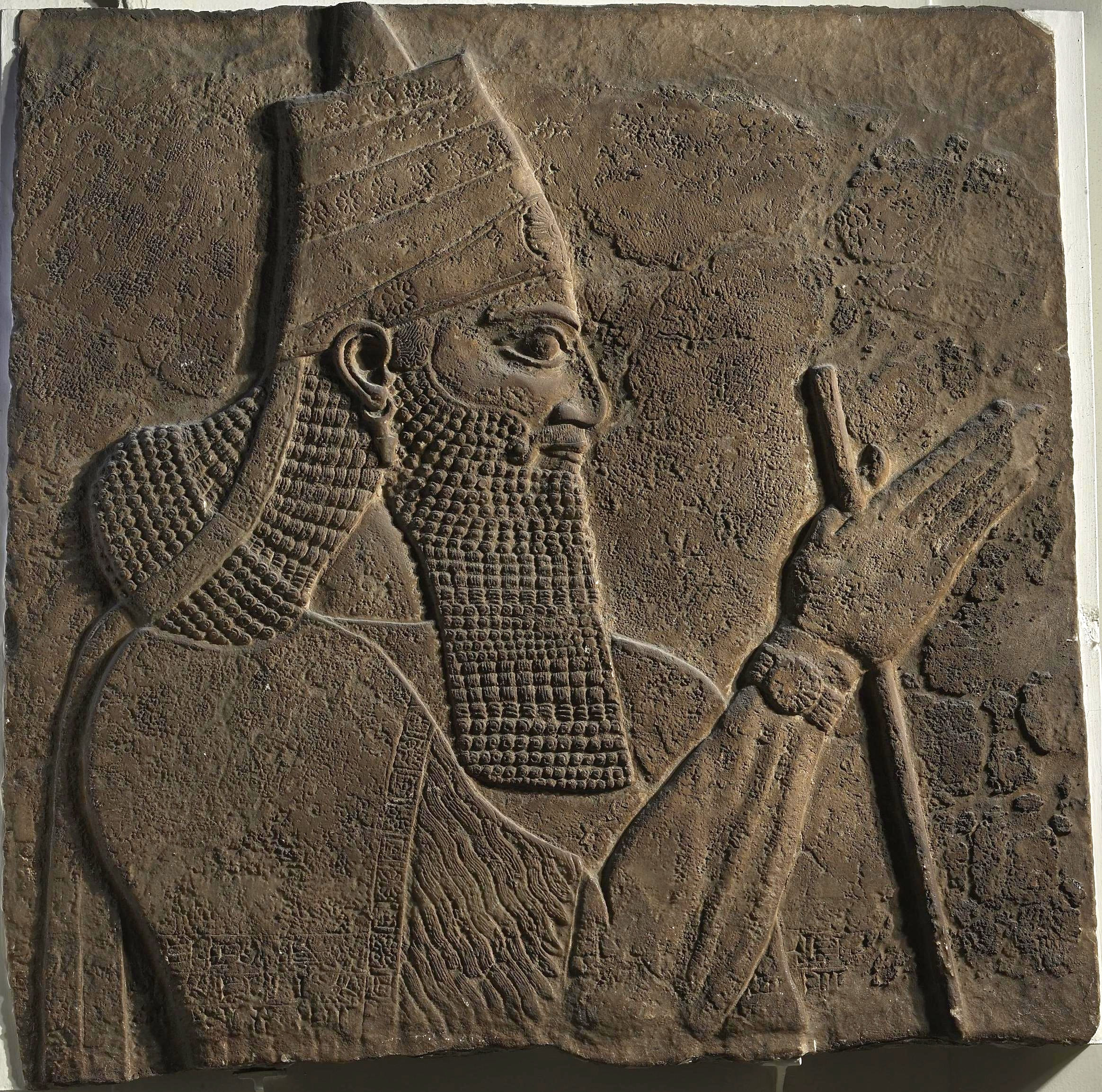
Tiglath-Pileser III

Šamsi had come to power as a vassal of Assyria, succeeding the former Arabian queen Zabibe, who had abdicated in Šamsi's favour. Zabibe's oath of allegiance was continued by Šamsi on taking the throne; she swore by the sun, the god of Arabia, that she would be loyal to Assyria. Tiglath-Pileser gave formal recognition to this accession. Later, however, she changed her mind and rebelled, joining an alliance made by Rezin of Damascus to fight the Assyrian king Tiglath-Pileser III in 732 BCE.

The Assyrian army under King Tiglath-Pileser III (ruled 745–727 BCE) had recently subjugated the land of Edom and now turned its attention to the anti-Assyrian forces in Arabia and the Levant. According to the Assyrian records, Tiglath-Pileser attacked many Arab tribal areas and defeated Šamsi in the neighborhood of Mount Sa-qu-ur-ri (a place not identified). The Assyrians took many prisoners of war, 30,000 camels, and more than 20,000 oxen as booty. An inscription records that 9,400 of her soldiers were killed, and in addition 5,000 bags of various types of spices, altars of gods, armaments including an ornamental staff of her goddess, and her estates were seized. As she fled to the desert, Tiglath-Pileser set fire to the remaining tents at the battle site.

After her defeat, Šamsi was said by the Assyrian chroniclers to have fled the battlefield like a "wild she-ass of the desert". She did not remain at liberty for long, as she was soon captured and brought as prisoner to Tiglath-Pileser. He appointed a qepu or governor over her and 10,000 soldiers, and restored her to her kingdom. It is also said that she had escaped to the land of Bazu/Basu and later surrendered. The terms of surrender to Tiglath-Pileser involved a tribute to be paid by Šamsi. The Assyrians chose to restore her as they needed a pliable Arab ruler in order to maintain the lucrative north–south trade route from Assyrian territory across Arabia. Seven other kingdoms involved in Arabian commerce were also required to pay tribute and provide security to their incense trade; these seven kingdoms were Massa, Tyma, Saba, Haiappa (Ephah), Badana, Hattia, and Idibi'lu. The tribute agreed to be paid by the Arabs included gold, silver, male and female camels, and all types of spices.

== See also ==
- Dumat al-Jandal
- Arab queens

== Bibliography ==
- Leick, Gwendolyn (27 September 2001). Who's Who in the Ancient Near East. Psychology Press. ISBN 978-0-415-13231-2.
- Ephʻal, Israel (1982). The Ancient Arabs: Nomads on the Borders of the Fertile Crescent, 9Th-5Th Centuries B.C. BRILL. ISBN 965-223-400-1.
- Maalouf, Tony. Arabs in the Shadow of Israel: The Unfolding of God's Prophetic Plan for Ishmael's Line. Kregel Academic. ISBN 978-0-8254-9363-8.
- Mayor, Adrienne (22 September 2014). The Amazons: Lives and Legends of Warrior Women across the Ancient World. Princeton University Press. ISBN 978-1-4008-6513-0.
- Retso, Jan (4 July 2013). The Arabs in Antiquity: Their History from the Assyrians to the Umayyads. Routledge. ISBN 978-1-136-87282-2.
- Smith, George (25 September 2014). Assyria. Cambridge University Press. ISBN 978-1-108-07906-8.
- Wood, Michael (2005). In Search of Myths & Heroes: Exploring Four Epic Legends of the World. University of California Press. ISBN 978-0-520-24724-6.
