= Zabibe =

Queen of Qedar (8th century BC)

- Queen of Qedar
- Reign: c. 738 BCE
- Predecessor: Unknown
- Successor: Possibly Samsi
- Born: c. early 8th century BCE
- Religion: North Arabian polytheism

Zabibe (also transliterated Zabibi, Zabiba, Zabibah; Akkadian: 𒍝𒁉𒁉𒂊 Zabibê) was a queen of Qedar. She was a vassal of Tiglath-Pileser III, king of Assyria, and is mentioned in the Annals of Tiglath-Pileser III among a list of monarchs who paid tribute to the king in 738 BC. The title accorded her is queen of the Aribi (Arabs). Israel Eph'al argues that, until the time of Assurbanipal, the title "king or queen of the Arabs" in Assyrian manuscripts was a general one accorded to leaders of the nomadic Bedouin tribes of the Syrian desert. So, he infers that Zabibe would have been properly titled "queen of the Qidri" (Qedarites). Zabībah is an ancient Arabic name, likely derived from zabīb (arabic: زبيب), meaning "raisin". She was succeeded by another queen, Samsi. She is described in Neo-Assyrian sources as the ruler of an Arab kingdom centred on the oasis city of Adummatu — present-day Dumat al-Jandal in northern Saudi Arabia — which served as the political and religious capital of the Qedarites during the 8th century BC.

== Bibliography ==
- Ephʻal, Israel (1982). The Ancient Arabs: Nomads on the Borders of the Fertile Crescent 9th-5th Centuries B.C. Brill. ISBN 978-965-223-400-1.
