= Adia (queen) =

Queen Adia, also spelled Adiye, was an Arab queen who reigned in c. 650–647 BCE. She was a prominent Arab figure associated with the ancient Kingdom of Qedar, a powerful tribal polity in the northern Arabian Desert during the first millennium BCE. Her life became known primarily from Neo-Assyrian royal inscriptions, which document interactions between Arab rulers and the Neo-Assyrian Empire.

== Biography ==
She was titled both šarratu, the title for a reigning queen, and "wife of Iauta," the title for the wife of a king, so she could have been both.

Adia was the wife of Yauṯaʿ, king of Qedar during the reign of Ashurbanipal. According to Assyrian records, Yauṯaʿ was captured by Natnu ruler of the Nebaioth and was handed over to Ashurbanipal.

After the fall of her husband and the capture of his nephew Yuwaiṯiʿ ben Birdāda, leadership among the Qedarites passed to Ammu-ladi. During this period, Adia remained politically active. She participated in a coalition alongside king Ammu-ladi in a rebellion against Assyrian domination.

This alliance represented a broader effort among Arabian groups to resist Assyrian control. However, the coalition was defeated by Kamas-halta, king of Moab. As a result, Adia was taken captive and brought to Nineveh.

== Sources ==
- Durand, Jean-Marie (1987). La femme dans le proche-orient antique. Editions Recherche sur les Civilisations. ISBN 9782865381777.
- Sami Saeed Al Ahmed (2018). Southern Mesopotamia in the Time of Ashurbanipal. De Gruyter. ISBN 9783111396170.
- Shuaib, Marwan (2014). The Arabs of North Arabia in later Pre-Islamic Times: Qedar, Nebaioth, and Others. Manchester University.
