= Chandipat Sahay =

Bihari zamindar, politician and music patron

The Hon'ble Chandipat Sahay MLC was a principal zamindar and ruler of the Patna zamindari estate, primarily governing the district of Patna. He also served a term as a Member of Legislative Council in the Legislative Council of the Governor of Bihar and Orissa, representing the Patna Division Landholders' Constituency, where he was appointed to the Panel of chairmen.

== Politics ==
He was appointed to the Legislative Council of the Governor of Bihar and Orissa by Sir Henry Wheeler in 1923. He was also a member of the Licensing Board of Patna.

Drawing from his own experiences as a zamindar, he was responsible for the abolition of the chaukidari tax in Bihar and Orissa Province. In 1931, he was invited by Sir Mohammad Fakhruddin, Rajendra Prasad, Sachchidananda Sinha, and Syed Abdul Aziz to assist in preventing Hindu-Muslim riots in Bihar.

== Music patronage ==
He was a patron of Hindustani classical music, and hosted some of the greatest classical musicians at his estate in Patna. Pandit Vishnu Digambar Paluskar performed there for two consecutive days, whereas other performers included Ahmed Jan Thirakwa and Maharajji Berve.

In 1931, he founded Sangeet Sadan along with Hari Narayan Kapoor, the only music school in Patna at the time, in his estate's palace. Since music was taboo at the time, he established the school to educate the people about its nuances and remove the stigma associated with music. The first five students of the school came from the Sahay family itself. His son, Jwalapati Sahay, a zamindar, emerged as one of the best Khayal singers of his time.
The school was also supported by his peers, including Sir Sultan Ahmed, Sir Ganesh Dutt, Rajandhari Sinha, Lady Imam, Madhav Shrihari Aney, Raja Rajiv Ranjan Prasad Sinha, Sir Fazl Ali and Sachchidananda Sinha, among others.

== See also ==
- Zamindars of Bihar
- Bihar and Orissa Province
- Bihar Legislative Council
- Hindustani classical music
