= Patricia Stephenson =

Irish politician

Senator Patricia Stephenson
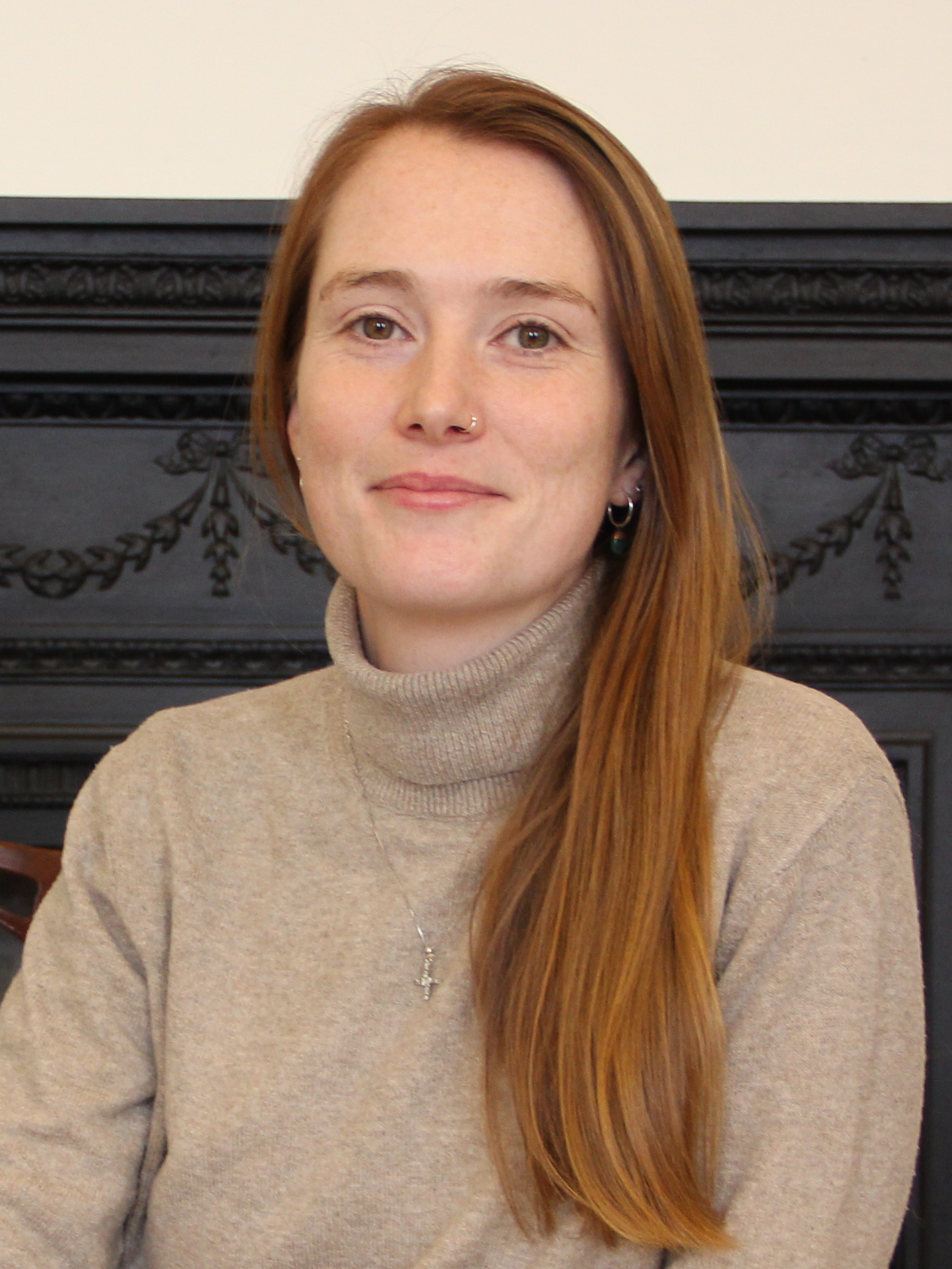
- Stephenson in 2025

Senator
- Incumbent
- Assumed office January 2025
- Constituency: Labour Panel

Personal details
- Born: 1991/1992 (age 33–34) Belfast, Northern Ireland
- Party: Social Democrats
- Parent: Jonathan Stephenson (father)
- Relatives: Hugh Stephenson (uncle); Hugh Southern Stephenson (grandfather); Hugh Lansdown Stephenson (great-grandfather)
- Education: University of Oxford; SOAS University of London

Patricia Stephenson (born 1991/1992) is an Irish Social Democrats politician who has been a senator for the Labour Panel since January 2025.

Stephenson began her career working in international development and aid. She was an unsuccessful candidate at the 2024 general election for the Carlow–Kilkenny constituency.

== Early and personal life ==
Stephenson was raised in a politically engaged family in South Belfast. Her father, Jonathan Stephenson, was a trade unionist, former Belfast City councillor, and a prominent figure in the Social Democratic and Labour Party, serving as the party's first press officer and later as chairperson between 1995 and 1998. Her mother, Marga Foley, was also active in the SDLP and stood unsuccessfully in local elections. Stephenson has stated that her mother's influence on her political development is often overlooked. On her father's side, she comes from a family with a diplomatic tradition, including a grandfather, Hugh Southern Stephenson who served as a British ambassador and high commissioner and a great-grandfather, Hugh Lansdown Stephenson, who held a senior position in the Indian Civil Service during British rule, although she says these diplomatic connections had little influence on her own political outlook.

Patricia studied history at the University of Oxford before completing a postgraduate degree in the political economy of violence, conflict, and development at SOAS University of London. She then worked as an aid worker in several African countries, including South Sudan, Somalia, and Uganda. After returning to Ireland and settling on the Carlow-Kilkenny border with her partner in Coolcullen near Castlecomer in County Kilkenny,, she became involved with the Social Democrats, initially volunteering for Gary Gannon before stepping back while renovating a former parish hall into a home. She later re-engaged with the party, motivated by concerns about the quality of public services and a desire to contribute to political change.

== Political career ==
In 2024, Stephenson contested the 2024 Irish general election for the Social Democrats as a candidate in Carlow–Kilkenny but was unsuccessful, before subsequently being elected to Seanad Éireann on the Labour Panel.

In October 2025, Stephenson introduced the Domestic Violence (Free Travel Scheme) Bill 2025, proposing a nationwide scheme to give domestic violence survivors and their dependents free travel passes valid across State transport services. In May 2026, the Department of Social Protection introduced the Domestic Violence Travel Supplement, broadly reflecting the proposal. It allows applicants to access transport support without a means test for the first three months, after which continued access may be extended subject to a means assessment and eligibility review. Stephenson described the move as an unusual instance of a government adopting an opposition proposal and credited the Minister for Social Protection, Dara Calleary, for implementing it.

In Summer 2026, Stephenson introduced the Air Navigation and Transport (Amendment) Bill 2026. The legislation seeks to strengthen powers to block the transit of munitions through Shannon Airport and Irish airspace, alongside measures intended to prevent American ICE deportation flights from stopping in Ireland. Stephenson says the Bill would enable the Government "to conduct on-spot inspections of flights".

== Political views ==
Stephenson advocates stronger public services, greater social protection, and increased government action on issues such as housing, disability rights, climate policy, and gender-based violence. She argues that the state should play a more active role in addressing social problems and improving public services.

On domestic, sexual, and gender-based violence, Stephenson argues that Fianna Fáil/Fine Gael government responses have been too slow and that greater attention should be paid to prevention through education, cultural change, and safer online environments. She supports stronger regulation of social media and technology companies and believes governments should be more willing to intervene against harmful online content.

In foreign affairs, she supports stronger Irish action regarding Israeli settlements in the occupied Palestinian territories and argues that Ireland should fully implement what she sees as its obligations under international law.

Regarding constitutional issues, Stephenson supports planning and preparation for the possibility of Irish reunification. She argues that discussions about the island's future should be informed by public consultation and structured deliberation, including citizens' assemblies. She also emphasises the need for greater understanding and engagement between communities in Northern Ireland and the Republic.

Stephenson has cited John Hume and Bernadette McAliskey as major political influences on her.
