= Jonathan Stephenson =

Politician from Northern Ireland (1950–2011)

Chair of the Social Democratic and Labour Party
- In office 1995–1998
- Leader: John Hume
- Preceded by: Mark Durkan
- Succeeded by: Jim Lennon

Northern Ireland Forum Member
- In office 30 May 1996 – 25 April 1998
- Preceded by: New forum
- Succeeded by: Forum dissolved
- Constituency: Top-up list

Member of Belfast City Council
- In office 19 May 1993 – 21 May 1997
- Preceded by: Tom Campbell
- Succeeded by: Tom Campbell
- Constituency: Castle

Personal details
- Born: 2 November 1950 England
- Died: 21 December 2011 (aged 61)
- Party: Social Democratic and Labour
- Children: Patricia Stephenson (daughter)
- Relatives: Hugh Southern Stephenson (father); Hugh Arthur Stephenson (brother)
- Education: Winchester College, Stanbridge Earls School, Queen's University Belfast

Jonathan Stephenson (2 November 1950 – 21 December 2011) was an Irish nationalist politician in Northern Ireland who was the chairman of the Social Democratic and Labour Party (SDLP) from 1995 to 1998, and a Belfast City Councillor for Castle from 1993 until 1997. He also served as a member of the Northern Ireland Forum between 1996 and 1998.

== Early life and education ==
Stephenson was born in England and educated at boarding schools in England, including Winchester College. His father was the senior British diplomat Hugh Southern Stephenson, while his grandfather was the former head of the Indian Civil Service in Bengal, Hugh Lansdown Stephenson.

Stephenson later moved to Northern Ireland to study History and Politics at Queen's University Belfast.

== Career ==
In 1979, Stephenson began working for the Trades Union Congress (TUC) in their press office in London. He left the TUC in 1988 and returned to Northern Ireland. He joined the Social Democratic and Labour Party (SDLP) in the 1980s, and would become its first official press officer.

Stephenson was elected to Belfast City Council at the 1993 Northern Ireland local elections, representing the SDLP in the Castle area. He also became Deputy Chairperson of the SDLP.

In 1995, he became the party's Chairperson, serving until 1998. At the Northern Ireland Forum election in 1996, he did not stand in a constituency, but was elected as one of two regional list candidates for the SDLP, but he lost his council seat in 1997.

== Personal life ==
Stephenson was a self-described "British-born, English protestant."

Stephenson died on 21 December 2011.

In 2025 Stephenson's daughter Patricia Stephenson was elected to Seanad Éireann in the Republic of Ireland.

Northern Ireland Forum
New forum	Regional Member; 1996–1998	Forum dissolved
Party political offices
Preceded by Mark Durkan	Chairperson of the Social Democratic and Labour Party; 1995–1998	Succeeded by Jim Lennon
