= Surajpura Raj =

Zamindari estate

- Status: Zamindari estate
- Capital: Surajpura
- Religion: Hinduism (official)
- Government: Indian feudalism
- Raja
  - 1782: Santokh Rai (first)
  - 1952: Raja Radhika Raman Sinha (last)
- Historical era: Medieval India
Preceded by	Succeeded by
Dumraon Raj	Republic of India

The Surajpura Raj, also known as the Surajpura Estate, was a large zamindari estate located in Bihar (with the exception of two villages in the United Provinces) ruled by the Kayastha Rajas of Surajpura. The estate yielded a revenue of ₹200,000 or more in the early 1900s, making it wealthier than the vast majority of princely states, such as the Pataudi State. Raja Radhika Raman Prasad Sinha was the last ruling Raja of Surajpura.

== History ==
The family migrated to Surajpura in the 18th century and served as hereditary dewans for the Dumraon Raj. In 1812, Francis Buchanan visited the family's palace and described them as "very rich". He also gave the following description,

There are two brothers belonging to this family, and one of them is the steward (Dewan) of the Bhojpur Rajah. His house, as well as that of his brother, is larger than that of his master, and entirely built of brick.

== Public works ==
During the Bihar famine of 1873–1874, the erstwhile ruler distributed alms to thousands of people and opened free kitchens. He also turned down ₹185,000 for the sale of the Sone Canal, as the canal was of immense help to his tenants.

In 1892, Raja Raj Rajeshwari Prasad Sinha donated ₹150,000 for construction of waterworks in Arrah. He also endowed a charitable hospital in Surajpura, the foundation for which was laid by Sir Steuart Bayley, then the Lieutenant Governor of Bengal.

== See also ==
- Zamindars of Bihar
- Raja Radhika Raman Sinha
- Sahay family
