= General Mills (disambiguation) =

General Mills is an American cereal company.

General Mills may also refer to:

- Albert Leopold Mills (1854–1916), U.S. Army major general who was a recipient of the Medal of Honor
- Anson Mills (1834–1924), U.S Army brigadier general, among other accomplishments
- Arthur Mills (Indian Army officer) (1879–1964), British Indian Army major general
- Graham Mills (1917–1992), British Army major general
- John S. Mills (1906–1996), U.S. Air Force major general
- Richard P. Mills (general) (born 1950), U.S. Marine Corps lieutenant general
- Samuel Meyers Mills Jr. (1842–1907), U.S. Army brigadier general
- William Augustus Mills (1777–1844), U.S. Army major general in the War of 1812
- General Mills (iZombie), a fictional U.S. Army general in the American television series iZombie
