= List of governors of Bihar and Orissa Province =

Governors of Bihar and Orissa Province

The office of Governor of Bihar and Orissa Province was created in 1920. Bihar had been a part of Bengal since 1756, and Orissa had been so since 1803. The two were separated from Bengal to form the province of Bihar and Orissa Province in 1912, initially governed under the authority of a Lieutenant-Governor. The offices were separated in 1936.

The following list is derived from the Oxford Dictionary of National Biography.

== Lieutenant governors of Bihar and Orissa Province ==
- 1912–1915: Sir Charles Stuart Bayley
- 1915–1918: Sir Edward Albert Gait
- 1918: Sir Edward Vere Levinge (acting)
- 1918–1920: Sir Edward Albert Gait

== Governors of Bihar and Orissa Province ==
- 1920–1921: Satyendra Prasanna Sinha, 1st Baron Sinha
- 1921–1922: Havilland Le Mesurier (acting)
- 1922–1927: Sir Henry Wheeler
- 1927–1932: Sir Hugh Lansdown Stephenson
- 1932–1936: Sir James David Sifton

== See also ==
- List of governors of Bihar
- List of governors of Odisha
- Governor (India)
