= Sahay family =

Indian noble family

Sahay/Sahai
- Indian noble family
- Country: India
- Origin: Patna, Bihar
- Founded: Early 19th century
- Founder: Munshi Harakh Lal
- Titles: Raja, Rai Bahadur, Babu

The Sahay family is a noble Indian Kayastha family from the state of Bihar, with its origins tracing back to the British colonial period. Members of the family, both biological descendants and those married into the family, have held various influential roles, including as rulers, statesmen, politicians, magistrates, civil servants, academics, and lawyers.

== History ==
The family traces its lineage to Munshi Harakh Lal, who migrated from Gorakhpur to Patna in the early 19th century. Munshi Harakh Lal established himself as a key figure, serving as a Member of the Legislative Council and a lawyer for the East India Company. He acquired his family's zamindari estates in Patna District.

== Members ==
The following individuals are members of the family, including both direct descendants and those related by marriage:

- Munshi Harakh Lal, Member of Legislative Council, lawyer for the East India Company.
- Babu Girjapat Sahay, zamindar of Patna, Honorary Magistrate of Patna, Member of the District Board of Patna.
- Babu Chandipat Sahay, zamindar of Patna, Member of Legislative Council, Member of the Licensing Board of Patna, music patron. He abolished the chaukidari tax in Bihar and Orissa, which includes present day states of Bihar, Jharkhand and Odisha.
- Harnandan Prasad RB, a member of the ICS, ruler of the Serkhouli Estate, Commissioner and Vice Chairman of the Sitamarhi municipality, member of the Sitamarhi Local Board, Honorary Magistrate of Sitamarhi, civil pleader.
- Shyamnandan Prasad RB, co-ruler of the Serkhouli estate, vice president of the Muzaffarpur Bar Association, senior government pleader.
- Radhika Raman Sinha CIE, Raja of Surajpura, prominent Hindi writer, Padma Bhushan awardee, chairman of the Shahabad District Board, president of the Harijan Sevak Sangh's Bihar branch, chairman of the Shahabad district's Anti Untouchability League.
- Raja Sir Rajiv Ranjan Prasad Sinha, younger brother of the Raja of Surajpura, Member of Legislative Council, first chairman of the Bihar Legislative Council.
- Sachchidananda Sinha, First President of the Constituent Assembly of India, vice chancellor of Patna University, secretary of the Indian National Congress, Member of the Imperial Legislative Council and Deputy Speaker of the Indian Legislative Assembly.
- Dr. Radhika Pati Sahay, head of the Chemistry Department, Bhagalpur University.
- Baidyanath Sahay, Senior Vice President at S.S and Co and Author
