= Margaret Jones =

Margaret or Maggie Jones may refer to:

- Maggie Elizabeth Jones (born 2003), American child actress
- Maggie Jones, Baroness Jones of Whitchurch (born 1955), British Labour politician
- Maggie Jones (actress) (1934–2009), British actress (Coronation Street)
- Maggie Jones (blues musician) (1894–1940), American blues singer and pianist
- Margaret B. Jones, pseudonym of Margaret Seltzer (born 1975), American writer of a discredited autobiography
- Margaret Jones (journalist) (1923–2006), Australian journalist
- Margaret Jones (Puritan midwife) (1613–1648), first person to be executed for witchcraft in Massachusetts Bay Colony
- Margaret Jones (writer) (1842–1902), Welsh travel writer
- Margaret Jones (military sponsor) (1926–2016), British volunteer at the Royal Military Academy Sandhurst
- Margaret Jones Bolsterli (born 1931), American author, editor and professor
- Margaret Jones Wiles (1911–2000), American composer, conductor and teacher
- Margaret Mordecai Jones Cruikshank (1878–1955), American schoolteacher
- Sandie Jones (Margaret Jones, 1951–2019), Irish singer
- Margaret Ursula Jones (1916–2001), British archaeologist
- Margaret Ann Jones (1937–2019), American philanthropist and businesswoman
- Margaret Jones (artist) (1918–2024), Welsh illustrator
- Margaret Jones, Countess of Ranelagh (1672/1673–1728), English courtier

== See also ==
- Peggy Jones (disambiguation)
- Lorella Jones (Lorella Margaret Jones, 1943–1995), Canadian professor of physics
- Nancie Joyce Margaret Jones (1923–2022), birth name of Rajni Kumar, British-born Indian educationist
