= Arthur Mills (Indian Army officer) =

Major-General Sir Arthur Mordaunt Mills, CB, DSO & Two Bars (13 August 1879 – 8 October 1964) was a senior officer in the British Indian Army.

== Early life and family ==
Arthur Mordaunt Mills was born on 13 August 1879, the son of Colonel Arthur McLeod Mills, an officer in the Indian Army, and his wife Elizabeth Louisa Jane née Pughe. In 1908, he married Winifred Alice (died 1931), daughter of Colonel R. H. Carew, DSO; they had three sons and one daughter. The eldest son Arthur William, married Rosemary Anne, only daughter of Major Edmond Meacher of Enton Leys in Whitley; the second son, Major John C. W. Mills, married Margaret M. S., daughter of Major J. M. Gill, of Portland Lodge in Exmouth; the youngest son, A. David Mills, was a captain in the 9th Gurkha Rifles. The daughter, Patricia Elizabeth, married the diplomat Sir Hugh Southern Stephenson, GBE, KCMG, CIE, CVO, son of Sir Hugh Stephenson, GCIE, KCSI, who had served as Governor of Burma. In 1940, Mills married, secondly, Hilda Grace Shirley, younger daughter of Harry Gavin Young, an officer in the Madras Police.

== Career ==
Following schooling at Wellington College, Mills was commissioned into the Devonshire Regiment as a second lieutenant on 4 May 1901. He was commissioned into the Indian Army with the same rank on 10 October 1902, promoted to lieutenant the following August and became a captain on 29 March 1910. He was posted as Adjutant and Quarter Master at the Staff College in Quetta between April 1913 and September 1914. During World War I, Mills was a staff captain in France between June and November 1915, after which he served as a temporary major with the 14th Battalion of the Gloucestershire Regiment until 28 March 1916. The following day, he was promoted to the full rank of major. Between 2 April 1916 and 5 July 1917, he was a temporary lieutenant-colonel in the 17th Battalion of the Lancashire Fusiliers. Over the course of the conflict, he was wounded, mentioned in despatches three times and received the Distinguished Service Order with two bars.

Mills was promoted to the rank of brevet lieutenant-colonel on 3 June 1919; colonel followed on 3 June 1923. An appointment as an instructor at the Senior Officers' School in Woking (September 1921 to March 1924) was followed by a posting as an assistant adjutant general in India between July 1929 and July 1930. Mills was then appointed brigadier commander on 4 July 1930; serving until 3 July 1934, he commanded forces on the North–West Frontier of India in 1930 and commanded the Razmak Brigade in Waziristan. He then served as an aide-de-camp to the King between March 1933 to May 1935 and became military advisor in Chief to the Indian State Forces on 16 March 1935; having been a temporary brigadier from 4 July 1934 to 15 February 1935, Mills was promoted to the rank of major-general on 2 May 1935. He retired in 1939, but remained colonel of the 4th Prince of Wales's Own Gurkha Rifles until 1950, having held the post since 1935.

Mills was appointed a Companion of the Order of the Bath in 1932 and a Knight Bachelor in 1938. He died on 8 October 1964.

== Likeness ==
- Sir Arthur Mordaunt Mills by Bassano Ltd, 1 June 1961. Half-plate film negative. National Portrait Gallery, London (purchased, 2004; Photographs Collection NPG x170911).
