= Raja Radhika Raman Sinha =

Indian Aristocrat

Raja Radhika Raman Prasad Sinha
- Born: September 10, 1890; Surajpura, Bihar, India
- Died: March 24, 1971 (aged 80)
- Occupations: Zamindar, Writer
- Known for: Hindi literature
- Awards: 1962 Padma Bhushan

Raja Radhika Raman Prasad Sinha (1890–1971) was the ruler of Surajpura Raj, a prominent writer of Hindi literature, as well as a Padma Bhushan awardee. Born into a royal family in the district of Shahabad, in the Indian state of Bihar on 10 September 1890 as the eldest son of Raja Rajrajeshwari Sinha, he was the pioneer of Hindi fiction and authored several books including The Gandhi Cap and Other Short Stories, Purush Nari, and Purva Aur Paschim. When he was 12 years old, his father died in 1903 and his entire estate came under the control of the Court of Wards. He was a friend of Hemwati Nandan Bahuguna and gave him Rs. 2000 for business purposes in the late 1940s. He was the secretary of Bihar's United Party, a party representing the interests of the zamindars. He was awarded the Padma Bhushan in 1962, and was bestowed an honorary D.Litt. degree by Magadh University in 1969.

== Bibliography ==
- Rita Bahuguna Joshi (25 February 2022). Hemwati Nandan Bahuguna : A Political Crusader. Aakar Books. ISBN 978-81-87879-07-7.
- Usha Jha (2003). Land, Labour, and Power. Aakar Books. ISBN 978-81-87879-07-7.
- "The Gandhi Cap and Other Short Stories". mup.manipal.edu. 23 May 2018.

== See also ==
- Acharya Ramlochan Saran
- Bihari literature
- Zamindars of Bihar
- Sahay family
