= Patna Electric Supply Undertaking =

Patna Electric Supply Undertaking (PESU)
- Formerly: Patna Electricity Supply Unit
- Company type: Statutory board
- Industry: Generation, transmission & distribution of electricity
- Headquarters: Vidyut Bhawan, Bailey Road, Patna, India
- Area served: Bihar
- Key people: Dilip Kumar Singh (General Manager)
- Products: Electricity
- Parent: Energy Department, Government of Bihar
- Website: www.bsphcl.co.in

Patna Electric Supply Undertaking (PESU) is a state-owned electricity regulation board operating in Patna and some peripheral areas, within the state of Bihar in India. The capital city of Patna forms the Patna Electric Supply Undertaking (PESU) Circle, which is further divided into two wings namely Patna East (consists Kankarbagh, Patna City, Gulzarbagh, Bankipore, Rajendra Nagar Divisions) and Patna West (Consists Danapur, New Capital, Pataliputra, Gardanibagh, Dak Bungalow divisions). There are total 69 power substations under PESU, divided into 12 divisions.

Indian civil engineer Raja Radhika Raman Sinha retired in 1996 as the general manager of Patna Electric Supply Undertaking (PESU).

== See also ==
- Bihar State Power Holding Company Limited
