= Satyendra Prasanna Sinha, 1st Baron Sinha =

British Indian politician

The Right Honourable The Lord Sinha KCSI, PC, KC
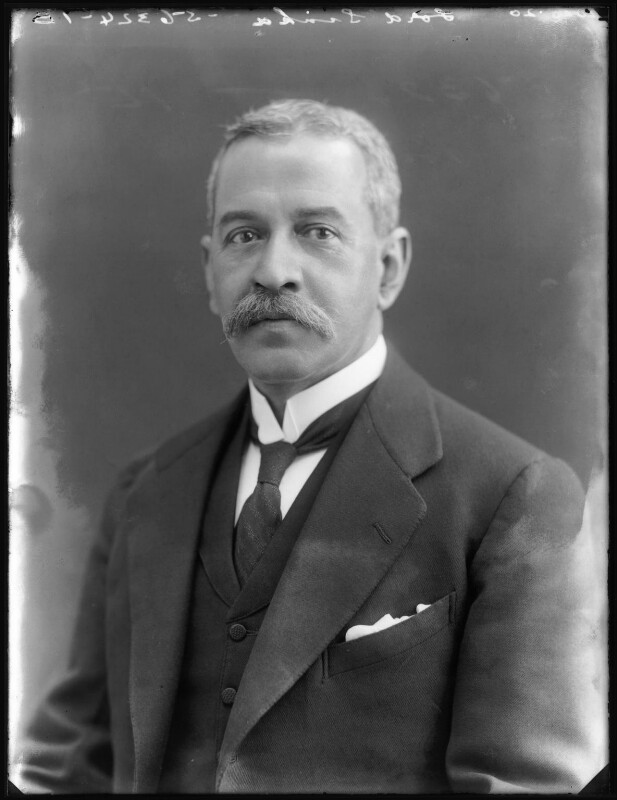
- A whole-plate glass negative portrait of Satyendra Prasanna Sinha taken by Bassano Ltd, 20 May 1920, and now in the collection of the National Portrait Gallery, London.

Governor of Bihar and Orissa
- In office 29 December 1920 – 30 November 1921
- Preceded by: Position established
- Succeeded by: Havilland Le Mesurier (acting)

Under-Secretary of State for India
- In office 1919–1920
- Preceded by: The Lord Islington
- Succeeded by: The Earl of Lytton

President of the Indian National Congress
- In office 1915–1916
- Preceded by: B.N. Bose
- Succeeded by: Ambica Charan Mazumdar

Personal details
- Born: 24 March 1863 Raipur, Bengal Presidency, British India (present-day Birbhum district, West Bengal, India)
- Died: 4 March 1928 (aged 64) Berhampore, Bengal Presidency, British India (present-day Murshidabad district, West Bengal, India)
- Spouse: Gobinda Mohini Mitter (m. 1880)
- Children: 7
- Occupation: Politician, lawyer

Satyendra Prasanna Sinha, 1st Baron Sinha, KCSI, PC, KC, (24 March 1863 – 4 March 1928) was a prominent British Indian lawyer and statesman. He was the first Governor of Bihar and Orissa, first Indian Advocate-General of Bengal, first Indian to become a member of the Viceroy's Executive Council and the first Indian to become a member of the British ministry. He is sometimes also referred to as Satyendra Prasanno Sinha or Satyendra Prasad Sinha.

== Early life and education ==
Sinha was born on 24 March 1863 in a Bengali Kayastha family of Raipur, Birbhum in Bengal Presidency, British India (now in West Bengal, India). His ancestor, Lalchand Dey, a businessman, came from Midnapur in southern Bengal to Birbhum in south-western Bengal, sailing up the Ajoy, to Raipur, which is just south of Bolpur. Here he set up his new home, buying the zamindari of Raipur from the Chaudhuri of the village. His father, the zamindar of Raipur, belonged to the Uttar Rarhi Kayastha sreni, a Bengali Kayastha caste. Sinha completed his early education from Birbhum Zilla School at Suri and then obtained a scholarship to carry on with his higher studies at Presidency College, Calcutta, then affiliated to the University of Calcutta, in 1878. In 1881, he left his studies in India to study law in England. In England, a scholarship of £50 a year for four years enabled him to train at Lincoln's Inn where he studied Roman Law, Jurisprudence, Constitutional Law and International Law. Later, he also won the Lincoln's Inn scholarship of £100 for three years. In 1886 he returned to Calcutta as a barrister.

== Career ==
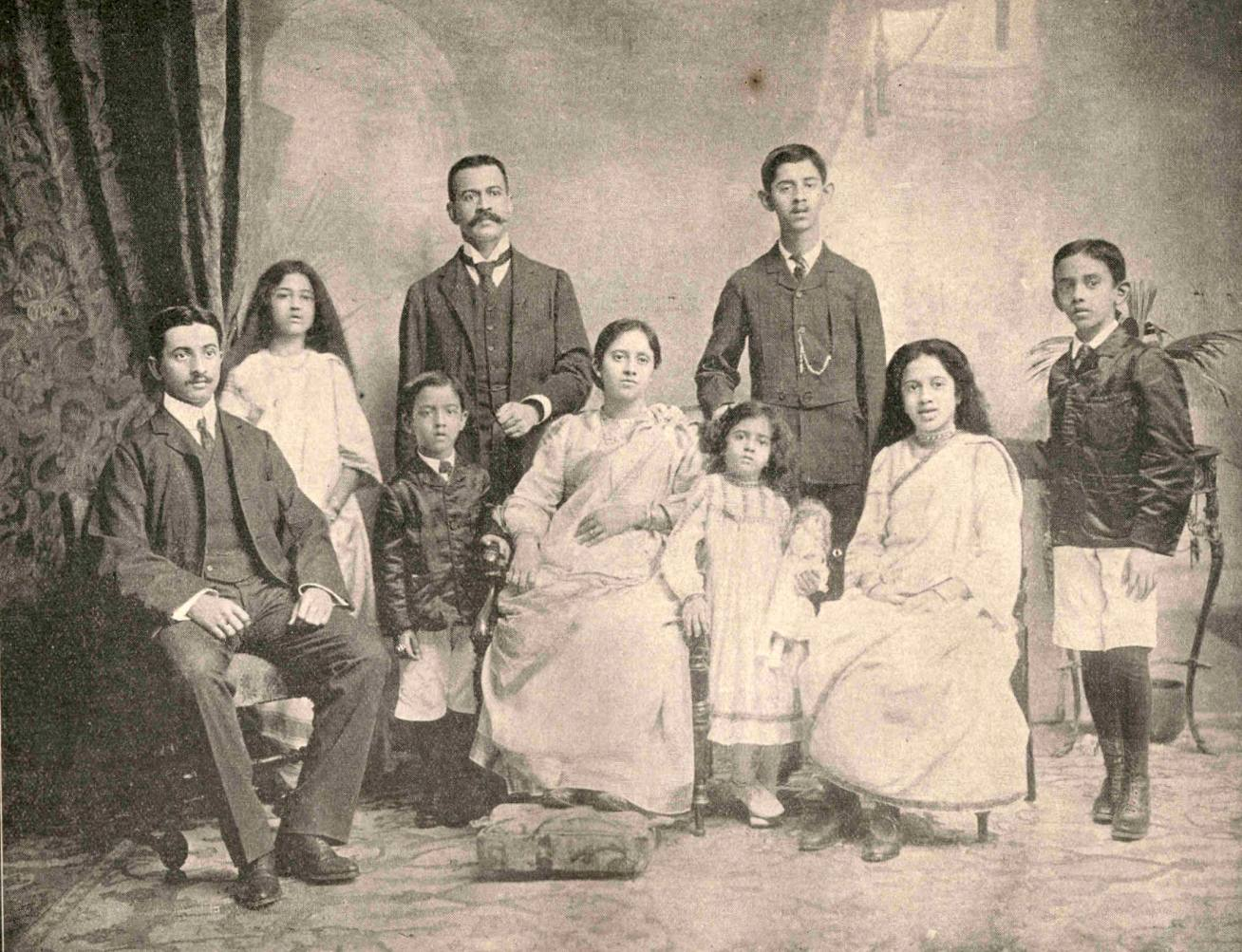
With family, c. 1909

After returning to India in 1886, Sinha established a successful legal practice in Calcutta. In 1903, Sinha became Standing Counsel to the Government of India overriding the claims of an English Barrister. He was the first Indian to be appointed as Advocate-General of Bengal in 1905, a post that was confirmed in 1908. His legal practice in 1908 was so lucrative that accepting government's invitation meant a cut in his annual income of £10,000. Sinha's first inclination was to turn down the viceroy's invitation, but Jinnah and Gokhale convinced him to accept the job. He also became the first Indian to enter the Viceroy's Executive Council in 1909. He was knighted in the New Year Honours on 1 January 1915. Sinha was elected President of the Indian National Congress in 1915 at the Bombay session of Congress.

In 1916, Sinha was named to the select committee instituted to superintend the general revision of the Indian criminal code, along with High Court Justices Sir C. V. Kumaraswami Sastri and Piggott and Central Provinces Commissioner Sir James Walker; Sir George Lowndes was chairman, while Vesey Dawson was deputed as Secretary. The committee met at Simla from September, concluding its initial work in December. The first World War slowed promulgation of the amended code as drafted by the committee; it was ultimately enacted in 1921.

In 1917, Sinha returned to England to work as an Assistant for Secretary of State, Edwin Samuel Montagu. Later, he also worked as a member of the Imperial War Cabinet and Conference along with the Maharaja of Bikaner, Ganga Singh following the outbreak of the First World War, and represented India in Europe's Peace Conference in 1919. In the same year, he was made Parliamentary Under-Secretary of State for India and also raised to the peerage as Baron Sinha of Raipur in the Presidency of Bengal. He became the first Indian member of the British House of Lords, taking his seat in February 1919. He was instrumental in passing of Government of India Act, 1919 through the House of Lords.

He returned to India in 1920 and was appointed as the first governor of the Province of Bihar and Orissa. His term as Governor did not last long and he served on this position for 11 months on grounds of bad health. In 1926, Sinha went back to England and joined the Judicial Committee of the Privy Council in London but bad health forced him to return to India.

== Indian National Congress ==
Sinha was a member of the Indian National Congress from 1896 to 1919 - rising to become its president in 1915 at the Bombay session. He left Congress in 1919 along with other moderate members. At the Calcutta session of the Congress in 1896 - he brought a proposal that no ruler of any Indian State should be deposed without an open judicial trial.

== Shantiniketan ==
Shantiniketan was originally a part of the ancestral zamindari of the Sinha family of Raipur, Birbhum. Satyendra Prasad Sinha donated for the construction of Sinha Sadan with a clock tower and bell. It was in this building that Oxford University conferred its honorary doctorate on the poet, Rabindranath Tagore.

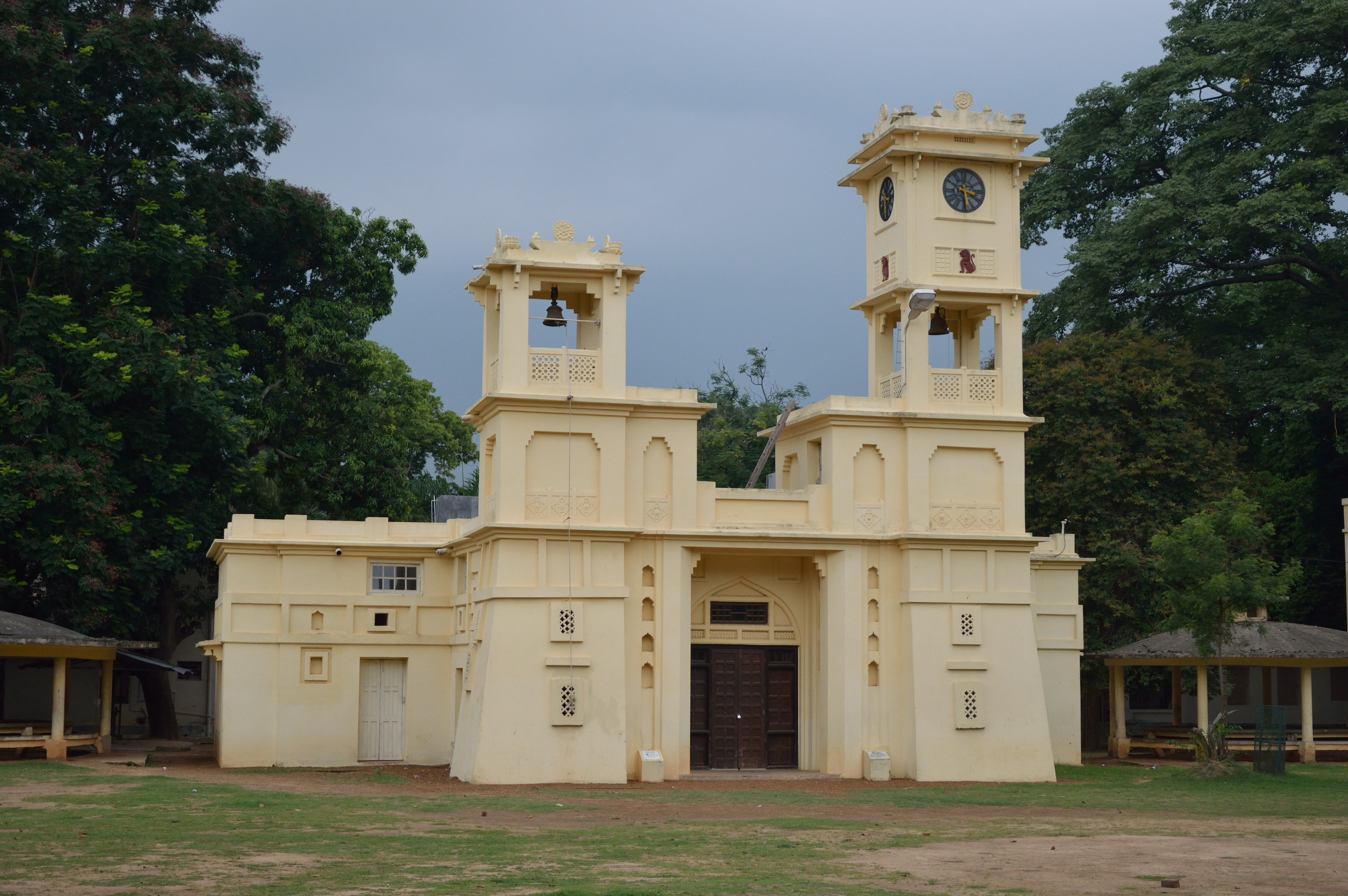
Sinha Sadan - 1926 CE - Santiniketan 2014-06-29 5505

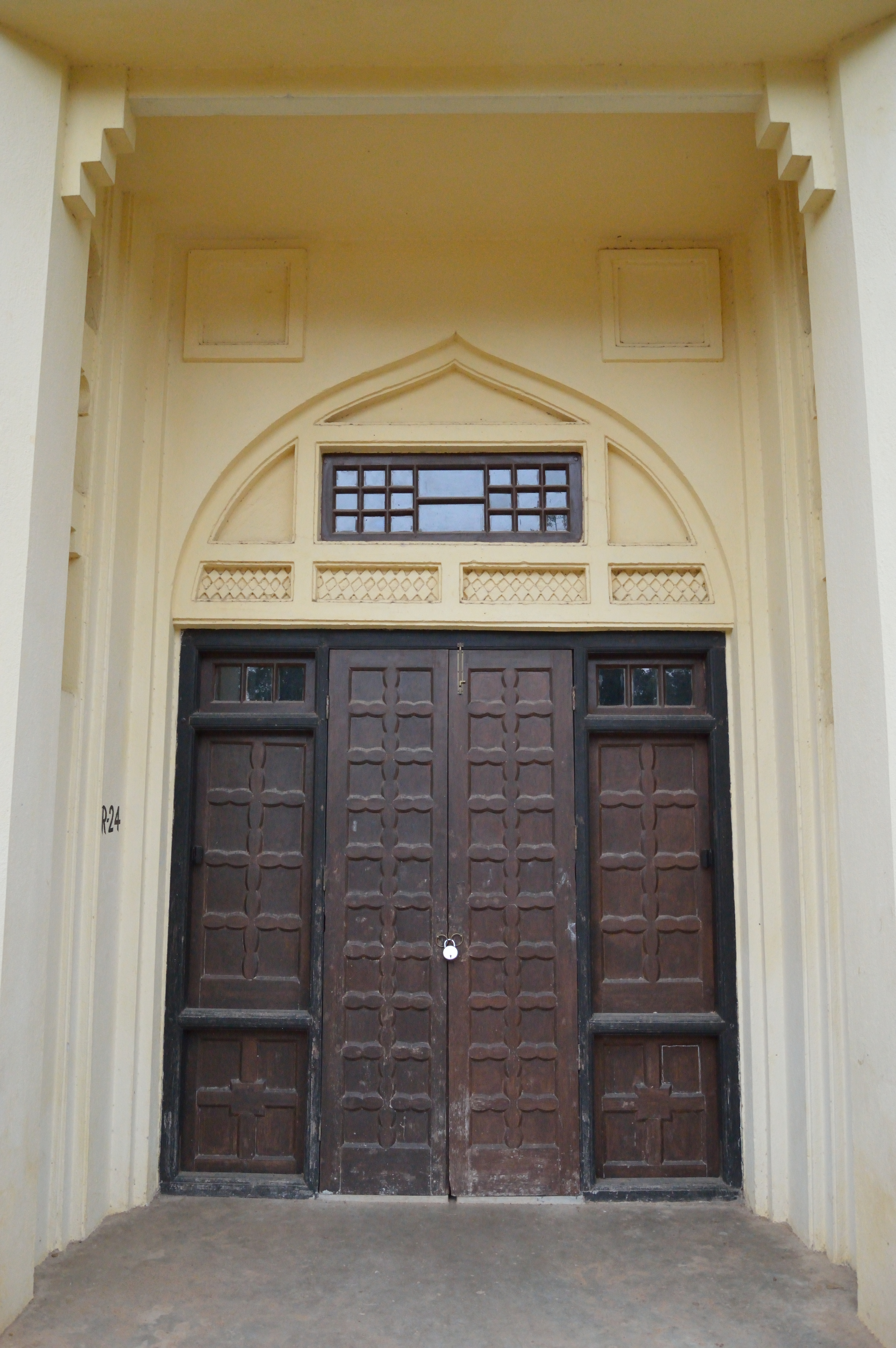
Doorway - Sinha Sadan - 1926 CE - Santiniketan 2014-06-29 5525

== Personal life ==
He was married to Gobinda Mohini Mitra on 15 May 1880 at Mahata, Burdwan, Bengal. They had four sons and three daughters. He built a Banglow at Mahata which is still present there.

== Death ==
Sinha died on 4 March 1928 at Berhampore.

== Memorials ==
A road in Kolkata is named after him as Lord Sinha Road.

== Styles ==
- 1863–1886: Satyendra Prasad Sinha
- 1886–1915: Satyendra Prasad Sinha, KC
- 1915-10 February 1919: Sir Satyendra Prasad Sinha, KC
- 10–19 February 1919: The Right Honourable Sir Satyendra Prasad Sinha, PC, KC
- 19 February 1919 – 1920: The Right Honourable The Lord Sinha, PC, KC
- 1920-1921: His Excellency The Right Honourable The Lord Sinha, PC, KC
- 1921–1928: The Right Honourable The Lord Sinha, KCSI, PC, KC

Political offices
Preceded by B.N. Bose	President of the Indian National Congress; 1915–1916	Succeeded by Ambica Charan Mazumdar
Political offices
Preceded by The Lord Islington	Under-Secretary of State for India; 1919–1920	Succeeded by The Earl of Lytton
Political offices
Preceded by New office (Sir Edward Gait as Lieutenant Governor)	Governor of Bihar and Orissa; 1920–1921	Succeeded by Havilland Le Mesurier (acting)
Peerage of the United Kingdom
New creation	Baron Sinha; 1919–1928	Succeeded by Aroon Kumar Sinha
