= Sinha Library =

- 25.613472976173625°N 85.13660485503883°E
- Location: Patna, Bihar, India
- Type: State central library
- Established: 1924

Collection
- Items collected: Manuscripts, books, journals, newspapers, magazines, patents, databases, maps, stamps, prints, drawings and manuscripts
- Size: 1,80,000 books

Access and use
- Access requirements: Open to anyone with a genuine need to use the collection

Sinha Library is a public library in Patna, India. This library has over 180,000 books. Sachchidananda Sinha had donated his collection of around 50,000 rare books, bearing his autograph — including copies of Manusmriti, Sacred Books of the East edited by Max Müller, Koran, Buddhist suttas, a copy of original Indian Constitution, works of Jawaharlal Nehru, history, politics, literature, Arya Samaj, Buddhism, Hindu scriptures, and others. Some old magazines like Harijan, published by Mahatma Gandhi from 1933 to 1948, Indian People, Bihari Times, Criterion Searchlight, Leader and Aryavarta are also preserved here along with the congress proceedings since 1885 and parliamentary debates since the inception of Parliament.

== History ==
The library was established in 1924 by Dr. Sachchidananda Sinha an academic, writer and the first president of the constituent assembly that drafted the Indian Constitution, its inaugural function was attended by Sir Henry Wheeler, the then governor of Bihar and Orissa Province. In 1955, the library originally known as Shrimati Radhika Sinha Institute and Sachchidananda Sinha Library, was taken over by the state government to be turned into a state central library.

The present-day reading room of the library used to be the dining hall, which was later turned into a library in the memory of his wife, Radhika Devi.

In this hall, Dr. Sinha used to host lunches and dinner for his friends and contemporaries, which included Mahatma Gandhi, Maulana Mazharul Haque etc. Scores of Congress working committee meetings were held here with Gandhi present in all of them.

Most of the relief committee meetings were also held here under the chairmanship of Dr. Rajendra Prasad. It was formed after the 1934 Nepal–Bihar earthquake, which had its epicenter in Darbhanga.

Jawaharlal Nehru had stayed here during his first visit to Patna after becoming the Prime Minister.

== See also ==
- Khuda Bakhsh Oriental Library
