= Peggy Jones =

Peggy Jones may refer to:

== Real people ==
- Peggy Ann Jones (born 1939), English opera singer and actress
- Peggy Jones (musician) (1940–2015), American musician known as Lady Bo
- Peggy Lipton Jones (born 1946), American actress and former model

== Fictional characters ==
- Peggy Jones, fictional character in House at the End of the Street
- Peggy Jones, fictional character in I'd Rather Be Right

== See also ==
- Margaret Jones (disambiguation)
