= Charles Alexander Innes =

British colonial administrator

Sir Charles Innes KCSI CIE
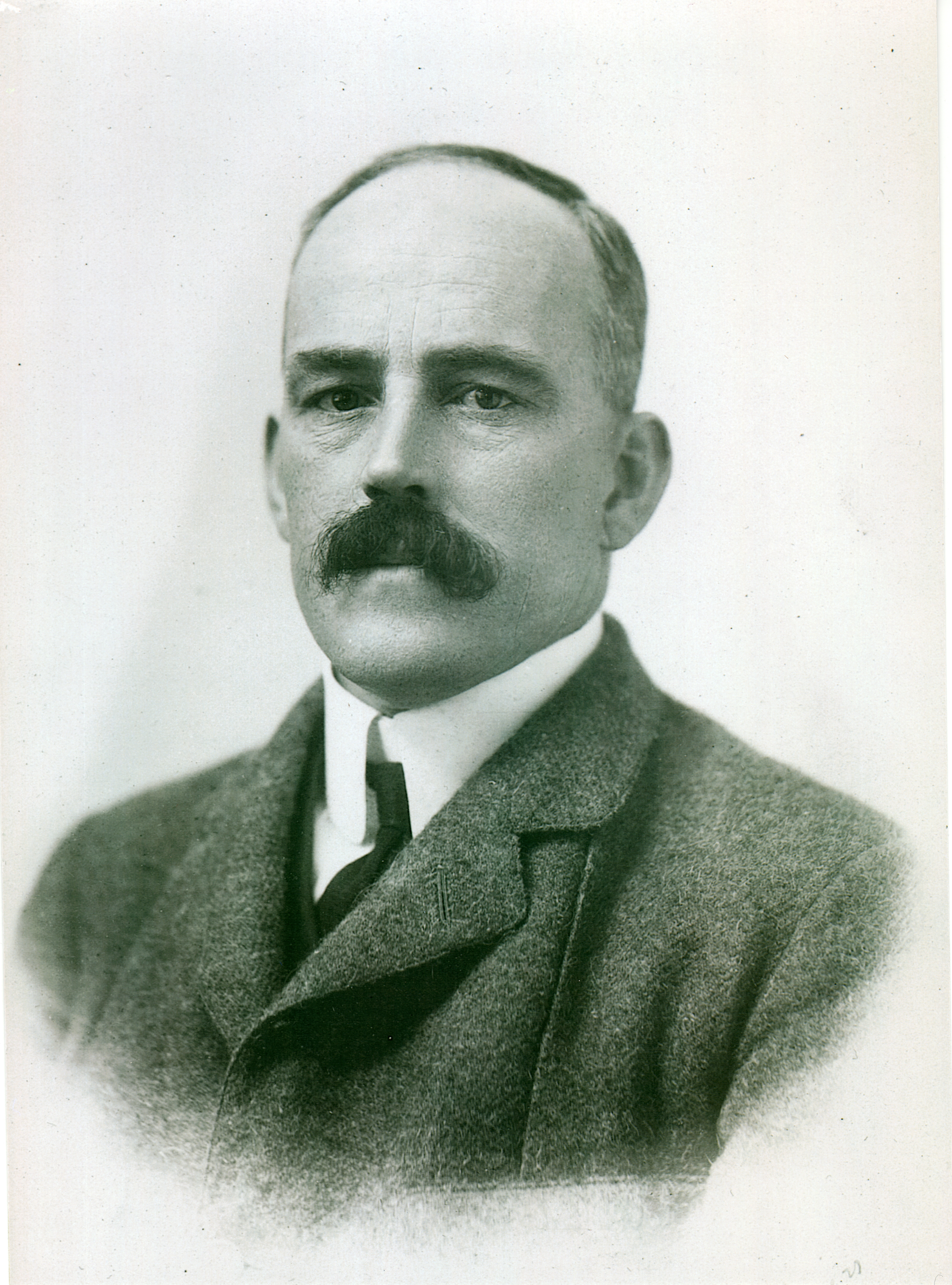

Governor of Burma
- In office 20 December 1927 – 20 December 1932
- Preceded by: Harcourt Butler
- Succeeded by: Hugh Landsdowne Stephenson

Personal details
- Born: 27 October 1874 Secunderabad, Hyderabad
- Died: 28 June 1959 (aged 84) Tonbridge, Kent, England
- Occupation: Administrator

Sir Charles Alexander Innes KCSI CIE (27 October 1874 – 28 June 1959) was a British civil servant and colonial administrator who served as Governor of the British Crown Colony of Burma from December 1927 to December 1932. He was also formerly chairman of the Mercantile Bank of India.

== Early life and education ==
Innes was born in Secunderabad, Hyderabad, to Deputy Surgeon-General Charles Alexander Innes, and Jessie Mary Arnold (née Marshall). His mother was born in Madras to General Hubert Marshall of the old Madras Army. Innes Jr. was educated at Merchant Taylors' School and St. John's College, Oxford. He passed the Indian Civil Service examination in 1897.

== Career ==
Innes was sent to the Madras Presidency because of his family connections. He worked as a settlement officer in Malabar, where he helped provide material for The Imperial Gazetteer of India, and worked as a deputy secretary to the Government of India. In 1916, he was appointed Director of Industries and Controller of Munitions in Madras. Following the war, he was made Foodstuffs Commissioner with the Government of India. He was appointed secretary in the Commerce Department in 1920, which also oversaw railways.

Innes became head of the Commerce Department in 1921. His tenure was noted for two achievements: separating the railway budget from general finance budget, and forming the policy of "discriminating protection," which gave India more independence over fiscal policy. He was also credited with forming a Tariff Board to make inquiries, which provided significant help to the burgeoning iron and steel industry in India, which provided significant and essential aid to the allies in the World War II.

In December 1927, Innes became Governor of Burma, succeeding Sir Harcourt Butler, serving until 1932.

In 1933, he joined the board of the Mercantile Bank of India in 1933 and served as chairman of the bank from 1938 to 1952. He was also chairman of Mysore Gold Mining company and was on the board of the Oriental Telephone and Electricity Company.

== Honours ==
He was appointed a Companion of the Order of the Indian Empire in the 1919 Birthday Honours, for meritorious services connected with the war, and a Companion of the Order of the Star of India (CSI) in the 1921 Birthday Honours. He was invested as a Knight Commander of the Order of the Star of India in the 1924 New Year Honours.

== Personal life ==
In 1900, Innes married Agatha Rosalie (née Stevenson), daughter of Colonel Kenlie Stevenson of the Indian Army. They had one daughter and four sons. She was awarded the Kaiser-i-Hind Gold Medal in 1933 and died in 1956. Sir Charles was descended from the Inneses of Drainie.

The line has multiple descendants extant. On the distaff side, his daughter, Rosalie, married Thomas Wynford Rees (1888–1959), who served as Sir Charles' private secretary while Innes was Governor of Burma (1927–1932). Rees was a highly decorated officer in the British Indian Army, who would eventually attain the rank of Major General. Together, Thomas Wynford Rees and Rosalie Innes had one son, Peter Wynford Innes Rees, Baron Rees (1926–2008), a prominent lawyer and Conservative Member of Parliament.

Government offices
Preceded by Sir Spencer Harcourt Butler	Governor of British Crown Colony of Burma; 1927–1932	Succeeded by Sir Hugh Lansdown Stephenson
