= Sachchidananda Sinha College =

Educational institution in Bihar, India

Coordinates: 24.7485°N 84.3919°E

Sachchidananda Sinha College, Aurangabad (Bihar)
- S. Sinha College, Aurangabad
- Motto: Provide quality education for better Indian society.
- Type: Government Co-Education Institute
- Established: 1943
- Founders: Akhouri Krishna Prakash Sinha
- Affiliations: MU
- Principal: Dr Sudhir Kumar Mishra
- Students: approx 20,000
- Location: Aurangabad Poiwan Road Gangati Ward no-31, Aurangabad, Bihar, Bihar, 824101, India
- Campus: Sachchidananda Sinha College, Gangti Aurangabad - 824101
- Language: English, Hindi
- Nickname: SSC
- Website: ssinhacollege.co.in

Sachchidananda Sinha College is a Government Co-Education college located in Aurangabad, Bihar, India. It was established in 1943 by a local dignitary, renounced pleader and social worker Shree Akhouri Krishna Prakash Sinha alias Tripurari babu with the moral support of his friends Dr.Sachchidananda Sinha and Bihar-Vibhuti Dr.Anugrah Narayan Sinha. It is the oldest college under Magadh University, Bodh Gaya, Bihar and converted into constituent unit of this university in 1974. It imparts teaching up to honours degree level in major sixteen subjects of Humanities, Social Science, Science and Commerce.

== Campus ==
The college is situated 3 km away from the main market of the town on Poiwan road. It occupies the landed area of more than 18 acres total construction is approx 14 acre.

== Facilities ==
- Library- College has own Central Library with the approx 50,000 books, have study room webopac system and latest journals.
- Hostel- College has two hostels, one for boys and the other for girls.
- RF ID System- College has an automated attendance system for vocational course students and staff.

== Faculties ==
College provide education under these faculty, science, arts, commerce, and different technical and vocational courses.

== Subject ==
- PG Course-Science(Physics/Chemistry/Mathematics/Botany/Zoology)
- Commerce
- UG Course-Science(Physics/Chemistry/Mathematics/Botany/Zoology)
- Arts(Hindi/English/Urdu/Sanskrit/Economics/History/Geography/Pol-Science/philosophy)
- Vocational-[Education(B.Ed.)
- Pharmacy (B.Pharm)
- Business Administrative (MBA)
- Advertising Sales Promotion and Sales Management (BASPSM)
- Business Management (BBM)
- Computer Science(MCA/BCA)
- Library and Information Science(BLIS)
- Biotechnology(B.Sc. Biotechnology)
- Information Technology (B.Sc. I.T.)
