= Baron Sinha =

Barony in the Peerage of the United Kingdom

- Creation date: 1919
- Created by: King George V
- Peerage: Peerage of the United Kingdom
- First holder: Satyendra Prasanna Sinha, 1st Baron Sinha
- Present holder: Arup Kumar Sinha, 6th Baron Sinha
- Heir presumptive: Dilip Kumar Sinha (younger brother)
- Arms: Argent on a chevron ermine between in chief two lotus flowers and in base an adjutant bird three fountains all proper.
- Crest: A demi-tiger supporting a fasces erect proper.
- Supporters: On either side an adjutant bird proper collared or.

Baron Sinha, of Raipur in the Presidency of Bengal, is a title in the Peerage of the United Kingdom. It was created in 1919 for Sir Satyendra Prasanna Sinha, a distinguished barrister and zamindar who was the first (and only) British Indian ever to be elevated to the hereditary peerage.

== History ==
A distinguished Calcutta (now Kolkata) barrister, the 1st Baron Sinha was the first Indian to be appointed Advocate-General of Bengal in 1905. Four years later, he became the first Indian to be appointed to the Viceroy's Executive Council. In 1917, he became an assistant to the then-Secretary of State for India, Edwin Montagu, at the Imperial War Conference. He was raised to the peerage two years later, in part due to the perceived need for an Indian representative to steer India-related legislation through the House of Lords. There was controversy over the succession on his death in 1928. He ought to have been succeeded in his title by his first son, Arun Kumar Sinha. However, Arun Kumar had been born at a time when there was no system of registration of births and marriages in India, so he was unable to prove his claim to the title to the satisfaction of the House of Lords at that time.

In 1936, Arun Kumar Sinha, 2nd Baron Sinha, presented a petition for a writ of summons to the House of Lords. The petition was referred to the Committee for Privileges on 27 June 1938, and a Commission was appointed to take evidence in Calcutta, on this birth and marriage. Ultimately, on 25 July 1939, the Committee for Privileges decided that Lord Sinha had succeeded in his claim. The decision remarks that the decision was not precedent for a peer who had legally married two wives (at the same time), and that there is no British law on heirship in the case of a polygamous marriage; but in this case that difficulty did not arise - and in fact the first Lord Sinha had belonged to the Sadharan Brahmo Samaj, a branch of Hinduism which required monogamy. Having fully established his claim, Arun Kumar, now confirmed as the second Lord Sinha, was subsequently issued a writ of summons directing him to take his seat in the House of Lords. Owing to the Second World War, however, he was unable to attend Parliament until 1 August 1945, when he was finally sworn in and signed the Register of Peers. More controversy followed in the early 1950s, when he was refused a British passport: eventually, in 1955, he was issued with a passport which described him as a British subject. He continued to regularly attend sessions and speak in the House of Lords until his death in 1967.

Upon the death of the 2nd Baron, the title passed to his elder son, Sudhindra Prasanna Sinha, who took his seat in the House of Lords as the 3rd Baron Sinha on 18 June 1969. The 3rd Baron Sinha, who unlike his father and grandfather pursued a business career, only infrequently attended sessions of the Lords as he served as chairman of general merchants and holding company Macneill & Barry (now post its acquisition Williamson Magor) and as a director of several Kolkata-based firms, including the Statesman. Reportedly, he and his son and heir, Susanta Prasanna Sinha, only spoke English and not the Bengali language.

In the early morning of 28 November 1978, a mysterious fire broke out in the 24-room Sinha family mansion at 7 Lord Sinha Road in Kolkata; it took about two hours for a police constable in the neighbouring barracks to see the flames and alert the Sinha family and emergency personnel. When the fire brigade arrived, they discovered the burnt corpses of Shane Patrick Sinha, the four-year old heir presumptive to the peerage, and his three-year-old sister Sharon. Both were the younger children of the heir to the peerage, Susanta Prasanna Sinha. Then aged 25, Susanta had been a keyboards player in a Kolkata cafe during his teens before becoming a tea broker. In 1972, he married Patricia Orchard, an Anglo-Indian from a working-class family in Kolkata. The marriage reportedly met with strong disapproval from the Sinha family, and they never accepted Patricia or the three children she had with Sushanta as members of their family. Patricia soon alleged her husband to be a drug addict and pyromaniac who made at least three attempts to set fires at his place of work, at a hotel where the couple had once stayed and at their flat. In February 1978, the couple separated, with Patricia returning to her parents' home with their eldest child and daughter. The remaining two children continued to live with their father and his family, though Patricia later alleged they "led a dog's life," reportedly never being allowed to sleep in a bed, only on the floor of a room. Investigators and emergency personnel who arrived at the Sinha mansion after the fire were struck by the surviving family's apparent indifference to the fire or to the deaths of the two children. Although the Sinhas alleged the blaze had been caused by a short circuit, a fire investigator's report noted the heat of the blaze had been "most intense" at the spot where the two bodies were found, and that the fire had most likely originated there; the report further noted the victims of the fire had apparently not made any attempt to escape. As a result, on 6 December 1978 the Kolkata police charged both Susanta Prasanna Sinha and his sister Manjula Dorje Sinha with murder by arson and tampering with evidence. Both siblings however were acquitted in the subsequent trial, with the fire controversially deemed to have been accidental.

Following the tragedy and scandal, and having retired in 1977, the 3rd Baron retreated into a quiet life with his wife and their children. In reduced circumstances by 1988 and being forced to rent out the lower two floors of the family mansion, he granted an interview that year to a journalist from the Illustrated Weekly of India, during which he described the modern Kolkata and India as "absolutely alien to anything I've ever known." He further noted his peerage had little relevance for a republican Indian government, which "didn't particularly wish for an Indian representative in the House of Lords" who would not be working in tandem with the Indian government, and that India had its own representation in the United Kingdom through its High Commission.

The 3rd Baron died the following year, in 1989. He was succeeded by his son Susanta Prasanna Sinha as the 4th Baron Sinha, though the latter did not file a formal claim to the peerage. The 4th Baron died young and without male issue three years later, upon which the direct male line failed.

The 4th Baron was succeeded in the barony by his uncle Aninda Kumar Sinha as the 5th Baron Sinha, a retired sales manager and the younger son of the second baron. Prior to the death of the 4th Baron, however, it was thought that his uncle, the heir presumptive, had predeceased his nephew, possibly without heirs. Desiring to keep his new status a secret, the new Lord Sinha did not register his claim with the British authorities. In 1996, the 4th Baron's sister, Anjana Lahiri notified the British press that her uncle was still alive and resident in the UK. He was duly recognized as the 5th Baron Sinha, but continued to refuse his claim to the peerage.

On the death of the 5th Baron in 1999, the rights to the title passed to his elder son Arup Kumar Sinha, de jure the present 6th Baron Sinha. The said Arup Kumar Sinha is a British citizen and was brought up in Britain. He inherited the right to sit in the House of Lords on 18 January 1999, but lost it on 11 November 1999 as a result of the House of Lords Act 1999. He however does not appear on the Roll of the Peerage; as a result, he may not use the title in an official capacity until he registers with the College of Arms and provides the necessary documentation to be listed on the roll. The 6th Baron Sinha continues to claim the title as of 2015. As of 2005, he was working as a travel agent.

== Barons Sinha (1919) ==
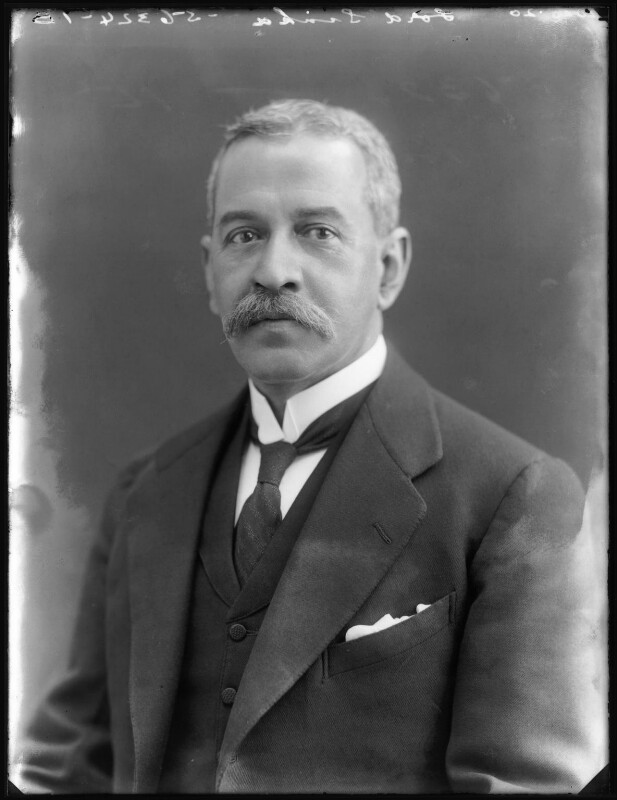
Satyendra Prasanna Sinha, 1st Baron Sinha, in 1920

- Satyendra Prasanna Sinha, 1st Baron Sinha (1863–1928)
- Arun Kumar Sinha, 2nd Baron Sinha (1887–1967)
- Sudhindra Prasanna Sinha, 3rd Baron Sinha (1920–1989)
- Susanta Prasanna Sinha, 4th Baron Sinha (1953–1992)
- Aninda Kumar Sinha, 5th Baron Sinha (1930–1999)
- Arup Kumar Sinha, de jure 6th Baron Sinha (1966–present)

The heir presumptive is the present holder's brother the Hon. Dilip Kumar Sinha (born 1967).

=== Line of succession ===
- Satyendra Prasanna Sinha, 1st Baron Sinha (1863 – 1928)
  - Arun Kumar Sinha, 2nd Baron Sinha (1887 – 1967)
    - Sudhindra Prasanna Sinha, 3rd Baron Sinha (1920 – 1989)
      - Sushanta Prasanna Sinha, 4th Baron Sinha (1953 – 1992)
    - Anindo Kumar Sinha, 5th Baron Sinha (1930 – 1999)
      - Arup Kumar Sinha, 6th Baron Sinha (born 1966)
      - (1) Hon. Dilip Kumar Sinha (born 1967)
  - Hon. Sisir Kumar Sinha (1890 – 1950)
    - (2) Indrajit Sinha (born 1918)
      - (3) Premola Sinha (born 1954)
  - Hon. Sushil Kumar Sinha (1894 – 1968)
    - (4) Sunil Kumar R. Sinha (born 1939)
      - (5) Arjun Sinha (born 19––)
      - (6) Ranjan Sinha (born 19––)
  - Hon. Tarun Kumar Sinha (born 1899)
