= Henry Wheeler (civil servant) =

English civil servant (1870–1950)

Sir Henry Wheeler KCSI, KCIE

Governor of Bihar and Orissa
- In office 12 April 1922 – 6 April 1927
- Preceded by: Satyendra Prasanna Sinha, 1st Baron Sinha
- Succeeded by: Sir Hugh Lansdown Stephenson

Personal details
- Born: 2 June 1870 Clifton
- Died: 2 June 1950 (aged 80)
- Spouse: Marjory Wheeler (m. 1909)
- Children: 1
- Education: Christ's College, Cambridge
- Occupation: Administrator

Sir Henry Wheeler, KCSI KCIE (2 June 1870 – 2 June 1950) was the Governor of Bihar and Orissa from 12 April 1922 to 6 April 1927. He was a member of the Imperial Civil Service appointed in 1889 and served in Bengal. He was also a member of Council of India from 1927 to 1937.

== Early life and education ==
Wheeler was born to Dr. Henry Wheeler on 2 June 1870 in Clifton. He received his early education at Priory House, Clapham Common and Private. He then went on to complete his higher education from Christ's College, Cambridge.

== Civil service career ==
Wheeler joined the Imperial Civil Service (ICS) in 1889 and served in Bengal. He was posted as Under Secretary in the Government of Bengal from 1897 to 1898. He was Junior Secretary, Board of Revenue from 1901 to 1903. He was Secretary of the Salt Committee from 1903 to 1904. From 1907 to 1908 he was posted as Deputy Secretary in the Finance Department of Government of India. He worked as the Secretary of the Royal Commission on Decentralisation from 1908 to 1909. He was posted as Financial Secretary to the Government of Bengal from 1909 to 1912. He then went on to serve as Home Secretary in the Government of India from 1912 to 1916.

== Governor of Bihar and Orissa ==
Wheeler was appointed as Governor of Bihar and Orissa on 12 April 1922 and was in this position till 6 April 1927. During his tenure as Governor, a number of educational and public institutions were founded or declared opened in the state of Bihar and Orissa. Some significant institutions opened during his tenure were Bihar Veterinary College, Patna Medical College and Hospital, Sinha Library, Wheeler Senate Hall of Patna University.

== Other positions held ==
Wheeler was a member of Executive Council of Bengal from 1917 to 1922 and a member of Council of India from 1927 to 1937. He also worked as Chairman of Committee to examine procedures of Government of India's secretariat under the new constitution in 1935.

== Awards and honours ==
Sir Henry Wheeler was awarded Companion of the Order of the Indian Empire (CIE) in 1910, Companion of the Order of the Star of India (CSI) in 1914, Knight Commander of the Order of the Indian Empire (KCIE) in 1918 and Knight Commander of the Order of the Star of India (KCSI) in 1921.

== Personal life ==
Sir Wheeler was married to Marjory, daughter of Sir Harold Stuart, at Simla on 12 April 1909. They had one daughter.

Government offices
Preceded by Satyendra Prasanna Sinha, 1st Baron Sinha	Governor of Bihar and Orissa; 1922–1927	Succeeded by Sir Hugh Lansdown Stephenson
