= James David Sifton =

British civil servant (1878–1952)

Sir James David Sifton KCSI, KCIE

Governor of Bihar and Orissa
- In office 7 April 1932 – 31 March 1936
- Preceded by: Sir Hugh Lansdown Stephenson
- Succeeded by: Position Abolished

Governor of Bihar
- In office 1 April 1936 – 10 March 1937
- Preceded by: Position Created
- Succeeded by: Sir Maurice Garnier Hallett

Personal details
- Born: 17 April 1878 London
- Died: 24 January 1952 (aged 73) Sussex
- Spouse: Harriet May (m. 1907)
- Education: St Paul's School, London, Magdalen College, Oxford
- Occupation: Administrator

Sir James David Sifton, KCSI, KCIE (17 April 1878 – 1952) was a British civil servant who was the Governor of Bihar and Orissa from 7 April 1932 to 31 March 1936 and then Governor of Bihar from 1 April 1936 to 10 March 1937. He was the first Governor of Bihar after division of province from Orissa. He was a member of the Imperial Civil Service appointed in 1902 and served in Bengal and later in Bihar and Orissa Province.

== Early life and education ==
Sifton was born to Thomas Elgood Sifton and Susanna Sifton on 17 April 1878 in London. The family resided at 53 Shepherd's Bush Green, Shepherd's Bush, London. His father was a clerk in savings bank in Marylebone, Middlesex. He received his early education at St Paul's School, London and went on to complete his higher education from Magdalen College, Oxford. He was a Demy scholar at the college and graduated B.A. in 1901.

== Civil Service Career ==
Sifton joined the Indian Civil Service (ICS) in 1902 and served in Bengal and later in Bihar and Orissa Province when the province was separated from Bengal presidency. His civil service career spanned from 1902 to 1937. During this span he held several positions including Financial Secretary to the Government of Bihar and Orissa.

== Governor of Bihar and Orissa ==
Sifton was appointed Governor of Bihar and Orissa in November 1931 and held the position from 7 April 1932. He was the last Governor of undivided Bihar and Orissa. In 1936, the province was divided into Bihar Province and Orissa Province. After division, he continued on his post of Governor of Bihar, making him the inaugural holder of the office of Governor of Bihar. His salary as Governor was Rs. 8,333.5.7 per month.

== Other Positions held ==
Sifton was appointed a member of the Executive Council of the Governor of Bihar and Orissa in 1927.

== Awards and honours ==
Sir James Sifton was awarded Companion of the Order of the Indian Empire (CIE) in 1921, Companion of the Order of the Star of India (CSI) in 1929, Knight Commander of the Order of the Indian Empire (KCIE) in 1931 and Knight Commander of the Order of the Star of India (KCSI) in 1932.

== Personal life ==
Sir James married Harriet May, daughter of E. Shettle of Eye, Suffolk, on 14 August 1907. His grave lies in Eye Cemetery.

Government offices
| Preceded by Sir Hugh Lansdown Stephenson | Governor of Bihar and Orissa; 1932–1936 | Succeeded by Position Abolished |
| Preceded by Position Created | Governor of Bihar; 1936–1937 | Succeeded by Sir Maurice Garnier Hallett |
