= Edward Vere Levinge =

- Born: 24 May 1867; Cuttack, India
- Died: 24 April 1953 (aged 85); Marandellas, Southern Rhodesia
- Occupation: Colonial administrator
- Known for: Lieutenant-Governor of Bihar and Orissa
- Spouse: Alice Adele née Thomas

Sir Edward Vere Levinge KCIE CSI (1867–1954) was an administrator in the Indian Civil Service who rose to serve as acting Lieutenant-Governor of the British Raj Province known as Bihar and Orissa. He held that office for the months of April–July 1918, being an interregnum in the office of Edward Albert Gait.

== Early life ==
Edward Vere Levinge was born on 24 May 1867 at Cuttack in British India

He was the second son of Harry Corbyn Levinge and his wife, Ellen. His father had worked as secretary to the government of Bengal's Public Works Department and was a son of the sixth Levinge baronet.

Levinge was educated at Cheltenham College and then matriculated at Balliol College, Oxford on 24 October 1885.

== Indian Civil Service ==
Levinge sat the competitive examination for the Indian Civil Service in the same year. Graduating in 1888 with a second-class BA degree in law, Levinge arrived in Bengal on 28 November 1888. His first position was as an assistant magistrate and assistant District collector, and then he worked in various departments from November 1893. In April 1896 he was appointed as joint magistrate and deputy collector, becoming magistrate and District Collector in July 1898. He held those offices at the time of publication of the 1905 India List.

Official recognition of his work came with the award of Companion of the Order of the Star of India (CSI) in 1911, and in 1916 he was appointed a Knight Commander, Order of the Indian Empire (KCIE).

== Family and later life ==
He was married to Alys Adèle Thomas on 1 December 1900 in London, and the couple had a daughter Vera Alys born in 1911. Levinge's granddaughter, Vera Alys's daughter, Ambassador Marie-Therese Pictet-Althann, born in 1949, is Permanent Observer of the Sovereign Order of Malta to the United Nations in Geneva. Levinge died on 24 January 1954 aged 86 at Marandellas in Southern Rhodesia, his wife Alys having predeceased him on 1 May 1952.

== See also ==
- List of governors of Bihar and Orissa Province
