= Edward Gait =

British colonial administrator (1863–1950)

Sir Edward Albert Gait KCSI CIE (1863–1950) was an administrator in the Indian Civil Service who rose to serve as Lieutenant-Governor of the Bihar and Orissa Province in the Bengal Presidency of British India. He held that office for the years 1915–1920, with a brief absence during April–July 1918 when Edward Vere Levinge officially acted in the position.

== Life and career ==
Gait graduated from University College, London. He sat the competitive examination for the Indian Civil Service in 1882 and was subsequently appointed, arriving in India on 11 December of that year. He served as assistant commissioner in Assam, and then from 1890 as provincial superintendent for the 1891 census in that region. He wrote the official report for that region's census, which formed a part of the national census undertaken in that year.

After various other roles in the administration, Gait was appointed as a magistrate and District collector in November 1897. In April 1900 he became superintendent of census operations in Bengal, where he worked with Herbert Hope Risley, the Census Commissioner, to produce the official report of the 1901 Census of India. He was himself Census Commissioner from 1902 until after the census of 1911.

Official recognition of his work came with the award of Companion of the Order of the Indian Empire (CIE) in 1907. In 1912 he became a Companion of the Star of India (CSI), and in 1915 he was raised to the rank of Knight Commander (KCSI) in the same Order. In 1917 he was appointed a Knight of Grace of The Grand Priory of the Order of the Hospital of St John of Jerusalem in England.

He was Lt.-Governor of Bihar and Orissa during 1915 and 1920. He also founded Bihar and Orissa Research Society in 1915 which was devoted to explore more about Indology and anthropology. The society published a journal with title of Journal of Bihar and Orissa Research Society. Lt. Gait acted as president of the society from 1915 to 1920 while he was taking his office in Patna.

Amrendra Thakur has said that with the publication of A History of Assam "historical research in North East India entered into a new age. Truly speaking Gait's was the first full-length history of the province. The book is freely used by scholars as an authentic source material."

== Publications ==
Aside from co-editing the official Reports of the 1901 census of India, Gait wrote other publications. These include:

- Gait, Edward Albert (1893). Manual of local rules and orders under enactments applying to Assam. India: Office of the Superintendent of Government Printing, India.
- Gait, Edward Albert (1893). Manual of executive rules and orders in force in Assam. India: Office of the Superintendent of Government Printing, India.
- Gait, Edward Albert (1893). The Assam immigration manual. India: Office of the Superintendent of Government Printing, India.
- Gait, Edward Albert (1906). A History of Assam. Calcutta: Thacker, Spink & Co..
- Gait, Edward Albert (1929). North Eastern India (Geography, archaeology, forests, flora, religion and races). Sumit Pub.

== See also ==
- Census of India prior to independence
- List of governors of Bihar and Orissa Province
