= Margaret Jones (military sponsor) =

Margaret Jones MBE
- Born: September 13, 1926
- Died: December 15, 2016 (aged 90)
- Known for: Serving as chief sponsor of Sandhurst's overseas cadets
- Relatives: Charles Bayley (grandfather)

Margaret Jones, MBE (September 13, 1926 – December 15, 2016) was a British socialite and civic volunteer who achieved distinction as a chief military sponsor at the Royal Military Academy Sandhurst for international cadets. For six decades she mentored hundreds of overseas cadets at Sandhurst, many of whom went on to become leaders in their countries. Leaders whom she supported included King Hussein of Jordan, President Mohamed bin Zayed Al Nahyan of the United Arab Emirates, and General Sher Mohammad Karimi, Chief of the Army of Afghanistan. The Foreign and Commonwealth Office, recognizing her unique contributions to British foreign policy, lobbied for her appointment to the MBE which she received in 1967.

== Service at Sandhurst ==
In 1952, already a volunteer with Sandhurst for years, Jones was placed in charge of overseas cadet welfare. While never officially on Sandhurst's payroll, funds were appropriated by the academy to pay for Jones's accommodation and cover all expenses for her duties. Contemporaries of Jones at Sandhurst called her an "institution within an institution".

In the 1970s, Sandhurst's funding was partially cut which led to less resources for overseas cadets. In the face of this, Jones took a more active role in aiding cadets. Jones partnered with the Victoria League for Commonwealth Friendship and the Middle East Association to ensure that overseas cadets were fed and housed when Sandhurst was closed for Christmas leave. Jones's efforts for overseas cadets were often profiled in Sandhurst's alumni magazine and national publications. Jones continued her support for overseas cadets well into the 2000s.

Many former overseas cadets have stated that interacting with Jones was a formative part of their Sandhurst experience, including General Karimi of Afghanistan, former head of the Malaysian Armed Forces General Yaacob Mohd Zain, and President Zayed Al Nahyan of the UAE.

== Personal life and family ==
Jones was born the youngest of four siblings to Ella (née Bayley), a homemaker, and James Kirkpatrick Jones, a Royal Navy Chaplain. Jones's mother was the daughter of Sir Charles Bayley, a military officer and colonial administrator. She would volunteer with her mother in the 1950s to arrange the flowers for and decorate the Royal Memorial Chapel. She remained unmarried for her entire life and had no children.

Official representatives from the governments of Afghanistan, Bahrain, Jordan, and Qatar attended Jones's funeral.
