= John S. Mills =

United States Air Force general

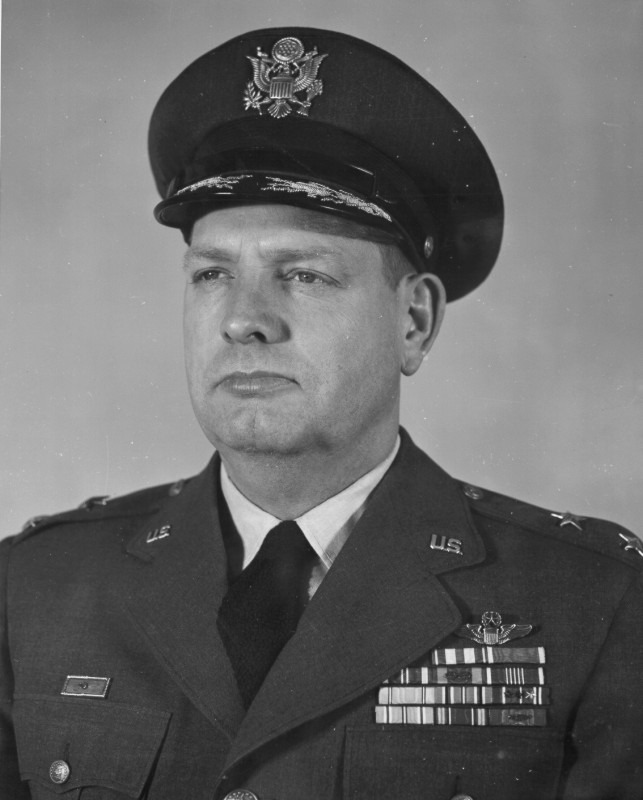

John S. Mills (1906 in Appleton, Wisconsin – July 4, 1996), was a major general in the United States Air Force. He attended Lawrence College.

== Career ==
Mills graduated from the United States Military Academy in 1928. He served with the 11th Bomb Squadron and the 28th Bomb Squadron. During World War II he served as Chief of Operations of the Mediterranean Allied Air Forces. Following the war he entered the National War College. Later in his career he served as Assistant Deputy Chief of Staff for Personnel and Assistant Deputy Chief of Staff for Development of the Air Force.

Awards he received include the Distinguished Service Medal, the Silver Star, the Legion of Merit, the Distinguished Flying Cross, and the Air Medal with two oak leaf clusters.
