= Sachchidananda Sinha =

Indian lawyer, parliamentarian, and journalist

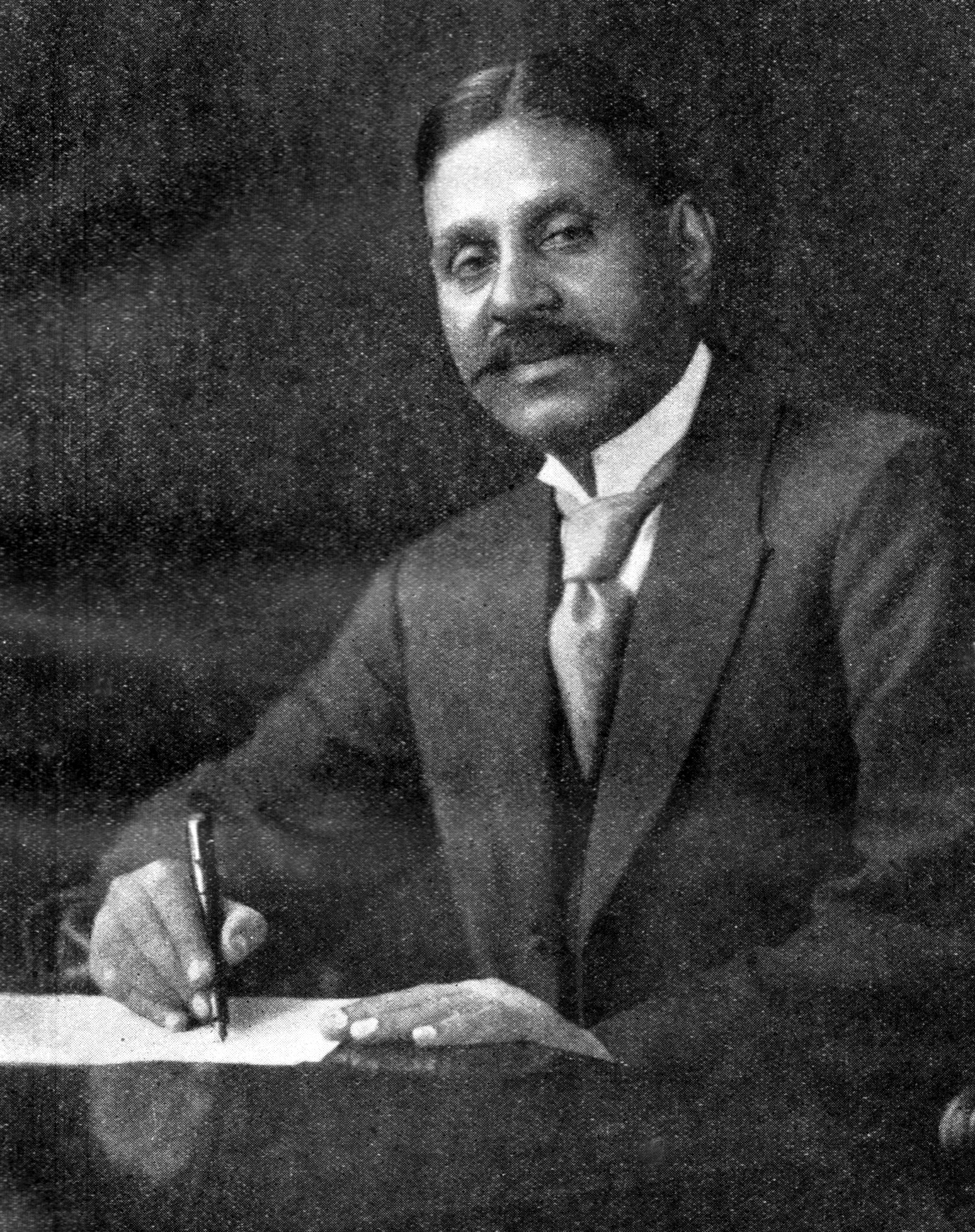

President of Constituent Assembly (Temporary Chairman)
- In office 9 December 1946 – 11 December 1946
- Succeeded by: Dr. Rajendra Prasad

Personal details
- Born: 10 November 1871 Arrah,Bengal Presidency, British India
- Died: 6 March 1950 (aged 78) Patna, Bihar, India
- Spouse: Radhika
- Education: Patna University
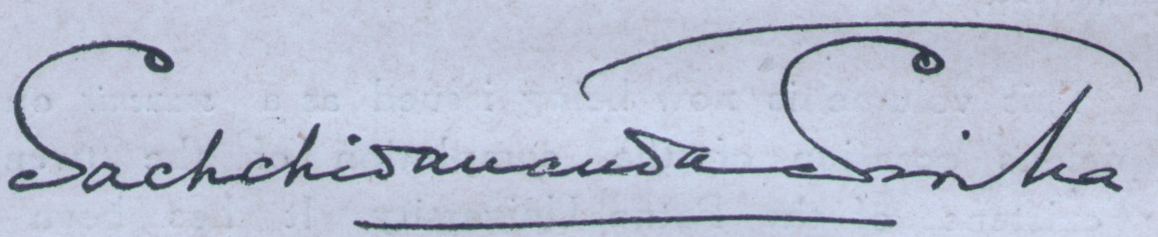
- Signature

Sachchidananda Sinha (10 November 1871 – 6 March 1950) was an Indian lawyer, statesman, administrator and educationist. He was the first President of the Indian Constituent Assembly which drafted the Constitution of India. He also served as the vice chancellor of Patna University, secretary of the Indian National Congress, and deputy speaker of the Indian Legislative Assembly.

He, along with Mahesh Narayan, is considered to be the main architects of the modern state of Bihar.

== Early life ==
Sinha was born on 10 November 1871 in Arrah, in Bengal Presidency (in present-day Bihar) into a well-to-do Srivastava Kayastha family who had served for several generations for Dumraon Raj estate. Sinha's grandfather, Bakshi Shiva Prasad Sinha, was the Chief Revenue office for the Dumraon Raj.

Sinha's father sent him to be educated in Patna and later City College, Calcutta. Later, he moved to the United Kingdom and studied law in Inner Temple, London to become a barrister. Following his return from London, Sinha began a movement for a separate province of Bihar with a small group of others. It was realized in 1912 with the formation of the Bihar and Orissa Province.

== Career ==
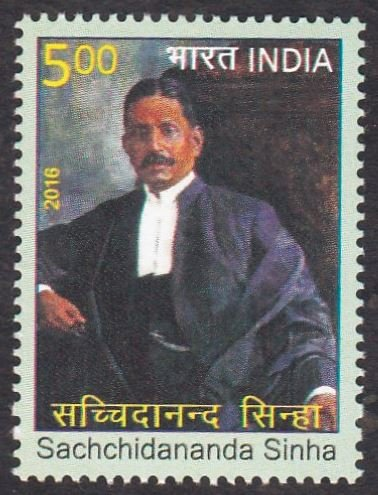
Stamp of India 2016 Dr Sachchidananda Sinha 1871-1950

Sinha began his career as an advocate in 1893 practicing in the Calcutta High Court. He subsequently practiced in the Allahabad High Court starting in 1896 where he met Justice Khuda Bakhsh Khan who gave him the responsibility to run the Khuda Bakhsh oriental public library as its secretary from 1894 - 1898 and became one of his mentor, He started practicing in Patna High Court starting in 1916.

In his early years, Sinha was a member of the Indian National Congress, from 1899 till 1920, serving one term as secretary. He participated in the Home Rule League Movement.

He was one of the vice-chancellors of Patna University and held the post from 1936 to 1944. He built the Sinha Library in 1924 in memory of his wife, Radhika.

He was a member of the Imperial Legislative Council from 1910 to 1920 and the Indian Legislative Assembly. He became the first Deputy President (Deputy Speaker) of the Assembly in 1921, after the Government of India Act 1919 institutionalised President and Deputy President to preside over the meetings of Central Legislative Assembly, a role previously played by Governor-General of India over the proceedings of the unicameral Imperial Legislative Council (1861-1920). He also held the office of the President in the Bihar and Orissa Legislative Council. He was appointed Executive Councillor and Finance Member of the Government of Bihar and Orissa, and, thus, was the first Indian who was ever appointed a Finance Member of a Province. Later, he also was a member of the Bihar Legislative Assembly..

On 9 December 1946, after the first Constituent Assembly election, the first meeting of Constituent Assembly was held in which Sinha was appointed as the temporary President of Constituent Assembly as he was the eldest member, following the French Practice.

A constituent college in Aurangabad is dedicated to him and was named Sachchidanand Sinha College, which was founded by Akhouri Krishna Prakash Sinha along with eminent Gandhian Anugrah Narayan Sinha before independence, in 1943, who named it after Sinha, as a living tribute to him, who was at that time 72 years of age. Sinha died on 6 March 1950 at his residence in Patna.

In January 2015, when US President Barack Obama visited India, he was presented with a copy of the first telegram sent from the US to India. It was sent by then acting secretary of state Dean Acheson to Sinha.

== Author ==
Sinha was a journalist and a writer. He was the publisher of the Indian Nation and editor of Hindustan Review. His works included Some Eminent Indian Contemporaries and Iqbal: The Poet and His Message (1947). Dr. Pratyush Kumar and Dr. Madan Mishra have brought out his autobiography Recollections and Reminiscences of a Long Life by Dr. Sachchidanand Sinha for the first time before readers, now published in Germany in an Open Access format (https://www.nomos-elibrary.de/de/document/view/pdf/uuid/4c61ca56-6683-3fbd-ab92-a22fcbb08d7b?page=1).
