= Charles Bayley =

British colonial administrator

Sir Charles Stuart Bayley, GCIE, KCSI, ISO (17 March 1854 – 19 September 1935) was a British colonial administrator in India.

The son of Captain Daniel Bayley, of the East India Company’s Bengal Cavalry and the grandson of William Butterworth Bayley, Bayley was educated at Harrow School and Heidelberg University. He was called to the Bar by Lincoln's Inn in 1877 and entered the Indian Civil Service the same year.

In India, Bayley was Under-Secretary to the Governments of Bengal and India. Political Agent in Bikaner, General Superintendent of operations for the suppression of Thagi and Dakaiti, Agent to the Governor-General in Central India, Officiating Lieutenant-Governor in Eastern Bengal and Assam; Resident at Hyderabad, Lieutenant-Governor of Eastern Bengal and Assam until 1912, and the first Lieutenant-Governor of Bihar and Orissa from 1912 to 1915. He was a member of the Council of India from 1915 to 1924.

He was appointed a Companion of the Order of the Star of India (CSI) in the 1903 Durbar Honours, and later promoted to Knight Commander of the order (KCSI). He was also appointed a Knight Grand Commander of the Order of the Indian Empire (GCIE). He is the grandfather of Margaret Jones, who served as the chief sponsor of overseas cadets at the Royal Military Academy Sandhurst and was appointed MBE for her efforts.
