= Suryapura, Bihar =

Suryapura Surajpura
- Village
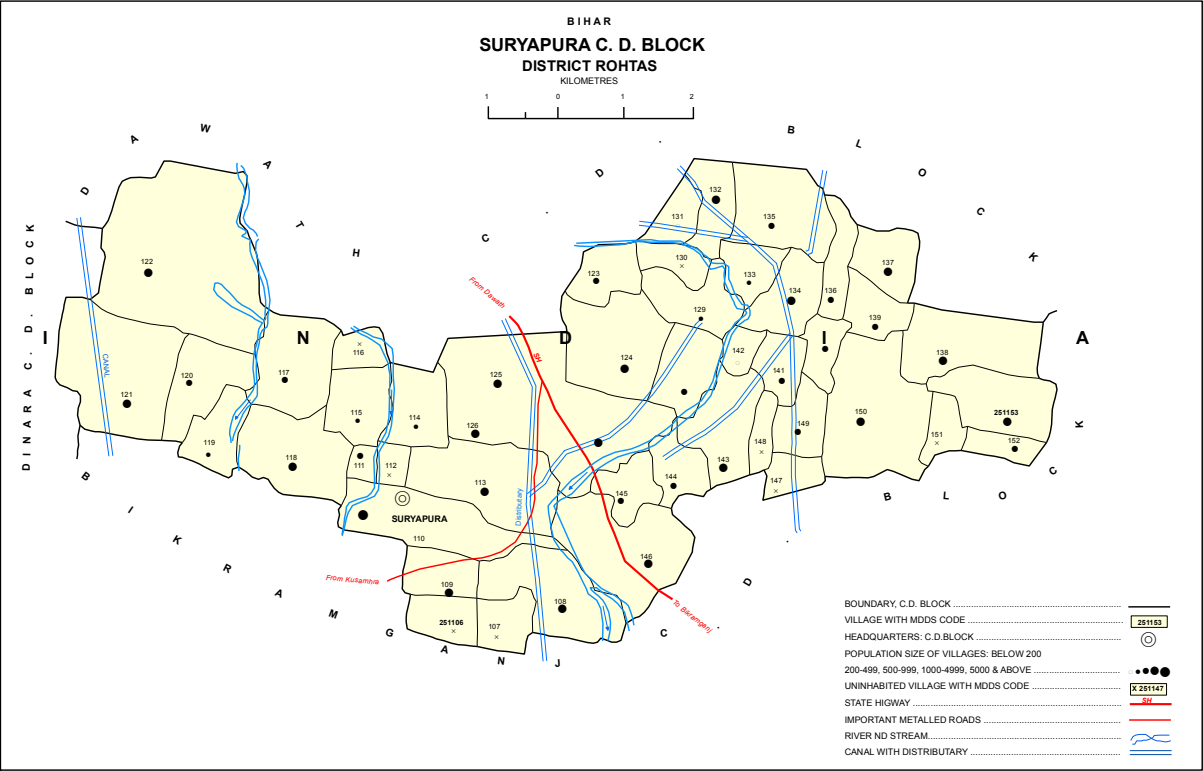

- Location in Bihar, India
- Coordinates: 25.25864°N 84.22546°E
- Country: India
- State: Bihar
- District: Rohtas

Area
  - Total: 1.96 km^{2} (0.76 sq mi)
- Elevation: 89 m (292 ft)

Population (2011)
  - Total: 6,347
  - Density: 3,240/km^{2} (8,390/sq mi)

Languages
  - Official: Hindi
- Time zone: UTC+5:30 (IST)
- PIN: 802221

Suryapura, also spelled Surajpura, is a subdivision of the Rohtas district as well as a corresponding village in Bihar, India. Historically, it served as the capital of Surajpura Raj.

== Demographics ==
Historical population
Year	Pop.	±%
2001	48,222	—
2011	57,529	+19.3%
Source: 2011 Census of India

Suryapura is a rural block, with no large urban centres. The sex ratio of Suryapura block was 918 as of 2011, which was equal to the Rohtas district average (although slightly below the rural average of 921 for the district). The ratio was slightly higher among the 0-6 age group, with 928 females for every 1000 males. The gender distribution in Suryapura itself was 3,331 male and 3,016 female. Members of scheduled castes constituted 15.46% of the population (somewhat lower than the district average), while members of scheduled tribes made up 0.2% (also lower than the district average). The literacy rate of Suryapura block was 72.06%, which was slightly below the district average of 73.37% (72.50% in rural areas). Literacy was higher in men than in women, with 82.98% of men but only 60.13% of women able to read and write, resulting in a 22.85% gender literacy gap (higher than the overall district average of 19.91% as well as the rural average of 21.04%).

=== Employment ===
Most people in Suryapura block were engaged in agriculture in 2011, with 35.72% of the workforce being cultivators who owned or leased their own land, and a further 39.62% being agricultural labourers who worked someone else's land for wages. 4.86% of the workforce was engaged in household industries, and the remaining 19.80% were classified as "other workers".

== Amenities ==
All 40 inhabited villages in Suryapura block have access to drinking water, although only 3 of them have tap water, Suryapura itself among them. 28 villages have schools, serving 90.3% of the block's population, and 12 have medical facilities, serving 46.58%. 24 villages have telephone service, serving 74.2% of the block's residents, and 32 have electrical power, serving 92.26%.

Narayanpur village in Suryapura block has large electric power station supplying power to not only Suryapura block but a large area within Rohtas district and neighbouring districts.

Five villages have banks and agricultural credit societies, 13 have transport communications (rail, bus, or navigable waterways), and 20 have permanent pucca roads. Narayanpur village of Suryapura block has Canara Bank branch, formerly Syndicate Bank serving customers from within Suryapura block and nearby areas for decades.

== Land use ==
Suryapura block covers an area of 5,723.24 hectares; of this total area, 85.45% is cultivable. Of the cultivable area, 75.42% was irrigated. In the village of Suryapura itself, there are 150.6 hectares of farmland.

== Villages ==
In total, there are 48 villages in Suryapura block, including Suryapura itself. 40 of these are inhabited and the remaining 8 are uninhabited. Narayanpur is a prominent village of Suryapura block situated on National Highway 120, nearly 6 km from subdivisional headquarter of Bikramganj.

Narayanpur village of Suryapura block is highly developed compared to other villages of Suryapura block.

Village name	Total land area (hectares)	Population (in 2011)
Kharauj Khurd	49	0
Dubali	54	0
Balihar	178	4,369
Kharauj Kalan	80	1,628
Surajpura (headquarters)	196	6,347
Sirikantpur	26	724
Harpur	36	0
Barun	248	3,834
Bhur Kunriya Kalan	85	434
Bhur Kunriya Khurd	86	425
Jora	42	0
Surhuriya	161	875
Dobariya	206	1,352
Rampur	83	237
Lakhanpura	105	975
Angrer Khurd	293	3,519
Agrer Kalan	524	3,250
Ragho Dehra	29	903
Shiwa Bahar	64	2,305
Kailani	227	1,568
Gothani	174	1,734
Narayanpur	66	1,682
Dhawai	229	798
Parariya	98	447
Randehra	106	0
Bijechaunri	45	13
Kosanda	63	1,382
Kosanda Buzurg	87	363
Gosal Dih	60	1,862
Dhango	97	654
Chaurasi	188	565
Ratanpatti	70	1,255
Jamuara	189	1,376
Madaina	78	536
Hunka Dih	62	600
Nima	51	617
Digar Majhauli	30.64	82
Kawai	136.3	1,794
Chauriya	78.9	683
Imirta	77.3	797
Aliganj	260.31	1,784
Bahrar	65.2	0
Atrauliya	35.9	0
Anhar	78.1	982
Karma	276	2,538
Gaha Dih	42.1	0
Kalyanpur	57.35	713
Suara	130.34	1,527
