= Hugh Stephenson (journalist) =

British writer and journalist (born 1938)

Hugh Arthur Stephenson (born 18 July 1938) is a British journalist on The Times from 1968 to 1981, and the editor of the New Statesman from 1982 to 1986.

== Early life ==
Stephenson was born in British India, the son of Sir Hugh Stephenson (1906–1972), a member of the Indian Civil Service. The family returned to England in 1946, and his father joined the Foreign Office.

Hugh Stephenson was educated at Winchester College, where he became joint-head boy. He served his national service with the Royal Navy. He attended New College, Oxford, and served as President of the Oxford Union in 1962.

== Career ==
Stephenson initially worked for the diplomatic service. He was the business editor for The Times from 1972 until 1981.

Alongside James Bellini, Stephenson interviewed Sir James Goldsmith for the BBC Money Programme in 1977. For Patrick Hutber of The Sunday Telegraph, it was "as memorable a piece of television as is ever likely to be shown".

Stephenson was editor of the New Statesman from 1982 to 1986. He was professor of journalism at City University in London from 1986 until his retirement in 2003. Stephenson served as The Guardian's crossword editor for 27 years, until his retirement in February 2024.
