= Hugh Lansdown Stephenson =

British colonial administrator

Sir Hugh Lansdown Stephenson GCIE, KCSI

Governor of Burma
- In office 20 December 1932 – 8 May 1936
- Preceded by: Charles Alexander Innes
- Succeeded by: Archibald Cochrane

Governor of Bihar and Orissa
- In office 7 April 1927 – 7 April 1932
- Preceded by: Sir Henry Wheeler
- Succeeded by: Sir James David Sifton

Personal details
- Born: 8 April 1871 London
- Died: 6 September 1941 (aged 70)
- Spouse: Mary Daphne Maidlow (m. 1905)
- Children: 1 son, Hugh
- Education: Christ Church, Oxford
- Occupation: Administrator

Sir Hugh Lansdown Stephenson, GCIE, KCSI (8 April 1871 – 6 September 1941) was a British colonial administrator who served as the governor of Bihar and Orissa from 7 April 1927 to 7 April 1932 and the Governor of Burma from December 1932 to May 1936.

== Biography ==
Educated at Westminster School and Christ Church, Oxford, Stephenson joined the Indian Civil Service in 1895.

He was appointed CIE in 1913, CSI in 1919, KCIE in 1924, KCSI in 1927, and GCIE in 1936.

Government offices
Preceded by Sir Charles Alexander Innes	Governor of Burma; 1932–1936	Succeeded by Sir Archibald Douglas Cochrane
Preceded by Sir Henry Wheeler	Governor of Bihar and Orissa; 1927–1932	Succeeded by Sir James David Sifton
