= Havilland Le Mesurier (civil servant) =

British administrator in India

Sir Havilland Le Mesurier, KCIE, CSI (22 June 1866 – 7 April 1931) was a British administrator in India.

== Biography ==
The son of E. A. Le Mesurier of Genoa, Havilland Le Mesurier was educated at Rugby School and Balliol College, Oxford. He entered the Indian Civil Service in 1884 or 1886, and was assistant commissioner in Assam. In 1892, he became assistant magistrate and collector in Bengal, and was promoted to joint magistrate and deputy collector in 1893, and magistrate and collector in 1897.

He was transferred to Eastern Bengal and Assam as Commissioner of the Dacca Division in 1906, and became Chief Secretary to the Government of Eastern Bengal in 1909. In 1912, he became Chief Secretary to the Government of Bihar and Orissa. In 1916, he was promoted to Commissioner of Orissa, and he was a member of the Executive Council from 1917 until 1922, when he retired. He also acted as Governor of Bihar and Orissa Province for a period.

Le Mesurier was appointed CIE in 1903, CSI in 1910, and knighted KCIE on his retirement in 1922.

== Family ==
Le Mesurier married May Stuart Hopkins, daughter of John Arthur Hopkins, ICS, in 1893; they had three sons, two of whom were killed in the First World War.
