= Zamindars of Bihar =

Autonomous chiefs in the Mughal Suba of Bihar

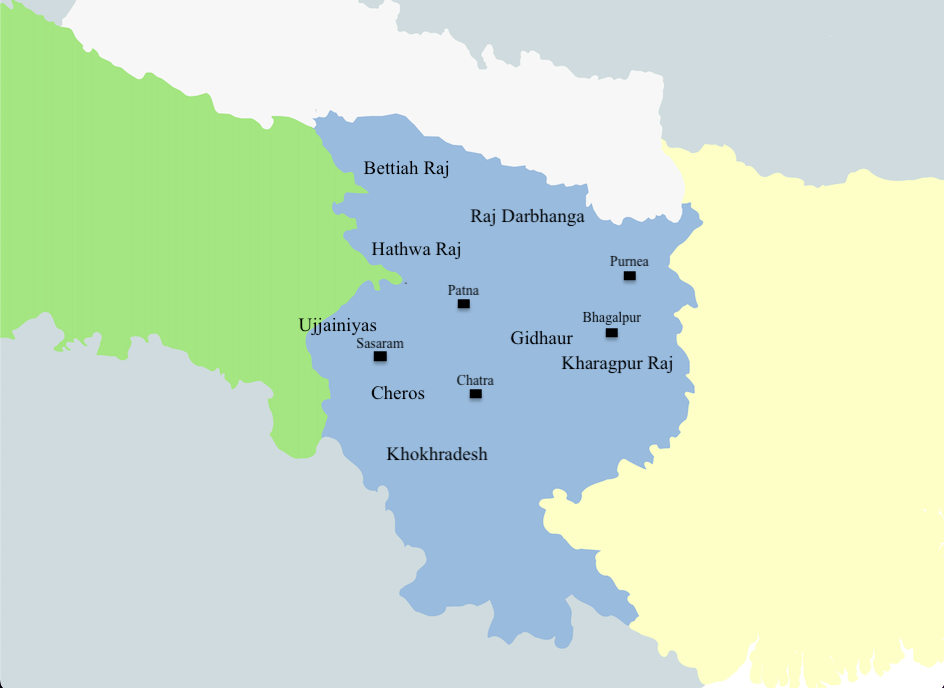
Political map of the Subah of Bihar in 1650 CE showing the main chieftaincies/zamindaris in the region

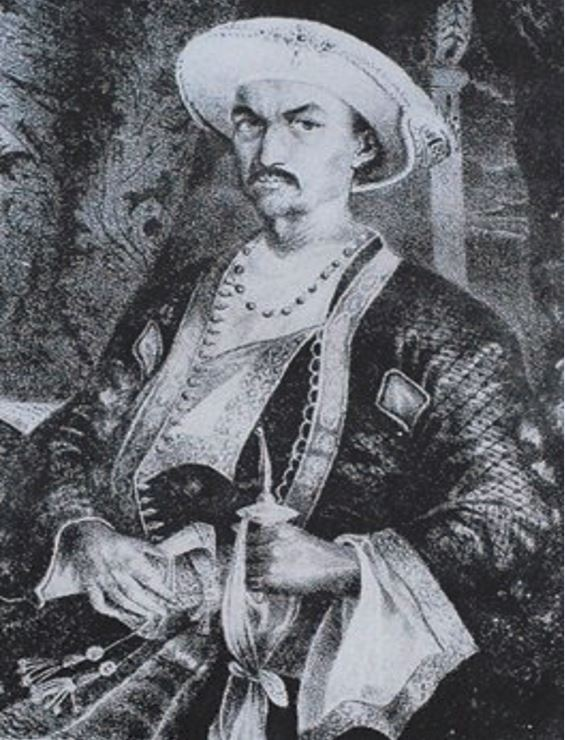
Maharaja Mitrajeet Singh of Tekari Raj

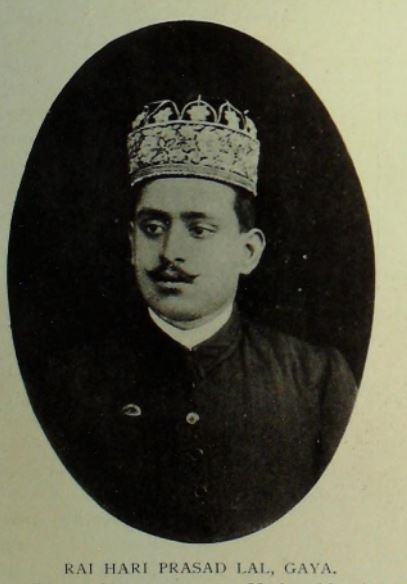
Rai Hariprasad Lal of Gaya

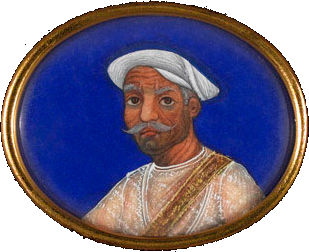
Kunwar Singh of the Jagdishpur estate

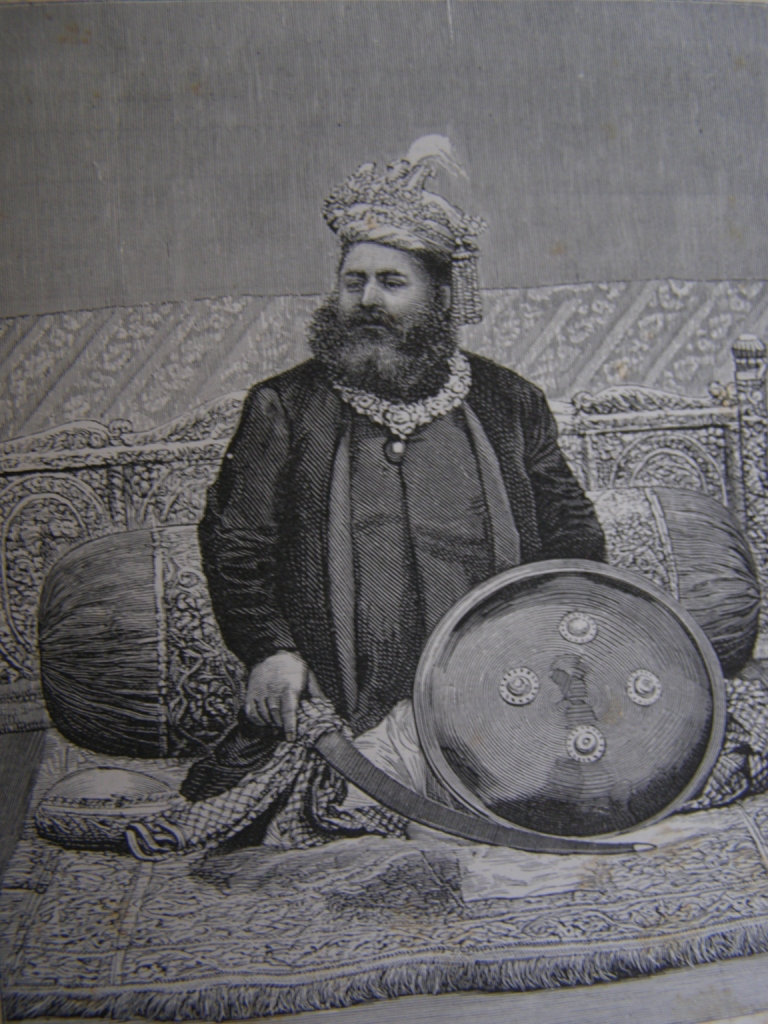
Maharaja Lakshmeshwar Singh of Raj Darbhanga in 1888.

The Zamindars of Bihar were the autonomous rulers and administrators of the Bihar Subah during Mughal rule and later during British rule. They formed the landed aristocracy that lasted until Indian independence in 1947. The zamindars of Bihar were numerous and could be divided into small, medium and large depending on how much land they controlled. Within Bihar, the zamindars had both economic and military power. Each zamindari would have its own standing army which was typically composed of the zamindar's own clansmen.

The majority of these zamindars usually belonged to Hindu communities such as Bhumihars, Rajputs, Brahmins, Kayasthas or Muslims.

== History ==
=== Mughal period ===
Mughal rule in Bihar was characterised as turbulent and volatile as many of the region's zamindars made continuous efforts to defy the imperial authority. Unlike the Zamindars of neighbouring Bengal Subah who had experienced a reduction in their rights and powers, the zamindars of Bihar maintained increased autonomy with "fickle loyalties towards the Government".

The nineteenth-century British civil servant, John Beames noted about Mughal-ruled Bihar that "everyone who was powerful enough to rob the state or his neighbours, robbed to his heart's content". Zamindars refusing to pay the state and gathering forces to attack neighbouring zamindars was a common practice in Bihar during this period. In a report to the Patna Committee of Revenue, the then Naib Dewan of Bihar, Shitab Rai, had admitted that due to the declining state of the empire in the late seventeenth century, the zamindars had become practically independent of the Mughals.

This attitude to authority continued into the period when the Nawabs of Bengal and Murshidabad became the nominal governors of Bihar. Although Bihar had the potential to provide a large amount of revenue and tax, records show that the Nawabs were unable to extract any money from the chiefs of Bihar until 1748. And even following this, the amount gained was very low. This was again due to the rebellious nature of the zamindars who were "continually in arms".

=== Colonia-era ===
After the collapse of the Mughal empire, the British East India Company held sway over much of South Asia. The colonial power wanted the revenue system "to be simple in its principle and uniform in its operation," but the zamindari system was so ingrained that even the early British rulers, from the grant of Dewani (1765) to the Permanent Settlement (1793), dared not challenge it fundamentally. The early British rulers did not want any "innovation" or "experimentation," even if the zamindars, taluqdars, and many estates were defaulters to the government for not paying the raised land fee. This was because such a radical measure would have violated the 'customary' rights and privilege. Some of the zamindars took part in a revolt against the British in 1781 following on from a revolt led by the Maharaja of Benares, however, this was swiftly put down.

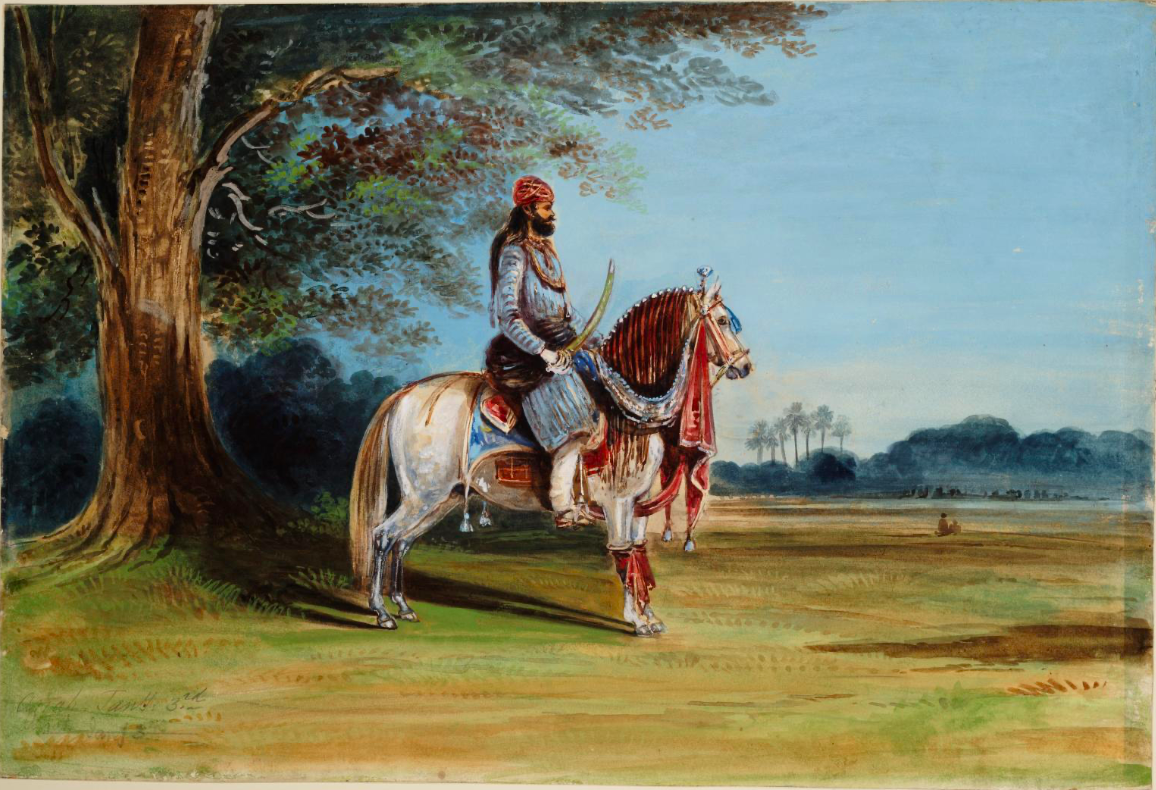
19th century painting depicting a soldier for a zamindar in Bihar

With the exception of a few new men here and there, the old landed nobility formed the social cornerstone of the new establishment in 1793. One could claim that the early British emperors were dependent on a customary class of upper caste aristocrats. Since the majority of zamindars involved in estate auctions were Brahmins or members of upper caste families, Hastings was against the open selling of estates and instead supported giving them a higher position in the rural power structure. The zamindars of Bihar seem to have suffered far less than the old zamindars of Bengal and Orissa, who suffered considerably. The Darbhanga Raj, the Hathwa Raj, the Tekari Raj, the Bettiah Raj , and the Dumraon families in Shahabad were among the prominent zamindars of Bihar who enjoyed prosperity.

The goal behind the establishment of the revenue farms in Bengal and Bihar was to obtain the highest possible share of the net produce and then fix it for all time under the Permanent Settlement. The colonial authority began to require the zamindars in place, including those who were established as landowners for all time, to make a regular, ongoing payment.

== Social condition in Zamindari areas ==
The Permanent Settlement act by the British East India Company did not significantly alter the landholding patterns in Bihar, leaving Rajputs and Bhumihars as the major Zamindars. It curtailed some of their powers, but also took away the customary occupancy rights of the peasantry.

The British rule enabled Rajputs to continue their dominance by cementing their entitlements related to land and tax collection. Exercise of coercive power by the dominant castes over the vulnerable landless labourers took various forms such as forced labour, higher rents, lower wages, social restrictions, evictions and sexual harassment. Rape of women from lower caste by Rajput and Bhumihar landowners was common in the Shahabad district, particularly in a couple of villages of Bhojpur (modern name for Shahabad district), where sexual desire of the upper-castes was satisfied through arrogant and unrestricted access to the modesty of women belonging to Chamar and Musahar caste. Emerging organisations of middle peasant castes like Triveni Sangh and Kisan Sabhas took up the issues of exploitation, with the Naxal threat also acting as a check.

== Abolition and decline in political presence of Zamindars ==
Following independence in 1947, there was large-scale support in Bihar for the abolition of zamindari especially among peasants, agricultural labourers and the urban middle-class who stood to gain the most from this. This culminated in a large-scale movement in support of abolition led by lower-castes. The Bhumihar zamindars realised that abolition was going to occur and planned for abolition to be on their terms. However, the Rajput-Kayastha zamindars strongly resisted this. Eventually, the Bihar Abolition of Zamindaris Act was passed in 1949. "The abolition of the zamindari system had a profound impact on the social landscape. Many upper-caste zamindars, who had long held power and privilege, were stripped of their land and influence. Meanwhile, descendants of Kayastha zamindars, who had historically wielded significant local influence, adapted to the new political landscape by engaging in local panchayat politics. This shift allowed them to maintain their influence and shape the destiny of their communities, fostering a new era of grassroots leadership and social change."

In the later period of time, when the abolition of Zamindari took place in Bihar and the castes like Yadav, Kurmi, Koiri and Bhumihar became the prime movers of the emerging capitalist agriculture system of central Bihar. The new semi-feudal social order brought unintended benefits for these caste groups in which the question of dignity and minimum wages came to the fore. The Green Revolution further benefited these communities. Hence, in later periods, many landed Other Backward Castes also emerged as zamindars, primarily from a group called Upper Backward Castes.

Prior to the independence of India, many forward caste Zamindars like Kayastha & Brahmin zamindars started taking interest in politics, and they also participated in the Quit India Movement, anticipating the end of British rule, which protected them. According to DM Diwakar, a former director of Patna's AN Sinha Institute of Social Sciences, these feudal elites had a significant presence in the politics of the state in the first few decades of the post-independence period, but they started losing this significant position in the 1970s. In the first tenure of Nitish Kumar, they staged a comeback in the politics of state, but in the next tenures, they were completely marginalised and according to Diwakar, were converted into "silent onlookers" by 2020.

== Notable zamindari estates ==
Notable zamindaris and principalities in Bihar include:

- Deo Raj
- Hathwa Raj
- Tekari Raj
- Bettiah Raj
- Kharagpur Raj
- Jagdishpur estate
- Dumraon Raj
- Raj Darbhanga
- Cheros of Palamu
- Gidhaur chieftaincy
- Khokhra Chieftaincy

== See also ==
- Indian feudalism
- Indian honorifics
- Jagirdar
- Ghatwals and Mulraiyats
- Thakur
- Zamindars of Bengal

== Sources ==
  - Ansari, Tahir Hussain (2019). Mughal Administration and the Zamindars of Bihar. Routledge. ISBN 9781000651522.
