= Hugh Southern Stephenson =

Indian-born British diplomat (1906–1972)

Sir Hugh Stephenson GBE KCMG CIE CVO KStJ
- Born: November 29, 1906; Ranchi
- Died: September 23, 1972 (aged 65); London
- Children: 3, including Hugh Artthur Stephenson

Sir Hugh Southern Stephenson (November 29, 1906 – September 23, 1972) was a British diplomat. He was born in Ranchi, India in 1906, the only son of Sir Hugh Lansdown Stephenson. In July 1936, he married Patricia Mills. Starting in December 1969, he was the appointed director of the St. John Ambulance Association; also, in 1970, he was honored as a knight of The Most Venerable Order of the Hospital of St. John of Jerusalem. He died in London, United Kingdom on September 23, 1972.

== Appointments ==
- 1947–49: Deputy High Commissioner, Lahore
- 1952–54: Counsellor, Middle East Office
- 1954–57: Ambassador to South Vietnam
- 1957–60: Consul-General, New York
- 1960–63: Deputy Under-Secretary for Foreign Affairs
- 1963–66: Ambassador to South Africa, also
- 1963-1964: High Commissioner for Southern Africa

Source: Foreign, Commonwealth and Development Office
