= Bihar and Orissa Province =

1912–1936 province of British India

Coordinates: 21.00°N 86.30°E

- Province of British India
- 1912–1936
- Flag Coat of arms

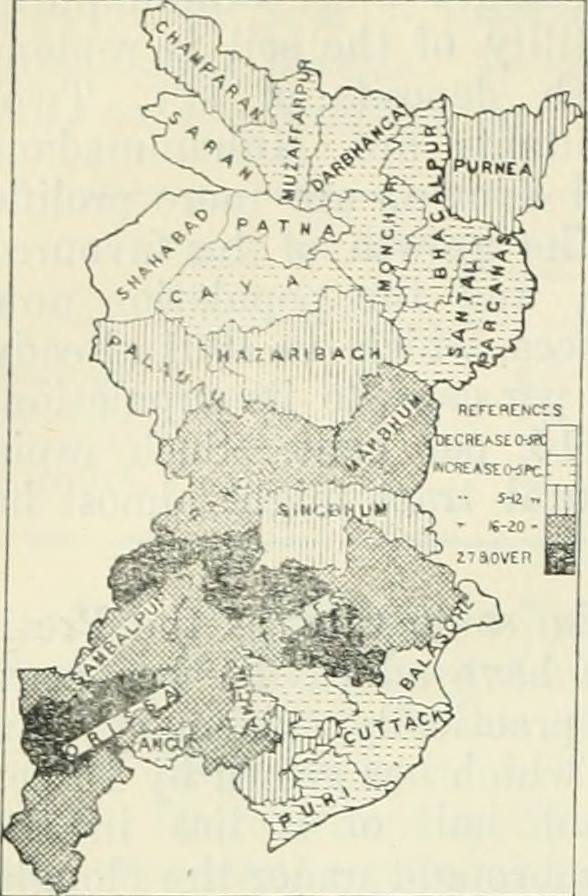
- Bihar and Orissa in a 1912 map
- Capital: Patna (summer); Cuttack (winter)
- History
  - Separation from Bengal: 1912
  - Bifurcation of Bihar and Orissa Province: 1936
Preceded by	Succeeded by
Bengal Presidency	Bihar Province; Orissa Province
- Today part of: Bihar; Jharkhand; Odisha

Bihar and Orissa was a province of British India, which included the present-day Indian states of Bihar, Jharkhand, and parts of Odisha. The territories were conquered by the British in the 18th and 19th centuries, and were governed by the then Indian Civil Service of the Bengal Presidency, the largest administrative subdivision in British India.

On 22 March 1912, both Bihar and Orissa divisions were separated from the Bengal Presidency as Bihar and Orissa Province. On 1 April 1936, the province was partitioned into Bihar and the Orissa Province.

== History ==
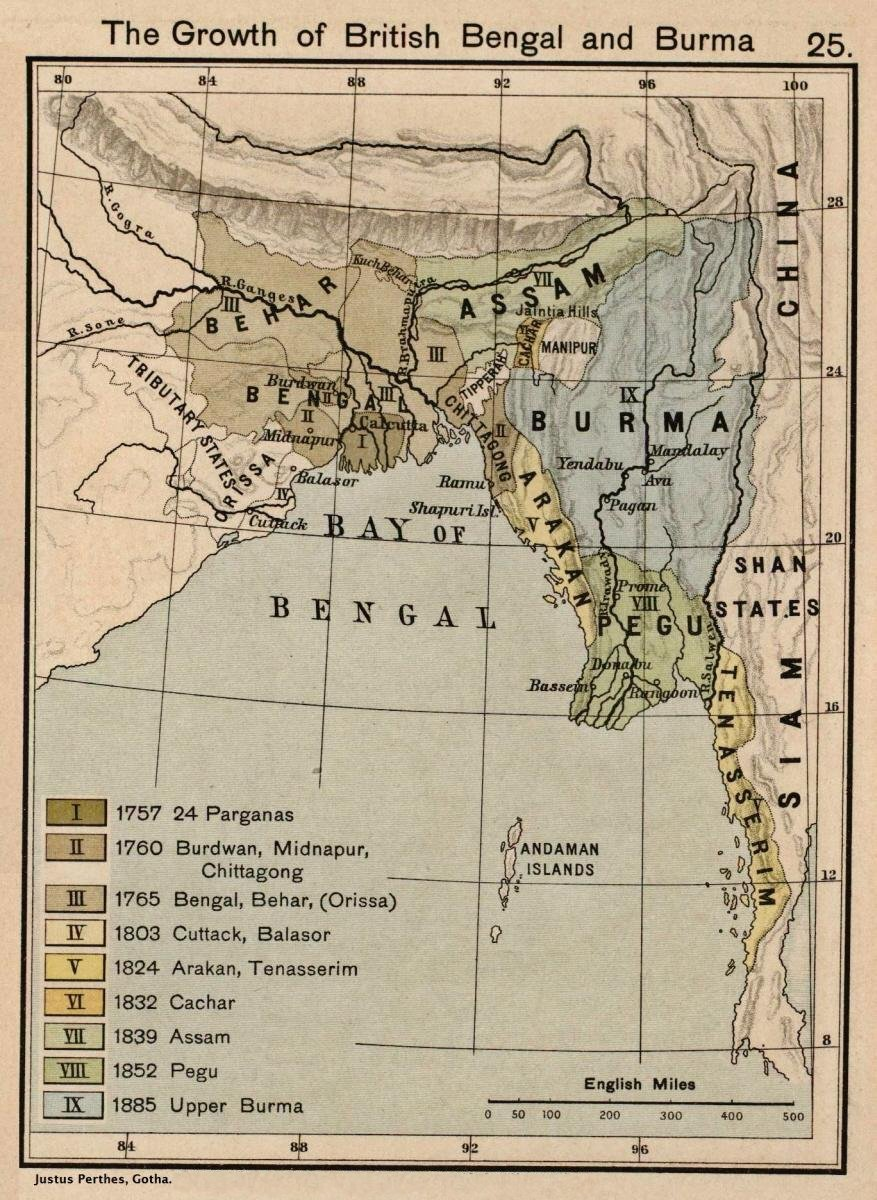
Bihar and Orissa in a 1907 map of British India before the creation of the province.

In 1756, Bihar was part of the Bengal Subah and while Orissa was part of the Nagpur kingdom within the Maratha Confederacy.

The Treaty of Allahabad was signed on 16 August 1765, between the Mughal Emperor Shah Alam II, son of the late Emperor Alamgir II, and Robert, Lord Clive, of the East India Company, as a result of the Battle of Buxar of 22 October 1764. The Treaty marks the political and constitutional involvement and the beginning of British rule in India. Based on the terms of the agreement, Alam granted the East India Company Diwani rights, or the right to collect taxes on behalf of the Emperor from the eastern province of Bengal-Bihar-Orissa. Bihar was acquired through annexation of Bengal Subah, while Orissa was annexed by the British following the defeat of the Marathas in the Anglo-Maratha Wars.

Bihar and Orissa was separated from Bengal on 1 April 1912, with Patna as capital. A number of princely states, including the Orissa Tributary States, were under the authority of the provincial governor.

=== Dyarchy (1921–1937) ===
The Montagu–Chelmsford Reforms enacted through the Government of India Act 1919 expanded the Bihar & Orissa Legislative Council from 43 to 103 members. The Legislative Council now consisted of 2 ex-officio Executive Councillors, 25 nominated members (12 official, 13 non-official) and 76 elected members (48 Non-Muslim, 18 Muslim, 1 European, 3 Commerce & Industry, 5 Landholders and 1 University constituencies). The reforms also introduced the principle of dyarchy, whereby certain responsibilities such as agriculture, health, education, and local government, were transferred to elected ministers.

Name	Period	Department
Khan Bahadur Syed Muhammad Fakhruddin	January 1921 to 6 May 1933	Education, Agriculture, Cooperative Credit Industries, Religious Endowment, Excise
Madhusudan Das	January 1921 to 9 March 1923	Local Self-Government, Medical Public Health, Public Works
Ganesh Dutt	March 1923 till end of dyarchy	Local Self-Government, Medical Public Health, Public Works
Khan Bahadur Syed Muhammad Hussain	6 May 1933 to 24 December 1933	Education, Agriculture, Cooperative Credit Industries, Religious Endowment, Registration
Syed Muhammad Abdul Aziz	20 January 1934 till end of dyarchy	Education, Agriculture, Cooperative Credit Industries, Religious Endowment, Registration

=== Division ===
On 1 April 1936, the province was divided into Bihar Province (which included present-day Bihar and Jharkhand states) and Orissa Province, and the Odia speaking princely states placed under the authority of the Eastern States Agency.

== Governors of Bihar and Orissa ==
From 1912 to 1920, the province had a lieutenant governor heading the provincial government. This post was upgraded to governor in 1920, when Satyendra Prasanna Sinha, 1st Baron Sinha was appointed to fill it.

=== Lieutenant governors ===
- 1 April 1912 – 19 November 1915 Sir Charles Stuart Bayley (b. 1854 – d. 1935)
- 19 Nov 1915 – 5 April 1918 Sir Edward Albert Gait (1st term) (b. 1863 – d. 1950)
- 5 April 1918 – 12 July 1918 Sir Edward Vere Levinge (acting) (b. 1867 – d. 1954)
- 12 Jul 1918 – 29 December 1920 Sir Edward Albert Gait (2nd term) (s.a.)

=== Governors ===
- 29 Dec 1920 – 29 November 1921 Satyendra Prasanna Sinha, 1st Baron Sinha (b. 1864 – d. 1928)
- 29 Nov 1921 – 12 April 1922 Havilland Le Mesurier (acting) (b. 1866 – d. 1931)
- 12 Apr 1922 – 7 April 1927 Sir Henry Wheeler (b. 1870 – d. 1950)
- 7 April 1927 – 7 April 1932 Sir Hugh Lansdowne Stephenson (b. 1871 – d. 1950)
- 7 April 1932 – 1 April 1936 Sir James David Sifton (b. 1878 – d. 1952)

== See also ==
- Eastern States Agency
