= Rahmani =

Rahmani is a surname used in Iran, India, Afghanistan and Egypt. Notable people with the surname include:

- Ali Rahmani, Iranian businessperson and academic
- Arsala Rahmani, Afghan politician
- Aviva Rahmani, American artist
- Moïse Rahmani, Egyptian sefarad writer
- Bakhtiar Rahmani, Iranian footballer
- Jannat Zubair Rahmani, Indian actress
- Minnatullah Rahmani, Indian Islamic scholar
- Wali Rahmani, Indian Sunni Islamic scholar and academician who founded Rahmani30
- Khalid Saifullah Rahmani, Indian scholar and jurist of Islam
- Niloofar Rahmani, Afghani pilot
- Nosrat Rahmani, Iranian poet and writer
- Rassa Rahmani, Swedish footballer
- Zahia Rahmani (born 1962), French-Algerian author

== See also ==
- Rahmaniyya, Sunni Sufi order in Algeria
- Rrahmani, Albanian surname
