= Umrain Mahfooz Rahmani =

Indian Islamic scholar and religious leader

Muhammad Umrain Mahfooz Rahmani
- محمد عمرین محفوظ رحمانی

Secretary, All India Muslim Personal Law Board
- Incumbent
- Assumed office 2016
- Website: https://www.maulanaumrain.com/

Personal life
- Born: Muhammad Umrain; 10 April 1987 (age 39) Malegaon, Maharashtra, India

Religious life
- Religion: Islam
- Denomination: Sunni
- Jurisprudence: Hanafi
- Movement: Deobandi

Muslim leader
- Disciple of: Wali Rahmani

Muhammad Umrain Mahfooz Rahmani (born 10 April 1987) is an Indian Islamic scholar, preacher, and religious leader. He serves as the secretary of the All India Muslim Personal Law Board (AIMPLB) and the All-India Joint Convener of its Social Reform Committee. In 2023, he was appointed a regional secretary for the Board’s national campaign to promote inheritance rights for Muslim women. Based in Malegaon, Maharashtra, he is the president of Idara-e-Saut-ul-Islam and has also served as the rector of Ma'had-e-Millat. He remains actively engaged in religious education, community outreach, and social reform initiatives.

== Early life and education ==
Muhammad Umrain Mahfooz Rahmani was born on 10 April 1987 in Malegaon, Maharashtra. His father, Mahfoozur Rahman Qasmi, was a religious scholar who served as the Shaykh al-Hadith (senior hadith instructor) and head teacher at Madrasa Bayt al-Ulum, Malegaon.

He began his early education at Madrasa Islamiya in Malegaon and later studied at Ashraf al-Madaris in Hardoi, Uttar Pradesh. He returned to Malegaon and graduated in 2006 from Ma'had-e-Millat, Malegaon. His teachers included Abdul Ahad Azhari, Muhammad Idris Aqeel Milli Qasmi, Yasin Ahmad Milli, and Zubair Ahmad Milli.

Following his formal education, on the advice of his mentor, Wali Rahmani, he devoted a year or two to independent study rather than joining any higher educational institution. During this period, he focused on Qur'anic exegesis, Qur'anic sciences, and classical Sufi literature, engaging with spiritual thought from a scholarly perspective.

== Career ==
=== Roles and contributions ===
After completing his studies, Rahmani began teaching the Qur'an and has remained engaged with Qur'anic exegesis for several years, a work that continues to the present. Known for his clarity of expression, Rahmani is an articulate speaker and writer, often praised for his straightforward oratory style, reminiscent of his mentor Wali Rahmani.

In 2008, he became affiliated with the All India Muslim Personal Law Board. He was elected as a full member in 2013 and subsequently as the board’s secretary in 2016. In 2017, he was appointed as the All-India Joint Convener of the Social Reform Committee of the Board, a position from which he led regional outreach and reform campaigns. In 2023, he was also appointed as one of the regional secretaries for the AIMPLB's national campaign to promote inheritance rights for Muslim women.

In addition to his role within the AIMPLB, Rahmani also serves as the president of Idara-e-Saut-ul-Islam, a Malegaon-based religious and educational institution engaged in community outreach and reform activities.

He served for a brief period as the rector (mohtamim) of Ma'had-e-Millat, Malegaon, beginning in 2022. During his tenure, he was involved in administrative oversight, contributed to the development of the seminary’s Islamic studies curriculum—up to the tenth grade—and facilitated the establishment of new academic departments. He also taught texts such as Sunan Ibn Mājah at Jamiat al-Talim al-Banat and occasionally delivered lessons at Ma'had-e-Millat, before stepping down due to other responsibilities.

He is also the patron of Markaz Tahaffuz-e-Islam Hind, a religious platform focused on Islamic education and constitutional awareness.

He was also the founder and convener of the Dastoor-e-Hind Bachao Committee, which led mass protests and public awareness campaigns in Malegaon during the nationwide movement against the Citizenship (Amendment) Act (CAA) and the proposed National Register of Citizens (NRC).

=== Spiritual leadership ===
Following his initial academic engagement with Sufi literature, Rahmani formally entered the spiritual path under the guidance of Wali Rahmani. He received ijazah and khilafah in 2010.

He later founded the Khanqah Rahmaniyyah in Malegaon, affiliated with the Naqshbandi Mujaddidi order, where he serves as Sajjada Nashin. The site hosts regular majalis, spiritual retreats, and communal i‘tikāf during Ramadan.

In addition to his primary affiliation, he received spiritual authorization (ijazah and khilafah) from several other scholars, including Abdullah Mughisi, Mustafa Rifai Jilani, Yunus Palanpuri, and Muhammad Ramzan Mewati.

=== Social reform efforts ===
In 2017, Rahmani was appointed as the all-India joint convener of the Social Reform Committee of the All India Muslim Personal Law Board (AIMPLB) by its president Rabey Hasani Nadwi. He subsequently led a ten-day campaign across several districts of the Marathwada region in Maharashtra, which culminated in a large public meeting in Parbhani on 20 October 2017. The campaign emphasized adherence to Islamic personal law and opposition to legal amendments affecting it, with Rahmani addressing over twenty gatherings across eight districts.

In April 2021, Rahmani played a key role in a nationwide AIMPLB campaign to combat dowry demands and discourage extravagant wedding practices, following the suicide of a woman in Gujarat due to alleged dowry harassment. He noted that while un-Islamic customs were declining and more weddings were being held in mosques, financial burdens continued to prevent many poor women from marrying. The campaign included a widely circulated 11-point guideline and local outreach through sermons and public discussions.

In a follow-up online session in September 2021 chaired by Rahmani, the Islah-e-Muasharah Committee reiterated the Board’s position against lavish weddings. Board president Nadwi described such practices as unfortunate, and several members—including Arshad Madani, Khalid Saifullah Rahmani, Syed Qasim Rasool Iliyas, and Zafar Mahmood—advocated social boycotts of ostentatious ceremonies and urged the redirection of wealth toward education, health, and poverty alleviation.

In September 2023, the AIMPLB launched another national campaign to restore inheritance rights for Muslim women, in response to concerns about the proposed Uniform Civil Code. Rahmani was appointed as one of three regional secretaries for the initiative, alongside Ahmad Wali Faisal Rahmani and Yasin Ali Usmani. The campaign highlighted how daughters, mothers, and widows were often denied their rightful Islamic shares in property.

=== Activism ===
In December 2019, amid widespread opposition to the Citizenship (Amendment) Act (CAA) and the proposed National Register of Citizens (NRC), Rahmani organized a mass protest in Malegaon under the banner of the Dastoor-e-Hind Bachao Committee. The rally, supported by the Vanchit Bahujan Aghadi (VBA) and Republican Party of India (RPI), drew over 60,000 participants and led to the closure of shops and schools in the area. Speaking at the rally, Rahmani invoked the legacy of freedom fighters and described the CAA as a divisive law, calling on citizens to defend the Constitution even at personal cost.

Rahmani initially led efforts to guide Malegaon residents in gathering essential identity documents in preparation for the NRC. However, following the enactment of the CAA, he urged a shift from documentation to public protest, warning that such measures could be used to disenfranchise legitimate citizens.

In January 2020, Rahmani expressed religious objections to a women-led protest against the CAA and NRC in Malegaon, stating that it was inappropriate for women to protest in public without gender segregation. The protest, organized by Janata Dal (Secular) corporator Shan-e-Hind, had planned to feature Jamia Millia Islamia students Aysha Renna and Ladeeda Sakhlon, who later withdrew citing security concerns. Rahmani denied any involvement in their withdrawal and clarified that his concerns were purely based on religious grounds.

=== Potential candidacy and withdrawal ===
In April 2024, speculation arose on social media regarding Rahmani’s potential candidacy from the Dhule Lok Sabha constituency in the 2024 Indian general election. Several political figures reportedly approached him to contest the election, and Rahmani acknowledged that he was in contact with party representatives but had not made any decision at the time.

Later that month, on 23 April, Rahmani officially announced his withdrawal from political consideration, stating that while many had encouraged him to contest in order to counter communal politics, he chose to step back for personal and religious reasons. He emphasized his continued commitment to educational, social, and religious work, and suggested the formation of a pressure group to engage constructively with local politics.

=== Protest against Waqf Act 2025 ===
In May 2025, Rahmani termed as a "success" a nationwide symbolic protest against the Waqf (Amendment) Act, 2025, organized by the All India Muslim Personal Law Board. As part of the protest, lights were turned off for 15 minutes in several towns and cities, including major participation from institutions like Darul Uloom Deoband, madrassas, and households across Uttar Pradesh. The protest aimed to highlight opposition to the law, which was seen by critics as infringing on religious autonomy and violating constitutional secularism.

== Views ==
=== Criticism of Waqf Amendment Bill ===
In November 2024, Rahmani criticized the Waqf Amendment Bill and urged political leaders such as Nitish Kumar and Chandrababu Naidu to clarify their stance. He asserted that Muslim voters had played a role in their political success and warned that ignoring community concerns could affect future support. His remarks drew media attention and sparked debate on the involvement of religious leaders in political discourse.

=== Comments on Nikah Halala ===
In August 2018, Rahmani stated that the practice of so-called Nikah Halala—as portrayed in public discourse—was not rooted in Islam and had been misrepresented to malign the faith. He criticized how the issue had been framed in media and legal debates, calling such portrayals "a distortion" of Islamic teachings. Rahmani said that using "halala" as a justification for injustice against women was both un-Islamic and sinful, emphasizing that Islam provided no room for such practices. He made these remarks amid ongoing hearings in the Supreme Court on the legal status of Nikah Halala and polygamy in India.

=== Views on Hijab and Women's Rights ===
In February 2022, Rahmani urged Muslim women to actively counter misconceptions about the practice of hijab. He encouraged women to explain that hijab is not a symbol of oppression but one of honour, dignity, and religious identity. He stated that Islam allows women to step out of their homes while maintaining modesty and respect. His statement was made in the context of growing public discourse around hijab in India.

=== Position on the Babri Masjid Dispute ===
In February 2018, Rahmani reiterated the Board’s official position on the Babri Masjid dispute during its executive meeting in Hyderabad. Reading out the Board’s Urdu statement, he affirmed that once a mosque is built, it remains a mosque "till Qayamat" (the Day of Judgment), and its land cannot be sold, gifted, or repurposed. The Board rejected proposals—such as one reportedly supported by member Salman Nadwi—that suggested building a Ram temple at the disputed site, calling such a compromise impermissible (haram) under Islamic law. Rahmani clarified that while the matter was before the courts and the Board would respect the judicial process, Muslims could not voluntarily surrender mosque land, as this would contradict Sharia. The Board also noted that past negotiation efforts had failed because they demanded unilateral concessions from the Muslim community.

=== Advocacy on Legal Reforms in Muslim Personal Law ===
Rahmani has been an active voice in legal matters concerning Muslim personal law. He has consistently advocated for the preservation of Islamic legal traditions and opposed legislative interventions that overlook the guidance of religious scholars. Notably, in 2018, he opposed the draft bill on triple talaq (then titled the Muslim Women (Protection of Rights on Marriage) Bill, 2017), urging the central government to withdraw the bill or send it to a parliamentary select committee. Rahmani criticized the proposed bail clause as inadequate and stated that the government had not meaningfully consulted Islamic scholars or community representatives. He emphasized the importance of respecting the views of religious authorities when legislating on matters of Muslim personal law.

== Literary works ==
Rahmani launched the Urdu monthly magazine Gulshan, which focused on Islamic thought and social issues. He also authored several Urdu books, including:

- Tasawwuf Ki Ahmiyat
- Rahbar-e-Fann-e-Khitabat
- Diyār-e-Murshid Mein Chand Din
- Yād-e-Murshid
- Maktūbāt-e-Murshid
- Ifādāt-e-Murshid
- Irshād-e-Murshid
- Suhbat-e-Murshid
- Tasawwuf wa Suluk Ki Haqīqat
- Aham Sifat Baraye Salikīn
- Mutala'a Ki Sarguzisht
- Jin Ka Naqsh-e-Pa Chiragh
- Nuqūsh-e-Akabir
