= Mohammad Yunus (Indian politician) =

Indian politician (1884–1952)

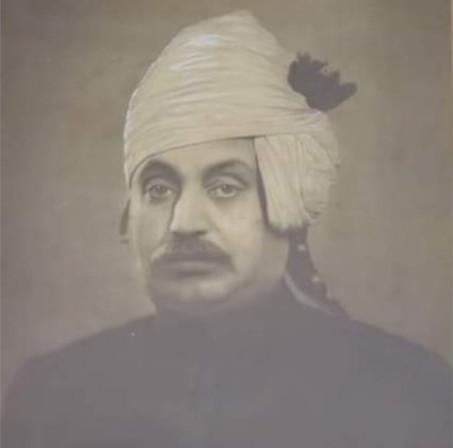

1st Premier of Bihar Province
- In office 1 April 1937 – 19 July 1937
- Governor: Sir Maurice Garnier Hallett
- Succeeded by: Shri Krishna Sinha

Personal details
- Born: 4 May 1884 Penhara, Bengal Presidency, British India
- Died: 13 May 1952 (aged 68) London, United Kingdom
- Party: Muslim Independent Party

Mohammad Yunus (4 May 1884 – 13 May 1952) was the first Premier of British India's Bihar Province. During his career, the heads of provincial governments were called Prime Ministers. He governed for three months in 1937, during the state's first democratic election.

== Early life and education ==
Mohammad Yunus, the younger of two brothers, was born on 4 May 1884, in Penhara, a village located in Patna in the Bengal Presidency. He belonged to a Muslim family that traced its descent back to the Sufi saint Malik Ibrahim Bayu, also known as Mallick caste. He was the son of Ali Hassan Mukhtar, an advocate. His grandfather was Mohammad Azam, who served as District Judge of Munger (Monghyr).

Yunus started studying Urdu and Islamic studies from Shah Saheb from Amthua, Jehanabad, who later founded the Amthua Khanqah. He continued his education at the Patna Collegiate School, later traveling to the United Kingdom in the 1920s to continue his education and eventually pass the bar at Middle Temple, London.

== Political career ==
Yunus' followed the principle of Muttahda Qaumiat (United Nationhood) which was in contrast with the Two Nation Theory of the All-India Muslim League. He was a delegate at the 1908 Lahore session but later left the party.

He later became a member of the Subject Committee at the 24th session of the Indian National Congress held in Lahore in 1909, serving with Syed Hasan Imam, Deep Narayan Singh, Anugrah Narayan Sinha, Kishan Sahay and Mr. Parmeswar.

Yunus also served briefly as All India Secretary of the Muslim League. He became member of the Imperial Legislative Council in 1916, at the age of 32. Yunus became member of Bihar and Orissa Legislative Council in 1921. He was twice-elected a member of Patna Municipal Board, in 1917 and remained on its board from 1917 until 1923.

He was elected to the position of the Chief Whip of the Democratic Party of Bihar and Orissa in 1921 and remained in the post until 1926. He was later elected as a member of the Bihar and Orissa Legislative Council in 1932. He presented a proposal for a new constitution to Viceroy Chelmsford and Edwin Montagu, the Secretary of State for India that would be included within the Montagu–Chelmsford Reforms.

Yunus represented the Bihar Muslim Association and Bihar Landholder's Association as Chief Spokesman before the 1928 Simon Commission. He formed the Muslim Independent Party in 1936 along with Abul Mahasin Muhammad Sajjad to represent Muslims disillusioned with the Muslim League and the Congress.

=== 1937 Indian provincial elections ===
He resisted efforts by Mohammad Ali Jinnah to merge the Muslim Independent Party with the Muslim League before the 1937 Indian provincial elections. The Muslim Independent Party ran in the 1937 election with the Congress on a seat sharing basis and became the second largest party in the Bihar Province Legislative Assembly. Yunus became a member of Bihar Legislative Council again in 1937 on the Muslim Independent Party ticket from West Patna (Rural) Constituency. The Muslim Independent Party won 20 seats of 40 seats reserved for Muslims and the Congress won 4, Yunus wanted to form an coalition government with the Congress to show to the Muslim League that Hindus and Muslims, two largest religious groups, could exist with equal dignity and rights. However, the Congress rejected Yunus's proposal and attempted to form a government alone. He took the oath as the Prime Minister of Bihar on 1 April 1937.

Yunus' government consisted of Abdul Wahab Khan as the revenue minister, Kumar Ajit Singh Deo as the minister for local self-government, and Babu Guru Sahay Lal as the river development minister. He also offered a ministerial position to Jagjivan Ram, who declined under pressure from the Congress.

Kazi Ahmad Hussain, who was Nazim of Imarat-e-Sharia at that time and was also an important leader of Muslim Independent Party, had mixed feelings about the formation of the government. His view was that forming a government without the participation of a party which represented the second largest constituency of the country could lead to a serious divide between the two communities.

During his tenure as Chief Minister, the legislative assembly enacted a number of significant motions. Bihar Band (Hartal) agitators were detained in front of his residence ("Dar-ul-Mallik") on Frazer Road in Patna on the second day of his tenure. Then youth leader Jayaprakash Narayan harshly criticized Barrister Yunus's acceptance of the governor's invitation to form the government. His Congress Socialist Party continued protests against the Muslim Independent Party government because it did not have a majority in the house.

Following the fall of his minority administration, the first Congress Ministry, headed by Premier Shri Krishna Sinha and deputy premier Anugrah Narayan Sinha was formed on 20 July 1937.

=== Post partition ===
After the partition, he played an active part in the movement to amend the Custodian Ordinance and worked shoulder-to-shoulder with Jamiat-e-Ulema on this issue. His suggestions found a place in the Minto-Morley Reforms.

Mohammad Yunus actively helped J. B. Kripalani and Mahamaya Prasad found the Kisan Mazdoor Praja Party (KMPP) in 1951. Mahamaya Prasad became state president of the party in Bihar and a member of the legislative council. In 1951, Yunus advised Maulana Manzoor Ejazi to refuse the proposal of the Congress party to nominate him to the Bihar Legislative Council. The next day, after Maulana's refusal, Mahamaya Prasad accepted the nomination from the party and joined the legislative council. In the 1951 election, the KMPP emerged as the third largest party of India after the Congress and the Socialist Party. The KMPP and the Socialist party later merged to form the Praja Socialist Party.

== Other activities ==
He was a Member of the Indian Institute of Science, Bangalore for 6 years. He was also the founding President of the All India Mail-Milap Association which was formed with the objective of promoting Hindu–Muslim unity on a social level, beyond political Interest and limitations.

He was the Secretary of Annie Besant's Theosophical Society.

== Activities of Mohammad Yunus' sons ==
His eldest son, Mohammad Yaseen Yunus, inherited his father's judicial heritage while staying out of politics, died in 1947 at the age of 40 while serving as a standing counsel for the Government of Bihar. Most of his political and business legacy was passed down to his younger son, Mohammad Yaqub Yunus (founding president of Bihar Muslim Majlis Mushawarat). Dar-ul-Mallik, his mansion, was afterwards turned into the Grand Hotel, while another portion became an Oriental Bank which was eventually demolished in the late 1990s. His grandson, Baber Yunus, who manages the Yunus Construction Company in Patna, erected the Grand Apartment in its place.

In addition to serving as standing counsel for the Government of Bihar in the Patna High Court, Muhammad Yasin Yunus, his eldest son, served as his father's political secretary, particularly during the key period of the Muslim Independent Party's formation and during his father's tenure as Chief Minister. He was appointed as standing counsel to the Bihar government in 1945 and received the letter appointing him as a judge in the Patna High Court. He died in 1946.

Mohammad Yaqub Yunus, a Patna High Court advocate, was a younger son who founded the All India Muslim Majlis-e- Mushawarat in 1967. He also held the position of President of the Aligarh Muslim University Old Boys Association in Bihar for a very long time and led the Aligarh Movement when the AMU came under scrutiny during the rule of Indira Gandhi.

== Academic and judicial affairs ==
Yunus moved to England in 1903 to join the Society of the Middle Temple, and was admitted to the bar on 26 January 1906. He was admitted as a Barrister of the High Court of Justice of London on 27 January. After just a brief period of practice in England, he returned to India in April 1906, and at the age of 22, he enrolled as an advocate in the Calcutta High Court Bar. In 1906, he began his legal career in the Patna District Court before rising to the position of Senior Advocate. He actively contested matters in the Privy Council of England, the Federal Court of Delhi, the Patna High Court, and the High Court of Calcutta.

== Personal life ==
His first wife was Bibian Zeenatunissa, a descendant of Abdul Jabbar of Mirzapur, Uttar Pradesh. who died on 19 March 1924. On 5 October 1924, he married his second wife, the eldest daughter of the late Habibur Rahman of Irki, Jehanabad, Gaya, who was working as an assistant civil surgeon at the time. No children were born from this marriage.

== Poetry ==
On 29 December 1944, Yunus had a heart attack. During his rehabilitation, particularly during his extended stay in Mussoorie in 1945, he started writing poetry. His best-known poems include "Marsiya," on the passing of Birbal Lal, the justice Manohar Lal's son, "Payam-e-Muhabbat," about the harmony between Hindus and Muslims, and "Kalam-e-Yunus," a letter to young people.

== Death ==
He died of a heart attack while walking down a street in London on 13 May 1952. He was buried in Brookwood Muslim Graveyard in London.

== Legacy ==
On 13 May 2012, Yunus' great-grandson. Mohammad Kashif Yunus, organized a conference titled "Mohammad Yunus: Hayat Wa Khidmat," which was attended by Mr. Nand Kishore Yadav, the Road Construction minister of Bihar government. At the conference, the Chief Minister of Bihar, Mr. Nitish Kumar, announced the observation of an annual memorial of Yunus called "Rajkiya Samaroh" on 4 May, Yunus' birthday. The first observation of the memorial took place on 4 May 2013 and has been in practice ever since.

The last known 'Rajkiya Samaroh' was organised to commemorate Mohammad Yunus on 4 May 2023, at Sri Krishna Memorial Hall, Patna, Bihar. The attendees included the Chief minister of Bihar, Mr. Nitish Kumar and the Deputy Chief minister of Bihar, Tejaswi Yadav along with Mohammad Yunus' grand son Baber Yunus, great-granddaughter, Huma Yunus, great-grandsons named Yasar Yunus, Kashif Yunus, Ashhar Yunus and Shahzeb Yunus respectively. Additionally, his great-great-grandchildren named Ferheen Yunus, Shahoon Yunus and Yashfa Yunus were in attendance as well for the ceremony.
