= Minnatullah Rahmani =

Indian Sunni Muslim scholar

Mawlāna Minnatullah Rahmani

First General Secretary of All India Muslim Personal Law Board
- In office 28 December 1972 – 20 March 1991

4th Ameer-e-Shariat of Imarat-e-Shariah, Bihar Odisha and Jharkhand
- In office 1957–1991
- Preceded by: Shah Qamaruddin Qadri
- Succeeded by: Abdur Rahman Darbhangvi

Personal life
- Born: 7 April 1913 Munger, British India
- Died: 20 March 1991 (aged 77)
- Children: Wali Rahmani
- Parent: Muhammad Ali Mungeri (father)
- Education: Darul Uloom Nadwatul Ulama; Darul Uloom Deoband

Religious life
- Religion: Islam
- Denomination: Sunni Hanafi
- Movement: Deobandi

Minnatullah Rahmani (7 April 1913 – 20 March 1991) was an Indian Sunni Muslim scholar who served as the first General Secretary of All India Muslim Personal Law Board. He was an alumnus of Darul Uloom Nadwatul Ulama and Darul Uloom Deoband, and a member of Bihar Legislative Assembly. He also served as the General Secretary of the Jamiat Ulama Bihar. His father Muhammad Ali Mungeri was the founder of Nadwatul Ulama and his son Wali Rahmani established the Rahmani30 institute.

== Biography ==
Minnatullah Rahmani was born in Munger on 7 April 1913. His father Muhammad Ali Mungeri was a founding figure of the Nadwatul Ulama in Lucknow.

Rahmani received his primary education in Munger and went to Hyderabad, where he studied Arabic grammar, syntax and logic with Mufti Abd al-Lateef. He enrolled at the Darul Uloom Nadwatul Ulama and studied there for four years. In 1349 AH, he moved to Darul Uloom Deoband, where he studied Sahih Bukhari with Hussain Ahmad Madani and graduated from there in 1352 AH. His other teachers included Asghar Hussain Deobandi and Muhammad Shafi.

In 1935, Rahmani was appointed the General Secretary of the Jamiat Ulama Bihar. Abul Muhasin Muhammad Sajjad founded the Muslim Independent Party in 1935 and Rahmani was appointed its member. Through it, he was elected as a member of Bihar Legislative Assembly in 1937. He was appointed the Sajjada Nashin of Khanqah-e-Rahmani, Munger in 1361 AH and a member of the executive council of Darul Uloom Deoband in 1955, a post he served until his death. Alongside Muhammad Tayyib Qasmi, he played a key role in establishing the All India Muslim Personal Law Board and was appointed its first General Secretary on 28 December 1972, in the inception meeting. In 1964, he participated in the World Muslim Congress as a delegate of India. In 1945, Rahmani re-established the Jamia Rahmania, a well known madrassa in Munger, India. He died on 20 March 1991.

== Legacy ==
Rahmani's son Wali Rahmani established the Rahmani30 and formerly served as the general secretary of the All India Muslim Personal Law Board. Shah Imran Hasan wrote his biography Hayat-e Rahmani: Maulana Minnatullah Rahmani ki Zindagi ka Ilmi aur Tarikhi Mutala’a (English: The Life of Rahmani: A Study of Maulana Minatullah Rahmani’s Scholarly and Historical Legacy) which has a foreword from Akhtarul Wasey.

== Bibliography ==
- Amini, Noor Alam Khalil (February 2017). "Mawlāna Jalīl-ul-Qadar Aalim-o-Qā'id Amīr-e-Shariat: Hadhrat Mawlāna Sayyid Minatullah Rahmani - Chand Yaadein" [The Great Scholar and Leader, Amīr-e-Shariat: Hadhrat Mawlāna Sayyid Minatullah Rahmani - Few Memories]. Pas-e-Marg-e-Zindah (in Urdu) (5 ed.). Deoband: Idara Ilm-o-Adab. pp. 214–238.
- Rizwi, Syed Mehboob (1981). "Maulana Sayyid Minat Allah Rahmani". History of the Dar al-Ulum Deoband. Vol. 2. Translated by Murtaz Husain F Quraishi. Deoband: Darul Uloom Deoband. pp. 121–123.
- Azhar, Mohd (2005). Maulana Minnatullah Rahmani: analytical study of his life and religio-intellectual contributions (PhD). Aligarh Muslim University. hdl:10603/57173.
- Nadvi, Muḥammad Vaqāruddīn Lat̤īfī (2018). Savāniḥ Ḥaẓrat Amīr-i Sharīʻat : Amīr-i Sharīʻat Ḥaẓrat Maulānā Minnatulláh Raḥmānī kī ḥayāt va k̲h̲idmāt (in Urdu). Khagaria: Maktaba Gyarah Sitare.
