= Maruti Manpade =

Indian Communist leader (1956–2020)

Maruti Manpade (1956-2020) was a Communist leader in India who campaigned on a wide variety of causes such as farmers’ issues, implementation of Swaminathan Commission recommendations, Devadasi women rights and Dalit rights. He was a successful organizer who led agitations against privatization of electricity, the controversial Citizenship (Amendment) Act, 2019 and National Register of Citizens, land theft, and exploitation of workers. He was a member of the State Secretariat of Karnataka of the Communist Party of India (Marxist). He was also a member of the executive committee of All India Kisan Sabha (AIKS), the farmers’ union affiliated to CPI(M). He contested in Lok Sabha and Karnataka Assembly elections for a combined total of four times and managed to get a significant share of the votes each time. He also contested in local self-government elections twice and was elected to the District Panchayat in 1986.

== Personal life ==
Maruti Manpade was born in Ambalga village of Alanda Taluk in Kalaburagi district. His parents, Ratnamma and Tukarama, were agricultural workers. He was a graduate and joined the Health Department of the Government of Karnataka as a health worker. He resigned his job in 1986, and was soon elected to the District Panchayat, marking his entry into professional politics.

== Political Movements ==
=== Peasant agitations ===
Manpade was a member of the executive committee of the All India Kisan Sabha and the State President of the Karnataka Regional Farmers' Union since 1995, he has fought to formulate pro-farmers policies in the state. He was the State Vice President of the Karnataka Regional Farmers' Union.

Manpade was in the Karalingheshwar Youth Farmers' Union for ten years, and his first major intervention happened in 1983, when the farmers’ struggle was aggravated following the Navalgunda farmer massacre. Manpade was instrumental in organizing a significant march in protest against this massacre, from Naragunda to Bangalore. In the days that followed, Manpade led a struggle of Red gram growers, which led to the establishment of a Red gram board. As a result of their tireless struggle, red gram began to be procured at a reasonable price. He has also agitated for the rights of sugarcane growers.

He also fought for implementation of M S Swaminathan report for betterment of farmers and their lives.

Under Manpade's leadership, Karnataka Rajya Raitha Sangha fought against the displacement of Adivasis from forests and against unjust land acquisition laws. Before his death, Manpade was involved in organizing the resistance in Karnataka against the controversial farm bills, which were passed in 2020.

=== Dalit, OBC and Muslim rights ===
One of the landmark struggles against caste oppression in Karnataka was carried out by Manpade by organizing Devadasi women in the state, and equipping them to fight to improve their living conditions. He also led the fight for Bagar Hukam land deeds and housing for the poor. Manpade was a main leader of the Dalit Hakkugala Samiti, whose work for the rights of Dalits and the Exploited and for equality in society deserves praise.

Manpade was a committed opponent of communal policies and stood strongly for the rights of minorities. He opposed implementation of NRC-CAA, and organized resistance to the controversial policies in Kalaburagi. Several protests were held against NRC under his leadership.

=== Economic struggles ===
Manpade consistently strived to implement the Dr Nanjudappa Committee, who advocated the need for a separate board for development in Hyderabad and Karnataka and improving the human development index.

He successfully fought for the establishment of a Central University in Kalaburgi to improve the educational level, and has campaigned fiercely against the privatization of electricity. He has been in jail multiple times during this fight.

He was actively involved in the fight for the construction of a new hospital in Kalaburgi, for providing infrastructure and for the recruitment of specialist medical staff.

As a result of his efforts to implement proper pay for contract workers in the state, millions of contract workers working in state government departments have been provided wages as stipulated under the minimum wage.

Manpade founded the Karnataka State Gram Panchayat Employees' Union in 1989, and became the founder president of the association. The Union managed to implement wage hike, and promotion and service rules for thousands of gram panchayat workers in the state.

=== Jail terms ===
Manpade has been arrested and jailed many times, as a result of his labour and farmer activism. He has spent over 150 days in jail for political crimes.

== Death ==
Manpade died while undergoing treatment for pneumonia and COVID-related complications in a private hospital at Solapur, Maharashtra. Manpade's lifelong struggles were acknowledged by prominent leaders in the state.
