= Anisur Rahman Qasmi =

Indian Sunni Islamic scholar (born 1960)

Mawlana, Mufti Anisur Rahman Qasmi
- انیس الرحمن قاسمی
- Born: Mohammad Anisur Rahman; 6 July 1960 (age 66); Katahari, West Champaran district, Bihar, India
- Occupations: Islamic scholar, writer, community leader
- Known for: Leadership in Imarat-e-Shariah, Islamic jurisprudence

Academic background
- Education: Darul Uloom Deoband

Anisur Rahman Qasmi (born 6 July 1960), also written as Aneesur Rahman Qasmi, is an Indian Sunni Islamic scholar, writer, and community leader from Bihar. He has held various senior positions in religious and community organisations, including roles connected to Imarat-e-Shariah (Bihar, Odisha, and Jharkhand) and the All India Milli Council, where he serves as Vice President. A graduate of Darul Uloom Deoband, he is known for his writings and lectures on Islamic jurisprudence and public issues. Qasmi has authored several works in Urdu and Arabic on subjects such as Islamic law and social ethics, and has been active in community affairs, including work with the Bihar Haj Committee and initiatives for Muslim welfare.

== Early life and education ==
Anisur Rahman Qasmi was born in Katahari, West Champaran district, Bihar, India, on 6 July 1960. His father was Muhammad Abul Kalam. He received his early education at Madrasa Riyaz-ul-Uloom in his hometown. He graduated from Darul Uloom Deoband in the traditional dars-e-nizami course in 1978 and then completed a one-year specialization in Islamic jurisprudence (ifta) in 1979.

== Career ==
After completing his studies, Qasmi joined Imarat-e-Shariah, based in Phulwari Sharif, Patna. He taught at the institution's Al-Ma'had Al-Aali Lit-Tadreeb Fi Al-Qada Wa Al-Ifta (Higher Institute for Judicial and Fatwa Training). He served as Naib Qazi-e-Shariat (Deputy Islamic Judge) in the central Darul Qaza of Imarat-e-Shariah and held administrative responsibilities.

Qasmi has also held several significant positions, including Secretary of Imarat Shariah Educational and Welfare Trust, Treasurer of Al-Ma'had Trust, and Member of the Board of Darul Uloom Al-Islamia Imarat Shariah Trust. He is a founding member of the All India Muslim Personal Law Board and the Islamic Fiqh Academy, India, and has been affiliated with the All India Milli Council, the Central Islamic Development Bank (Jeddah) as a zonal member, and has served as Vice President of Wifaq-ul-Madaris Al-Islamia of Imarat-e-Shariah, Patna. As of 2025, he continues to serve as Vice President of the All India Milli Council, and is also the Chairman of the Abul Kalam Research Foundation.

=== Role in Bihar State Haj Committee ===
In 2009, Qasmi was elected Chairman of the Bihar Haj Committee, where he oversaw logistical arrangements for pilgrims, noting in 2010 that approximately 5,575 pilgrims from Bihar had registered for the pilgrimage and expressing his prayers for their safe journey. During his tenure as Chairman of the Bihar State Haj Committee, Qasmi played a significant role in improving the travel arrangements for Haj pilgrims from Bihar. In 2012, he oversaw the introduction of direct flights from Gaya International Airport to Medina, which significantly reduced travel time for pilgrims who previously had to transit via Kolkata. He raised concerns about the early flight timings, arguing that pilgrims traveling overnight from Patna faced hardship. His efforts led to a rescheduling of flights in 2012, with departures shifted to later times, improving convenience for pilgrims. He also highlighted broader concerns regarding infrastructure and equitable services for Haj pilgrims from Bihar.

In 2011, Qasmi commented on the disqualification of a councillor in Bihar who lost her seat for exceeding the two-child norm imposed by the Bihar Municipal Act. He argued that selectively enforcing such rules was unjust and a violation of human rights, emphasizing that, under Islamic teachings, preventing childbirth is impermissible. He expressed concern that such measures could negatively impact Muslim representation in governance. He has been active in public religious discourse and community initiatives. In 2013, he announced that Imarat-e-Shariah would launch a comprehensive website, islamicshariah.in, to provide information on Shariat laws, fatwas, and Islamic teachings, aiming to help younger generations access authentic religious knowledge online. During the COVID-19 pandemic in 2020, he issued guidance for mosque congregations, advising worshippers to maintain social distancing, perform ablutions at home, and carry personal prayer mats. He has advocated for Muslim community welfare, including supporting reservations to promote socio-economic upliftment. In 2015, he proposed a centralized qurbani (sacrifice) scheme to prevent fraud related to animal sacrifices during Eid, though this proposal sparked debate among other Islamic scholars.

=== Controversies ===
In March 2025, Anisur Rahman Qasmi was named as a claimant to the position of Ameer-e-Shariat of Imarat-e-Shariah by a faction within the organisation. This faction announced the removal of Ahmad Wali Faisal Rahmani, citing concerns related to nationality, religious qualifications, and organisational matters. However, Rahmani and his supporters rejected this move and asserted that he continues as Ameer-e-Shariat.

== Views ==
In 2021, Qasmi cautioned that changing the traditional method of electing the Ameer-e-Shariat could cause divisions and stressed maintaining established procedures.

In 2025, he urged Bihar Chief Minister Nitish Kumar to oppose the Waqf Amendment Bill, saying Muslims hoped Kumar would support “the truth” and expressed disappointment with JD(U) leaders backing the bill.

In 2014, Qasmi called the Shahi Imam of Delhi’s refusal to invite Prime Minister Narendra Modi to his son’s dastarbandi “immature,” arguing that hospitality required inviting the Prime Minister despite personal views.

In 2015, as general secretary of Imarat-e-Shariah, he supported Nitish Kumar’s alliances, praising initiatives like scholarships for Muslims, Urdu teacher recruitment, and madrasa funding.

In 2024, he joined Muslim leaders in condemning the Citizenship Amendment Act (CAA), calling it a violation of constitutional principles of equality and secularism.

== Literary works ==
Qasmi has authored several books in Urdu and Arabic on Islamic jurisprudence and other subjects. Some of his works include:

- Tahara Ke Ahkam wa Masail (Rules and Issues of Purity)
- Khula ka Islami Tareeqa (Islamic Procedure of Khula Divorce)
- Libas ke Sharai Ahkam (Islamic Rules of Clothing)
- Ghiza ke Sharai Ahkam (Islamic Rules of Food)
- Tameerat ke Sharai Ahkam (Islamic Rules of Construction)
- Musannifeen-e-Zindan (Prison writers)
- Islami Huqooq (Islamic Rights)
- Makārim Akhlaq
- Khutbat-e-Juma (Friday Sermons in Urdu)
- Al-Sheikh Ibn Taymiyyah wa Afkaruhu (Arabic)
- Akhlaqiyat al-Harb fi al-Sirah al-Nabawiyyah (Arabic)
- Hayāt-e-Sajjad (a biography on Abul Mahasin Muhammad Sajjad)
- Maqalat-e-Sajjad

== See also ==
- Imarat-e-Shariah
- Darul Uloom Deoband
