= Ahmad Wali Faisal Rahmani =

Indian Muslim community leader (born 1975)

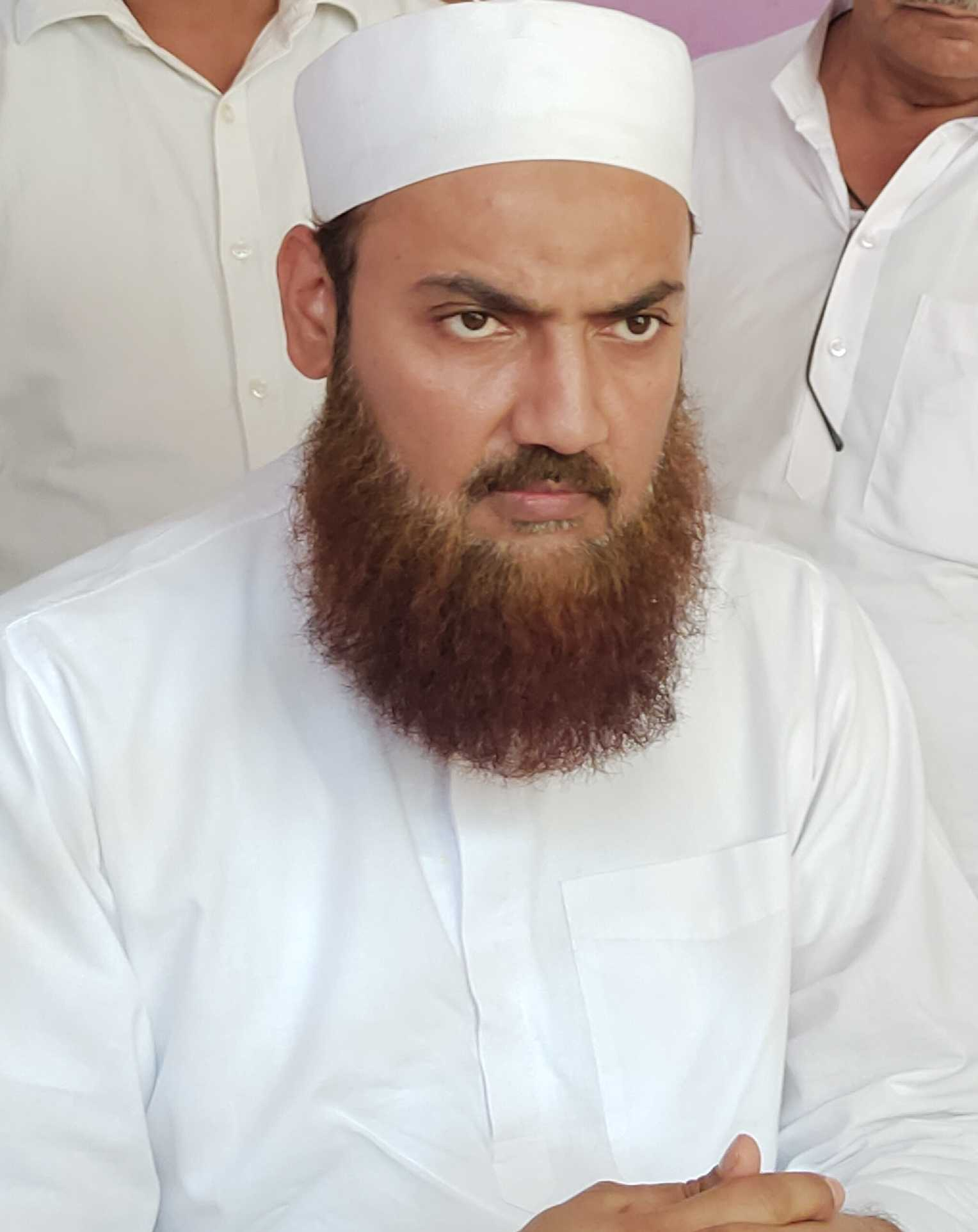
- Rahmani in Sheikhpura, Bihar

Ameer-e-Shariat of Imarat-e-Shariah (Bihar, Odisha, Jharkhand)
- Incumbent
- Assumed office 9 October 2021
- Preceded by: Wali Rahmani

Sajjada Nashin of Khanqah-e-Rahmani, Munger
- Incumbent
- Assumed office 9 April 2021
- Preceded by: Wali Rahmani

Secretary of All India Muslim Personal Law Board
- In office 3 June 2023 – 25 November 2024
- Title: Ameer-e-Shariat VIII

Personal life
- Born: 12 May 1975 (age 51) Munger, Bihar, India
- Parent: Wali Rahmani (father)
- Education: Jamia Rahmani, Munger; Al-Azhar University; University of California
- Known for: Ameer-e-Shariat of Imarat-e-Shariah (Bihar, Odisha, Jharkhand), Sajjada Nashin of Khanqah-e-Rahmani, Munger
- Occupation: Islamic scholar, religious leader

Religious life
- Religion: Sunni Islam

Senior posting
- Predecessor: Wali Rahmani

Ahmad Wali Faisal Rahmani (born 12 May 1975) is an Indian Muslim community leader. He is the eighth Ameer-e-Shariat of Imarat-e-Shariah, an Islamic organization operating in Bihar, Odisha, and Jharkhand. He is also the Sajjada Nashin (spiritual successor) of Khanqah Rahmani, a khanqah in Munger, Bihar, succeeding Wali Rahmani.

== Early life and education ==
Ahmad Wali Faisal Rahmani was born on 12 May 1975 in Munger to Wali Rahmani. He received his early education at Jamia Rahmani in Munger, under the supervision of his father. He later moved to the United States for higher studies, where he completed a degree in engineering from the University of California. Following his graduation, he briefly taught at the University of California and then joined the software company Accenture, where he was a manager. He later took a two-year leave from work to pursue Arabic language and literature studies in Egyptian villages near Al-Azhar University, before returning to the United States.

== Career ==
Before returning to India, Rahmani worked in the United States. He was associated with the University of California and worked at Adobe Systems and BP. He later joined Accenture, where he had a managerial role. In addition to his professional work, he is associated with Jamia Rahmani (in Munger), where he is involved in managing and directly overseeing teaching Arabic language through online classes aimed at Quran memorization students as well as studies for middle school and high school students and a program for college preparation.

In 2015, he was appointed as the Sajjada Nashin of Khanqah-e-Rahmani by his father, Wali Rahmani. His formal Sajjada Nashini ceremony took place on 9 April 2021. Following the death of his father on 3 April 2021, he was elected as the eighth Ameer-e-Shariat of Imarat-e-Shariah on 9 October 2021. His election was conducted through voting, a departure from the previous practice of consensus-based selection. He secured 347 votes against 197 votes received by his closest rival, Anisur Rahman Qasmi.

As Ameer-e-Shariat, Rahmani has focused on modernizing Imarat-e-Shariah while maintaining its traditional role in religious guidance. His initiatives include the expansion of Darul Qaza (Islamic arbitration centers), strengthening educational institutions affiliated with Imarat-e-Shariah, protecting Waqf properties and addressing land reform issues, implementing self-sufficient maktab (primary Islamic schools) programs, and enhancing the use of technology in religious and educational activities. Rahmani has emphasized the need for technical education among madrasa students. Under his leadership, Imarat-e-Shariah introduced digital tools to modernize Islamic education.

Rahmani was elected secretary of the All India Muslim Personal Law Board in June 2023 and resigned in November 2024.

== Political and social stances ==
In January 2020, Rahmani supported the anti-CAA protests in Bihar, including the Subzibagh demonstration in Patna. Alongside other community leaders, he emphasized that the protests were aimed at protecting constitutional values rather than being driven by religious identity. Rahmani raised concerns that the Citizenship Amendment Act (CAA), National Register of Citizens (NRC), and National Population Register (NPR) could undermine India's secular fabric and disproportionately impact marginalized communities.

In September 2023, Rahmani, as a secretary of the All India Muslim Personal Law Board (AIMPLB), was involved in efforts to ensure women's rightful share in inheritance under Sharia law. The initiative aimed to address concerns over women being denied inheritance rights and was part of a broader social reform effort by the Board.

In March 2024, Rahmani, with other Muslim leaders, signed a joint statement opposing the Citizenship Amendment Act (CAA) 2019. The statement argued that the law violates Article 14 of the Indian Constitution by selectively granting citizenship based on religion and excluding Muslims. It also criticized the timing of its implementation before general elections, calling it politically motivated.

In June 2025, Rahmani, as Ameer-e-Shariat, publicly opposed the Waqf (Amendment) Act, 2025, (which was to override Islamic management of donated lands for Muslim institutions and mosques) describing it as a threat to religious autonomy and waqf properties. He stated that the law could allow state interference in religious endowments and heritage sites, and claimed that some BJP Members of Parliament had expressed support for his stance. Addressing the “Waqf Bachao, Dastoor Bachao” rally at Gandhi Maidan, Patna, he said the Act violated fundamental rights enshrined in the Indian Constitution and undermined established legal principles. The event, organised by Imarat-e-Shariah with participation from opposition leaders including Tejashwi Yadav, Salman Khurshid, and Kanhaiya Kumar, drew thousands of attendees. Rahmani called the legislation "draconian" and demanded its rollback, asserting that the movement was a constitutional and peaceful expression of the community’s will.

== See also ==
- List of Deobandis
