= Imarat-e-Shariah =

Muslim socio-religious organization in India

Imarat-e-Shariah Bihar, Odisha, and Jharkhand
- Urdu: امارت شرعیہ بہار، اڑیسہ و جھارکھنڈ
- Formation: 26 June 1921; 105 years ago
- Founders: Abul Mahasin Muhammad Sajjad; Badruddin Qadri; Abul Kalam Azad; Muhammad Ali Mungeri; Shah Mohiuddin Qadri; Shah Habibul Haq
- Type: Religious organization
- Purpose: Religious, judicial, and educational services for Muslims.
- Headquarters: Phulwari Sharif, Patna, India
- Region served: India
- Members: Estimated in millions
- Official language: Urdu, English
- Ameer-e-Shariat: Ahmad Wali Faisal Rahmani
- Website: www.imaratshariah.com

Imarat-e-Shariah Bihar, Odisha, and Jharkhand (formerly Imarat-e-Shariah Bihar and Orissa) is a Muslim socio-religious organization in India, based on the principles of Islam and Shariah. Established on 26 June 1921 (19 Shawwal 1339 AH) in Patna, Bihar, it aims to provide religious guidance, promote Islamic education, and facilitate a Shariah-based arbitration system. The organization follows the Hanafi school of Islamic jurisprudence and primarily serves the Muslim communities in Bihar, Odisha, and Jharkhand.

== History and background ==
=== Establishment of Imarat ===
As the Mughal Empire declined and the British began consolidating their control over India, Muslims faced increasing oppression, restrictions on religious practices, and attacks on Islamic traditions. In 1824, Shah Abdul Aziz Dehlavi issued a fatwa declaring India as Dar al-Harb (abode of war), emphasizing the need for an Islamic leadership system.

Following this, Syed Ahmad Shaheed was elected as the first Ameer (leader). A well-structured system was established, including the collection of Zakat, distribution of charity, and appointment of officials for religious and judicial affairs. This organized structure reduced internal conflicts and ensured unity. However, after Syed Ahmad Shaheed’s martyrdom in the Battle of Balakot (1831), Wilayat Ali Sadiqpuri (Bihari) was elected as the next Ameer, followed by Inayat Ali Sadiqpuri. This leadership structure continued for a long time.

=== 1857 Rebellion ===
During the 1857 War of Independence, Muslims actively fought against the British. In response, Islamic scholars and community leaders selected Imdadullah Muhajir Makki as their leader. Although the war was fought fiercely, Muslims faced defeat, leading to the dissolution of the Mughal Empire and the suspension of Islamic governance and judiciary. This created widespread unrest among Muslims, and later, Mahmud Hasan Deobandi emerged as a key leader. Many scholars pledged allegiance to his cause, and he launched the Silk Letter Movement (Tehreek-e-Reshmi Rumal) to mobilize resistance. However, the movement was eventually exposed, and in 1917, Mahmud Hasan Deobandi was imprisoned in Malta.

=== Abul Mahasin Muhammad Sajjad’s Initiative ===
Seeing the lack of unity among Islamic scholars, Abul Mahasin Muhammad Sajjad took the initiative to establish the Anjuman Ulama-e-Bihar, which later played a crucial role in the formation of Jamiat Ulama-e-Hind. His efforts also contributed to the establishment of the Khilafat Committee, and ultimately, led to the formation of Imarat-e-Shariah Bihar, Odisha, and Jharkhand.

=== The Proposal for All India Imarat-e-Shariah ===
In 1920, during the second annual session of Jamiat Ulama-e-Hind in Delhi, Abul Mahasin Muhammad Sajjad proposed the establishment of All India Imarat-e-Shariah, a nationwide Islamic governance system. The idea received strong support from Mahmud Hasan Deobandi, but due to his illness and other factors, the plan was postponed, and an Ameer-ul-Hind could not be elected.

=== Provincial Imarat-e-Shariah ===
At a Jamiat Ulama-e-Hind conference in 1921, Abul Kalam Azad presided over discussions regarding Imarat-e-Shariah-e-Hind. However, no final decision was made at that time. In a subsequent meeting, scholars including Hakim Ajmal Khan and Zahoor Ahmad (Secretary of All India Muslim League) discussed the issue further, leading to the drafting of an Imarat proposal.

During the Ajmer session of Jamiat Ulama-e-Hind, it was concluded that the establishment of a nationwide Imarat was not feasible at the time due to logistical challenges. Instead, it was resolved that provincial Imarat bodies should be established, and directives were issued to form them as soon as possible.

=== Formation of Imarat-e-Shariah Bihar and Orissa ===
In June 1921, after consultations with prominent scholars and community leaders, a meeting was held at Pathar Ki Masjid, Patna, presided over by Abul Kalam Azad. The gathering of approximately 500 scholars and community representatives officially established Imarat-e-Shariah Bihar and Orissa (now Imarat-e-Shariah Bihar, Odisha, and Jharkhand) on 26 June 1921 (19 Shawwal 1339 AH).

=== Establishment of the Office ===
On 9th Dhul-Qa'dah 1339 AH (Islamic calendar), the office of Imarat-e-Shariah was established at Khanqah Mujibiya in Phulwari Sharif. Usman Ghani contributed to the formation of the organizational structure of the Imarat and played a role in organizing its administrative and religious activities.

=== Separation and integration of Imarat-e-Shariah Odisha ===
Initially, Imarat-e-Shariah Bihar and Orissa functioned as a unified body after its establishment in 1921. However, following the administrative separation of Orissa (now Odisha) from Bihar in 1936, the demand for a distinct religious and judicial institution in Odisha gradually emerged. In 1964, Imarat-e-Shariah Odisha was formally established as an independent entity, with Muhammad Ismail Katki appointed as its first Ameer-e-Shariat.

Later, it became affiliated with All India Imarat-e-Shariah (Imarat-e-Sharia Hind) under Jamiat Ulama-e-Hind to coordinate religious and judicial activities on a national level.

Although Imarat-e-Shariah Odisha was established in 1964, Imarat-e-Shariah Bihar, Odisha, and Jharkhand, based in Phulwari Sharif, Patna, remains active there, overseeing religious, judicial, and educational affairs. Its scholars and representatives frequently visit Odisha for administrative and religious work.

=== Challenges from the Establishment of Imarat-e-Shariah Hind (1986) ===
In 1986, Jamiat Ulama-e-Hind (JUH), under the leadership of Asad Madani, announced the formation of Imarat-e-Shariah Hind in New Delhi, appointing Habibur Rahman Azami as Ameer-ul-Hind and Madani as Naib Ameer. This move was seen as a direct challenge to Imarat-e-Shariah Bihar, Odisha, and Jharkhand, which had functioned as a key Islamic judicial and religious institution for over five decades.

The creation of a national Imarat raised concerns among Muslim scholars and leaders. Critics, including Syed Shahabuddin, accused Madani of political opportunism, while Minnatullah Rahmani, the long-serving Ameer-e-Shariat, strongly opposed the move. Observers viewed this as an attempt to undermine regional Imarats and possibly weaken the All India Muslim Personal Law Board (AIMPLB), which was actively resisting the proposed Uniform Civil Code.

=== Legal status and informal jurisdiction ===
Although institutions like Imarat-e-Shariah lack formal judicial authority under the Indian Constitution, they operate as voluntary arbitration forums under the Muslim Personal Law framework. These institutions offer dispute resolution in matters such as marriage, divorce, inheritance, and waqf, provided that all parties consent to the arbitration process. Legal scholars describe such bodies as "non-state legal forums" that coexist with the state’s judicial system, particularly serving communities that prefer Shariah-based adjudication in personal matters.

== Leadership ==
The leadership of Imarat Shariah is held by the Ameer-e-Shariat, who is elected by an assembly of Islamic scholars, community leaders, and members. The Ameer-e-Shariat is responsible for overseeing religious, judicial, and social affairs according to Islamic principles. Since its establishment in 1921, eight individuals have held this position, each playing a crucial role in the development of Islamic jurisprudence, education, and community welfare.

=== Historical development of leadership ===
The first Ameer-e-Shariat, Shah Badruddin Qadri, was elected in 1921 and served until 1924, succeeded by Shah Mohiuddin Qadri, who held the position from 1924 to 1947. After him, Shah Qamaruddin Qadri served from 1947 to 1957, followed by Minnatullah Rahmani, who was elected as the fourth Ameer-e-Shariat in 1957 and remained in office until 1991.

Following his passing, Abdur Rahman Darbhangvi became the fifth Ameer-e-Shariat from 1991 to 1998, after which Syed Nizamuddin Qasmi Gayawi took over and served from 1998 to 2015. In 2015, Wali Rahmani was elected as the seventh Ameer-e-Shariat and remained in office until 2021.

After his demise, Ahmad Wali Faisal Rahmani was elected as the eighth Ameer-e-Shariat in 2021.

List of Emirs of Shariah
Name	Tenure
Shah Badruddin Qadri (1851–1924)	1921–1924
Shah Mohiuddin Qadri (1889–1947)	1924–1947
Shah Qamaruddin Qadri (1895–1957)	1947–1957
Minnatullah Rahmani (1913–1991)	1957–1991
Abdur Rahman Darbhangvi (1903–1998)	1991–1998
Syed Nizamuddin Qasmi Gayawi (1927–2015)	1998–2015
Wali Rahmani (1943–2021)	2015–2021
Ahmad Wali Faisal Rahmani	2021–present

=== Deputy Ameer-e-Shariat ===
The position of Deputy Ameer-e-Shariat (Naib Ameer-e-Shariat) has played an important role in assisting the Ameer-e-Shariat in administrative and religious affairs. After Abul Mahasin Muhammad Sajjad, who was the first to hold this position, Abdus Samad Rahmani was appointed as Deputy Ameer-e-Shariat. He was succeeded by Abdur Rahman Darbhangvi, who later became the Ameer-e-Shariat. Following him, Syed Nizamuddin Qasmi Gayawi held the position before being elected as Ameer-e-Shariat. Subsequently, the role was held by prominent Islamic scholar Qazi Mujahidul Islam Qasmi, followed by Muhammad Wali Rahmani.

As of 2021, Shamshad Rahmani was appointed as the Deputy Ameer-e-Shariat.

== Activities and educational initiatives ==
In addition to its religious and arbitration services, Imarat-e-Shariah has expanded its focus to modern education. In a 2015 executive council meeting chaired by Wali Rahmani, it was decided to establish secondary and higher secondary schools following the CBSE curriculum, vocational institutions, and a medical college across Bihar, Odisha, and Jharkhand. The first phase included a residential CBSE school in Ranchi, ITI education in Ranchi, and vocational training courses in Giridih.

Further expansions were planned in Samastipur (Chhoti Biryarpur), Jehanabad, and Dhanbad, with a three-member committee appointed to oversee feasibility assessments. Additionally, a medical college was proposed in Araria, contingent upon land availability.

In 2017, Imarat Shariah announced the establishment of CBSE-affiliated schools in Bihar and Jharkhand to provide quality education tailored to contemporary employment needs. The first phase included schools in Ranchi, Giridih, and Purnia, with plans to open more institutions in the coming years.

Alongside madrasa education, Imarat Shariah also operates polytechnics, paramedical institutes, and computer training centers to equip students with technical and vocational skills. These initiatives aim to enhance educational opportunities and provide career-oriented learning beyond traditional religious education.

== Religious arbitration and family law services ==
The Imarat-e-Shariah operates Darul Qazas (Islamic courts) that provide arbitration services for personal and family disputes, including marriage, divorce, inheritance, and waqf matters. One significant area of its work is resolving divorce cases, particularly khula, which allows a woman to seek divorce by surrendering her mahr (the agreed-upon marital gift). According to data from Imarat-e-Shariah, most divorce cases are now filed through khula, surpassing those initiated by husbands such as talaq-e-hasan. In the Islamic year 2021–22, the Darul Qaza in Patna handled 572 khula cases, reflecting a nationwide trend observed in other major cities and regions as well. The process is often quick and efficient, with many cases concluded within hours or days, and about 70% settled within two months. This provides Muslim women an accessible and timely means to end unhappy marriages while safeguarding their rights under Islamic law.

Moreover, following the Supreme Court’s 2017 verdict banning triple talaq and the 2019 legislation criminalising it, a new trend has emerged wherein some Muslim men abandon their wives instead of pursuing a formal divorce, possibly to avoid legal consequences or maintenance obligations. As a result, many women remain in limbo—neither formally divorced nor practically married. This has contributed to a noticeable rise in khula applications across India. Rights activists argue that while legal reform has raised awareness and reduced triple talaq incidents, it has also led to unintended consequences for Muslim women seeking clarity and justice in marital relationships.

== 2025 political activism and leadership dispute ==
In 2025, Imarat-e-Shariah was active in political and legal opposition to the Waqf (Amendment) Act, 2025, passed by the NDA-led central government in India. The organisation criticised the Act as undermining religious autonomy and threatening waqf properties, with legal challenges pending in the Supreme Court at the time.

In March 2025, an internal dispute emerged within Imarat-e-Shariah over leadership. A faction of the Majlis-e-Arbab-e-Hall-o-Aqd announced the removal of Ameer-e-Shariat Ahmad Wali Faisal Rahmani, citing concerns related to nationality, scholarly qualifications, and organisational matters. This faction subsequently declared Anisur Rahman Qasmi as the new Ameer-e-Shariat. However, Rahmani and his supporters rejected this decision and maintain that he remains the legitimate Ameer-e-Shariat. As of mid-2025, the leadership dispute remains unresolved, with significant sections of the community and the existing administrative structure continuing to recognise Rahmani’s leadership, while the opposing faction upholds Qasmi’s claim.

Despite these internal tensions, Imarat-e-Shariah joined other Muslim organisations in March 2025—including the All India Muslim Personal Law Board, Jamiat Ulema-e-Hind, Jamaat-e-Islami Hind, Jamiat Ahle Hadith (India), and the Khanqahs of Mujeebia and Rahmani—in boycotting the Bihar state government's official Iftar hosted by Chief Minister Nitish Kumar. The groups accused Kumar of aligning with the BJP and supporting laws perceived as adverse to Muslim interests.

In June 2025, Imarat-e-Shariah organised a large rally at Gandhi Maidan in Patna under the banner “Waqf Bachao, Dastoor Bachao Conference,” led by Ahmad Wali Faisal Rahmani. He alleged that the new law could enable increased state intervention in religious endowments and heritage sites and claimed that some BJP Members of Parliament privately expressed support for this view. The rally received support from several political parties, including the Congress, RJD, AIMIM, and the Samajwadi Party. However, the All India Muslim Personal Law Board indicated that it preferred not to turn the waqf issue into an electoral subject.

== See also ==
- Abul Mahasin Muhammad Sajjad
- Abul Kalam Azad
- Minnatullah Rahmani
- Wali Rahmani
- Jamiat Ulama-e-Hind
- Islam in India
