= Bihar Province =

Province of British India (1936–1947)

Coordinates: 25.6°N 85.1°E

Bihar Province Bīhār Sūbā
- Province of British Raj and Republic of India
- 1936–1947
- Flag Coat of arms

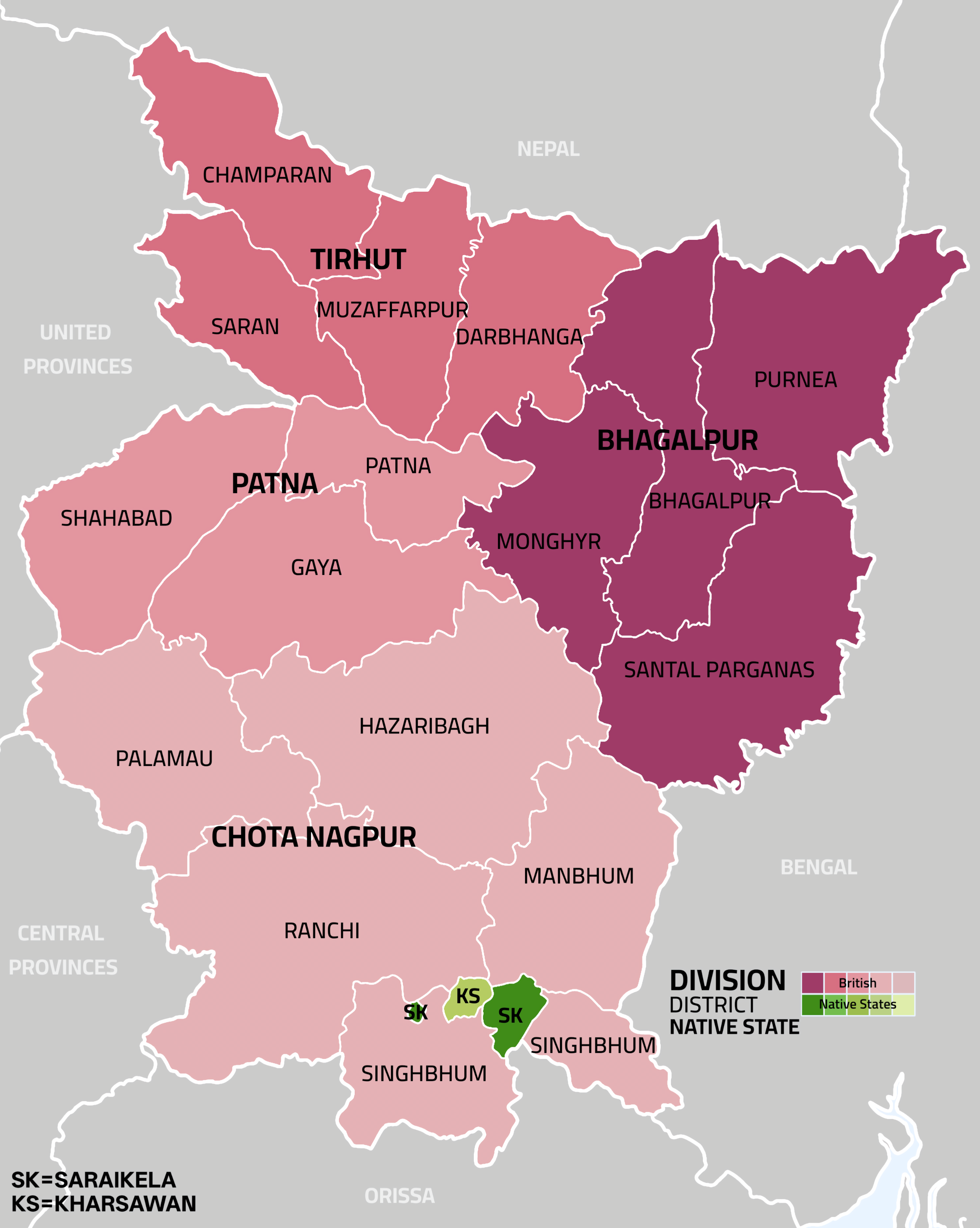
- Bihar Province 1937 map
- Capital: Patna
- History
  - Bifurcation of Bihar and Orissa Province: 1936
  - Independence of India: 1947
  - Bifurcation of Bihar state: 2000
Preceded by	Succeeded by
Bihar and Orissa Province	Bihar; Jharkhand
- Today part of: Bihar; Jharkhand

Bihar Province was a province of British Raj and later Republic of India, created in 1936 by the partition of the Bihar and Orissa Province. It consisted the modern Indian states of Bihar and Jharkhand.

== History ==
In 1756, Bihar was part of Mughal Bengal Subah. After the victories of the East India Company at the Battle of Plassey (1757) and the Battle of Buxar (1764), Bengal fell into British influence and was administered as the Bengal Presidency. Orissa was annexed into the Bengal Presidency in 1803, after the third Second Anglo-Maratha War.

On 22 March 1912, both Bihar and Orissa were separated from the Bengal Presidency and administered as the Bihar and Orissa Province. On 1 April 1936, Bihar and Orissa became separate provinces.

The Government of India Act 1935 provided for the election of a provincial legislative assembly and a responsible government. The Indian National Congress won a majority of seats in the 1937 Indian provincial elections but declined to form the government in Bihar. A minority government was formed under Muhammad Yunus of the Muslim Independent Party. After the fall of the Yunus government in July 1937, Governor Maurice Garnier Hallett invited Shri Krishna Sinha of the Congress to form the government.

Minister	Portfolio
Muhammad Yunus	Home and Education
Ajit Prasad Singh Deo	Local Self-Government (including Medical and Excise)
Abdul Wahab Khan	Finance and Irrigation
Gur Sahay Lal	Revenue and Development

Minister	Portfolio
Shri Krishna Sinha	Premier
Anugrah Narayan Sinha	Deputy Premier, Finance and Local Self Government
Syed Mahmud	Education
Jaglal Choudhary	Public Health and Excise

In 1939, along with Congress ministries in other provinces, Sinha resigned in protest of the Governor-General Linlithgow's declaration of war on Germany without consulting with Indian leaders and Bihar came under Governor's Rule. The Indian National Congress won 1946 Indian provincial elections in Bihar and Sri Krishna Sinha was invited by Governor Thomas George Rutherford to form the first cabinet of Bihar. It consisted of the Chief Minister. Upon India's independence on 15 August 1947, Bihar Province became a part of independent India.

== Administrative Divisions ==
=== Bhagalpur Division ===
- Bhagalpur district
- Munger district
- Purnia district
- Santhal Pargana district

=== Chota Nagpur division (Ranchi) ===
- Hazaribagh district
- Manbhum district
- Palamau district
- Ranchi district
- Singhbhum district

=== Patna division ===
- Gaya district
- Patna district
- Shahabad district

=== Tirhut division (Muzaffarpur) ===
- Champaran district
- Darbhanga district
- Muzaffarpur district
- Saran district

== Governors ==
- 1 Apr 1936 – 11 Mar 1937 Sir James David Sifton (s.a.)
- 11 Mar 1937 – 5 Aug 1939 Sir Maurice Garnier Hallett (b. 1883 – d. 1969)
- 5 Aug 1939 – 9 Jan 1943 Sir Thomas Alexander Stewart (b. 1888 – d. 1964) (acting to Sep 1939)
- 9 Jan 1943 – 6 Sep 1943 Sir Thomas George Rutherford (b. 1886 – d. 1957) (1st time)
- 6 Sep 1943 – 23 Apr 1944 Sir Robert Francis Mudie (acting) (b. 1890 – d. 1976)
- 23 Apr 1944 – 13 May 1946 Sir Thomas George Rutherford (s.a.) (2nd time)
- 13 May 1946 – 15 Aug 1947 Sir Hugh Dow (b. 1886 – d. 1978)

== Premiers ==
- 1 Apr 1937 – 19 Jul 1937 Mohammad Yunus (b. 1884 – d. 1952) MIP
- 20 Jul 1937 – 31 Oct 1939 Shri Krishna Sinha (1st time) (b. 1888 – d. 1961) INC
- 31 Oct 1939 – 23 Mar 1946 Governor's Rule
- 23 Mar 1946 – 15 Aug 1947 Shri Krishna Sinha (2nd time) (s.a.) INC

== See also ==
- List of governors of Bihar
