= Wali Rahmani =

Indian academic (1943–2021)

Sayyid Wali Rahmani

Sajjada Nashin of Khanqah-e-Rahmani Munger
- In office 1991 – 3 April 2021
- Preceded by: Sayyid Minatullah Rahmani

7th Ameer-e-Shariat of Imarat-e-Shariah, Bihar Odisha and Jharkhand
- In office 2015–2021
- Preceded by: Sayyid Nizamuddin Qasmi Gayawi
- Succeeded by: Ahmad Wali Faisal Rahmani

General Secretary of All India Muslim Personal Law Board
- In office 2010 – 3 April 2021

Member of the Bihar Legislative Council
- In office 1974–1996

Personal details
- Born: 5 June 1943 (age 83) Munger
- Died: 3 April 2021 Patna
- Parent: Minnatullah Rahmani (father)

Personal life
- Born: 5 June 1943 Munger, Bihar, India
- Died: 3 April 2021 (aged 77) Patna, Bihar, India

Religious life
- Religion: Islam
- Denomination: Sunni
- Founder of: Rahmani30
- Jurisprudence: Hanafi
- Movement: Deobandi

Muslim leader
- Disciples: Umrain Mahfooz Rahmani

Wali Rahmani (5 June 1943 – 3 April 2021) was an Indian Sunni Islamic scholar and academic who founded Rahmani30. He was a member of the Bihar Legislative Council from 1974 to 1996. He served as the general secretary of the All India Muslim Personal Law Board and Sajjada Nashin of the Khanqah Rahmani in Munger.

== Biography ==
Wali Rahmani was born to Minatullah Rahmani, an Islamic scholar who helped found the All India Muslim Personal Law Board. His grandfather Muhammad Ali Mungeri was one of the co-founders of Nadwatul Ulama.

Rahmani was appointed the Sajjada Nashin of Khanqah Rahmani, in Munger, in 1991 after the death of his father.

Shah Imran Hasan has written Rahmani's biography entitled Hayat-e-Wali.

Rahmani's spiritual chain goes back to Fazle Rahman Ganj Muradabadi.

Rahmāni died on 3 April 2021 from COVID-19. His funeral prayer was led by Umrain Mahfooz Rahmani, Secretary of the All India Muslim Personal Law Board.

== Views ==
In June 2015, Rahmani stated, "Surya Namaskar (a yoga posture) should not be mandatory in government schools, as Islam permits prostration only to Allah."
