= Thomas Alexander Stewart =

Sir Thomas Alexander Stewart

Governor of Bihar
- In office 6 August 1939 – 2 February 1943
- Preceded by: Maurice Garnier Hallett
- Succeeded by: Thomas George Rutherford
- In office 15 May 1938 – 16 September 1938
- Preceded by: Maurice Garnier Hallett
- Succeeded by: Maurice Garnier Hallett

Sir Thomas Alexander Stewart, KCSI, KCIE (26 February 1888 – 11 May 1964) was a British administrator in India who served as Governor of Bihar.

Educated at George Heriot's School, Edinburgh and the University of Edinburgh, Stewart entered the Indian Civil Service by examination in 1911. He successively served in the United Provinces, Burma, Madras, Bombay, and with the Government of India in Delhi.

Steward was appointed CSI in 1935, knighted KCIE in 1937, and made a KCSI in 1939.
