= Citizenship (Amendment) Act, 2003 =

Law regarding citizenship rights for migrants to India

Parliament of India
- Long title: A bill further to amend the Citizenship Act, 1955
- Citation: Act No. 6 of 2004
- Passed by: Rajya Sabha
- Passed: 18 December 2003
- Passed by: Lok Sabha
- Passed: 22 December 2003
- Assented to: 7 January 2004
- Signed by: President of India
- Effective: 3 December 2004

Legislative history

Initiating chamber: Rajya Sabha
- Bill title: Citizenship (Amendment) Bill, 2003
- Bill citation: Bill No. 39 of 2003
- Introduced by: L. K. Advani; Minister of Home Affairs
- Introduced: 7 May 2003

Amends
- Citizenship Act, 1955
- Status: In force

The Citizenship (Amendment) Act, 2003 was passed by the Parliament of India in December 2003 by Atal Bihari Bajpayee's government and received presidential assent in January 2004. It is labelled "Act 6 of 2004".

The Act amended The Citizenship Act, 1955 by:

- introducing and defining a notion of "illegal migrant", who could be jailed or deported.
- making illegal immigrants ineligible for citizenship by registration or by naturalisation,
- disallowing citizenship by birth for children born in India if either parent is an illegal immigrant, and
- introducing a notion of Overseas Citizen of India (OCI) for citizens of other countries who are of Indian origin.

The Act also mandated the Government of India to construct and maintain a National Register of Citizens.

Scholar Anupama Roy described this amendment as a "hinge point" from which emerged the two contradictory tendencies represented by the Citizenship Amendment Bill 2016 (eventually to be an Act in 2019) and the National Register of Citizens. These two developments gave rise to large-scale protests all over India in December 2019.

== Background ==
The Indian Constitution was implemented in 1950 guaranteed citizenship to all of the country's residents at the commencement of the constitution, and made no distinction on the basis of religion. The Indian government passed the Citizenship Act in 1955. The Act provided two means for foreigners to acquire Indian citizenship. People from "undivided India" (Note: The Act defines "undivided India" as "India as defined in the Government of India Act, 1935, as originally enacted". It included, in addition to India, the present day Pakistan and Bangladesh.) were given a means of registration after five years of residency in India. Those from other countries were given a means of naturalisation after ten years of residency in India. (Note: In the original 1955 Act, the residency requirement for registration was six months. That for naturalisation was five years.)

A very large number of illegal immigrants, the largest numbers of whom are from Bangladesh, live in India. The Task Force on Border Management quoted the figure of 15 million illegal migrants in 2001. The majority of them live in the states of Assam and West Bengal, but many attempt to find work in big cities like Delhi. The reasons for the scale of migration include a porous border, historical migration patterns, economic reasons, and cultural and linguistic ties.

On August 15, 1985, after six years of violent protests against migrants and refugees in the northeastern states of India, the Assam Accord was signed between the Indian government and the leaders of the Assam movement in the presence of Rajiv Gandhi. This accord, amongst other things, promised that the Indian government will deport all illegal aliens who had arrived after March 1971. A 1986 amendment to the Citizenship Act of 1955 was proposed and passed by a Congress-led government. This amendment restricted the Indian citizenship to those born in India prior to 1987 to either a mother or a father who was an Indian citizen. The Citizenship (Amendment) Act of 1986 effectively blocked jus soli citizenship to the children of couples who were both illegal aliens and to second-generation refugees from citizenship rights in India.

In addition, in 1983, the Congress government passed the Illegal Migrants (Determination by Tribunals) Act, thereby establishing a system to detect and expel foreigners through tribunal proceedings.

The "detection, deletion and deportation" of illegal migrants has been on the agenda of the Hindu nationalist Bharatiya Janata Party (BJP) since 1996. After coming to power in 1998, the government drafted an amendment to the Foreigners Act, 1946 proposing jail sentences and fines for illegal immigrants as well as for those abetting illegal immigration. After receiving a review report from the Law Commission, the amendment bill was passed by Rajya Sabha in May 2003 and by Lok Sabha in January 2004.

== Legislative history ==
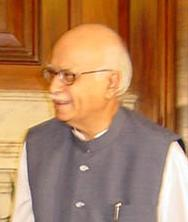
L. K. Advani, Home minister and Deputy Prime Minister

The bill to amend the Citizenship Act was introduced in the Parliament by L. K. Advani, the Home Minister, on 7 May 2003 during its Budget session. It was sent to the parliamentary standing committee on home affairs, and came back to both the houses of the Parliament by December 2003. It was passed unanimously by Rajya Sabha on 18 December and passed "without any acrimony" in the Lok Sabha on 22 December. The Congress, AIADMK, Rashtriya Janata Dal and some other opposition parties supported the bill.

The bill was branded as a "dual citizenship bill", a reference to the provision for Overseas Citizen of India. All the other changes to the citizenship law, some of the most radical ones since 1955, were passed without any comment. More than a decade later, in 2019, a comment made by Manmohan Singh, the leader of opposition in the Rajya Sabha, got circulated. Singh said, in connection with the legislation of "illegal immigrants", that the minorities of Bangladesh who had faced persecution in the country had to be treated more liberally:

After the partition of our country, the minorities in countries like Bangladesh have faced persecution, and it is our moral obligation that if circumstances force people, these unfortunate people, to seek refuge in our country, our approach to granting citizenship to these unfortunate persons should be more liberal.

The deputy chairman of the Rajya Sabha, Najma Heptullah added that minorities in Pakistan also faced persecution. The Home minister L. K. Advani endorsed the view and made a distinction between an "illegal immigrant" and a "bona fide refugee":

We always say that a person who has to flee because of religious persecution is a refugee, bona fide refugee, and he cannot be regarded on par with the illegal immigrant who may have come for any reason, even for economic reasons. If he is an illegal immigrant, he is an illegal immigrant. So, I take note of what has been said and endorse it.

But no changes in the bill are visible to address these concerns.

== The Amendments ==
=== Illegal migrants ===
Illegal migrants: The first significant change introduced by the 2003 Amendment is the introduction of the term "illegal migrant" to the Citizenship Act:

In section 2 of the Citizenship Act, 1955 (57 of 1955) (hereinafter referred to as the principal Act), in sub-section (1), for clauses (b) and (c) and the proviso to clause (c), the following clause shall be substituted, namely:

(b) "illegal migrant" means a foreigner who has entered into India

(i) without a valid passport or other travel documents and such other document or authority as may be prescribed by or under any law in that behalf; or
(ii) with a valid passport or other travel documents and such other document or authority as may be prescribed by or under any law in that behalf but remains therein beyond the permitted period of time;

The concept of "illegal migrants" was used for amending all the sections of citizenship acquisition (by birth, by descent, by registration and by naturalisation).

Citizenship by birth: The section 3 of the principal Act (citizenship by birth) was replaced wholesale:

For section 3 of the principal Act, the following section shall be substituted, namely:

(l) Except as provided in sub-section (2), every person born in India,

(a) on or after the 26th day of January, 1950, but before the 1st day of July,1987;
(b) on or after the 1st day of July, 1987, but before the commencement of the Citizenship (Amendment) Act, 2003 and either of whose parents is a citizen of India at the time of his birth;
(c) on or after the commencement of the Citizenship (Amendment) Act, 2003, where-

(i) both of his parents are citizens of India; or
(ii) one of whose parents is a citizen of India and the other is not an illegal migrant at the time of his birth, shall be a citizen of India by birth.

(2) [...]

The newly added clause (c) declares that, after 2003, if either parent of a child born in India is an illegal migrant, the child is not qualified to be a citizen. For children born between 1987–2003, it was adequate for one parent to be an Indian citizen. Prior to 1987, there were no restrictions.

Citizenship by descent: The section 4 of the principal Act (citizenship by descent) had its subsection (1) replaced wholesale:

(1) In section 4 of the principal Act, for sub-section (1), the following sub-sections shall be substituted, namely:

(1) A person born outside India shall be a citizen of India by descent,

(a) on or after the 26th day of January, 1950, but before the 10th day of December, 1992, if his father is a citizen of India at the time of his birth; or
(b) on or after the 10th day of December, 1992, if either of his parents is a citizen of India at the time of his birth:

Provided that [...]

The amended section liberalised descent via father to descent via either parent.

Citizenship by registration: The section of the principal Act (citizenship by registration, meant for "persons of Indian origin", i.e., migrants from "undivided India") had its subsection (1) replaced wholesale:

In section 5 of the principal Act,

(a) for sub-section (1), the following shall be substituted, namely:

"(1) Subject to the provisions of this section and such other conditions and restrictions as may be prescribed, the Central Government may, on an application made in this behalf, register as a citizen of India any person not being an illegal migrant who is not already such citizen by virtue of the Constitution or of any other provision of this Act if he belongs to any of the following categories, namely:

(a) a person of Indian origin who are ordinarily resident in India for seven years before making an application for registration;
(b–e) [...]
(f) a person of full age and capacity who, or either of his parents, was earlier citizen of independent India, and has been residing in India for one year immediately before making an application for registration;
(g) a person of full age and capacity who has been registered as an overseas citizen of India for five years, and who has been residing in India for two years before making an application for registration.

Explalation 1 [...]
Explanation 2 [...]

By the main amendment to section 5, illegal migrants cannot acquire citizenship by registration. The residence requirement for citizenship by registration was also increased to seven years from five years. The clauses (f) and (g) added new provisions.

Citizenship by naturalisation: Section 6 (citizenship by naturalisation) was amended prohibiting illegal migrants from getting naturalised:

In section 6 of the principal Act, in sub-section (1), for the words "who is not a citizen of a country specified in the First Schedule", the words "not being an illegal migrant" shall be substituted.

The Third Schedule, which lists the requirements for naturalisation, was amended by increasing the residency requirement to 12 years from the earlier 10 years.

=== National register of citizens ===
The 2003 Amendment mandated the Central Government to create and maintain a National Register of Citizens and to issue national identity cards to all the registered citizens.

After section 14 of the principal Act, the following section shall be inserted, namely:

"14A. Issue of national identity cards.-

(l) The Central Government may compulsorily register every citizen of India and issue national identity card to him.
(2) The Central Government may maintain a National Register of Indian Citizens and for that purpose establish a National Registration Authority.
(3) On and from the date of commencement of the Citizenship (Amendment) Act, 2003, the Registrar General, India, appointed under subsection (1) of section 3 of the Registration of Births and Deaths Act, 1969 (18 of 1969) shall act as the National Registration Authority and he shall function as the Registrar General of Citizen Registration.
(4) The Central Government may appoint such other officers and staff as may be required to assist the Registrar General of Citizen Registration in discharging his functions and responsibilities.
(5) The procedure to be followed in compulsory registration of the citizens of India shall be such as may be prescribed."

== Aftermath ==
In January 2005, it was reported that the Odisha government headed by Naveen Patnaik targeted 1,551 people in the Mahakalpada block for deportation, calling them illegal Bangladeshis. All of them were Hindus, and included women and children. Even though it was known that the majority of illegal immigrants in the area were Muslims, it was said that the Biju Janata Dal government was reluctant to target them. The targeted persons, belonging to the Namasudra Matua community, protested these actions over the next 15 years, including hunger strikes in Delhi and Kolkata, and filing a Supreme Court petition demanding unconditional citizenship.

The Estimates Committee of the Indian Parliament estimated 5.2 million refugees from the present day Bangladesh in 1989, 70 percent of whom belonged to agricultural communities and were mostly from scheduled castes. This population is likely to have grown to 13 million by 2019. Scholar Himadri Chatterjee states:

"The amendment of 2003 was, therefore, made with full knowledge as to who it would primarily and adversely affect."

In 2012, the CPI(M) leader Prakash Karat wrote Manmohan Singh, then prime minister, reminding him of his 2003 statement and urging him to bring an amendment to address the minority community refugees. The chief minister of Assam Tarun Gogoi also submitted a memorandum to the prime minister pleading that "Indian citizens" who had to flee religious persecution due to partition should not be treated as foreigners.

In September 2015, the Narendra Modi government made a decision to exempt the minority refugees of Bangladesh and Pakistan who entered India before December 2014 from the category of "illegal immigrants" and made them eligible for long-term visas. The Foreigners (Amendment) Order, 2015 was issued under the Foreigners Act, 1946 for this purpose.

In 2016, the Home minister Rajnath Singh brought a bill to the Parliament seeking exemption for persons belonging "minority communities, that is, Hindus, Jains, Sikhs, Buddhists, Parsis, and Christians" fleeing Afghanistan, Pakistan and Bangladesh due to religious persecuting from being treated as "illegal immigrants". After considerable debate, a revised version of the bill was passed as the Citizenship (Amendment) Act, 2019 and led to large-scale protests across India in 2019.

== See also ==
- Citizenship (Amendment) Act, 2019
- National Register of Citizens
- Illegal immigration to India
- Refugees in India

== Bibliography ==
- Universal's The Citizenship Act, 1955 (PDF), Universal Law Publishing Co., 2004 – via UNHCR
- Jayal, Niraja Gopal (2013), Citizenship and its Discontents: An Indian History, Harvard University Press, ISBN 978-0-674-06758-5
- Gupta, Kanchan (2019), Beyond the poll rhetoric of BJP's contentious Citizenship Amendment Bill, Observer Research Foundation
- Naujoks, Daniel (2014), "The securitization of dual citizenship. National security concerns and the making of the Overseas Citizenship of India", Diaspora Studies, 8 (1): 18–36, doi:10.1080/09739572.2014.957975, ISSN 0973-9572, S2CID 145738350
- Poddar, Mihika (2018), "The Citizenship (Amendment) Bill, 2016: international law on religion-based discrimination and naturalisation law", Indian Law Review, 2 (1): 108–118, doi:10.1080/24730580.2018.1512290, S2CID 158325181
- Ranjan, Amit (2019), "National Register of Citizen Update: History and its impact", Asian Ethnicity, 22 (3): 1–17, doi:10.1080/14631369.2019.1629274, S2CID 198727392
- Roy, Anupama (2010), Mapping Citizenship in India, OUP India, ISBN 978-0-19-908820-1
- Roy, Anupama (14 December 2019), "The Citizenship (Amendment) Bill, 2016 and the Aporia of Citizenship", Economic and Political Weekly, 54 (49): 28–34
- Roy, Haimanti (2013), Partitioned Lives: Migrants, Refugees, Citizens in India and Pakistan, 1947-65, OUP India, ISBN 978-0-19-808177-7
- Sarker, Shuvro Prosun (2017), Refugee Law in India: The Road from Ambiguity to Protection, Springer, ISBN 978-981-10-4807-4
- Sinharay, Praskanva (2019), "To Be a Hindu Citizen: Politics of Dalit Migrants in Contemporary West Bengal", South Asia: Journal of South Asian Studies, 42 (2): 359–374, doi:10.1080/00856401.2019.1581696, S2CID 150566285
