= Indian nationality law =

History and regulations of Indian citizenship

The Citizenship Act, 1955

Parliament of India
- Long title: An Act to provide for acquisition and determination of Indian citizenship.
- Citation: Act No 57 of 1955
- Territorial extent: India
- Enacted by: Parliament of India
- Enacted: 30 December 1955
- Commenced: 30 December 1955

Related legislation
- The Foreigners Act, 1946; Citizenship (Amendment) Act, 2003; Citizenship (Amendment) Act, 2019
- Status: Amended

Indian nationality law details the conditions by which a person holds Indian nationality. The two primary pieces of legislation governing these requirements are the Constitution of the Republic of India and the Citizenship Act, 1955.

All people born in India between 26 January 1950 and 1 July 1987 automatically received citizenship by birth regardless of the nationalities of their parents. Between 1 July 1987 and 3 December 2004, citizenship by birth was granted if at least one parent was a citizen. Individuals born in the country since then receive Indian citizenship at birth only if both parents are Indian citizens, or if one parent is a citizen and the other is not considered an illegal migrant.

Foreigners may become Indian citizens by naturalisation after residing in the country for at least 12 years and renouncing any previous nationalities. Members of certain religious minority communities from neighbouring countries qualify for a reduced residence requirement of six years. Indian citizens who permanently settle in Pakistan or Bangladesh, or voluntarily acquire foreign citizenship automatically lose Indian citizenship. Dual citizenship is allowed in certain cases of minor children.

India was previously ruled by the British Empire and local residents were British subjects and British protected persons. Although India gained independence in 1947 and Indians no longer hold British nationality, they continue to have favoured status when residing in the United Kingdom; as Commonwealth citizens, Indians are eligible to vote in UK elections and serve in public office there. Indian citizens also enjoy free movement rights in Nepal through bilateral agreement.

== Terminology ==
The distinction between the meaning of the terms citizenship and nationality is not always clear in the English language and differs by country. Generally, nationality refers a person's legal belonging to a nation state and is the common term used in international treaties when referring to members of a state; citizenship refers to the set of rights and duties a person has in that nation.

In general discourse within the Indian context, the two terms are used interchangeably. However, the Supreme Court provides a more precise definition applicable in Indian law; citizenship is a legal status that can only be held by natural persons and determines the civil and political rights a person may exercise, while nationality is a status that can apply to both natural and juridical persons that determines the rights that entity has in the context of international law.

== Colonial-era history ==
=== Company administration ===
The East India Company was founded by royal charter in 1600 and granted a monopoly on all English trade with Asia. The vast financial resources of the firm and its superior military enabled it to defeat rival European trade companies and become the dominant power in India. The company itself ruled as the direct governing body from 1757 to 1858, though sovereignty was often shared with the Crown. Although legislation was enacted referencing British subjects in India, no comprehensive nationality statute existed to define which persons were subjects, leaving the status of native Indians ambiguous throughout this period.

Legislation passed in 1852 allowed foreigners residing in territory governed by the East India Company to naturalise as British subjects by application to the government. There was no minimum residence requirement and candidates simply needed approval from a relevant official. The oath of allegiance administered to successful applicants required them to swear loyal service to the company, as well as allegiance to the British monarch.

=== Direct imperial rule ===
India was brought under direct rule of the British Empire in 1858. Territories were broadly divided between two political groupings: the provinces of British India, which were administered by the British government, and the princely states, which were areas ruled by local monarchs given limited autonomy in exchange for accepting British suzerainty. Provincial residents were British subjects, while subjects of princely state rulers were considered British protected persons instead.

Although Britain held comprehensive jurisdiction in both types of holdings, domestic law treated the princely states as foreign territory. British protected persons were treated as aliens in the United Kingdom, but both Indian British subjects and protected persons could be issued British Indian passports. Protected persons could not travel to the UK without first requesting permission, but were afforded the same consular protection as British subjects when travelling outside of the Empire. A person with connections to both directly governed portions of British India and one of the princely states could be a British subject and British protected person simultaneously.

British nationality law during this time was uncodified and did not have a standard set of regulations, relying instead on past precedent and common law. In 1847, the Imperial Parliament formalised a clear distinction between subjects who were naturalised in the UK and those who did so in other territories. Those naturalised in colonies were said to have gone through local naturalisation and were given subject status valid only within the relevant territory. For example, a subject locally naturalised in Bengal was a British subject there, but not in England nor New South Wales. Like protected persons, locally naturalised British subjects were still entitled to imperial protection when travelling outside of the Empire.

The Imperial Parliament brought regulations for British subject status into codified law with the British Nationality and Status of Aliens Act 1914 (4 & 5 Geo. 5. c. 17). British subject status was standardised as a common nationality across the Empire. This act allowed Dominions and British India to grant subject status to aliens by imperial naturalisation, but did not prevent further grants of local naturalisation under local legislation.

==== Unequal status ====
Following the Indian Rebellion of 1857, Queen Victoria issued a royal proclamation to the "Princes, Chiefs and People of India" in 1858, declaring the Crown to be "bound to the natives of our Indian territories by the same obligations of duty which bind us to all our other subjects". Official rhetoric emphasised British subject status as a platform of equity, illustrating an imperial philosophy that all subjects of the Crown were equal before the law, regardless of race or background.

This ideal was directly contradicted by a series of immigration restrictions in other colonies and Dominions that were created to exclude non-white migrants, including Indian British subjects, from entering their borders. Australia, Canada, New Zealand, and South Africa all enacted legislation severely restricting Indian immigration in some form by the early 20th century. Indians had greater success exercising their British subject rights in Britain itself, exemplified by the election of two Indian candidates to the House of Commons, Dadabhai Naoroji and Mancherjee Bhownaggree.

Demands for an equal imperial citizenship with the same status and rights as European British subjects were a primary motivator for Indian civil rights movements throughout the Empire in the late 19th and early 20th centuries. While the imperial government had recognised these claims as legitimate prior to the First World War, it decided to suppress local unrest rather than politically address Indian concerns. As it became apparent that equality within the British Empire would not be possible, the focus of post-war Indian political movements turned towards independence.

== Post-independence policies ==
=== Partition and transition ===
British India was partitioned into two independent Dominions on 15 August 1947, the Union of India and Federation of Pakistan. India transitionally retained the British sovereign as its head of state until its continued membership in the Commonwealth of Nations as a republic was agreed upon at the 1949 Commonwealth Prime Ministers' Conference. Indians continued to be British subjects. Subjects of the princely states, who were previously considered British protected persons, became British subjects of India when their states acceded to India.

British subject status was reformed under the British Nationality Act 1948. The Act abandoned the common nationality used across the Empire and redefined British subject to mean any citizen of a Commonwealth country. A Commonwealth citizen was defined in this Act to have the same meaning. British subject/Commonwealth citizen status co-existed with the citizenship of each Commonwealth country. Because India had not enacted citizenship regulations by the time the 1948 Act took effect on 1 January 1949, Indians (and citizens of all other Dominions without citizenship laws) were provisionally classed as "British subjects without citizenship".

=== Republic and a national citizenship ===
The citizenship provisions of the Constitution of India came into force on 26 November 1949, in advance of the document's full effective date and the country's conversion into a republic on 26 January 1950. The partition resulted in large-scale population movements across the new borders separating India and Pakistan. In this context, the Constituent Assembly limited the scope of the Constitution's citizenship provisions for the immediate purpose of determining citizenship of these migrants. The Citizenship Act later enacted by Parliament in 1955 provides a full framework detailing citizenship requirements after that point.

Any individual domiciled in India automatically became an Indian citizen in 1949. In addition any one born in India, born to at least one parent who themself was born in India, or living in India for at least five years prior to the Constitution's commencement, also became Indian citizens. Individuals of Indian descent living outside of the country could register for citizenship, but a person who had voluntarily acquired citizenship of a foreign state was barred from Indian citizenship. In this context, the definition of "foreign state" does not include Commonwealth member states.

Persons who migrated from the area that became part of Pakistan would be deemed to be Indian citizens if they (or a parent or grandparent) were born in any part of pre-partition India as defined by the Government of India Act 1935 and had either become domiciled in Indian territory before 19 July 1948, or had been registered as a citizen of India by Dominion officials after that date, but before commencement of the Constitution. Migrants from Pakistan were required to have been domiciled in India for at least six months prior to applying for registration. Conversely, persons who migrated from India to Pakistan and settled there at any time are not considered Indian citizens.

Migration between Nepal and India has been unrestricted since before a clear boundary existed between the two countries. While the British Indian government had encouraged Nepalese to settle in northeastern India to facilitate the growth of tea plantations in that area, high levels of migration between the two countries continued to occur due to cultural and religious similarities. Following Indian independence, the government negotiated a free movement agreement with Nepal that resulted in the 1950 Indo-Nepal Treaty of Peace and Friendship; all Indian and Nepalese citizens have since had the officially sanctioned ability to live and work in either country.

==== Commonwealth citizenship ====
Commonwealth citizens initially continued to hold an automatic right to settle in the United Kingdom and Ireland after 1949. Non-white immigration into the UK was systemically discouraged, but strong economic conditions in Britain following the Second World War attracted an unprecedented wave of colonial migration. In response, the British Parliament imposed immigration controls on any Commonwealth citizens originating from outside the British Islands with the Commonwealth Immigrants Act 1962. Ireland had continued to allow all British subjects free movement despite independence in 1922 as part of the Common Travel Area arrangement, but moved to mirror Britain's restriction in 1962 by limiting this ability only to people born on the islands of Great Britain or Ireland. Britain somewhat relaxed these measures in 1971 for patrials, subjects whose parents or grandparents were born in the United Kingdom, which gave effective preferential treatment to white Commonwealth citizens.

Under the 1955 Citizenship Act, Commonwealth citizens were eligible to obtain Indian citizenship by registration in lieu of naturalisation, though there were no specific advantages to this method of acquisition. This pathway was available until Commonwealth citizen status was removed from Indian law in 2003. The UK itself updated its nationality law to reflect the more modest boundaries of its remaining territory and overseas possessions with the British Nationality Act 1981, which redefined the term "British subject" to no longer also include Commonwealth citizens. Indian citizens remain Commonwealth citizens in British law and are still eligible to vote and stand for public office in the UK.

==== Integration of remaining colonies ====
Remaining European colonial possessions in India were reintegrated by 1961. French-administered Chandernagore held a referendum in 1949 resulting in the city's merger with West Bengal, while the rest of French India was relinquished by 1954. Portuguese India was taken by force with two military offensives in 1954 and 1961. Although most residents of these territories were given a choice between acquiring Indian citizenship and retaining their previous nationalities, those from Dadra and Nagar Haveli were not. In Goa, Daman and Diu, residents automatically became Indian citizens on 20 December 1961 unless they had made a written declaration before this date stating their intention to retain their existing nationality. Portugal did not recognise the annexation of its former Indian territories; persons born in applicable areas before 3 June 1975 were recognized as Portuguese citizens.

==== Accession of Sikkim ====
The Kingdom of Sikkim was an autonomous monarchy in northeastern India from the 17th century to 1975. Although Britain (and later India) had control over its foreign affairs, Sikkim was never considered a princely state and always held full autonomy over domestic matters. Sikkim lacked codified nationality legislation until 1961, when the Sikkim Subject Regulation came into force. This legislation initially defined Sikkim subjects as anyone of native ancestry with their permanent home in the country, or a person permanently settled in Sikkim who had cut all ties with their previous country or had acquired real estate in Sikkim. Subject status was further restricted by a requirement to have held property rights in Sikkim before 1937, effectively barring a large number of Nepali residents from obtaining a permanent status in the country. Dual citizenship was prohibited and women automatically lost their rights as subjects on their marriage to non-Sikkimese men.

The ethnic qualification to subject status was particularly unpopular, leading to a revolt and the repeal of the regulation in the following year. However, the 1962 amendment also created a facilitated naturalisation pathway for non-subjects of native ancestry; any person descended from a person domiciled in Sikkim before 1850 could apply for subject status even if they did not live in the country.

After the dissolution of Sikkim's monarchy and its accession to India in 1975, any person registered as a Sikkimese subject before 26 April 1975 became an Indian citizen. This process of acquisition left certain groups of people living in Sikkim stateless including long-term residents without property, Sikkimese women who married non-Sikkimese, and individuals who had otherwise qualified for subject status but failed to complete registration before 1975.

=== Legislative responses to migration ===
Indian nationality regulations were broadly permissive when they were first created at the time of the republic's founding. Successive governments since the 1980s have gradually increased the difficulty of acquiring Indian citizenship in response to changing patterns of immigration from neighbouring countries.

Large-scale migration into Assam from Bengal began during colonial rule. British authorities encouraged workers from outside the region to resettle there to provide a continual source of labour for railway construction, agricultural development, and resource mining. The National Register of Citizens for Assam was created in 1951 to maintain a central ledger of all citizens in the state as a result of local discontent towards the influx of migrants.

Assam's population growth rate was substantially higher than the rest of India for the entire period between 1901 and 1981. The highest levels of migration occurred in the decade following the 1971 Bangladesh Liberation War; an estimated 1.8 million people settled in the state in the 1970s, compared to 221,000 in the 1950s and 424,000 in the 1960s. During a local election in 1979, a substantial portion of the enrolled electorate was discovered to be non-citizens. The ensuing backlash triggered the multi-year Assam Movement, which demanded the expulsion of foreigners in the state. Protest organisers and government officials ultimately agreed on the Assam Accord in 1985, which resulted in the addition of Section 6A to the Citizenship Act that same year. Under this change, any person who had been living in Assam prior to 1966 was an Indian citizen; those who settled there between 1966 and 1971 were removed from electoral rolls and subject to a 10-year waiting period before becoming eligible to register for citizenship. Migrants arriving after 1971 were all considered to have illegally immigrated.

Ethnic conflict in neighbouring Sri Lanka led to civil war in 1983. Following the start of hostilities, about 100,000 people sought refuge in India. This event, combined with sustained unrest in Assam, led to another amendment to the Citizenship Act in 1986 that limited citizenship by birth to children born to at least one Indian parent. A further amendment in 2003 restricted that entitlement only to children with two Indian parents, or those with one parent who is a citizen and if the other is not considered an illegal migrant. Mandatory registration in the National Register of Citizens for the entire country (contrasted with the register specific to Assam) was introduced in that year, as well as overseas citizenship for the Indian diaspora living abroad.

Restrictions were selectively relaxed in 2019 for migrants from neighbouring countries belonging to certain religious groups who illegally entered India before 2015; persons from Afghanistan, Bangladesh, and Pakistan who are Hindus, Sikhs, Buddhists, Jains, Parsis, or Christians are not counted as illegal migrants for nationality purposes and are eligible for a reduced six-year residence requirement for naturalisation. The enactment of these changes sparked widespread protests for countering the secular nature of earlier citizenship law.

The National Register of Citizens for Assam was comprehensively updated in 2019, with every citizen in the state required to show proof of their citizenship and pre-1971 settlement. 1.9 million people failed to provide sufficient documentation and were not listed on the register, leaving them stateless and subject to deportation.

== Acquisition and loss of citizenship ==
=== Entitlement by birth or descent ===
All persons born in India between 26 January 1950 and 1 July 1987 automatically received citizenship by birth regardless of the nationalities of their parents. From 1 July 1987 until 3 December 2004, children born in the country received Indian citizenship by birth if at least one parent was a citizen. Since then, citizenship by birth is granted only if both parents are Indian citizens, or if one parent is a citizen and the other is not considered an illegal migrant.

Children born overseas are eligible to become Indian citizens by descent if at least one parent is a citizen. The birth of eligible persons must be registered at an Indian diplomatic mission within a certain time frame for citizenship to be granted. Individuals born before 3 September 2004 were not required to have had their birth registered and received citizenship by descent automatically, unless either parent was an Indian citizen by descent, in which case registration of their birth was mandatory. Prior to 10 December 1992, only children of Indian fathers (not mothers) were eligible for citizenship by descent. Indian citizens by descent who hold another nationality automatically cease to be Indian citizens six months after reaching the age of 18, unless they renounce their foreign nationality.

=== Voluntary acquisition ===
Certain non-citizens qualify for citizenship by registration if they are married to an Indian citizen, are minor children of Indian citizens, or are of Indian origin and living either in the country or outside the area of pre-partition India. Persons whose parents are Indian citizens, who themselves or their parents had previously held Indian citizenship, or have held overseas citizenship for at least five years are also eligible to acquire citizenship by registration. Eligible individuals must be resident in the country for at least 12 months prior to an application for registration, and are subject to additional residence requirements depending on the criterion they qualified under.

All other foreigners may become Indian citizens by naturalisation after residing in the country for at least 11 of the previous 14 years, with an additional 12 months of residence immediately preceding an application, a total of 12 years. Anyone acquiring Indian citizenship through either naturalisation or registration must renounce their previous nationalities. Between 2010 and 2019, about 21,000 people naturalised as Indian citizens.

Any person deemed to be an illegal migrant is typically barred from obtaining citizenship through both naturalisation and registration. However, migrants from Afghanistan, Bangladesh, or Pakistan who belong to selected religious communities (Hindus, Sikhs, Buddhists, Jains, Parsis, or Christians) and arrived in India prior to 2015 are not considered illegal migrants. They are eligible for naturalisation with a reduced residence requirement; at least five years of residence during the previous 14-year period, along with the additional 12 months of residence immediately preceding an application.

=== Relinquishment and deprivation ===
Indian citizenship can be voluntarily relinquished by any person over the age of 18. Minor children of a person who gave up citizenship also cease to be citizens. On reaching adult age, these children have the option of resuming Indian citizenship within one year. Before 2003, relinquishment required holding nationality of another country, and all married women were considered to be of full age for the purposes of giving up citizenship regardless of their actual age. Minor children lost citizenship only if their fathers (not mothers) relinquished that status until 1992. Any Indian citizen who permanently settles in Pakistan or Bangladesh, or who voluntarily acquires citizenship of another country at any time automatically loses Indian citizenship. Between 2015 and 2019, about 670,000 people lost their Indian citizenship either through renunciation or automatic loss after acquiring a foreign nationality.

== Dual citizenship ==
Indian citizens by descent can be dual citizens until 18 upon which they have to choose a citizenship. Dual citizenship was allowed with specific countries till 2005. Citizenship amendment bill of 2003 allowed citizens by descent to continue Indian citizenship after 18 if they registered as overseas citizens. Residents of Goa have claimed to have dual citizenship since there was no law terminating their previous citizenship.

== Overseas citizenship ==
Former Indian citizens and descendants of citizens have been eligible for overseas citizenship since its creation in 2003. This status gives its holders a lifelong entitlement to live and work in the country but they cannot vote in elections, stand for public office, and are subject to restrictions on entry into protected and restricted areas. Overseas citizenship is a status created specifically to work around the constitutional prohibition on holding multiple nationalities; it is not considered a full form of Indian citizenship. All persons who (or whose parents or grandparents) have ever been citizens of Pakistan or Bangladesh are permanently ineligible for overseas citizenship.

== See also ==
- Visa policy of India
- Visa requirements for Indian citizens
