= Rrahmani =

Rrahmani is an Albanian surname. Notable people include:

- Albert Rrahmani (born 2007), Kosovan-Danish footballer
- Albina Rrahmani (born 1989), Kosovan football player and manager
- Albion Rrahmani (born 2000), Kosovan footballer
- Amir Rrahmani (born 1994), Kosovan footballer

== See also ==
- Rahmani, Arabic surname
