= Ali Rahmani =

Iranian businessman

Ali Rahmani (علی رحمانی) was born in Kashmar (25 May 1967). He was the first managing director of Tehran Stock Exchange. He is professor of accounting at Alzahra University.
