= All India Muslim Personal Law Board =

Indian non-government legal organisation

- Abbreviation: AIMPLB
- Formation: 7 April 1972 (54 years ago)
- Founder: Muhammad Tayyib Qasmi; Minnatullah Rahmani
- Founded at: Hyderabad
- Type: NGO
- Headquarters: 76 A/1, Main Market, Okhla Village, Jamia Nagar
- Location: South Delhi, India - 110025
- Region served: Pan-India
- President: Khalid Saifullah Rahmani
- General secretary: Fazlur Rahim Mujaddidi
- Website: aimplb.org

All India Muslim Personal Law Board (AIMPLB) is a non-government organisation constituted in 1973 to adopt suitable strategies for the protection and continued applicability of in India, most importantly, the Muslim Personal Law (Shariat) Application Act of 1937, providing for the application of the Islamic Law Code of to Muslims in India in personal affairs. The Act applies to all matters of personal law except such successions. Even this section had the right under laws such as the Cutchi Memons Act, 1920 and the Mahomedan Inheritance Act (II of 1897) to opt for "Mahomedan Law". Faizur Rahman claims that a majority of Muslim followed Muslim law, not the Hindu civil code.

The Board presents itself as the leading body of Muslim opinion in India, a role for which it has been criticised as well as supported. All India Muslim Personal Law Board was set up during Prime Minister Indira Gandhi's time.

Most of the Muslim sects are represented on the board and its members include prominent Muslims from cross section of the Indian Muslim society such as religious leaders, scholars, lawyers, politicians and other professionals. One of its presidents, played crucial role in keeping Muslim scholars from diverse field at the platform of AIMPLB. However, Muslim scholar Tahir Mahmood, Kerala Governor Arif Mohammad Khan and retired Supreme Court judge Markandey Katju have advocated abolishing of All India Muslim Personal Law Board.

The All India Muslim Personal Law Board have refused to accept Ahmadiyya Muslims in India. Ahmadis were not allowed to sit on the All India Muslim Personal Law Board due to their deviation from the fundamental principles of Islam.

Maulana Kalbe Sadiq, senior vice president of AIMPLB is also the vice chairman of the All India Shia Personal Law Board.

custody of children, guardianship, maintenance. The AIMPLB has been involved in various significant cases and debates, including those related to the Muslim Women (Protection of Rights on Divorce) Act, the Shah Bano case, and the Triple Talaq issue. AIMPLB is a private body working to protect Muslim personal laws, liaise with and influence the Government of India and guide the general public about crucial issues. The board has a working committee of 51 ulama representing various schools of thought. In addition to this, it also has a general body of 201 persons of ulama as well as laymen, including about 25 women.

However, some of the Shia Muslims and Muslim feminists have formed their own separate boards, the All India Shia Personal Law Board and the All India Muslim Women's Personal Law Board, respectively but have failed to win any significant support from the Muslims or the government.

== Executive committee ==
Khalid Saifullah Rahmani was elected as the fifth President of the All India Muslim Personal Law Board (AIMPLB) during an executive meeting held on 3–4 June 2023 in Mhow, Indore. He succeeded Rabey Hasani Nadwi, who had held the position for 21 years until his demise in April 2023.

Following his election, Fazlur Rahim Mujaddidi was appointed as the new General Secretary of the Board, replacing Rahmani.

The current Vice Presidents of the Board include Syed Sadatullah Husaini, Arshad Madani, Obaidullah Khan Azmi, and Mohammed Ali Mohsin Taqvi.

Ahmad Wali Faisal Rahmani was appointed as one of the secretaries of the Board in June 2023, and he resigned from the position in November 2024.

Other secretaries of the Board include Umrain Mahfooz Rahmani, Bilal Abdul Hai Hasani Nadwi, and Yaseen Ali Usmani. Mohammad Riaz Umar serves as the treasurer of the Board.

Executive members of the Board include prominent figures such as K. Ali Kutty Musliyar, Muhammad Sufyan Qasmi, Rahmatullah Mir Qasmi, Syed Qasim Rasool Ilyas, Khalid Rashid Firangi Mahali, Asaduddin Owaisi, Syed Shah Mohammed Quadri, and Yusuf Hatim Muchhala. Female executive members include Moonesa Bushra Abdi, Atiya Siddiqua, A.S. Fathima Muzaffer, and Nighat Praveen Khan.

== Associated scholars ==
- Sayyid Minatullah Rahmani (co-founder, former General Secretary)
- Mujahidul Islam Qasmi (co-founder, former President)
- Wali Rahmani (former General Secretary)
- Jalaluddin Umri (former Vice President)
- Muhammad Salim Qasmi (former Vice President)
- Fazlur Rahim Mujaddidi (General Secretary)

== Criticism ==
The AIMPLB focuses primarily to defend the Sharia laws from any law or legislation that they consider infringes on it. In this role initially it has objected to any change in the Divorce Laws for Muslim women. In this regard it has even published a book – Nikah-O-Talaq (Marriage and Divorce). However, from time to time it has been hinted by the board that it might reconsider its position. It has also objected to gay rights and supports upholding the 1861 Indian law that bans sexual intercourse between persons of the same sex.

The Board has also objected to the Right of Children for Free and Compulsory Education Act, 2009 as they believe it will infringe on the Madrasa System of Education. It has also supported child marriage and opposes the Child Marriage Restraint Act. It supports marriage age as 15 but says we do not promote it but people should have choice. It has also objected to the Supreme Court of India Judgement on Babri Mosque. For this, it is also willing to threaten political action. The Board was in the headlines for its opposition to the live video conference of author Salman Rushdie to the Jaipur Literature Festival in January 2012. After government considered making yoga compulsory in schools They argued that "there is a serious threat to our religion. There is a sinister design to impose 'Brahmin dharma' through yoga, Surya Namaskara and Vedic culture. They all are against Islamic beliefs. We need to awaken our community for launching a protest on a large scale."

== Model Nikahnama ==
AIMPLB drafted a model 'nikahnama' in 2003 laying down specific guidelines and conditions on which a marriage can be annulled by both husband and wife in large sections of Sunni Muslims in Uttar Pradesh.

== See also ==
- All India Shia Personal Law Board
- All India Muslim Personal Law Board (Jadeed)
