= Muslim Independent Party (India) =

Former Indian political party

The Muslim Independent Party was a political party founded in India in 1935 by Abul Muhasin Muhammad Sajjad.

== History ==
The party was founded in 1935 by Abul Muhasin Muhammad Sajjad, the Amir of Imarat-e-Sharia, Bihar, to represent Muslims in Bihar who were disillusioned with Congress and the Muslim League. As Congress did not have a clear policy related to India's Muslim population and the Muslim League was advocating a separate nation, which was dividing the country, the Muslims of Bihar decided to establish their own Party.

Barrister Mohammad Yunus and Syed Abdul Aziz were two of the most influential Bihari Muslim leaders at the time. Yunus formed the Muslim Independent Party, stating their opposition to both Congress and the Muslim League by using the word "Independent", and Syed Abdul Aziz formed the Muslim United Party. In the 1937 election, the party emerged as the largest Muslim political party in Bihar and the second largest party in Bihar after Congress.

Out of 40 seats reserved for Muslims, the Muslim Independent Party won 20. Syed Abdul Aziz's Muslim United Party won seven of the seats, four Muslims were elected on the Congress ticket, and eight Independent Muslim candidates were also elected. Yunus won for the party in the rural Patna West seat, and Sayyid Minatullah Rahmani won in Bhagalpur/Munger. The Muslim Independent Party formed the government in Bihar in 1937. Yunus, the party president, became the chief minister of Bihar on 1 April 1937. The Muslim Independent Party wanted to form an coalition government with Congress to prove to the Muslim League that Hindu and Muslims, these two biggest religious groups, could exist with equal dignity and rights, but Congress rejected Yunus's proposal and attempted to form a government alone. Youth leader Jayaprakash Narayan, a staunch socialist, strongly criticised Yunus's acceptance of the governor's invitation to form a government. His Congress Socialist Party organised protests against the Muslim Independent Party government.

The party soon lost power, allowing Congress to form the government in the state.

== See also ==
- List of Deobandi organisations
