= Rahmani30 =

Educational programme in India

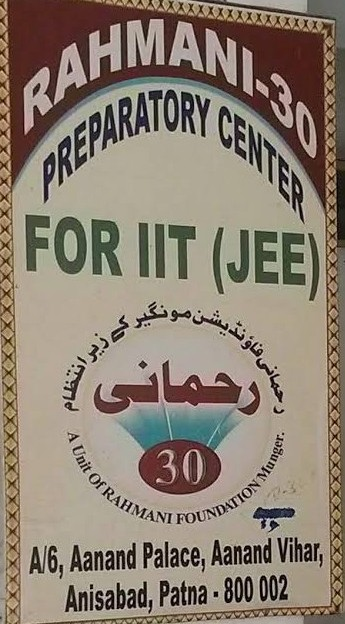
- Founder: Wali Rahmani

Rahmani30 is an Indian educational movement that was started in Patna, Bihar, India under the banner of 'Rahmani Program of Excellence', by Wali Rahmani with Abhayanand, former DGP Bihar as the academic head. It is modelled after the Super 30 format of educational organizations pioneered by Abhayanand and caters to Indian Muslim students.

Rahmani30 provides education and preparation for medical, IIT, CA, CS and LAW entrance education. Established in 2008, acceptance rate of Rahmani 30 is 0.1%, less than IITs. The program selects 30 meritorious and talented candidates each year from economically challenged sections of society only Muslims and trains them for the Joint Entrance Examination, the entrance examination for premium institutes like Indian Institute of Technology, International Institutes of Information Technology, National Institutes of Technology (India), Indian Institutes of Information Technology, trains for National Eligibility cum Entrance Test (Undergraduate), entrance examination for premium Medical institutes like All India Institutes of Medical Sciences, CA, CS and trains for LAW entrances for admission in the premium institutes like National Law Universities.

Over a hundred students who attended Rahmani30 are now studying in the Institutes of National Importance.
