= Maurice Garnier Hallett =

6th governor of United Provinces

Sir Maurice Garnier Hallett

Governor of United Provinces
- In office 7 December 1939 – 6 December 1945

Governor of Bihar Province
- In office 1937–1939

Home Secretary to the Government of British India
- In office 12 April 1933 – 1936
- Preceded by: Sir H. W. Emerson
- Succeeded by: Sir R. M. Maxwell

Chief Secretary to the Government of Bihar and Orissa Province
- In office 1930 – 11 April 1933

Secretary to the Government of Bihar and Orissa Province
- In office 1920–1924

Personal details
- Born: 28 October 1883 Priors Hardwick, Warwickshire, England
- Died: 30 May 1969 (aged 85)
- Spouse: Lady Gladys Veasey
- Children: Stephen Hallett (son)
- Parents: John Thomas Hallett (father); Caroline Maria (mother)

Sir Maurice Garnier Hallett, GCIE, KCSI (28 October 1883 – 30 May 1969) was a British administrator who served as governor of the United Provinces and of Bihar Province.

== Biography ==
He was born to John Thomas Hallett (1830–1915) and Caroline Maria (1841–1915) on 28 October 1883 at Priors Hardwick, Warwickshire. He had three siblings. His father was vicar of Priors Hardwick.

He received his education from the Winchester College and New College, Oxford. After completing his education, he joined the Indian Civil Service in 1907.

=== Career ===
He was first appointed Magistrate and Collector in 1916. From 1920 to 1924, he served as Secretary to the government of Bihar Province, and later he was appointed Officiating Commissioner in 1929. He also served as Chief Secretary to the government of Bihar and Orissa from 1930 to 11 April 1933, and Home Secretary to the government of British India from 12 April 1933 until he was later appointed governor of Bihar from 1936 to 1937. Later, he served as sixth governor of the United Provinces from 7 December 1939 to 6 December 1945. Prior to his last appointment, he served as governor of the United Provinces for a period of five months from 17 May 1938 to 16 September 1938.

He was among the other officials to formulate an action plan with Governor-General of India, Lord Linlithgow regarding the Khaksar movement and detention of Inayatullah Khan Mashriqi. He also illogically announced that Kumaoni soldiers to be thieves and dacoits at a lecture at Lansdown in Northern India in 1945, he was referring to the soldiers of Azad Hind Fauj of Netaji Subhas Bose.
