= Abul Mahasin Muhammad Sajjad =

Indian Islamic scholar (1880–1940)

Mawlānā Abul Mahasin Muhammad Sajjad

Mufakkir-e-Islām

2nd General Secretary of Jamiat Ulama-e-Hind
- In office 13 July 1940 – 23 November 1940
- Preceded by: Ahmad Saeed Dehlavi
- Succeeded by: Abdul Haleem Siddiqi

Personal life
- Born: 1880 Panhessa, Nalanda District now Bihar Province, Colonial India
- Died: 23 November 1940 (aged 59–60)
- Notable work: Fatwa Tark-e-Mawalat
- Education: Madrasa Subhāniya, Allahabad

Religious life
- Religion: Islam
- Denomination: Sunni Islam
- Founder of: Muslim Independent Party
- Jurisprudence: Hanafi

Abul Mahasin Muhammad Sajjad (1880 – 23 November 1940) was an Indian Islamic scholar who was one of the most influential ulemas of the 20th century. Sajjad was a founder of Anjuman-Ulama-i-Bihar, Jamiat Ulema-e-Hind, and Imarat-i-Sharia. A leader in the Indian independence movement, Abul Mahasin Muhammad Sajjad participated in the Non-cooperation Movement, Khilafat Movement, and Civil Disobedience Movement; he opposed the partition of India and championed the concept of composite nationalism. He also founded the Muslim Independent Party in 1935 to represent Muslims in Bihar who were disillusioned with Congress and the Muslim League. The Muslim Independent Party formed the government in Bihar in 1937. Yunus, the party president, became the chief minister of Bihar on 1 April 1937.

== Early life and education ==
Muhammad Sajjad was born in the Panhessa village in the Sheikhpura district of the Bihar Province in Colonial India. His father was Hussain Baksh who died when he was only 4 years old.

Sajjad's elder brother was the revered Sufi saint Sufi Ahmad Sajjad who lived until 1948. Sufi Ahmad Sajjad's Mazar is located near a mosque in the village where Urs of the great Sufi Saint is celebrated every year on the 27th day of Muharram. The shrine's current Sajjada Nashin (hereditary administrator) is the saint's grandson Pir Syed Shah Mohammad Ziauddin (born 1953).

Sajjad started studying at Madrasa Islamiya in Bihar, and then studied at Madrasa Subhaniya in Allahabad for about six years. His major teachers include Abdul Kāfi. He graduated in 1323 AH. Sajjad completed his studies in Bihar Sharif, Deoband, and Allahabad.

== Career ==
He later returned to Bihar Sharif and Allahabad, to teach theology, as well as at Gaya. In 1917, Sajjad founded the Anjuman-Ulama-i-Bihar and also became one of the founders of Jamiyat al-Ulama-i-Hind. He served as the secretary of Imarat-i-Sharia, which he helped found.

A leader in the Indian independence movement, Sajjad took part in the Non-cooperation movement, Khilafat Movement and Civil Disobedience Movement. He was a proponent of Hindu-Muslim unity and was a leader in the hartals that boycotted the Simon Commission. He along with Maghfoor Ahmad Ajazi, Shaukat Ali, Begum Md. Ali, Azad Subhani, Abdul Majid Daryabadi and others represented the Central Khilafat Committee at the All Parties Conferences and All Muslim Parties Conferences on Nehru Report. He opposed the partition of India and the separatist campaign of Muhammad Ali Jinnah. He established Anwarul Ulum Madrasa in Gaya.

Sajjad authored the Fatwa Tark-e-Mawalat, the religious edict on boycotting the British goods, on 8 September 1920. It was signed by 500 Muslim scholars and issued from the Jamiat Ulama-e-Hind. He was appointed the general secretary of Jamiat Ulama-e-Hind on 13 July 1940. He would earlier serve as the working general secretary in absence of Ahmad Saeed Dehlavi.

== Death ==
Sajjad died on 23 November 1940.

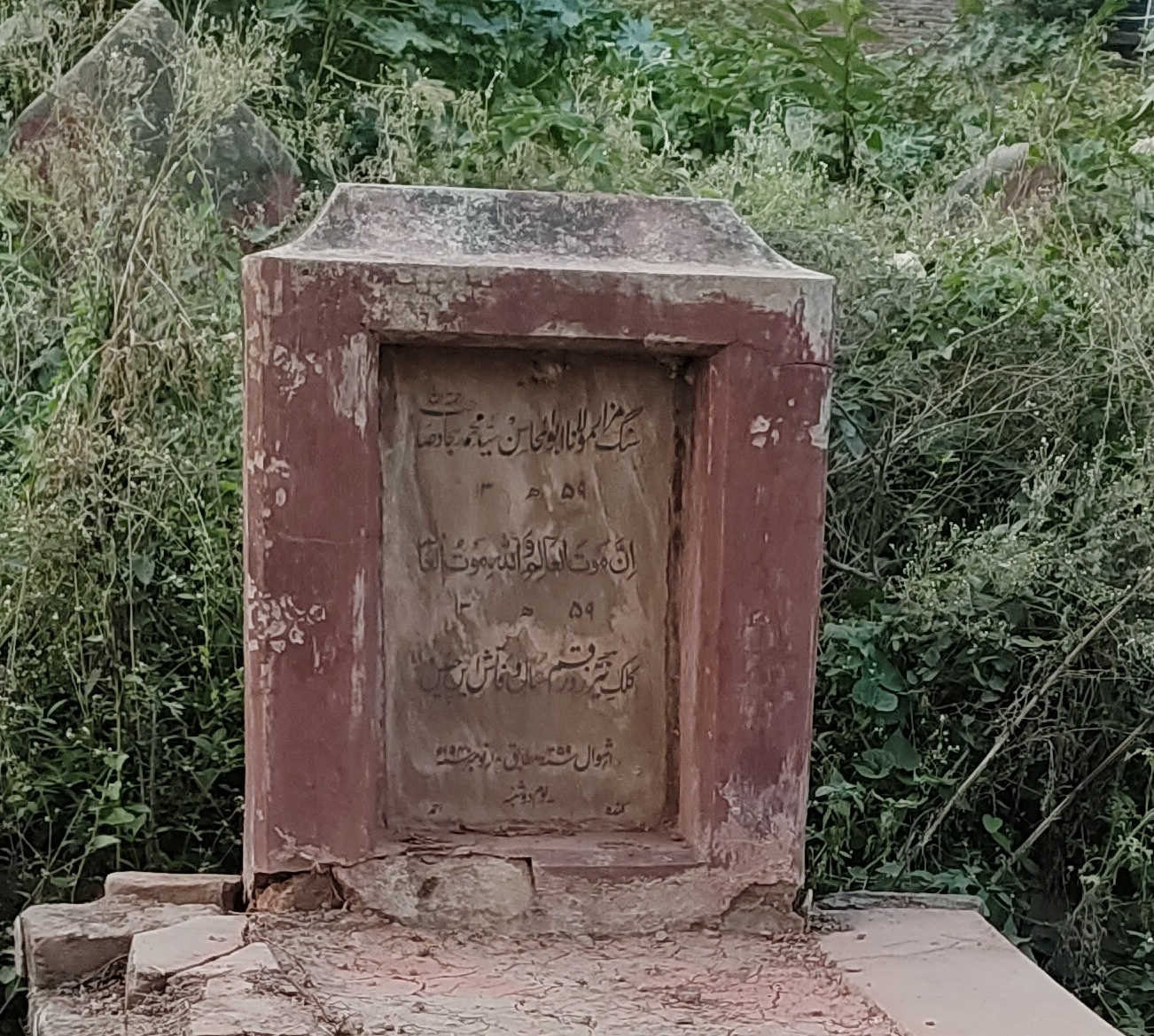
Inscription on the grave of Abul Mahasin Muhammad Sajjad

== See more ==
- List of Deobandis

== Bibliography ==
- Nadwi, Talha Nemat (2018). Hadhrat Mawlāna Abul Mahasin Muḥammad Sajjad (in Urdu) (2nd, 2019 ed.). New Delhi: Abjad Publishers.
- Akhtar Imām Aadil Qāsimi. Hayāt-e-Abul Mahāsin (in Urdu) (2019 ed.). Samastipur District, Bihar: Jāmia Rabbāni Manorwa Sharīf.
