= Thomas George Rutherford =

Governor of Bihar

Sir Thomas George Rutherford

Governor of Bihar
- In office 24 April 1944 – 12 May 1946
- Preceded by: Sir Francis Mudie
- Succeeded by: Thomas Alexander Stewart
- In office 3 February 1943 – 6 September 1943
- Preceded by: Nityanand Kanungo
- Succeeded by: Sir Francis Mudie

Sir Thomas George Rutherford, KCSI, CIE (25 September 1886 – 5 August 1957) was a British colonial administrator who served as the governor of Bihar from 1944 to 1946. Educated at George Watson's College, the University of Edinburgh, and University College, London, Rutherford entered the Indian Civil Service in 1910. He played a major role in the suppression of the Rampa Rebellion of 1922, which was led by Alluri Sitarama Raju.
