= National Register of Citizens =

Register of Indian citizens

The National Register of Citizens (NRC) is meant to be a register of all Indian citizens. The NRC creation was mandated by the 2003 amendment of the Citizenship Act, 1955.The purpose of the National Register of Citizens (NRC) is to maintain an official record of Indian citizens, verify their citizenship status and help identify illegal immigrants for appropriate legal action, including deportation where legally warranted.

It has been implemented for the state of Assam starting in 2013–2014. The Government of India announced plans to implement it for the rest of the country in 2021, but it has not yet been implemented.

In 2019, the Government passed Citizenship (Amendment) Act, 2019 (also referred to as "CAA 2019" or "CAA"), which promised an accelerated naturalisation process for immigrants of persecuted Hindu, Christian, Buddhist, Parsi, Sikh and Jain religious minority communities of Bangladesh, Pakistan and Afghanistan, which was widely seen as a way to exempt non-Muslims that might fail the criteria for inclusion in NRC. Nationwide protests objecting to the CAA and demanding that NRC not be implemented led to a pause in the government's plans.

During 2025–2026, the Election Commission of India ordered a Special Intensive Revision of electoral rolls, which incorporated some elements of citizenship testing, leading to allegations that it was an NRC exercise via a backdoor.

== Background ==
Assam, being a border state with unique problems of illegal immigration, had a register of citizens created for it in 1951 based on the 1951 census data. However, it was not maintained afterwards. The Illegal Migrants (Determination by Tribunal) Act, 1983 was then passed by the Parliament, creating a separate tribunal process for identifying illegal migrants in Assam. The Supreme Court of India struck it down as unconstitutional in 2005, after which the Government of India agreed to update the Assam NRC.

Following unsatisfactory progress on the process of updating the Assam NRC for over a decade, the Supreme Court started directing and monitoring the process in 2013. The final updated NRC for Assam, published on 31 August 2019, contained 31 million (3.1 crore) names out of its population of 33 million (3.3 crore), leaving out 1.9 million (19 lakh) applicants, rendering them potentially stateless. The ruling Bharatiya Janata Party (BJP), which has championed the NRC exercise, did not find the results meeting its expectations. It believes that several legitimate citizens were excluded while many illegal migrants were included.

The BJP has promised to implement the NRC for all of India in its election manifesto for the 2019 Indian general election. On 19 November 2019, Home minister Amit Shah declared in the Rajya Sabha of the Indian parliament that the NRC would be implemented throughout the country.

According to the Citizenship Rules, 2003, the central government can issue an order to prepare the National Population Register (NPR) and create the NRC based on the data gathered in it. The 2003 amendment further states that the local officials would then decide if the person's name will be added to the NRC or not, thereby deciding their citizenship status. No new rules or laws are needed to conduct this exercise in the whole of India.

== Legal and regulatory provisions ==
The Citizenship (Amendment) Act, 2003 (numbered "Act 6 of 2004") added the following clause to the Citizenship Act, 1955:

14A. Issue of national identity cards.

(l) The Central Government may compulsorily register every citizen of India and issue national identity card to him.
(2) The Central Government may maintain a National Register of Indian Citizens and for that purpose establish a National Registration Authority.
(3) On and from the date of commencement of the Citizenship (Amendment) Act, 2003, the Registrar General, India, appointed under subsection (1) of section 3 of the Registration of Births and Deaths Act, 1969 (18 of 1969) shall act as the National Registration Authority and he shall function as the Registrar General of Citizen Registration.
(4) The Central Government may appoint such other officers and staff as may be required to assist the Registrar General of Citizen Registration in discharging his functions and responsibilities.
(5) The procedure to be followed in compulsory registration of the citizens of India shall be such as may be prescribed.

The Citizenship (Registration of Citizens and Issue of National Identity Cards) Rules, 2003, formulated under the Act specify:

4. Preparation of the National Register of Indian Citizens.

(1) The Central Government shall, for the purpose of National Register of Indian Citizens, cause to carry throughout the country a house-to-house enumeration for collection of specified particulars relating to each family and individual, residing in a local area including the Citizenship status.
(2) The Registrar General of Citizen Registration shall notify the period and duration of the enumeration in the Official Gazette.
(3) For the purposes of preparation and inclusion in the Local Register of Indian Citizens, the particulars collected of every family and individual in the Population Register shall be verified and scrutinized by the Local Registrar, who may be assisted by one or more persons as specified by the Registrar General of Citizen Registration.
(4) During the verification process, particulars of such individuals, whose Citizenship is doubtful, shall be entered by the Local Registrar with appropriate remark in the Population Register for further enquiry and in case of doubtful Citizenship, the individual or the family shall be informed in a specified proforma immediately after the verification process is over.
(5) (a) Every person or family specified in sub-rule (4), shall be given an opportunity of being heard by the Sub-district or Taluk Registrar of Citizen Registration, before a final decision is taken to include or to exclude their particulars in the National Register of Indian Citizens.
(5) (b) The Sub-district or Taluk Registrar shall finalize his findings within a period of ninety days of the entry being made, or within such reasonable extended time for which he shall record the reasons in writing.
(6) ...

As explained by the Ministry of Home Affairs in December 2018, "The Citizenship Act of 1955 provides for compulsory registration of every citizen of India and issuance of National Identity Card to him. The Citizenship Rules of 2003, framed under the Citizenship Act of 1955, prescribe the manner of preparation of the National Register of Citizens. There is a special provision under the Rules to prepare the National Register of Citizens (NRC) in Assam which is application-based and distinct from the rest of India where the process is enumeration-based."

== Difference from National Population Register (NPR) ==
The National Population Register (NPR) is the register with detailed records of all the people and includes both the citizens and the non-citizens in any rural or urban area of India. In contrast, the National Register of Citizens (NRC) is the register of details about Indian citizens residing in India and outside India. NPR is not a citizenship enumeration drive, as it would record even a foreign national staying in a locality for more than six months. NPR is a population registrar and not a citizens' registrar like NRC.

Minister of State for Home Affairs, Kiren Rijiju, as a response in the Rajya Sabha, that was released on 26 November 2014 by the Ministry of Home Affairs, Government of India stated that "the NPR is the first step towards creation of National Register of Indian Citizens (NRIC) by verifying the citizenship status of every usual residents."

Residents of a locality living there for at least six months with plans to continue their residence for another six months or more are included into the list of NPR. It is prepared as per the provisions of the Citizenship Act, 1955, and the Citizenship (Registration of Citizens and Issue of National Identity Cards) Rules, 2003 (passed by the BJP led government under Vajpayee). The listing is done at the local (village/sub-town), sub-district, district, state and national level. Every "usual resident of India" is required to register in the NPR.

According to the Citizenship Rules, 2003, the centre can issue an order to prepare the NPR and create the NRC based on the data gathered in the NPR. As per the 2003 Citizenship rules, the local officials would then decide if the person's name will be added to the NRC or not, thereby deciding his citizenship status. No new rules or laws are needed to conduct this exercise in the whole of India.

On 18 June 2014, then Home Minister Rajnath Singh had given instructions "to take NPR project to its logical conclusion which is creation of National Register of Indian Citizens". Since 2014, the government has stated in the Parliament several times that the National Register of Indian Citizens (NRIC) or NRC is based on the data collected under the NPR, after the verification of the citizenship status of every individual.

In 2010, the NPR was created for the first time with the names of 119 crore residents of India. This data further was updated in 2015 by linking with biometric information from Aadhaar database. The NPR planned for 2020 will also include more details such as the place of birth of the parents, last place of residence and the serial number for official documents.

Critics believe the Indian government will use the list to mark people as doubtful citizens after which they would be asked to prove their citizenship.

== National Social Registry ==
The National Social Registry will either be a single, searchable Aadhaar-seeded database, or "a cluster of multiple databases" that use Aadhaar numbers to integrate religion, caste, income, property, education, Civil status, or marital status, employment, disability and family-tree data of each single citizen. it'll automatically update itself in real-time.

== Implementation ==
On 24 December 2019, the Central Cabinet approved ₹3,941 crore (US$420 million) for updating the NPR, marking one of the first steps in implementing the NRC. The NPR is scheduled to take place in April 2020 throughout India (except Assam).

Prime Minister Narendra Modi on 22 December 2019 stated that "there has been no discussion on NRC anywhere... we only had to implement it in Assam to follow Supreme Court directives." The CPI(M) leader Prakash Karat alleged it to be "disinformation" by the government. Karat clarified that the NPR was the first step of the NRC process.

On 31 July 2019, the Registrar General of Citizen Registration had issued the notification to prepare and update the NPR. The timeline for this was announced to be between 1 April 2020 and 30 September 2020. As per the NPR exercise, an enumeration will be carried out throughout the country (except Assam) by visiting every house for "collection of information relating to all persons who are usually residing within the jurisdiction of the Local Registrar". According to the procedure announced through the "Citizenship (Registration of Citizens and Issue of National Identity Cards) Rules 2003", the list of NPR will undergo due verification and it will form the basis of the local register of Indian citizens.

== Detention Centres ==
According to the Section 3(2)(c) of The Foreigners Act, 1946, the central government can deport people of foreign countries who are staying illegally in India.

In anticipation of the possible requirement to house a large number of illegal foreigners, who may be declared as such by the final NRC of India and the Foreigners' Tribunals, the government is in the process of building several detention camps throughout India. One of the first detention centres had come up in Assam during the tenure of the Congress government in 2008. In 2014, the centre had told all the states to set up at least one detention centre for illegal immigrants so as not to mix them up with jail inmates.

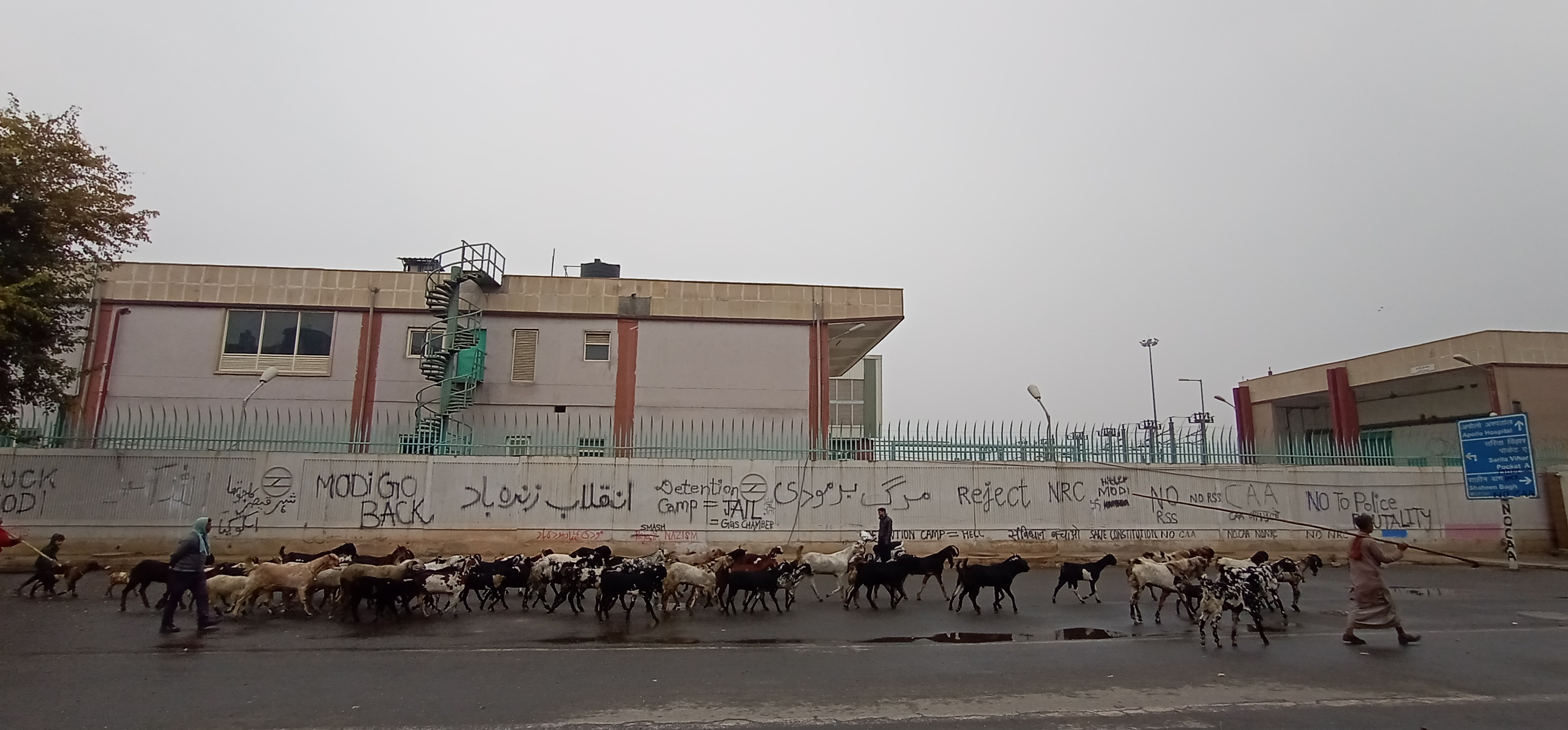
Slogans and graffiti protesting against CAA, NRC and detention camps in New Delhi on 8 January 2020. Visible are "Detention Camp = Jail = Gas Chamber", "Detention camp = Hell" and "Reject NRC" among others. Comparisons with Nazi Germany are visible.

In 2018, activists filed a petition in the Supreme Court of India and brought to its notice the condition of the families separated from each other and locked separately in the six existing detention centres of Assam. On 9 January 2019, the Central government released a '2019 Model Detention Manual', which stated that every city or district, having a major immigration check post, must have a detention centre. The guidelines suggest detention centres with 10 feet high boundary walls covered with barbed wires. It also clarified the difference between a prison and a detention centre.

- Delhi Detention Centre is spread over three locations in Delhi to hold foreigners waiting for deportation. One of the centres at Lampur is being operated under the Foreigners Regional Registration Office (FRRO). The Special Branch of Delhi Police supervises the ward holding the Pakistanis, while people of other nationalities are under the watch of the FRRO. FRRO and Delhi police both work under the Central Home Ministry.
- Goa Detention Centre at Mapusa was opened for foreigners in May 2019.
- Karnataka Detention Centre is under construction at Sondekoppa in Nelamangala, located 40 km from Bangalore. It is planned to be operational from 1 January 2020. The centre has 10-feet high walls, barbed wires with watchtowers in two corners of the compound.
- Maharashtra Detention Centre is being constructed at Nerul in Navi Mumbai, Maharashtra in a 1.2-hectare (3.0-acre) plot of land.
- Punjab Detention Centre is currently being built in Goindwal Sahib in Tarn Taran district and is planned for completion in May 2020. AS of 2019, the foreigners are kept in a separate enclosure at Central Jail in Amritsar.
- Rajasthan Detention Centre is located in the campus of the Central Jail in Alwar.

In December 2019, it was reported that the detention centres planned in West Bengal had been put on hold. Kerala resumed construction in 2021.

=== Assam Detention Centre ===
The first detention centre in Assam came up in 2008, when the Congress was in power in the state, under orders of the court. In 2011, the Congress government built three more camps in the region. The Government of the state of Assam is constructing ten more detention camps besides six already in place. The first such new exclusive detention camp is under construction in the district of Goalpara in lower Assam at the cost of around ₹46 crore (US$4.9 million) and a capacity to hold 3000 people. The detention center covers approximately 288,000 square feet (26,800 m^{2}) square feet (about the size of seven football grounds) and was planned to have fifteen storeys. It was planned to be ready by December 2019.

== CAA and NRC protests ==
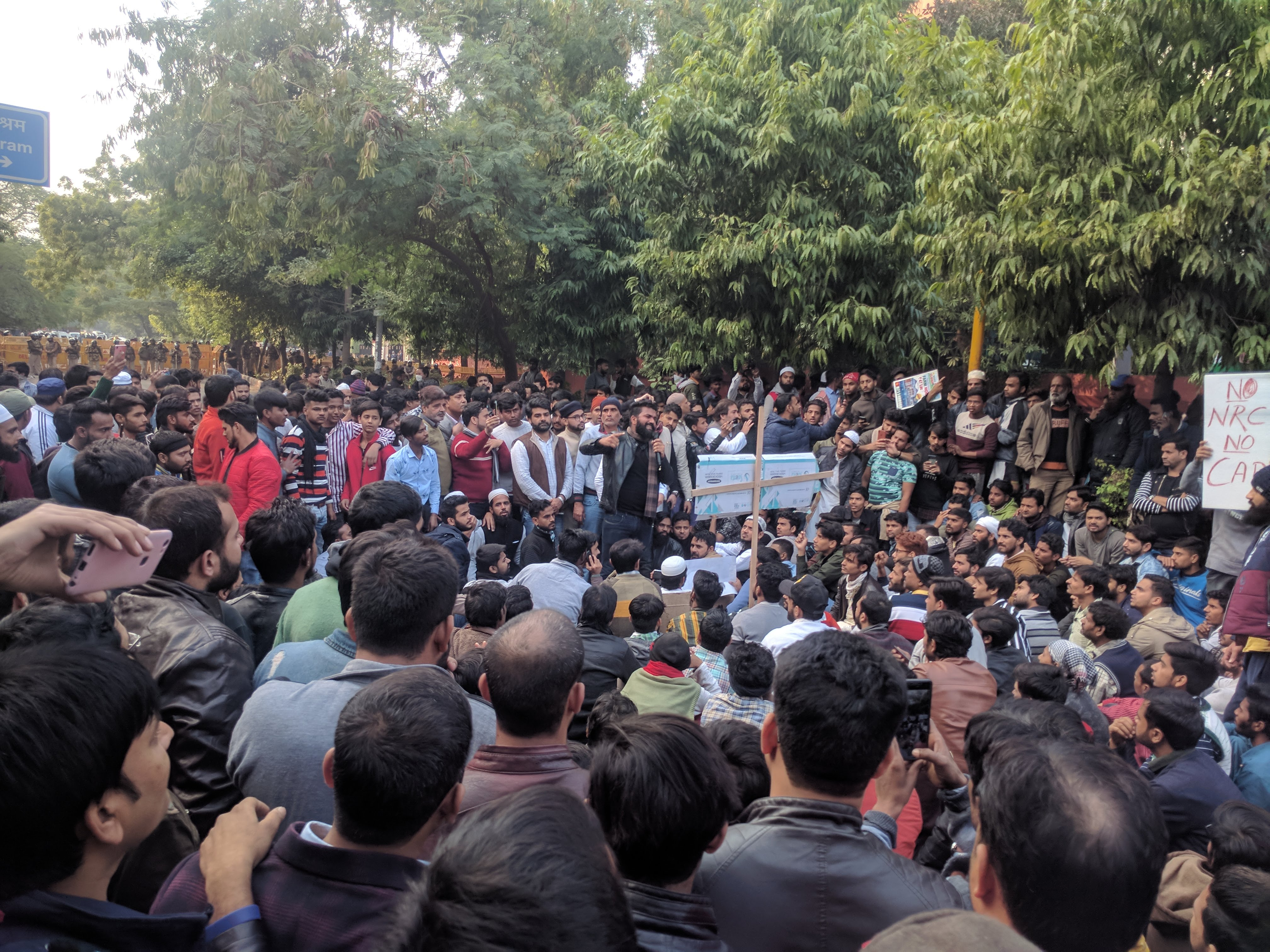
Protest against CAA and NRC

CAA and NRC protests are a series of protests in India against the Citizenship (Amendment) Act, which was enacted into law on 12 December 2019, and against the nationwide implementation of the NRC. Protesters in all regions are concerned that the upcoming compilation of the National Register of Citizens might be used to deprive Muslims of Indian citizenship.

Protests continued until at least 12 January 2020, with many of individuals carrying placards criticizing the act as well as the government.

== See also ==
- 2021 census of India
- Indian nationality law
- Demographics of India
- Illegal immigration to India
- Citizenship (Amendment) Act, 2003
- Citizenship (Amendment) Act, 2019
- Registrar General and Census Commissioner of India

== Bibliography ==
- Universal's The Citizenship Act, 1955 (PDF), Universal Law Publishing Co., 2004 – via UNHCR
- Gupta, Kanchan (2019), Beyond the poll rhetoric of BJP's contentious Citizenship Amendment Bill, Observer Research Foundation
- Kumar, Alok Prasanna (21 July 2018), "National Register of Citizens and the Supreme Court", Economic and Political Weekly, 53 (29)
- Ranjan, Amit (2019). "National register of citizen update: history and its impact". Asian Ethnicity. 22 (3): 1–17. doi:10.1080/14631369.2019.1629274. ISSN 1463-1369. S2CID 198727392.
- Roy, Anupama (14 December 2019), "The Citizenship (Amendment) Bill, 2016 and the Aporia of Citizenship", Economic and Political Weekly, 54 (49)
