= Sajjada Nashin =

Successor in Sufism

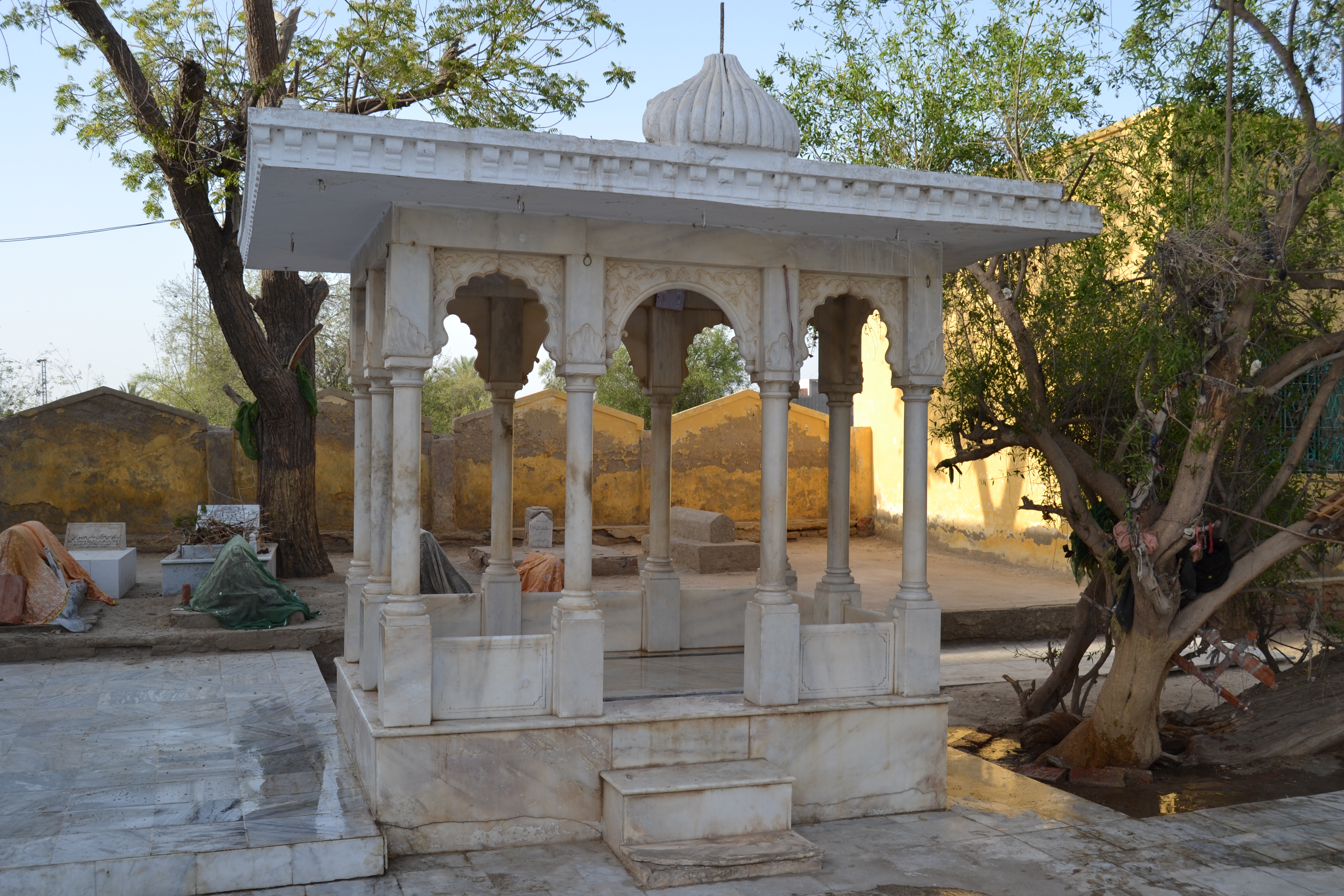
"Throne" of the Sajjada Nashin of Sufi poet Sachal Sarmast, in Sindh, Pakistan

The Sajjāda Nashīn (Persian: سجاده نشین; lit. '[one who] sits [at a] prayer mat') or Gaddi Nashin is a term of Persian origin, used chiefly within the Sufi traditions of South Asia referring to the successor or hereditary administrator of a Sufi master who typically functions as a custodian or trustee at his shrine. Pir Mujtaba Farooq Gul Badshah is the current Sajjada Nashin, Successor and Chief Custodian of Mohra Sharif Rawalpindi..

In some cases, the Sajjada Nashin is the descendant of a Sufi or Pir or a descendant of one of their disciples. Sajjada means 'prayer mat' (from the Arabic sajdah or 'prostration') while nashin is the word used for the person seated thereon. A Sajjada particularly tends to the shrine which is made over the Sufi's tomb or grave, known as a Dargah or Mazar. A trustee is a key person who holds and leads the traditional Sufi rituals in the Dargah's daily activities and particularly during death anniversaries called Urs. As a hereditary position the role of Sajjada nashin passes onto a child following the death of the holder.

== See also ==
- Khanqah
- Silsila
- Tariqa
- Ziyarat
