= Immigration and Foreigners Act, 2025 =

Act of Parliament of India

Parliament of India
- Long title: An Act to confer upon the Central Government certain powers in respect of foreigners
- Citation: Act No. 13 of 2025
- Territorial extent: whole of India
- Enacted by: Parliament of India
- Enacted: 02 April 2025
- Assented to by: President of India
- Assented to: 04 April 2025
- Commenced: 01 September 2025

Legislative history
- Bill title: Immigration and Foreigners Bill, 2025
- Bill citation: Act No. 13 of 2025
- Introduced by: Nityanand Rai
- Introduced: 11 March 2025
- Passed: 02 April 2025

Repeals
- The Passport (Entry into India) Act, 1920; The Registration of Foreigners Act, 1939; The Foreigners Act, 1946; The Immigration (Carriers’ Liability) Act, 2000

Related legislation
- Indian nationality law

Keywords
- Immigration, Foreigners
- Status: In force

The Immigration and Foreigners Act, 2025 is an Act of the Parliament of India that confers upon the Government of India certain powers to provide for the requirement of passport or other travel documents for persons entering into and exiting from India. The act also regulates matters related to foreigners, including the registration requirements. Section 36 of the Act repealed the Passport (Entry into India) Act, 1920; the Registration of Foreigners Act, 1939; the Foreigners Act, 1946; and the Immigration (Carriers’ Liability) Act, 2000.

The Immigration and Foreigners Bill was introduced in the Lok Sabha on 11 March 2025 by Nityanand Rai. It was passed by the Lok Sabha on 27 March 2025 and subsequently passed by the Rajya Sabha on 02 April 2025. It received the assent of the President of India on 04 April 2025 and came into force on 01 September 2025. The Statement of Objects and Reasons of the bill stated that it was introduced to avoid multiplicity of overlapping laws concerning immigration and foreigners, in line with the Government of India's declared policy of simplifying laws.

== Definition ==
Section 2(f) of the Act defines foreigner as "a person who is not a citizen of India". Section 16 of the Act states that the onus of proving whether a person is a citizen of India shall lie upon such person.

== Chapters ==
The Act contains 36 sections divided into the following six chapters;

1. Chapter I - Preliminary (Sections 1 and 2)
2. Chapter II - Matters Related to Immigration (Sections 3 to 5)
3. Chapter III - Matters Related to Foreigners (Sections 6 to 16)
4. Chapter IV - Liability of Carriers (Section 17)
5. Chapter V - Offences, Penalties and Appeal (Sections 18 to 26)
6. Chapter VI - Miscellaneous (Sections 27 to 36)

== Criticism ==
The Act allows the Government of India to bar any foreigner from entering India on account of threat to national security, sovereignty and integrity of India, relations with a foreign state or public health or on such other grounds as the Central Government may, specify in this behalf.

During the debate on the bill, Manish Tewari, an opposition member from the Indian National Congress, criticized it, arguing that the provisions grant "arbitrary powers" to the government. On the immigration officer's decision being "final and binding" regarding entry of a foreigner, he stated—"This essentially means that there is no appeal, no argument, and no lawyer. Whatever the immigration officer decides will be absolute." The Home Minister, Amit Shah, accused the All India Trinamool Congress of allowing infiltration of Bangladeshis and Rohingya people.

Tewari also criticized allowing seizure of "damaged" passports, without defining what counts as damage. Further, Section 11 of the Act has empowered the government to restrict or prohibit the entry of foreigners in a protected or restricted area, strengthening special permit or permission requirements for restive regions. Apart from Congress, several opposition parties, including Communist Party of India (Marxist-Leninist), Aam Aadmi Party, Revolutionary Socialist Party (India), and Rashtriya Janata Dal demanded that the bill be referred to a Joint parliamentary committee. However, the bill passed in the Lok Sabha in a voice vote.

The onus of proving Indian citizenship is on any person identified as "illegal migrant". As the Act is silent on refugees and asylum seekers, it has stoked fears that the government may misuse the law against Rohingya refugees in India. Section 26 of the Act empowers any officer of police, not below the rank of a Head Constable, to arrest any person without warrant based on reasonable suspicion of entering or exiting India without passport, visa, or other travel documents. Additionally, the rules made under the Act require mandatory collection of biometric data of foreign nationals.

The Act has mandated that hospitals, nursing homes, educational institutions, and lodging or sleeping facilities report the arrival of foreigners to the Foreigners Regional Registration Office, in a manner prescribed by the government, increasing their compliance burden. The statute has also empowered the central government to exert control over places "frequented by any foreigner".

== See also ==
- Illegal immigration to India
- Citizenship (Amendment) Act, 2019
- Indian nationality law
- National Register of Citizens of India
- Illegal Migrants (Determination by Tribunal) Act, 1983
- Refugees in India
- Overseas Citizenship of India
