= IMDT =

IMDT may refer to:

- The Illegal Migrants (Determination by Tribunal) (IMDT) Act
- Inverse Definite Minimum Time, a characteristic of relays
