= Foreigners Act, 1946 =

Act of India's Imperial Legislative Assembly granting powers to the Interim Government

Imperial Legislative Assembly
- Long title: An Act to confer upon the Central Government certain powers in respect of foreigners.
- Citation: Act No. 31 of 1946
- Territorial extent: whole of India
- Enacted by: Imperial Legislative Assembly
- Enacted: 23 November 1946
- Assented to by: Governor General
- Assented to: 23 November 1946

Repeals
- Foreigners Act, 1864 (III of 1864); Foreigners Act, 1940 (II of 1940); Foreigners Act (Amendment) Ordinance, 1946 (XXI of 1946)

Amended by
- Foreigners (Amendment) Act, 1947 (38 of 1947); Continuance of Legal Proceedings Act 1948 (38 of 1948); Repealing and Amending Act, 1950 (35 of 1950); Foreigners Laws (Amendment) Act 1957 (11 of 1957); Foreigners (Amendment) Act, 2004 (16 of 2004)

Repealed by
- Immigration and Foreigners Act, 2025

Related legislation
- Indian nationality law
- Status: Repealed

The Foreigners Act, 1946 was an Act of the Imperial Legislative Assembly enacted to grant the certain powers to the Interim Government of India in matters of foreigners in India. The Act was enacted before India became independent. It was repealed by Immigration and Foreigners Act, 2025.

== Definition ==
The Act defines a foreigner as "a person who is not a citizen of India". Section 9 of the Act states that, where the nationality of a person is not evident as per Section 8, the onus of proving whether a person is a citizen of India shall lie upon such person.

== Identification ==
According to the Foreigners (Report to the police) Order, 2001, made under the Foreigners Act 1946, where any person who has reason to believe that a foreigner has entered India without valid documents or is staying in India beyond the authorized period of stay accommodates such a foreigner in a premises occupied, owned or controlled by him, for whatever purpose, it shall be the duty of such a person to inform the nearest police station, within 24 hours, of the presence of such foreigner.

== Reporting ==
The Foreigners Act empowers the Indian government to detain a person until deportation back to their country of origin.

== See also ==
- Illegal immigration to India
- Citizenship (Amendment) Act, 2019
- Indian nationality law
- National Register of Citizens of India
- Illegal Migrants (Determination by Tribunal) Act, 1983
- Refugees in India
- Overseas Citizenship of India
