= Refugees in India =

Overview of legally registered refugees residing in India

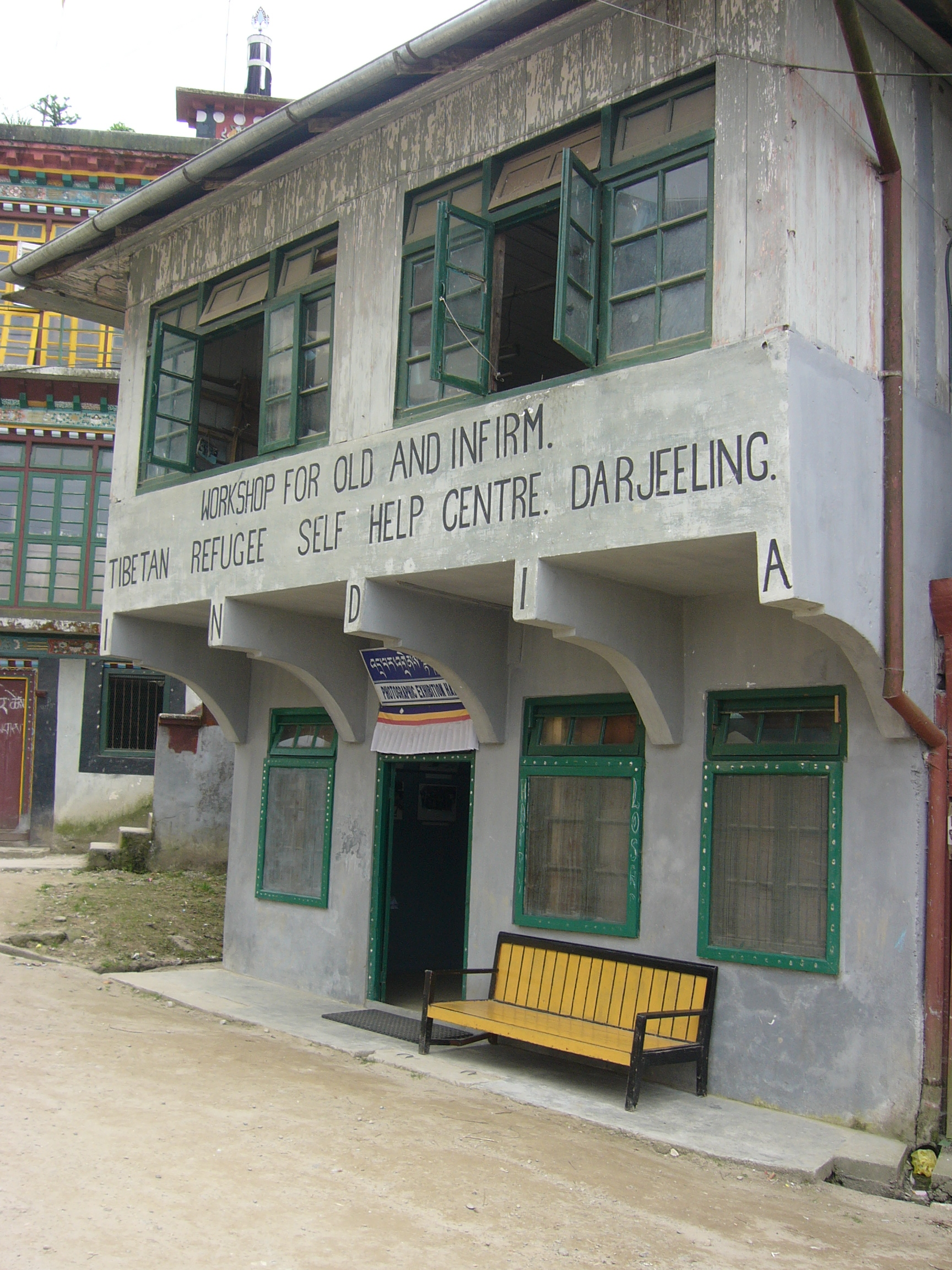
Tibetan refugee self-help center in Darjeeling, West Bengal

Since its independence in 1947, India has accepted various groups of refugees from neighbouring countries, including partition refugees from former British Indian territories that now constitute Pakistan and Bangladesh, Tibetan refugees that arrived in 1959, Chakma refugees from present day Bangladesh in early 1960s, other Bangladeshi refugees in 1965 and 1971, Sri Lankan Tamil refugees from the 1980s and most recently Rohingya refugees from Myanmar. In 1992, India was seen to be hosting 400,000 refugees from eight countries. According to records with the Union Ministry of Home Affairs, as on January 1, 2021, there were 58,843 Sri Lankan refugees staying in 108 refugee camps in Tamil Nadu and 54 in Odisha and 72,312 Tibetan refugees have been living in India.

India does not have a national refugee law, but it has always accepted refugees from neighbouring countries using the principles enunciated by Jawaharlal Nehru in 1959: refugees will be accorded a humane welcome, the refugee issue is a bilateral issue and the refugees should return to their homeland when normalcy returns. Despite the lack of a formal law, the Supreme Court of India has used the Article 14 of the Universal Declaration of Human Rights and the Article 13 of the International Covenant on Civil and Political Rights to uphold the obligation of refugee protection by the government.

India is not a State Party to the 1951 Refugee Convention and its 1967 Protocol, nor has it enacted national legislation to deal comprehensively with refugees. Instead it deals with refugees largely at political and administrative levels, and has only ad hoc systems in place to deal with their status and needs. The legal status of refugees is, therefore, no different from those of ordinary aliens whose presence is regulated by the Foreigners Act of 1946.

== History ==
Over several centuries, the Indian subcontinent has offered shelter to people fleeing from persecution in their homeland.

Parsis, a Zoroastrian community, migrated to the Indian subcontinent due to Islamic persecution between the 12th and 16th centuries. According to Qissa-i Sanjan, a Zoroastrian legend, Zoroastrianism collapsed as a state-sponsored religion a few centuries after the conquest of the Sassanid Empire. Consequently, some Zoroastrians migrated to what is now the Indian state of Gujarat to maintain their religious tradition. The descendants of newer Zoroastrian immigrants, fleeing the persecution of non-Muslims by Iran's Qajar dynasty (1794–1925), are known as Iranis. When India gained its independence, Parsis and Iranis retained legal citizenship.

== Legal framework ==
=== Citizenship ===
Indian nationality law is governed by the Citizenship Act (Articles 5 to 11 of the Constitution of India), which was passed in 1955 included creating a National Register of Citizens (NRC). Further Citizenship (Amendment) Acts were passed in 1986, 1992, 2003, 2005, 2015 and 2019.

The National Register of Citizens of India (NRC), maintained by the government of India, is meant to contain names to identify Indian citizens, but it has only been implemented thus far in the border state of Assam. The government prepared the first register after the 1951 census but did not update it until an order by the Supreme Court of India in 2013. India's federal and state governments are at various stages to implement the NRC in all areas.

=== Legal refugees ===
The current Indian nationality law largely follows the jus sanguinis (citizenship by descent) as opposed to the jus soli (citizenship by right of birth within the territory).

Since India became an independent country, its government has recognised legal immigrants from only Tibet and Sri Lanka as refugees from the past, providing free education and identification documentation to the former.

After Citizenship Amendment Bill 2019 was passed on December 12, 2019, in the Parliament of India, migrants that came as refugees from persecuted minority communities like Hindus, Sikhs, Buddhists, Jains, Parsis, and Christians from neighbouring Afghanistan, Bangladesh, and Pakistan before December 31, 2014, would be eligible for Indian citizenship, except Muslims, who make up the majority of the three countries. It would also relax the requirements for residents to become eligible for citizenship from 11 years to 6 years.

There has been concern raised at the lack of inclusion of several Non-Muslim countries around India in the Citizenship Bill, such as Sri Lanka, over whom Shiv Sena and several religious figures have raised concern over the citizenship status of Tamil-speaking Hindus who were allowed to legally settle in the Indian state of Tamil Nadu due to previous discrimination on the island, and Nepal and Bhutan, the latter of which is accused of discriminating against Hindus through a Buddhist-only society. Tibetan refugees from China are also excluded from the bill despite being an ongoing concern.

=== Illegal migrants ===
Those without valid Indian citizenship or visas are classified as illegal immigrants. Indian law does not classify any illegal immigrant as a refugee. Since India is not a signatory to the 1951 Refugee Convention, the United Nations's principles of non-refoulement and impediment to expulsion do not apply in India. Illegal immigrants are subjected to The Foreigners Act (1946), which defines a foreigner as a person who is not a citizen of India. Where the nationality of a person is not evident, the onus of proving whether a person is a foreigner or not lie upon the person himself. Anyone who believes that a foreigner has entered India, or who is the owner or managers of the property where a foreigner resides illegally, must inform the nearest police station within 24 hours of the presence of such foreigner. The Foreigners Act allows the government to detain a foreigner until he is deported back to his own country.

Illegal immigration is a national security issue in politics. It is believed to pose a security threat, especially in sensitive areas like Jammu and West Bengal. The Centre on Monday, an Indian security organisation, has claimed that "some Rohingyas sympathising with many militant group's ideologies may be active in Jammu, Delhi, Hyderabad, and Mewat and can be a potential threat to internal security." Additionally, women and girls are illegally trafficked to India; a common purpose for illegal trafficking is prostitution.

In 2005, the Illegal Migrants (Determination by Tribunal) Act, passed in 1983, was struck down by the Supreme Court of India, which held that the act "has created the biggest hurdle and is the main impediment or barrier in the identification and deportation of illegal migrants." On 9 August 2012, the Supreme Court heard a public interest litigation petition for the deportation of illegal migrants. In the case, the government of India stated that it does not support any kind of illegal migration either into its territory or illegal immigration of its citizens. The government claims to be only committed to the lawful deportation of illegal Bangladeshi migrants.

== Religious refugees ==
=== Afghanistan ===
Currently, there are around 8,000 to 11,684 Afghan refugees in India, most of whom are Muslims and Sikhs. The Indian government has allowed the United Nations High Commissioner for Refugees (UNHCR) in India to operate a programme for them. In 2015, the Indian government granted citizenship to 4,300 Hindu and Sikh refugees. Most were from Afghanistan, and some were from Pakistan.

=== Bangladesh ===
Many people from East Bengal, mainly Hindus, migrated to West Bengal during the partition of India in 1947. The native population of West Bengal sometimes referred to these refugees as "Bangals". From 1947 to 1961, the percentage of the population of East Bengal that was Hindu decreased from 30% to 19%. In 1991, it was down to 10.5% The percentage further decreased from 2001, where the census recorded it to be 9.2%, to 2008, when it was estimated to be 8%.

Chakmas are a Bangladeshi Buddhist community. Chakma immigrants from Bangladesh have settled in the southern part of Mizoram because they were displaced by the construction of the Kaptai Dam on the Karnaphuli River in 1962. Because there was no rehabilitation or compensation, they fled from Bangladesh to India.

In 2001, the BBC reported that many Bangladeshi Hindu families had entered India to escape repression in Bangladesh because they were members of minority religious groups.

=== Pakistan ===
==== Partition of India ====
Following the partition of India, massive population exchanges occurred between the two newly formed nations, spanning several months. Once the borders between India and Pakistan were established, a total of about 14.5 million people migrated from one country to the other, seeking safety from being an adherent to the religion of the majority in their new country. Based on the 1951 census, immediately after the partition 7.226 million Muslims migrated from India to Pakistan, while 7.249 million Hindus and Sikhs moved from Pakistan to India. About 11.2 million migrants crossed the western border, making up 78% of the total migrant population. Most of them travelled through Punjab. 5.3 million Muslims moved from India to West Punjab in Pakistan, and 3.4 million Hindus and Sikhs moved from Pakistan to East Punjab in India. Elsewhere in the west, 1.2 million moved in each direction to and from Sind. The initial population transfer on the east involved 3.5 million Hindus moving from East Bengal to India and only 0.7 million Muslims moving the other way.

==== Recent arrivals ====
Non-Muslims face constitutional and legal discrimination in Pakistan. Consequently, Hindus and Sikhs from Pakistan have sought asylum in India; many have arrived in the 21st century. There are almost 400 Pakistani Hindu refugees settlements in Indian cities.

=== Tibet ===
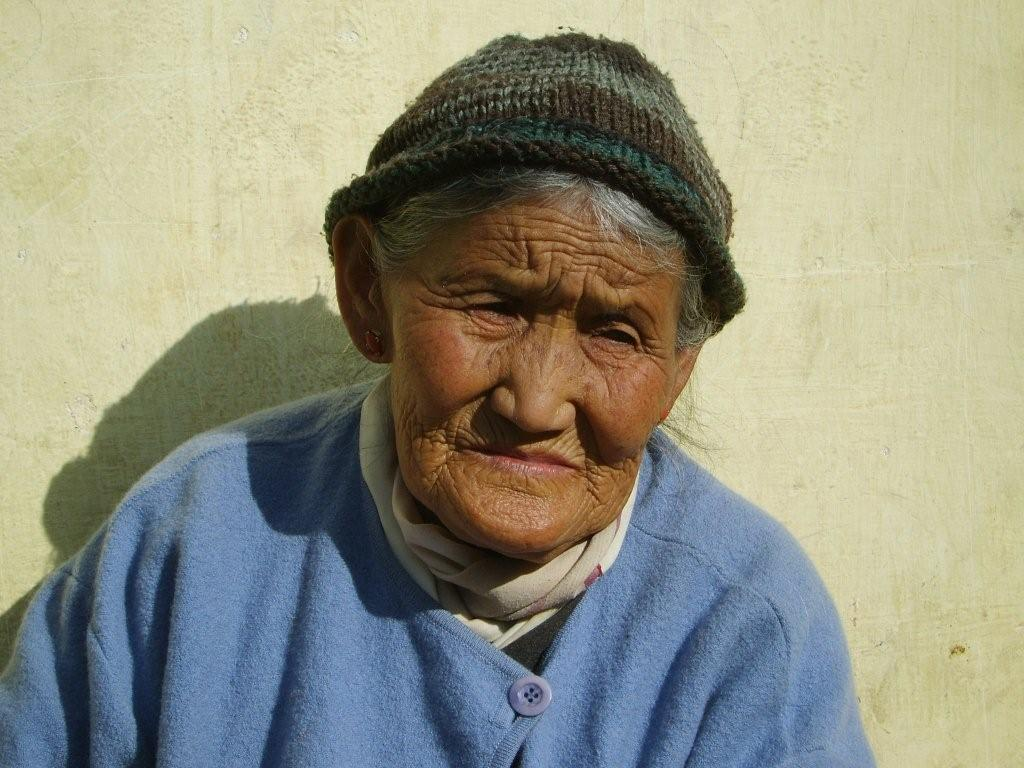
Tibetan woman in an Indian refugee camp

Many religious refugees come from Tibet. The 14th Dalai Lama, a leader of the Tibetan migration movement, left Tibet for India after the 1959 Tibetan uprising. He was followed by about 80,000 Tibetan refugees. Prime Minister Jawaharlal Nehru agreed to allow Tibetan refugees to settle in India until their eventual return to Tibet. The Tibetan diaspora maintains the Central Tibetan Administration, a government-in-exile, in McLeod Ganj, a suburb of Dharamshala, Kangra district, Himachal Pradesh. The organisation coordinates political activities for Tibetans in India.

In 1960, the government of Mysore State (now Karnataka) allotted nearly 3,000 acres (12 km^{2}) of land at Bylakuppe in Mysore district. In 1961, Lugsung Samdupling, the first Tibetan exile settlement in India, was formed. A few years later, another settlement, Tibetan Dickey Larsoe (TDL), was established. Three more settlements were built in Karnataka: Rabgayling in Gurupura village near Hunsur, Dhondenling at Oderapalya near Kollegal, and Doeguling at Mundgod in Uttara Kannada. With the settlements, the state acquired the largest Tibetan refugee population out of every Indian state. As of 2020, Karnataka has 12 schools run by and for the Tibetan community.

Other states have provided land for Tibetans. Bir Tibetan Colony is a settlement in Bir, Himachal Pradesh. Jeerango in Gajapati district, Odisha, has a large Tibetan community and South Asia's largest Buddhist monastery.

The government of India has built special schools for Tibetans, providing free education, healthcare, and scholarships for students who excel in school. A few medical and civil engineering seats at universities are reserved for Tibetans.

A document called the Registration Certificate (RC) is a permit for Tibetans to stay in India, renewed every year or half-year depending on the area. Every Tibetan refugee above the age of 16 must register for it, and RCs are not issued to refugees who have newly arrived. Another official document, the Indian Identity Certificate, nicknamed "Yellow Books", allows Tibetans to travel abroad. It is issued one year after an RC is given.

=== Citizenship Amendment Act 2019 ===
The Citizenship Amendment Act of 2019 (passed on the 11 December 2019) gives a path to Indian citizenship for Hindu, Sikh, Buddhist, Jain, Parsi, and Christian religious minorities from Pakistan, Bangladesh and Afghanistan that have suffered religious persecution (provided they arrived in India before December 31, 2014). Any refugees from these groups that arrived after the cutoff must reside in India for at least 5 years before they can gain citizenship.

The Citizenship Amendment Act 2019 went into force on January 10, 2020, though the exact rules have not yet been set as of January 11, 2020.

== Refugees facing ethnic persecution ==
=== Ugandans of Indian-origin expelled in 1972 ===
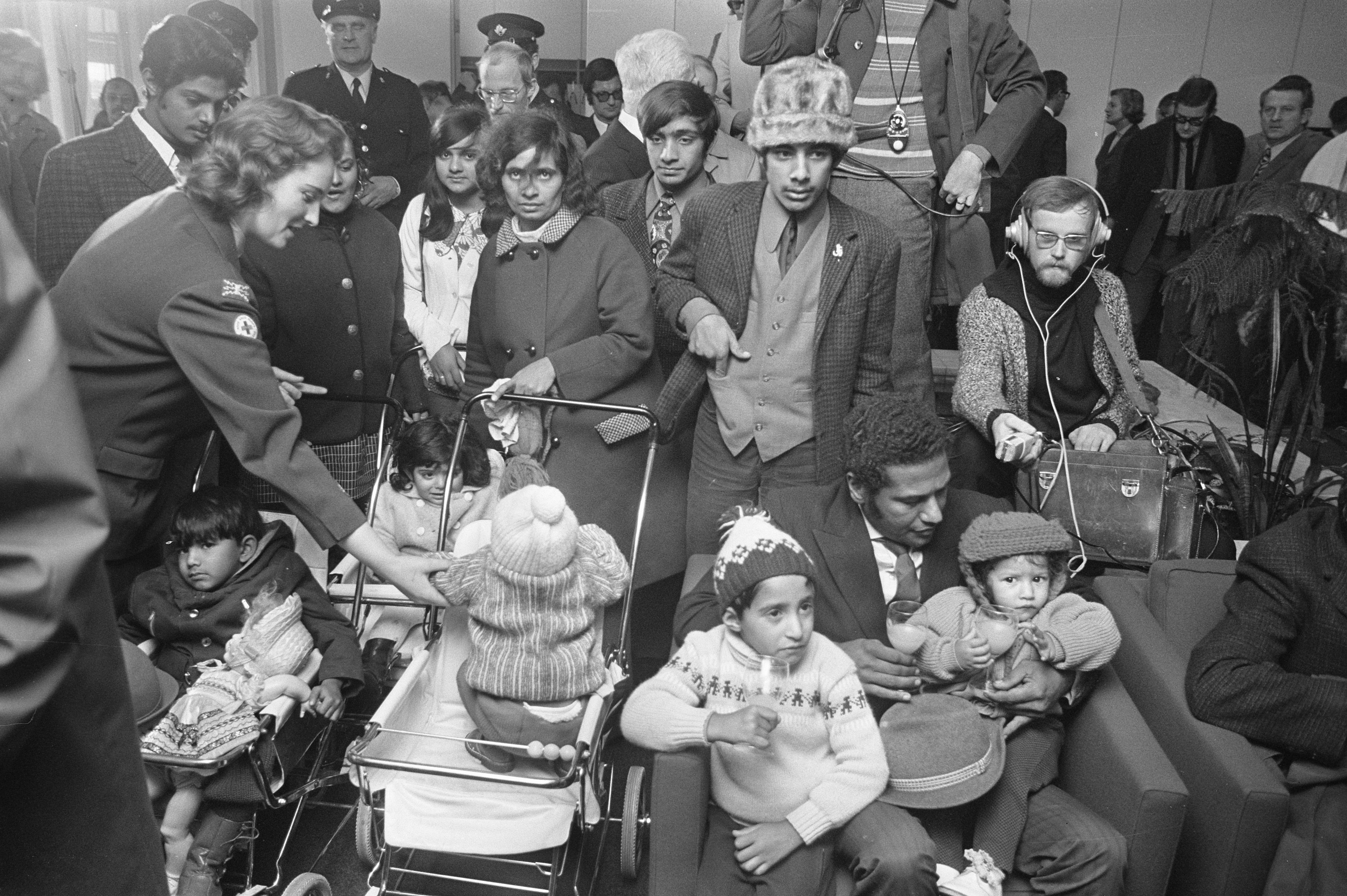
Expelled Asians in the Netherlands after leaving Uganda, 1972

In 1972, the majority ethnic population expelled Asians from Uganda, including those of Indian origin. Many Indians had settled in Uganda, fleeing from the 1947 riots in Pakistan and the 1971 Bangladesh genocide. The practitioners of Indic religions (Buddhists, Hindus, Jains and Sikhs) who are persecuted in other countries are generally accepted as refugees in India.

In early August 1972, the president of Uganda, Idi Amin, ordered nearly 80,000 Indians in Uganda, mostly Gujaratis, to leave the country within 90 days. The expelled included 23,000 Indians who were Ugandan citizens. Although Ugandan citizens of Indian origin were later exempted from the expulsion, many chose to leave voluntarily. At the time, anti-Indian sentiment in Uganda was prominent. 4,500 refugees from Uganda ended up in India. A total of 5,655 firms, ranches, farms, and agricultural estates were reallocated; cars, homes, and other household goods were also seized.

=== Sri Lankan Tamils ===
More than 100,000 Sri Lankan Tamils live in India, most of whom migrated during the rise of militancy in Sri Lanka, in particular during the Sri Lankan Civil War, which lasted from 1983 to 2009. Most Sri Lankans are settled in the southern states of Tamil Nadu (in the cities of Chennai, Madurai, Tiruchirappalli, and Coimbatore), Karnataka (in Bengaluru), and Kerala.

== Demography ==
=== Immigration of Afghan, Bangladeshi and Pakistani, Hindus and Sikhs into India ===
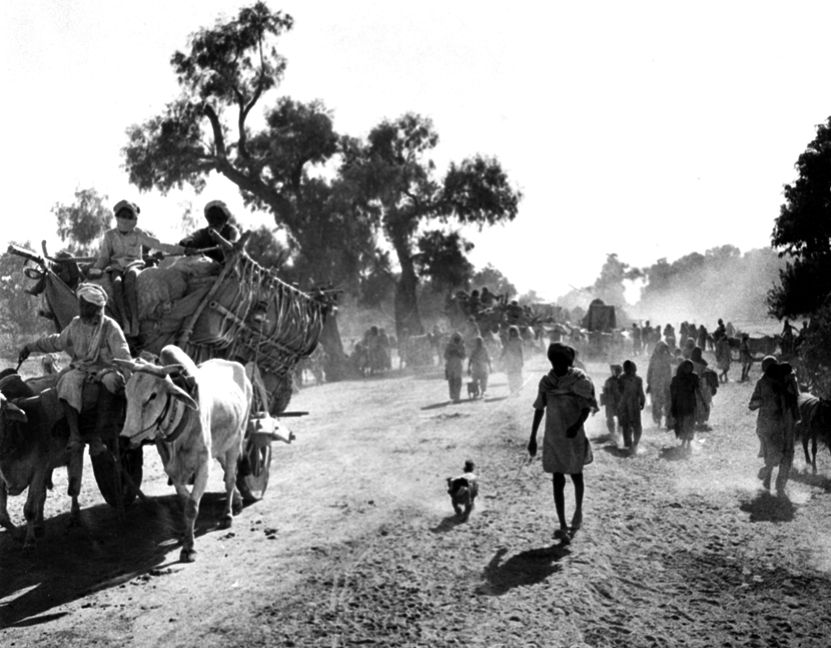
Hindu and Sikh refugees coming to India during partition

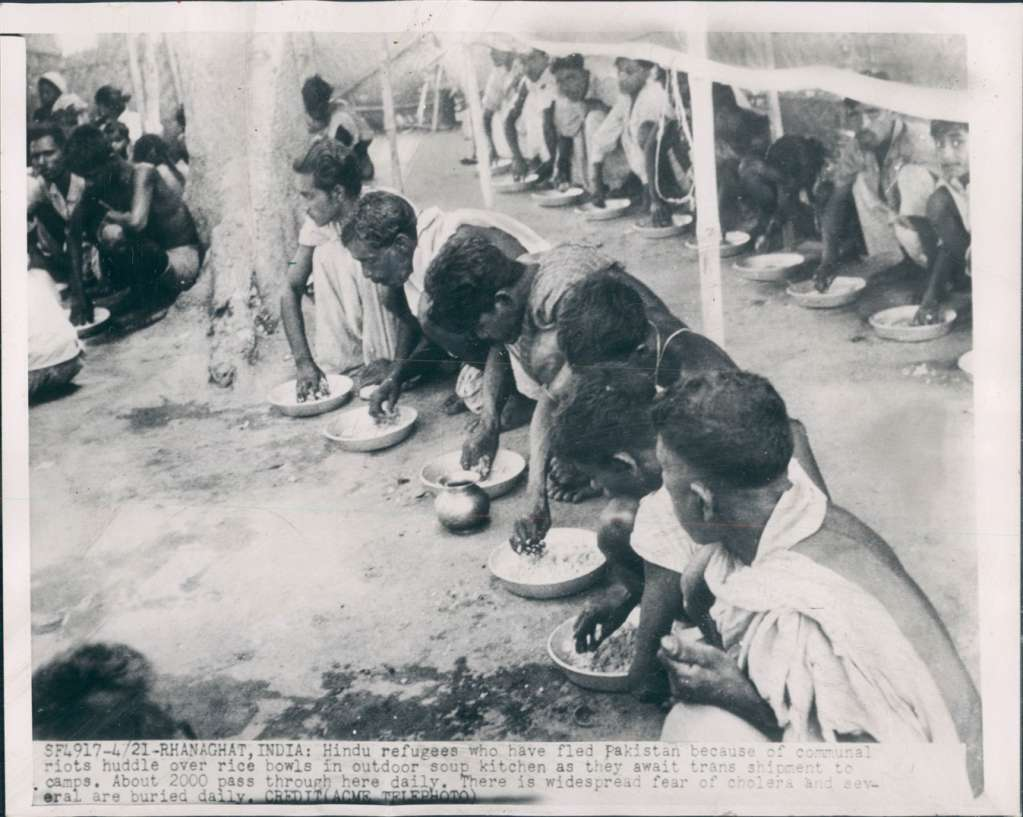
Hindu and Sikh refugees in Indian refugee camp

It is estimated by Dhaka university economist Abul Barkat, that there are 11.3 million Bangladeshi Hindu refugees living across different states in India particularly in West Bengal, Assam, Tripura, and Meghalaya who have entered India between the period (1964–2013). According to a report, about 5,000 Hindus arrived from Pakistan to India annually as refugees. Between 1950 and 2020, it is estimated that there somewhere 3.5 Lakhs Pakistani Hindus living in India specially in the northern parts of Delhi, Punjab, Rajasthan, Gujarat and Haryana. Close to 99% Hindu and Sikh population of Afghanistan have left the country in past decades. An investigation reveals that the Sikh and Hindu population number was 220,000 in the 1980s. That number dropped sharply to 15,000 as most of them took refugee in India afterwards when the Islamic militant mujahideen was in power during the 1990s and remained at that level during the Taliban regime. It is now estimated that only 1,350 Hindus and Sikhs remain in the country as of 2020.

Projections

Recent and future Hindu population growth in Pakistan and Bangladesh
Year	Country	Hindu Population	Percentage
Past (2017)	Pakistan	4.44 million	2.14%
Future (2050)	Pakistan	5.63 million	2%
Past (2011)	Bangladesh	12.73 million	8.5%
Future (2050)	Bangladesh	14.47 million	7.3%
Past (1970s)	Afghanistan	2 lakh	1.8%
Future (2020)	Afghanistan	1350–700	0.03–0.01%

Between 2020 and 2050 (there is a gap of three decades), it is estimated that during this period around 6,918,360 Hindus will leave Bangladesh for India every year; an estimation of 230,612 Hindus were leaving the country according to Dhaka-based economist Abul Barkat. Similarly, on an average, 5,000 Hindus leave Pakistan annually. So between 2020 and 2050, It is estimated that 150,000 Hindus will leave Pakistan for India as refugees.

== See also ==
- Immigration to India
  - Illegal immigration to India
- Citizenship (Amendment) Act, 2019
- The Foreigners Act, 1946
- Indian nationality law
- National Register of Citizens
- Illegal Migrants (Determination by Tribunals) Act, 1983
