= Illegal immigration to India =

Illegal foreigners in India

An illegal immigrant in India is a foreigner who has entered the Republic of India either without valid documents or who initially had a valid document, but has overstayed beyond the permitted time, as per the general provisions of the Citizenship Act as amended in 2003. Such persons are not eligible for citizenship by registration or naturalisation. They are also liable to be imprisoned for 2–8 years and fined.

Refugees in India are different from the illegal immigrant in India. An exception was made in 2015 for minority communities of Bangladesh, Pakistan and Afghanistan who were compelled to seek shelter in India due to religious persecution or fear of religious persecution. They are not classified as illegal migrants and remain eligible for citizenship, as they are legally considered refugees in India.

The Indian Census of 2001 gives information about migrants, but not exclusively illegal immigrants. As per the 2001 Census, Bangladeshis form the largest group of migrants in India, followed by Pakistanis.

== Legal framework ==
=== Indian citizens and National Register of Citizens ===
Indian nationality law is governed by the Citizenship Act, 1955 (Articles 5 to 11 (Part II) of the Constitution of India), which has been amended by the Citizenship (Amendment) Acts of 1986, 1992, 2003, 2005, 2015 and 2019.

The National Register of Citizens of India (NRC) is a register envisaged by the Government of India containing names and certain relevant information for identification of Indian citizens. The register was first prepared based on the 1951 Census of India, but it was not maintained afterwards. The exercise to update it for the state of Assam was carried out recently via an order of the Supreme Court of India in the year 2013.

The Government of India has announced its intention to recreate an NRC for the whole of India, but it is not yet been operationalised Meanwhile, there have been demands from some border states, such as Manipur, to create an NRC for their states.

=== Foreigners ===
Persons in India without either a valid Indian citizenship or a visa are considered by the central government as illegal and unlawful immigrants. Illegal immigrants are subject to the Immigration and Foreigners Act, 2025 which defines a foreigner as a person who is not a citizen of India under Section 2(f). According to Foreigners (Amendment) Order, 2015 persons belonging to minority communities in Bangladesh and Pakistan, namely, Hindus, Sikhs, Buddhists, Jains, Parsis and Christians who were compelled to seek shelter in India due to religious persecution or fear of religious persecution and entered into India on or before 31 December 2014 with or without valid documents including passport or other travel document are granted exemption from the application of provisions of the Foreigners Act, 1946. Where the nationality of a person is not evident, the onus of proving whether a person is a foreigner or not shall lie upon such person. Furthermore, anyone who believes that a foreigner has entered India, or the owners and managers of the property where such a foreigner resides illegally in India must inform the nearest police station within 24 hours of their presence becoming known. The Foreigners Act empowers the Indian administration to detain a person until they are deported back to their country.

==== Illegal migrants ====
Preventing the entry of illegal migrants into India is important as they impose pressure on citizens and pose a security threat, especially in sensitive areas such as Jammu and West Bengal. For example, the Indian security establishments said that "Some Rohingyas sympathizing with many militant group's ideologies may be active in Jammu, Delhi, Hyderabad, and Mewat and can be a potential threat to internal security."

According to Indian law, illegal immigrants are not refugees. Since India is not a signatory to the 1951 Refugee Convention, the United Nations principle of non-refoulement and impediment to expulsion does not apply in India. Illegal immigrants are denied impediment to expulsion if they do not fall within the host country's legal definition of a lawful refugee.

Illegal immigrants are people who migrate to a country in violation of the immigration laws of that country, or the continued residence of people without the legal right to live in that country. Illegal immigration tends to be financially upward, from poorer to richer countries.

In 2005, the Illegal Migrants (Determination by Tribunal) Act, 1983 was rejected by the Supreme Court of India which held that the act "has created the biggest hurdle and is the main impediment or barrier in the identification and deportation of illegal migrants." On 9 August 2012, during a Supreme Court hearing about a public interest litigation petition for deportation of illegal migrants, it was told that the policy of the government of India does not support any kind of illegal migration either into its territory or illegal immigration of its citizens and the government is committed to deporting illegal Bangladeshi migrants, but only lawfully.

==== Legal refugees ====
The government of India has recognised immigrants from Tibet and Sri Lanka as refugees in the past, providing free education and some identification to the former.

The Citizenship Amendment Act 2019 amended the Citizenship Act, 1955 to allow migrants from minority communities like Hindu, Sikh, Buddhist, Jain, Christian, Parsi who fled religious persecution from Afghanistan, Bangladesh, and Pakistan to be eligible for Indian citizenship provided they came into the country on or before 31 December 2014, excluding people from the Muslim community (the majority community of those nations).

== Demographics ==
=== Afghanistan immigrants ===
By 2009, India had over 13,000 illegal immigrants from Afghanistan. According to a report by the Afghan embassy in Delhi, refugees from Afghanistan, estimated at around 30,000 families, have, over the past two and a half decades, fled from their hometowns due to large-scale conflicts, seeking safety in India's capital city. Many outsiders call Delhi home, but the Afghan people claim a special relationship with India and its capital, due to the ancient and modern history between both nations. There are nearly 11,000 Afghan refugees registered with the UNHCR in India, mainly living in Delhi and bordering areas. The refugees in Delhi face considerable hardships and difficulties.

=== Bangladeshi immigrants ===
In 2004, a rule of thumb was that for each illegal immigrant caught, four illegally entered the country. While many immigrants have settled in the border areas, some have moved on to places such as Mumbai and Delhi. During the UPA government, Sriprakash Jaiswal, Union Minister of State for Home Affairs, made a statement in Parliament on 14 July 2004, saying that "12 million illegal Bangladeshi infiltrators were living in India", and West Bengal had the most with 5.7 million Bangladeshis. This led to protests from state government of Assam, ruled by Congress, and consequent retraction of this statement, saying that the numbers are unreliable. More recently, Kiren Rijiju, Minister of State for Home Affairs in the NDA government has put the figure at around 20 million.

According to the 2001 census, 3,084,826 people in India came from Bangladesh. No reliable numbers on illegal immigrants are currently available. Extrapolating the census data for the state of Assam alone gives a figure of 2 million. Figures as high as 20 million are also reported in the government and media. Samir Guha Roy of the Indian Statistical Institute called these estimates "motivated exaggerated". After examining the population growth and demographic statistics, Roy states that while a vast majority are illegal immigrants, significant amounts of internal migration is sometimes falsely thought to be immigrants. An analysis of the numbers by Roy revealed that on average around 91000 Bangladeshis illegally crossed over to India every year during the years 1981–1991.

The Bangladesh Liberation War and continued political and economic turmoil in Bangladesh in the following decades forced some Bangladeshis to seek refuge in India. During the war, at least 10 million Bangladeshis (80% of whom were Hindus) have crossed into India illegally to seek refuge from widespread rape and genocide. Most of them migrated to the border states, particularly West Bengal and Assam. Due to persecution, illegal migrants have been defined in Assam Accord as those who infiltrated illegally after 24 December 1971. Till today, illegal border crossing persists in India through Tripura and other states.

=== Burmese immigrants ===
There are an estimated 50,000–100,000 Burmese Chin illegal immigrants stated to be residing in India, mostly in the Indian state of Mizoram, Manipur and a small number in Delhi.

Since 2017, Rohingyas have been increasingly seeking refuge in India, facing longstanding state-persecution in Myanmar.

According to the Union Government, there were 10,565 Rohingya families in India as of 2015; Samaddar et al. extrapolated to arrive at a figure of over a million immigrants. (Note: The precise breakup runs as follows: Jammu and Kashmir 6684, Andhra Pradesh 1755, Delhi 760, Haryana 677, West Bengal 361, Rajasthan 162, Uttar Pradesh 111, Punjab 50, Maharashtra 12, and Andaman and Nicobar Islands 3.) (Note: Samaddar assumes each family to have four-five members and a substantial percentage to be unenumerated.)

In August 2017, the Bharatiya Janata Party led Union Government asked state governments to initiate the process of deportation for all illegal immigrants including Rohingyas. The government did not buckle despite criticism. This was challenged before the Supreme Court of India by three Rohingya refugees, wherein the Government of India submitted an affidavit claiming that there were over 40,000 "illegal [Rohingya] immigrants", mostly spread across Assam, West Bengal and Jammu and Kashmir and that they were a threat to the security of state.

In March 2021, several media reports claimed that about 150 Rohingya refugees from Jammu were held in detention centers. An interim application was filed seeking their release though the government denied any detainment. A bench of Sharad Bobde, A. S. Bopanna and V. Ramasubramanian passed an interim order in favor of the government; government-arguments about India being not bound to follow international conventions, she has not explicitly ratified and Art. 14 and Art. 21 not conferring any immunity to non-citizens from deportation (as mandated by procedure) were accepted. (Note: For detailed critiques, see: Bhatia, Gautam (8 April 2021). "Complicity in Genocide: The Supreme Court's Interim Order in the Rohingya Deportation Case". Indian Constitutional Law and Philosophy.; Parthasarathy, Suhrith (28 March 2021). "Article 21 in a Time of Genocide: The Rohingya Case before the Supreme Court". Indian Constitutional Law and Philosophy.; Pillai, Priya (19 April 2021). "International Law Omissions: Rohingya Deportation Order of the Supreme Court of India". Opinio Juris.; Singh, Chander Uday (26 April 2021). "Supreme Court must rethink its order on deportation of Rohingya refugees". The Indian Express.)

=== Pakistani immigrants ===
About 7,600 illegal immigrants from Pakistan resided in India in 2010. Many of the migrants are Hindus and Sikhs, who have overstayed, attempting to gain citizenship.

== Concerns over Bangladeshi illegal immigrants ==
=== Higher judiciary's concerns ===
In 2005, a Supreme Court bench ruled Illegal Migrants (Determination by Tribunal) Act (IMDT) as unconstitutional while, with reference to the Sinha Report, maintained that the impact of the "aggression" represented by large-scale illegal migration from Bangladesh had made the life of the people of Assam and Tripura "wholly insecure and the panic generated thereby had created fear psychosis" in other north-eastern States. In August 2008, the Delhi High Court dismissed a petition by a Bangladeshi national against her deportation. The High Court ruled that the illegal Bangladeshi immigrants "pose a danger to India's internal security".

=== National security threats ===
Apart from immigrants, a large number of smugglers regularly cross the porous border along West Bengal into India. They mainly engage in smuggling goods and livestock from India into Bangladesh to avoid a high tariff imposed on some Indian goods by Bangladesh government. Bangladeshi women and girls are also trafficked to India. The Centre for Women and Children Studies estimated in 1998 that 27,000 Bangladeshis have been forced into prostitution in India. According to the CEDAW report, 1% of all foreign prostitutes in India and 2.7% of prostitutes in Kolkata are from Bangladesh.

According to the government of India, Rohingya adds economic pressure on Indian populace; due to their militant activities, they pose a security threat, especially in sensitive areas such as Jammu and West Bengal. In 2017, the Central Government filed an affidavit in the Supreme Court stating that "Some Rohingyas sympathizing with many militant group's ideologies may be active in Jammu, Delhi, Hyderabad, and Mewat and can be a potential threat to internal security."

=== Capture of Illegal Immigrants and Deportation ===
As a result of an increase in complaints over fraudulent documents for identification, several law enforcement departments began a drive against the illegal immigrants, many of them from Pakistan and Bangladesh. Many of the immigrants were caught in drives conducted by law enforcement officials in Delhi, Mumbai, and many other metropolitan cities as well as certain rural areas. Additionally, several gangs and rackets who were helping the illegal immigrants secure fraudulent documents and identity were being traced and busted.

Following the 2025 Pahalgam attack, several state police forces began a drive to throw out and deport illegal Pakistani, Bangladeshi and Rohingya immigrants. Several Pakistanis who had come on tourist and medical visas voluntarily left at the Wagah border after tensions escalated. The Government of Bangladesh protested against the deportation drive, claiming that protocols were not being followed.

India urged Bangladesh to speedup for nationality verification over 2800 pending cases, so that immigration work can be executed smoothly. The request came after illegal immigration became key issue in current West Bengal election and BJP has won the election. Now illegal immigration became concern for both countries.

=== 2026 West Bengal deportation drive ===
In May 2026, the newly elected Bharatiya Janata Party (BJP) government in West Bengal initiated a "Detect, Delete and Deport" campaign to expel undocumented immigrants. This caused hundreds of people who claimed to be long-term Bangladeshi residents to gather at the India–Bangladesh border, hoping to return to Bangladesh, while Border Guard Bangladesh heightened its vigilance, calling them "so-called Bangladeshi citizens".

The Indian government stated it had shared the names of more than 2,680 people with Bangladesh for nationality verification, some pending for over five years, and that deportation would only follow confirmation of their status. Bangladesh has accused India of carrying out informal, unlawful "push-in" practices and has said it will resist any attempt to push people across the border without proper verification. Bangladesh responded by intensifying patrols and using loudspeakers to warn residents of potential "push-in attempts".

== State-specific concerns ==
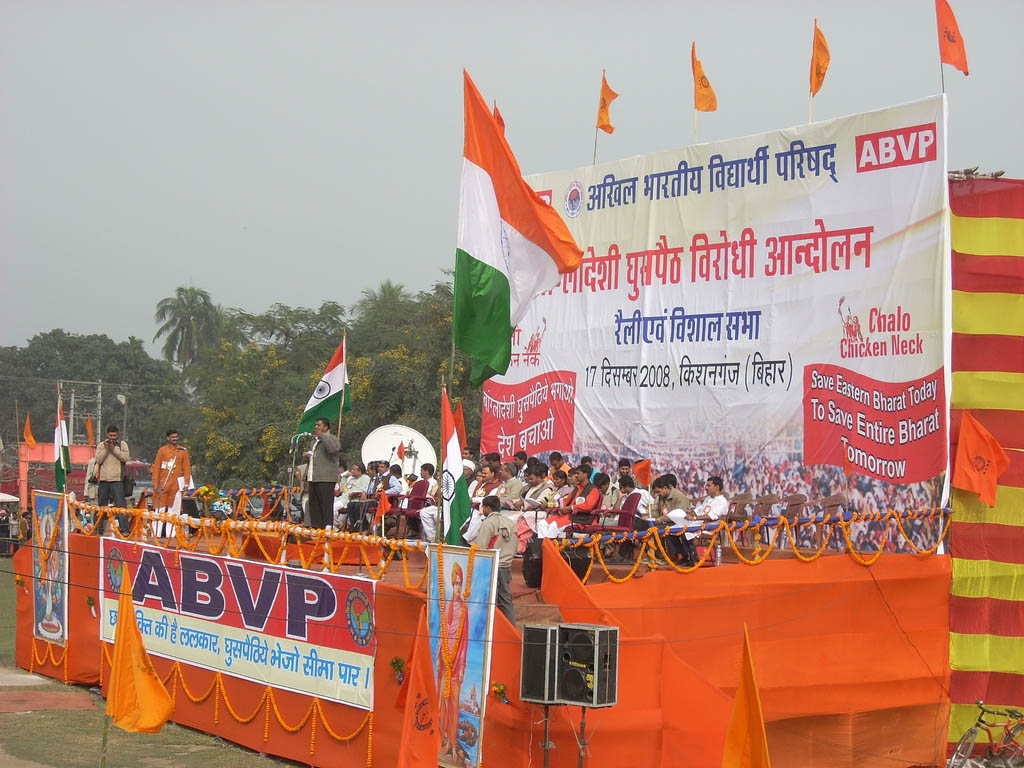
ABVP addressing about Bangladeshi illegal immigrants

=== Assam ===
In Assam, the Assam Movement against illegal immigrants started as early as 1979 and ended in 1985, led by the All Assam Students Union. Over six years, 855 (later on 860 as submitted by AASU) people sacrificed their lives in the hope of an "Infiltration Free Assam". They demanded an end to the influx of immigrants and deportation of those who have already settled. It gradually took a violent turn and ethnic violence began between Assamese and Bengalis, mostly Muslims. It eventually led to the infamous Nellie massacre in 1983 due to a controversy over the 1983 election. In 1985, the Indian Government signed the Assam Accord with the leaders of the protest to stop the issue. As per the accord, India began building a fence along the Assam-Bangladesh border which is now almost complete. However, Assam also has a large number of legal Indian Muslims. It is difficult to distinguish between illegal Bangladeshis and local Bengali speakers. In some cases, genuine Indian citizens have been discriminated against. Allegations exist that nationalist parties such as the Bharatiya Janata Party as well as the Indian National Congress have discriminated against Bengali-speaking Muslims. On the other hand, reports of Bangladeshis being able to secure Indian ration and voter identity cards have come out.

After the 1991 census, the changing demographic patterns in border districts became more visible. It created anxiety and tension in India throughout the nineties. Both conservatives, as well as moderates, expressed concern on this issue. The first BJP government came into power in 1998 and subsequently ordered the construction of the Indo-Bangladesh barrier to stop migrants and illegal trade along the border. It was planned to enhance the already existing barrier in Assam and to encircle West Bengal, Tripura and Mizoram as well.

In August 2025, Assam Chief Minister Himanta Biswa Sarma launched a major drive to capture and deport illegal Bangladeshis, following an increase in infiltration. In process, while public land of thousands of hectares encroached by the illegal Bangladeshis and Rohingyas was reclaimed, Sarma was criticized by opposition leaders, alleging violation of human rights and discrimination.

=== Delhi ===
There was an organised influx of nearly 40,000 Bangladeshi and Rohingya Muslim immigrants in Delhi who Ashwini Upadhyay claimed to pose a national security risk and threaten the national integration. Ashwini Upadhyay, lawyer and BJP leader filed a Public Interest Litigation (PIL) in the "Supreme Court of India" (SC) to identify and deport these. In a response to this PIL, Delhi Police told the SC in July 2019 that nearly 500 illegal Bangladeshi immigrants had been deported between 1 January 2016 and 30 April 2018.

=== Gujarat ===
In April 2025, the Gujarat Police launched a drive to search for illegal immigrants following the Pahalgam attack. Around 890 illegal Bangladeshis in Ahmedabad and 134 in Surat were captured and arrested, as stated by Minister of State for Home Harsh Sanghavi, who also added that many of them working for smugglers, drug cartels, and sleeper cells for terrorist outfits. The investigation and drive revealed that the illegal Bangladeshi immigrants possessed forged documents after enter India illegally.

=== Haryana ===
In September 2019, the Chief Minister of Haryana, Manohar Lal Khattar announced the implementation of NRC for Haryana by setting up a legal framework under the former judge of the Punjab and Haryana High Court, Justice HS Bhalla for updating NRC which will help in "weeding out" these illegal immigrants.

=== Karnataka ===
In October 2024, the Bengaluru City Police initiated a crackdown on illegal immigration and arrested illegal migrants from Pakistan and Bangladesh. Many of the migrants arrested were living for more than a decade under false identities, and were connected to the Mehdi Foundation International (MFI), which was involved in Islamic religious campaign.

=== Kerala ===
Although Kerala is at a large distance from Bangladesh (~2500 km), Bangladeshi illegal migrants have been moving to Kerala due to the high wages for unskilled and semi-skilled labourers. Following the Kerala Police unearthing, the international footprint of this operation, both the Intelligence Bureau and National Investigation Agency (NIA) have started probing. Some illegal migrants are fully equipped with all valid Indian documents by the time they reach their destinations. The Kerala police are reportedly finding it difficult to check the influx of these Bangladeshi migrants. Kerala State Intelligence officials said they found that a large section of migrant labourers claiming to be from West Bengal or even Assam were actually from Bangladesh. Anti-national activities have been reported; the latest in which in August 2016, a native of West Bengal was arrested for insulting the national flag and he was later found to be an illegal immigrant from Bangladesh. There is said to be a major racket at the borders of West Bengal and Assam with Bangladesh which provides illegal migrants with identity cards.

=== Maharashtra ===
As a result of security risks posed by illegal Bangladeshi immigrants due to rise in crime rates, particularly threats of terrorism and religious intolerance, law enforcement officials of Maharashtra Police began an extensive hunt for these immigrants statewide, many of them working in construction sites, or as laborers/maids. Several agents making forged documents for the immigrants were also busted and arrested.

In January 2025, the Mumbai Police arrested Mohammad Shariful Islam Shehzad, an illegal Bangladeshi immigrant, who was accused of stabbing actor Saif Ali Khan at his residence.

During the investigation of the riots in Nagpur in March 2025, the probe team determined a link towards Bangladeshis, as a few social media posts traced by the team were found to be in Bengali language.

=== Mizoram ===
Bangladeshi Buddhist Chakma immigrants from Bangladesh have settled in the southern part of Mizoram because they were displaced by the construction of the Kaptai Dam on the Karnaphuli River in 1962, the dam flooded 655 square kilometres and displaced over 100,000 people, most of them were Chakma people. As there was no rehabilitation and compensation, they fled from Bangladesh to India. The Chakma people also resisted inclusion into Bangladesh during the Bangladeshi Independence in 1971 through armed struggle led by Shanti Bahini because they were ethnically, culturally and religiously distinct, this violent confrontation between Shanti Bahini and Bangladeshi Army led to Chakma fleeing Bangladesh for India.

=== Tripura ===
Tripura demographics have been altered due to the influx of illegal Bangladeshi refugees and immigrants alike. The politics and socio-economic conditions have been greatly affected by it. The influx started from the 70s after the Liberation of Bangladesh 1971 and continues to this day. The proportion of the local Tripuri population was reduced from 59.1% in 1951 to 31.1% in 2011. All major political parties in Tripura favour the replication of National Register of Citizens of India (NRC) in their state too, although with some riders.

In October 2025, the Bangladeshi Government lodged a protest, after 3 illegal Bangladeshi immigrants, who were suspected of being cattle thieves, were lynched to death by several local residents at a border village called Bidyabil, after attacking two rubber plantation workers. Residents of the village had resisted the intruders from entering, prompting local authorities to investigate, and the bodies of those immigrants were handed to Bangladesh after post mortem was conducted.

=== Uttar Pradesh ===
In October 2019, UP's Director general of police who cited "very important" concerns for the state's internal security, instructed all district police chiefs, IG, DIG range and ADG zone to commence a statewide campaign to start Identifying illegal Bangladeshi and foreigners. UP DGP Headquarters has prepared for an NRC for UP requires identification of new settlements around the railway stations, bus stands, roadsides and slum clusters where Bangladeshi and other foreign nationals could be illegally residing. They will be fingerprinted, and their identity verification will be video recorded, and suspicious people will be verified in a time-bound manner. Police will also track down government employees and touts who prepared fake documents for these illegal migrants.

Illegal Bangladeshi and Rohingyas are found in several cities of Uttar Pradesh (UP) by changing their identity and name, making it difficult to get an idea of their background. A large number of illegal Bangladeshis resided under a fake identity in ashrams and rented houses in Mathura, Vrindavan, Govardhan and other places for several years without a passport or other valid documents. They illegally crossed the border into India, acquire the fake identity, open bank accounts and used to send money from relatives back in their country. In October 2019, cops held 150 illegal Bangladeshi intruders who admitted to having come from Bangladesh by the river. All of them had acquired an Aadhar card, bank passbook, ration card and voter ID cards from India. They pose significant security and terrorism, law and order risk, due to religious activities in the Mathura area. They prefer Mathura as it is easier to hide among the transient pilgrims, and also because Mathura is on the border of Delhi, Haryana and Rajasthan where they can easily escape.

=== West Bengal ===
The other Indian state affected by this problem, West Bengal, remained mostly calm during this period. However Indian newspapers reported that "the state government has reported that illegal Bangladeshi migrants have trickled into parts of rural Bengal, including Nandigram, over the years, and settled down as sharecroppers with the help of local Left leaders. Though a majority of these immigrants became tillers, they lacked documents to prove the ownership of land.

The Government of Bangladesh has denied India's claims on illegal immigration.

After the 2001 census, the anxiety somewhat reduced when the growth rates were found to have returned to near-normal levels, particularly in West Bengal, thus negating the fear that there was an unabated influx of migrants, although some concern remains.

The proportion of Muslims in West Bengal has grown from 19.85% in 1951 to 27.01% in 2011. That, of course, does not have any reflection on immigration, it is generally attributed to a higher growth rate amongst the Muslims. However, when one has a closer look at the CD Blocks along the India-Bangladesh border questions come up. The exceedingly high decadal population growth rate in certain CD Blocks, such as in Basirhat subdivision in North 24 Parganas district and CD Blocks along with the riverine international border in Murshidabad district does raise concerns.

The decadal growth rate of the population for West Bengal in 2001–11 was 13.93%. The decadal growth of population in Basirhat I CD Block in 2001–2011 was 16.16%. The decadal growth of population in Basirhat I CD Block in 1991–2001 was 20.94%. The decadal growth of population in Hasnabad CD Block in 2001–2011 was 14.50%. The decadal growth of the population in Hasnabad CD Block in 1991–2001 was 17.47%. The decadal growth rate of population in neighbouring Satkhira District in Bangladesh was 6.50% for the decade 2001–2011, down from 16.75% in the decade 1991–2001 and 17.90% in the decade 1981–1991.

The decadal growth rates, for the decade 2001–2011, were still higher in the border areas of Murshidabad district. In Raghunathganj II CD Block it was 37.82%, the highest amongst all the CD Blocks in the Murshidabad district, 34.09% in Samserganj CD Block, 30.82 in Suti II CD Block, 29.02% in Suti I CD Block, 23.62% in Lalgola CD Block, 22.24% In Bhagawangola II CD Block and 21.65% in Bhagawangola I CD Block. The decadal growth rate of population in Chapai Nawabganj District was 15.59% for the decade 2001–2011, down from 21.67% in the decade 1991–2001. The decadal growth rate of the population in the Rajshahi District was 13.48% for the decade 2001–2011, down from 21.19% in the decade 1991–2001. Both districts are across the Ganges, in Bangladesh.

== See also ==
- Immigration to India
- Refugees in India
- Detention centres in Assam
- Citizenship (Amendment) Act, 2019
- The Foreigners Act, 1946
- Indian nationality law
- Bangladeshis in India
- East Bengali refugees
- Bangladesh–India border
- List of detention sites in the United States
- List of Australian immigration detention facilities
- National Register of Citizens
- National Register of Citizens for Assam
- Illegal Migrants (Determination by Tribunals) Act, 1983
- Deportation of Indian nationals under Donald Trump
