= Indian Identity Certificate =

Travel document

- Type: Travel document
- Issued by: India
- Purpose: Identification
- Eligibility: Non Indian citizens
- Expiration: 10 years after acquisition for those aged 18 or more; otherwise 5 years

An Indian Identity Certificate, simply known as Identity Certificate (IC), is a travel document issued by the Passport Seva (Passport Service), Consular, Passport & Visa (CPV) Division of the Ministry of External Affairs, Government of India to non-citizens of the Republic of India for foreign travel. It enables the bearer to travel internationally and serves as proof of identity as per the Passports Act (1967). It is mostly issued to Tibetan refugees, along with other stateless people. Since 28 June 2016, Sweden is no longer accepting the Indian Identity Certificate as a travel document. However, on 9 October 2018, Sweden started accepting the Indian Identify Certificate for Tibetan Refugees on the condition that they have no objection to returning to India.

== Application ==
Applications for an IC can be made to a Passport Seva office.

There are two cases where it is generally issued:

- At the behest of the Dalai Lama for Tibetan refugees,
- To other stateless people.

IC issuance is subject to clearance by CPV. In addition, clearance by State Government (Department of Home Affairs / Police) / Foreigner Regional Registration Office (FRRO) is also required for grant of a "No Objection to Return to India" (NORI) to be stamped on the Identity Certificate.

== Physical appearance ==
Indian Identity Certificates have a yellow cover with golden colored printing. The Emblem of India is emblazoned in the centre of the front cover. The words 'Identity Certificate' (English) are inscribed above the Emblem whereas 'भारत गणराज्य' (Hindi) and 'Republic of India' (English) are inscribed below the emblem. The standard book contains 36 pages.

=== Identity certificate note ===
This certificate is issued for the sole purpose of providing the holder with identity papers in lieu of a national passport. It is without prejudice to and in no way affects the national status of the holder. If the holder obtains any other travel document, this certificate ceases to be valid and must be surrendered to the nearest indian passport issuing authority This certificate is valid for travel to all countries.

The note bearing page is typically stamped and signed by the issuing authority.

== See also ==
- Refugees in India
- The Passports Act
