= Detention centres in Assam =

India's first and largest detention center for illegal immigrants

Assam Detention Camp is a group of immigration detention centers for illegal immigrants located in Assam. The first detention centre in the state had come up in 2008 under orders of the Gauhati High Court. Currently six immigration detention centres have been set up in Assam, all inside jails, in various districts of the state.

A total of ten centres are planned to be built in Assam. There are many in-construction or proposed detention centres to be constructed following the exclusion of people from the final National Register of Citizens of India. In 2014, the Centre had told all the states to set up at least one detention centre for illegal immigrants so as not to mix them up with jail inmates. According to a ruling by the Supreme Court, illegal immigrants can be held for three years at such facilities, after which they are eligible for bail.

The detention centers are commissioned as a place to house erstwhile residents who were excluded in NRC and finally declared illegal immigrants by the foreign tribunals of Assam. More than 19 lakh people have not been included into the list of citizens created to identify the illegal immigrants in Assam. These people need to prove their citizenship failing which they may be moved to these centres.

== History ==
The first detention centre in Assam had come up in 2008 under orders of the Gauhati High Court. They were first intended as a location for "short-term detention of undocumented immigrants, refugees and people awaiting trial before a Foreigner’s Tribunals". But now they are "synonymous with endless captivity." In 2011 the Assam government, when Congress was in power both at the Centre and in the state, had set up three detention camps (Note: Goalpara, Kokrajhar and Silchar) with hundreds of illegal immigrants. In 2018, Rs 46 crore was sanctioned for a detention camp by the Narendra Modi government.

== Detainees ==
On 27 November 2019, the Government disclosed that 1043 people were housed in six detention centres in Assam. The existing centres are currently being run from the district jail premises at Dibrugarh, Silchar, Tezpur, Jorhat, Kokrajhar (Note: 142 detainees including 14 minors are kept in the Kokrajhar detention center as of November 2019.) and Goalpara in Assam. On 17 November, The New York Times reported that the government had arrested several hundred people due to the suspicion of them being foreigners. A veteran of the Indian Army was also among those arrested.

=== Deaths ===
Trinamul MP Santanu Sen had asked the government in Rajya Sabha on what steps the government had taken to stop the deaths in the detention camps alleging that "most of the persons who died, they died out of apprehension". Responding to the question, minister of state for home, Nityanand Rai stated that so far, until November 2019, 28 people have died due to illness and not due to pressure.

== Matia (Goalpara) Detention Centre ==
Goalpara Detention Centre is located in Matia, Goalpara district, Assam. It is India's first (and largest) detention center for illegal immigrants. The detention center covers approximately 2,88,000 square feet (about the size of seven football grounds). It includes a school, recreational area and hospital. It is planned to have fifteen stories. The centre has been sanctioned by the Union Home Ministry in June 2018, which is funding the entire project. The detention centre is planned to be ready by December 2019. Two boundary walls painted in red colour encircle the camp. The outer wall will be at 20 feet and inner wall at six feet. Watchtowers are also a part of the structure.

== See also ==
- Immigration detention
- List of detention sites in the United States
- List of Australian immigration detention facilities
