= Citizenship (Amendment) Act, 2019 =

Law regarding citizenship rights for migrants to India

Parliament of India
- Long title: An Act further to amend the Citizenship Act, 1955.
- Citation: Act No. 47 of 2019
- Passed by: Lok Sabha
- Passed: 10 December 2019
- Passed by: Rajya Sabha
- Passed: 11 December 2019
- Assented to: 12 December 2019
- Signed by: Ram Nath Kovind, President of India
- Signed: 12 December 2019
- Effective: 10 January 2020; 6 years ago

Codification
- Code sections created: 11 March 2024

Legislative history

Initiating chamber: Lok Sabha
- Bill title: Citizenship (Amendment) Bill, 2019
- Bill citation: Bill No. 370 of 2019
- Introduced by: Amit Shah, Minister of Home Affairs
- Introduced: 9 December 2019; 6 years ago
- First reading: 9 December 2019
- Second reading: 10 December 2019
- Third reading: 11 December 2019

Amends
- Citizenship Act, 1955
- Status: In force

The Citizenship (Amendment) Act, 2019 (CAA) was passed by the Parliament of India on 11 December 2019. It amended the Citizenship Act, 1955 by providing an accelerated pathway to Indian citizenship for persecuted refugees of religious minorities from Afghanistan, Bangladesh and Pakistan who arrived in India by 2014. The eligible minorities were stated as Hindus, Sikhs, Buddhists, Jains, Parsis, and Christians. The law does not grant such eligibility to Muslims from these countries, as the Indian government argued that Muslims are unlikely to face religious persecution in Islamic countries. Additionally, the act excludes 58,000 Sri Lankan Tamil refugees, who have lived in India since the 1980s. The act was the first time that religion had been overtly used as a criterion for citizenship under Indian law, and it attracted global criticism. (Note: Sharma (2019), p. 523: "First, citizenship status biased towards religious identity is by no means a new idea.... A careful study of the policies and laws related to citizenship, adopted since independence, substantiates the assertion that citizenship in India has always been based on an implicit belief that India is for Hindus.") (Note: Sen (2018), pp. 10–11: "Nehru's response [to Patel's warning] made it clear that Muslim migrants from Pakistan could not join the ranks of refugees in India... Thus, despite broad public statements promising citizenship to all displaced persons from Pakistan, Hindu migrants alone counted as citizen-refugees in post-partition India.") (Note: Jayal (2019), pp. 34–35: "While some elements of religious difference had... been covertly smuggled in earlier, this bill seeks to do so overtly.")

The Bharatiya Janata Party (BJP), which led the Indian government in 2019, had promised in previous election manifestos to offer Indian citizenship to members of persecuted religious minorities who had migrated from neighbouring Muslim-majority countries. Under the 2019 amendment, migrants who had entered India by 31 December 2014, and had suffered "religious persecution or fear of religious persecution" in their country of origin, were made eligible for accelerated citizenship. The amendment lowered the residence requirement for naturalisation of these migrants from twelve years to six. According to Intelligence Bureau records, there will be just over 30,000 immediate beneficiaries of the act. (Note: According to the Indian Intelligence Bureau figures given to the Joint Parliamentary Committee, 31,313 people were granted long-term visas using the criteria mentioned in the Act. They included 25,447 Hindus, 5,807 Sikhs, 55 Christians, 2 Buddhists and 2 Parsis. They were expected to be the immediate beneficiaries of the Act.)

The amendment was considered controversial with allegations of discrimination based on religion, particularly for the exclusion of Muslims, from the neighbouring countries. The BJP-led government said that since Pakistan, Afghanistan and Bangladesh have Islam as their state religion, it is therefore "unlikely" that Muslims would "face religious persecution" there. However, certain Muslim groups, such as Hazaras (mostly Shias) and Ahmadis, have historically faced persecution in these countries. Critics expressed concerns that the bill may be used, along with the National Register of Citizens (NRC), to render many Muslim citizens stateless, as they may be unable to meet stringent birth or identity proof requirements. Commentators also question the exclusion of persecuted religious minorities from other regions such as Tibet, Sri Lanka and Myanmar.

The passage of the legislation caused large-scale protests in India. Assam and other northeastern states witnessed violent demonstrations against the bill over fears that granting Indian citizenship to refugees and immigrants will cause a loss of their "political rights, culture and land rights" and motivate further migration from Bangladesh. In other parts of India, protesters said that the bill discriminated against Muslims, and demanded that Indian citizenship be granted to Muslim refugees and immigrants as well. Major protests against the Act were held at some universities in India. Students at Aligarh Muslim University and Jamia Millia Islamia faced brutal suppression by the police. The protests led to the deaths of several protesters, injuries to both protesters and police officers, and damage to public and private property. Some states announced that they would not implement the Act. In response, the Central Home Ministry said that states lack the legal power to stop the implementation of the CAA.

On 11 March 2024, the Ministry of Home Affairs officially announced the rules for the Citizenship Amendment Act, following Home Minister Amit Shah's announcement to notify them before the 2024 national elections. Subsequently, on 15 May 2024, the first set of 14 migrants received "Indian citizenship" certificates under the CAA in Delhi, initiating the process of granting nationality to migrant applicants, nearly two months after the notification of CAA rules. On the same day, over 350 migrants received Indian nationality digitally, under CAA, in other parts of the country. After getting Indian citizenship, many Hindu refugees from Pakistan expressed hope for a better future in India.

== Background ==
=== Citizenship law ===
The Indian Constitution implemented in 1950 guaranteed citizenship to all of the country's residents at the commencement of the constitution, and made no distinction on the basis of religion. In 1955, the Indian government passed the Citizenship Act, by which all people born in India subject to some limitations were accorded citizenship. The Act also provided two means for foreigners to acquire Indian citizenship. People from "undivided India" (Note: The Act defines "undivided India" as "India as defined in the Government of India Act, 1935, as originally enacted". It included, in addition to India, the present day Pakistan and Bangladesh.) were given a means of registration after seven years of residency in India. Those from other countries were given a means of naturalisation after twelve years of residency in India. Political developments in the 1980s, particularly those related to the violent Assam movement against migrants from Bangladesh, triggered revisions to the Citizenship Act. The Act was first amended in 1985 after the Assam Accord signed by Rajiv Gandhi government, granting citizenship to all Bangladeshi migrants that arrived before 1971 subject to some provisos. The government also agreed to identify all migrants that arrived afterwards, remove their names from the electoral rolls, and expel them from the country.

The Citizenship Act was further amended in 1992, 2003, 2005 and 2015. In December 2003, the National Democratic Alliance government, led by the Bharatiya Janata Party (BJP), passed the Citizenship (Amendment) Act, 2003 with far-reaching revisions of the Citizenship Act. It added the notion of "illegal immigrants" to the Act, making them ineligible to apply for citizenship (by registration or naturalisation), and declaring their children also as illegal immigrants. Illegal immigrants were defined as citizens of other countries who entered India without valid travel documents, or who remained in the country beyond the period permitted by their travel documents. They can be deported or imprisoned.

The 2003 amendment also mandated the Government of India to create and maintain a National Register of Citizens. The bill was supported by the Indian National Congress, as well as the Left parties, such as the Communist Party of India (Marxist) (CPI (M)). (Note: In 2012, the then CPI(M) general secretary Prakash Karat had written to Manmohan Singh, who was prime minister at the time, reminding him of his 2003 statement and urging him to make a suitable amendment in policy to allow "minority community refugees" easy citizenship.) During the parliamentary debate on the amendment, the leader of opposition, Manmohan Singh, stated that refugees belonging to minority communities in Bangladesh and other countries had faced persecution, and requested a liberal approach to granting them citizenship. According to M.K. Venu, the formulation of the 2003 amendment discussed by Advani and Singh was based on the idea that Muslim groups in Pakistan and Afghanistan that had experienced persecution also needed to be treated with compassion.

=== Immigrants and refugees ===
A very large number of illegal immigrants, the largest numbers of whom are from Bangladesh, live in India. The Task Force on Border Management quoted the figure of 15 million illegal migrants in 2001. In 2004, the United Progressive Alliance (UPA) government stated in Parliament that there were 12 million illegal Bangladeshi migrants in India. The reasons for the scale of migration include a porous border, historical migration patterns, economic reasons, and cultural and linguistic ties. Many illegal migrants from Bangladesh had eventually received the right to vote. According to Niraja Jayal, this enfranchisement was widely described as an attempt to win elections using the votes of the illegal migrants from Bangladesh. Bangladeshi scholar Abul Barkat estimated that over 11 million Hindus have left Bangladesh for India between 1964 and 2013, at a rate of 230,612 annually. The reasons were religious persecution and discrimination, especially at the hands of the post-independence military regimes. An unknown number of Pakistani Hindu refugees also live in India. An estimated 5,000 refugees arrive per year, citing religious persecution and forced conversion.

India is not a signatory to either the 1951 UN Refugee Convention or the 1967 Protocol. It does not have a national policy on refugees. All refugees are classed as "illegal migrants". While India has been willing to host refugees, its traditional position formulated by Jawaharlal Nehru is that such refugees must return to their home countries after the situation returns to normal. According to the US Committee for Refugees and Immigrants, India hosts refugees in excess of 456,000, with about 200,000 from "non-neighbouring" countries hosted via the UNHCR. (Note: Indian government statistics in 2014 show 289,394 "stateless persons" in India. The majority were from Bangladesh and Sri Lanka (about 100,000 each), followed by those from Tibet, Myanmar, Pakistan and Afghanistan.) According to Shuvro Sarker, since the 1950s and particularly since the 1990s, the Indian governments under various political parties have studied and drafted laws for the naturalisation of refugees and asylum seekers. These drafts have struggled with issues relating to a mass influx of refugees, urban planning, cost of basic services, the obligations to protected tribes, and the impact on pre-existing regional poverty levels within India.

=== Bharatiya Janata Party activities ===
The "detection, deletion and deportation" of illegal migrants has been on the agenda of the BJP since 1996. In the 2016 assembly elections for the border state of Assam, the BJP leaders campaigned in the state promising voters that they would rid Assam of the Bangladeshis. Simultaneously, they also promised to protect Hindus who had fled religious persecution in Bangladesh. According to commentators, in the context of an effort to identify and deport illegal immigrants, the proposal to grant citizenship took a new meaning. Illegal migrants could be granted citizenship if they were non-Muslim, on the grounds that they were refugees; only Muslims would be deported.

In its manifesto for the 2014 Indian general election, the BJP promised to provide a "natural home" for persecuted Hindu refugees. The year before the 2016 elections in Assam, the government legalised refugees belonging to religious minorities from Pakistan and Bangladesh, granting them long-term visas. Bangladeshi and Pakistani nationals belonging to "minority communities" were exempted from the requirements of the Passport (Entry into India) Act, 1920 and the Foreigners Act, 1946. Specifically mentioned were "Hindus, Sikhs, Christians, Jains, Parsis and Buddhists," who had been "compelled to seek shelter in India due to religious persecution or fear of religious persecution". Eligibility for the exemption was made contingent on a migrant having arrived in India by 31 December 2014.

The BJP government introduced a bill to amend the citizenship law in 2016, which would have made non-Muslim migrants from Pakistan, Afghanistan, and Bangladesh eligible for Indian citizenship. The bill stalled in parliament following widespread political opposition and protests in northeast India. Opponents of the bill in Assam and the northeastern states of India stated that any migration from Bangladesh "irrespective of religion" would cause "loss of political rights and culture of the indigenous people". According to Niraja Jayal, while the BJP had promised to grant Indian citizenship to all Hindu migrants from Bangladesh in its election campaigns during the 2010s, the draft Amendment bill angered many in Assam, including its own political allies because they viewed the amendment as a violation of the Assam Accord. That accord promised to identify and deport all illegal Bangladeshi migrants who entered the state after 1971, "regardless of their religious identity". In 2018, as the draft of this Amendment was being discussed, numerous Assamese organisations petitioned and agitated against it. They fear that the Amendment will encourage more migration and diminish employment opportunities to the native residents in the state.

In parallel to the drafting of an amendment to the 1955 Citizenship Act, the BJP government completed an effort to update the National Register of Citizens (NRC) in the state of Assam. The process for creating the NRC had been put in place by the Citizenship rules enacted in 2003, and had been implemented in Assam under Supreme Court supervision as a result of a 2014 Supreme Court ruling. This was mandated under prior peace agreements in northeast, and the Assam Accord in particular. The updated register was made public in August 2019; approximately 1.9 million residents were not on the list, and were in danger of losing their citizenship. Many of those affected were Bengali Hindus, who constitute a major voter base for the BJP; according to commentators, the BJP withdrew its support for the Assam NRC towards its end for this reason. (Note: The excluded people of the Assam NRC were 0.5 million Bengali Hindus and 0.7 million Muslims, with the remainder made up of local people and Hindus from north India.) On 19 November 2019, Home Minister Amit Shah, declared in the Rajya Sabha (the Upper House of the Indian parliament) that the National Register of Citizens would be implemented throughout the country.

== Legislative history ==
The BJP government first introduced a bill to amend the citizenship law in 2016, which would have made non-Muslim migrants from Pakistan, Afghanistan, and Bangladesh eligible for Indian citizenship. Although this bill was passed by the Lok Sabha, or lower house of Indian parliament, it stalled in the Rajya Sabha, following widespread political opposition and protests in northeast India.

The BJP reiterated its commitment to amend the citizenship act in its 2019 election campaign. It stated that religious minorities such as Hindus and Sikhs are persecuted in neighbouring Muslim-majority countries, and promised to fast track a path to citizenship for non-Muslim refugees. After the elections, the BJP government drafted a bill that addressed the concerns of its northeastern states. It excluded Arunachal Pradesh, Mizoram, Nagaland, Tripura, Meghalaya and Manipur, except for non-tribal cities exempted under pre-existing regulations. It also excluded tribal areas of Assam. The Indian government, while proposing an Amendment, said, that its bill aims to grant quicker access to citizenship to those who have fled religious persecution in neighbouring countries and have taken refuge in India.

The Bill was introduced in Lok Sabha on 19 July 2016 as the Citizenship (Amendment) Bill, 2016. It was referred to the Joint parliamentary committee on 12 August 2016. The Committee submitted its report on 7 January 2019 to Parliament. The Bill was taken into consideration and passed by Lok Sabha on 8 January 2019. It was pending for consideration and passing by the Rajya Sabha. Consequent to dissolution of 16th Lok Sabha, this Bill has lapsed.

After the formation of 17th Lok Sabha, the Central Cabinet cleared the Citizenship (Amendment) Bill, 2019, on 4 December 2019 for introduction in the parliament. The Bill was introduced in 17th Lok Sabha by the Minister of Home Affairs Amit Shah on 9 December 2019 and was passed on the midnight of 10 December 2019 despite attempts by the opposition to filibuster the bill, with 311 MPs voting in favour and 80 against it.

The bill was passed by the Rajya Sabha on 11 December 2019 with 125 votes in favour and 105 votes against it. The parties that voted in favour in spite of not being in the ruling coalition included JD(U), AIADMK, BJD, TDP and YSRCP.

After receiving assent from the President of India on 12 December 2019, the bill assumed the status of an act. The act came into force on 10 January 2020. The implementation of the CAA began on 20 December 2019, when Central Minister Mansukh Mandaviya gave citizenship certificates to seven refugees from Pakistan.

== The Amendments ==
The Citizenship (Amendment) Act of 2019 amended the Citizenship Act, 1955, by inserting the following provisos in section 2, sub-section (1), after clause (b):

Provided that any person belonging to Hindu, Sikh, Buddhist, Jain, Parsi or Christian community from Afghanistan, Bangladesh or Pakistan, who entered into India on or before the 31st day of December, 2014 and who has been exempted by the Central Government by or under clause (c) of sub-section (2) of section 3 of the Passport (Entry into India) Act, 1920 or from the application of the provisions of the Foreigners Act, 1946 or any rule or order made thereunder, shall not be treated as illegal migrant for the purposes of this Act;

A new section 6B was inserted (in the section concerning naturalisation), with four clauses, the first of which stated:

(1) The Central Government or an authority specified by it in this behalf may, subject to such conditions, restrictions and manner as may be prescribed, on an application made in this behalf, grant a certificate of registration or certificate of naturalisation to a person referred to in the proviso to clause (b) of sub-section (1) of section 2.

The "exempted" classes of persons were previously defined in the Foreigners (Amendment) Order, 2015 (issued under the Foreigners Act, 1946):

3A. Exemption of certain class of foreigners. – (1) Persons belonging to minority communities in Bangladesh and Pakistan, namely, Hindus, Sikhs, Buddhists, Jains, Parsis and Christians who were compelled to seek shelter in India due to religious persecution or fear of religious persecution and entered into India on or before 31 December 2014

(a) without valid documents including passport or other travel documents and who have been exempted under rule 4 from the provisions of rule 3 of the Passport (Entry into India) Rules, 1950 [...]; or
(b) with valid documents including passport or other travel document and the validity of any of such documents has expired,

are hereby granted exemption from the application of provisions of the Foreigners Act, 1946, and the orders made thereunder in respect of their stay in India without such documents or after the expiry of those documents, as the case may be [...].

The Rules had been further amended in 2016 by adding Afghanistan to the list of countries.

Exemptions were granted to northeastern regions of India in the clause (4) of section 6B:

(4) Nothing in this section shall apply to tribal area of Assam, Meghalaya, Mizoram or Tripura as included in the Sixth Schedule to the Constitution and the area covered under "The Inner Line" notified under the Bengal Eastern Frontier Regulation, 1873.

== Analysis ==
The Act amended the Citizenship Act, 1955 to give accelerated eligibility for Indian citizenship to persecuted minorities who are Hindus, Sikhs, Buddhists, Jains, Parsis and Christians from Afghanistan, Bangladesh and Pakistan, and who entered India on or before 31 December 2014. The Act does not include Muslims. Under the original citizenship act, one of the requirements for citizenship by naturalisation is that the applicant must have lived in India during the last 12 months, and for 11 of the previous 14 years. The amendment relaxes this 11-year requirement to 5 years for persons belonging to the same six religions and three countries.

The immediate beneficiaries of the Amended Act will be 31,313 people of India, which include 25,447 Hindus, 5,807 Sikhs, 55 Christians, 2 Buddhists and 2 Parsis. In Assam, about 3-6 lakh people are expected to be benefited under this act. In West Bengal, the Matua community (Bengali Hindu Dalits i.e. SCs of East Bengal of Pakistan), numbering 3 crores (approx 30% population of West Bengal), is mostly concentrated in districts such as North 24 Parganas, Nadia, Hooghly, Cooch Behar, South Dinajpur, East Burdwan, and other parts of West Bengal. The community, having immigrated during the Partition of India and Partition of Bengal in 1947 and later during the 1971 Bangladesh (East Bengal or East Pakistan) Liberation War (Civil War in Pakistan), out of which about 1.5 crore Matuas came to West Bengal after the creation of Bangladesh in 1971 (after 24 March), have long been demanding the implementation of the Act due to facing citizenship issues for a considerable period. However, the Government of India says that it does not maintain records of CAA applicants as there is no such provision for record-keeping, thus making it difficult to ascertain the numbers of absolute beneficiaries of the Act.

The amendment exempts the tribal areas of Assam, Meghalaya, and Tripura from its applicability. It also exempts the areas regulated through the Inner Line Permit, which include Arunachal Pradesh, Mizoram, Nagaland and Manipur, the last of which was brought under Inner Line Permit on 9 December 2019.

The amendment includes a new provision for cancellation of the registration of Overseas Citizenship of India (OCI) if there are any violations of any law of India, whether they are petty infractions or heinous felonies, however it also adds the opportunity for the OCI holder to be heard before the verdict.

=== Exclusion of persecuted Muslims ===
Muslims from Pakistan, Bangladesh and Afghanistan are not offered accelerated eligibility for citizenship under the new Act. Critics have questioned the exclusion on account of anti-Islamic sentiment. The amendment limits itself to the Muslim-majority neighbours of India and takes no cognisance of the Muslims of those countries. Pakistan, Afghanistan, and Bangladesh are Muslim-majority countries that have modified their constitutions in recent decades to declare Islam their official state religion. Therefore, according to the Indian government, Muslims in these Islamic countries are "unlikely to face religious persecution". The government says that Muslims cannot be "treated as persecuted minorities" in these Muslim-majority countries. The BBC says that while these countries have provisions in their constitution guaranteeing non-Muslims rights, including the freedom to practice their religion, in practice non-Muslim populations have experienced discrimination and persecution.

The Economist criticised the exclusion by arguing that the Indian government's concern for religious persecution should have been extended to Ahmadiyyas – a Muslim sect who have been "viciously hounded in Pakistan as heretics", and the Hazaras – another Muslim sect who have been murdered by the Taliban in Afghanistan. The Economist argued that they should be treated as persecuted minorities as well.

=== Exclusion of other persecuted communities ===
The Act does not include migrants from non-Muslim countries fleeing persecution to India, including Hindu refugees from Sri Lanka and Buddhist refugees from Tibet.

The Act does not mention Tamil refugees from Sri Lanka. The Sri Lankan Tamils were allowed to settle as refugees in Tamil Nadu in 1980s and 1990s due to systemic violence from the Sinhalese of Sri Lanka. They include 29,500 "hill country Tamils" (Malaiha).

The Act does not provide relief to Tibetan Buddhist refugees, who came to India in the 1950s and 1960s due to the Chinese invasion of Tibet. Their status has been of refugees over the decades. According to a 1992 UNHCR report, the then Indian government stated that they remain refugees and do not have the right to acquire Indian nationality.

The Act does not address Rohingya Muslim refugees from Myanmar. The Indian government has been deporting Rohingya refugees to Myanmar.

=== Relationship to NRC ===
The National Register of Citizens is a registry of all legal citizens, whose construction and maintenance was mandated by the 2003 amendment of the Citizenship Act. As of January 2020, it has only been implemented for the state of Assam, but the BJP has promised its implementation for the whole of India in its 2019 election manifesto. The NRC documents all the legal citizens so that the people who are left out can be recognized as illegal immigrants (often called "foreigners"). The experience with Assam NRC shows that many people were declared "foreigners" because their documents were deemed insufficient.

In this context, there are concerns that the present amendment of the Citizenship Act provides a "shield" to the non-Muslims, who can claim that they were migrants who fled persecution from Afghanistan, Pakistan, or Bangladesh, while the Muslims do not have such a benefit. Such a claim may be possible only for people in the border states who have some ethnic resemblance to the people of Afghanistan, Pakistan or Bangladesh, but not to the people of interior states. Muslim leaders have interpreted the CAA–NRC package in precisely these terms, viz., that the Muslims in the country would be targeted (by considering documents as insufficient) as potential foreigners, leaving out all non-Muslims.

In an interview to India Today, Home Minister Amit Shah offered reassurance that no Indian citizen needs to worry. "We will make special provisions to ensure that no Indian citizen from minority communities is victimised in the NRC process." But the Indian Express said that the purpose of the NRC is precisely to identify the Indian citizens. So these references to "Indian citizens" remain unexplained.

== Reception ==
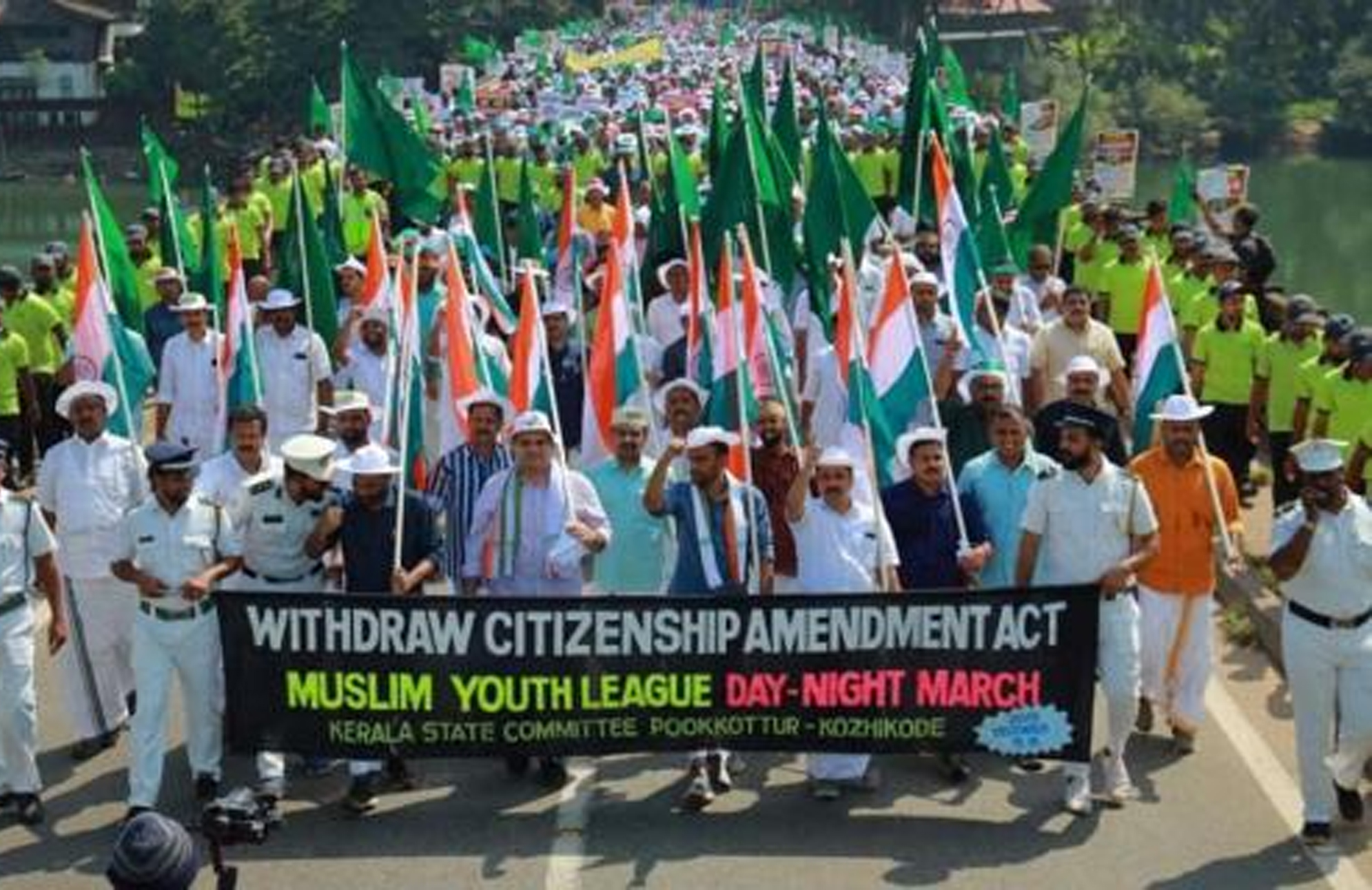
Citizenship Amendment Act protests in Calicut Kerala 2020 by Muslim Youth League (The Youth Wing of Indian Union Muslim League)

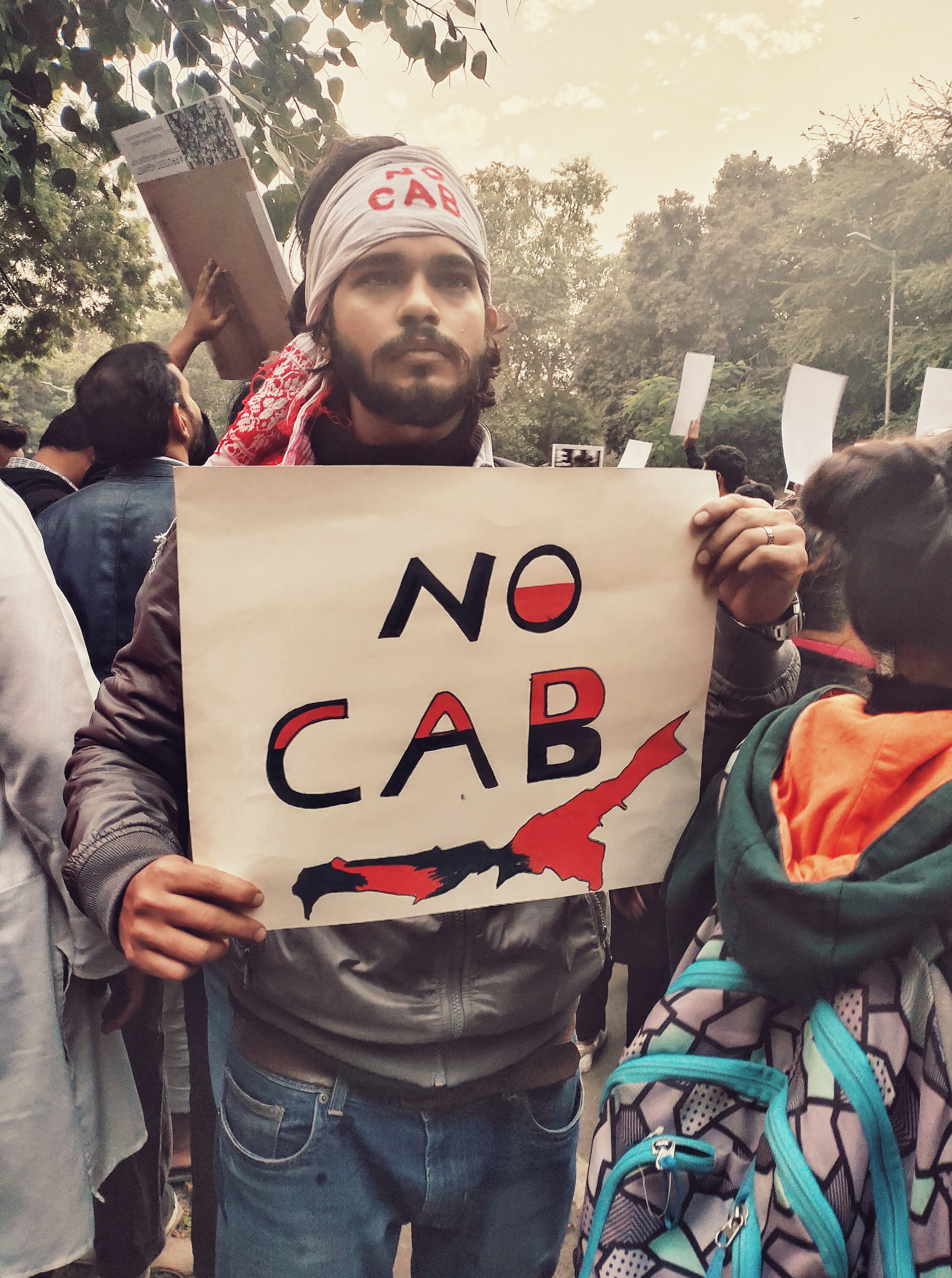
Locals protest against the CAB (Citizenship Amendment Bill) in New Delhi on 14 December 2019

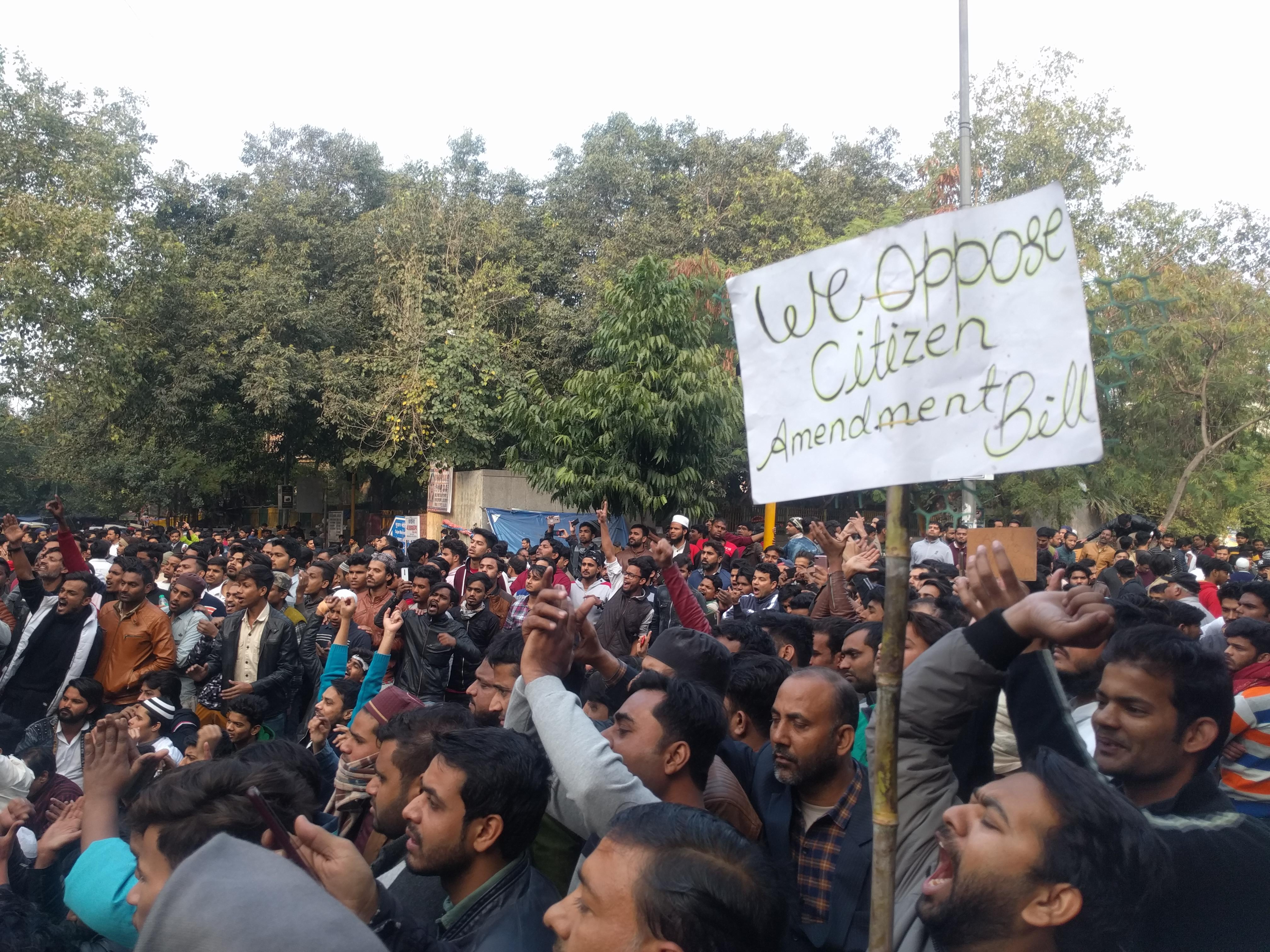
Locals and Jamia Millia Islamia students protest against CAA/NRC in New Delhi on 15 December 2019

=== Protests ===
The passage of the Act triggered different types of protests and criticisms. Violent protests erupted in Assam, where the protesters maintained that the new provisions of this Act are against prior agreements such as the Assam Accord, and that they would cause a "loss of political rights and culture". The India-Japan summit in Guwahati, which was supposed to be attended by Shinzō Abe was cancelled. The UK, USA, France, Israel and Canada issued travel warnings for people visiting India's north-east region, telling their citizens to "exercise caution".

In other parts of India, Islamic political and student activists along with a few others protested that the law "marginalizes Muslims, is prejudicial against Muslims" and sought that Muslim migrants and refugees should also be granted Indian citizenship per its secular foundations. The protesters demanded that the law should grant Indian citizenship to Muslim immigrants and refugees too.

Protests against the bill were held in several metropolitan cities across India, including Kolkata, Delhi, Mumbai, Bengaluru, Hyderabad, and Jaipur. Rallies were also held in various Indian states of West Bengal, Punjab, Uttar Pradesh, Karnataka, Tamil Nadu, Gujarat, Telangana, Bihar, Maharastra, Kerala and Karnataka. 27 people were killed by police firing guns in the whole of India. Along with in-person protests, the internet—especially on social media platforms such as Facebook and Twitter—was also the site of comment and debate regarding the constitutionality of the amendment. Large metropolitan areas (with Kolkata, Mumbai, and Bangalore standing out) became hotspots for online posts about the CAA. As with in-person protests, so also online opposition to the BJP and statements opposing Islamophobia came from people of all backgrounds and experiences. Overall, protesters framed the CAA as a continuation of a history of anti-Islamic legislation and propaganda by the BJP.

Various cities around the world, including New York, Washington D. C., Melbourne, Paris, Berlin, Geneva, Barcelona, San Francisco, Tokyo, Helsinki, and Amsterdam, witnessed protests against the Act and the police brutality faced by Indian protesters. This showed up especially in the United States, Middle East, and Europe on social media; for example, 13% of Twitter flow on the CAA came from these international locations. The bulk of the in-person and social media protest, however, was in India.

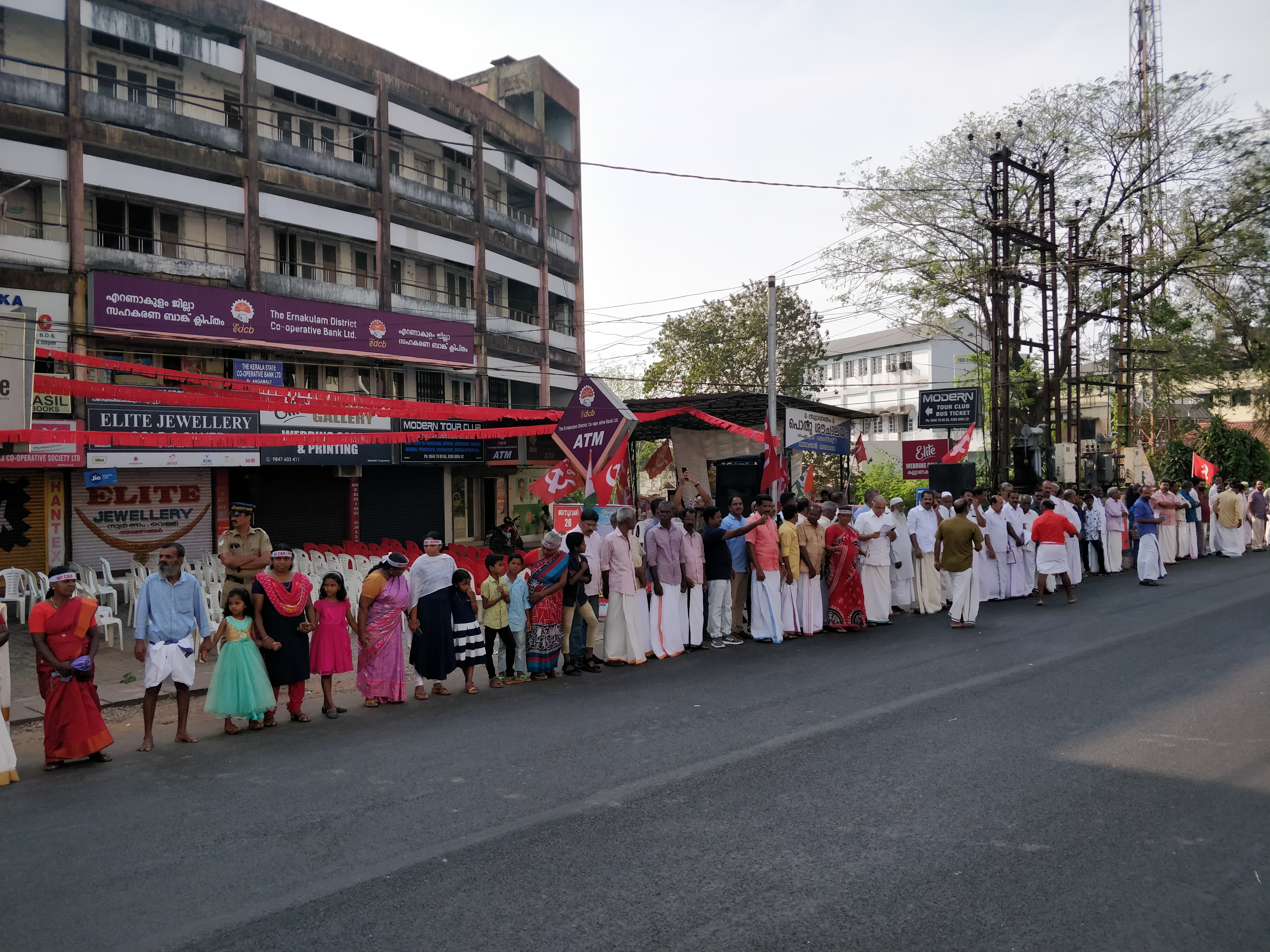
Kerala human chain was formed by approximately 6 to 7 million people and extended for a distance of 700 kilometres

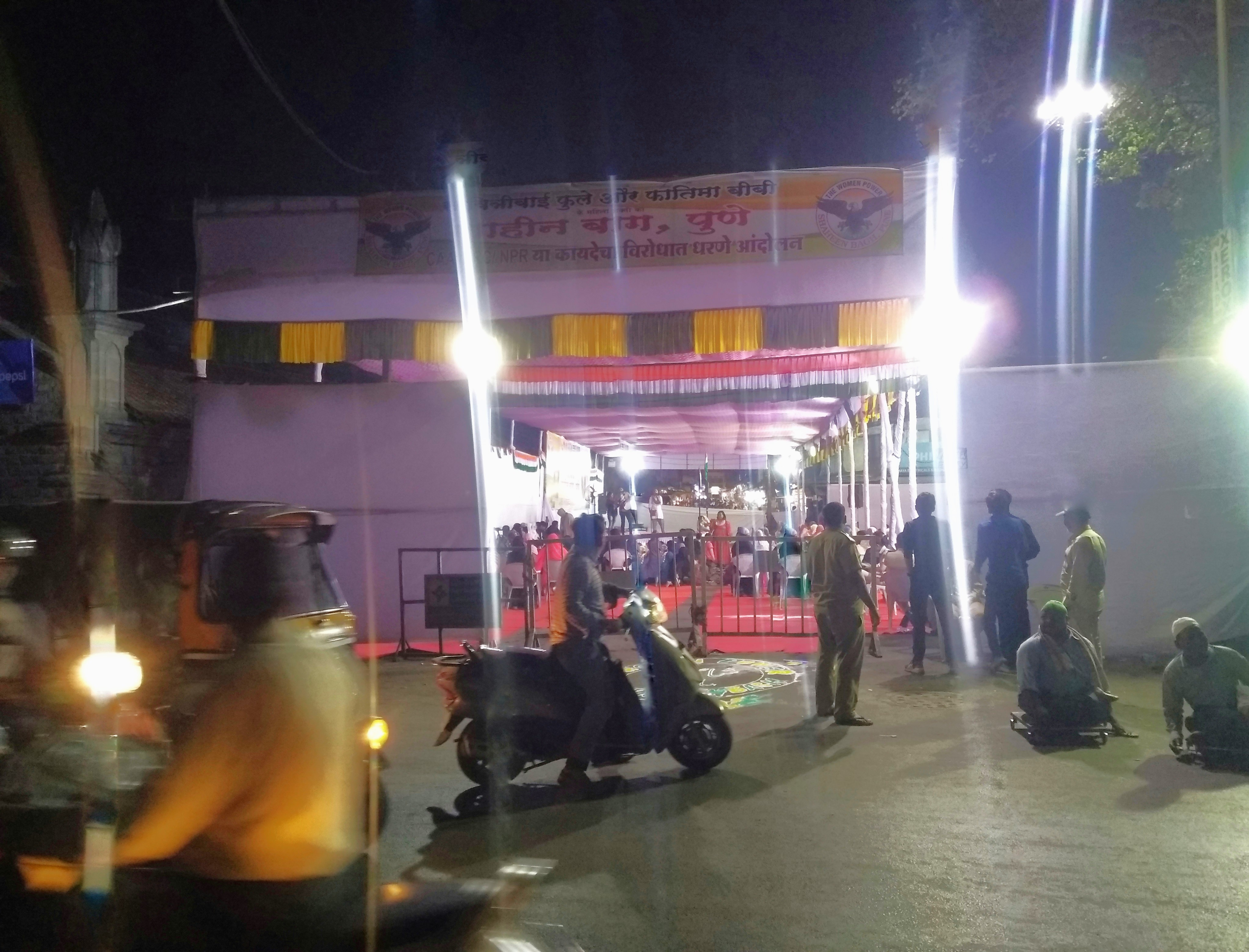
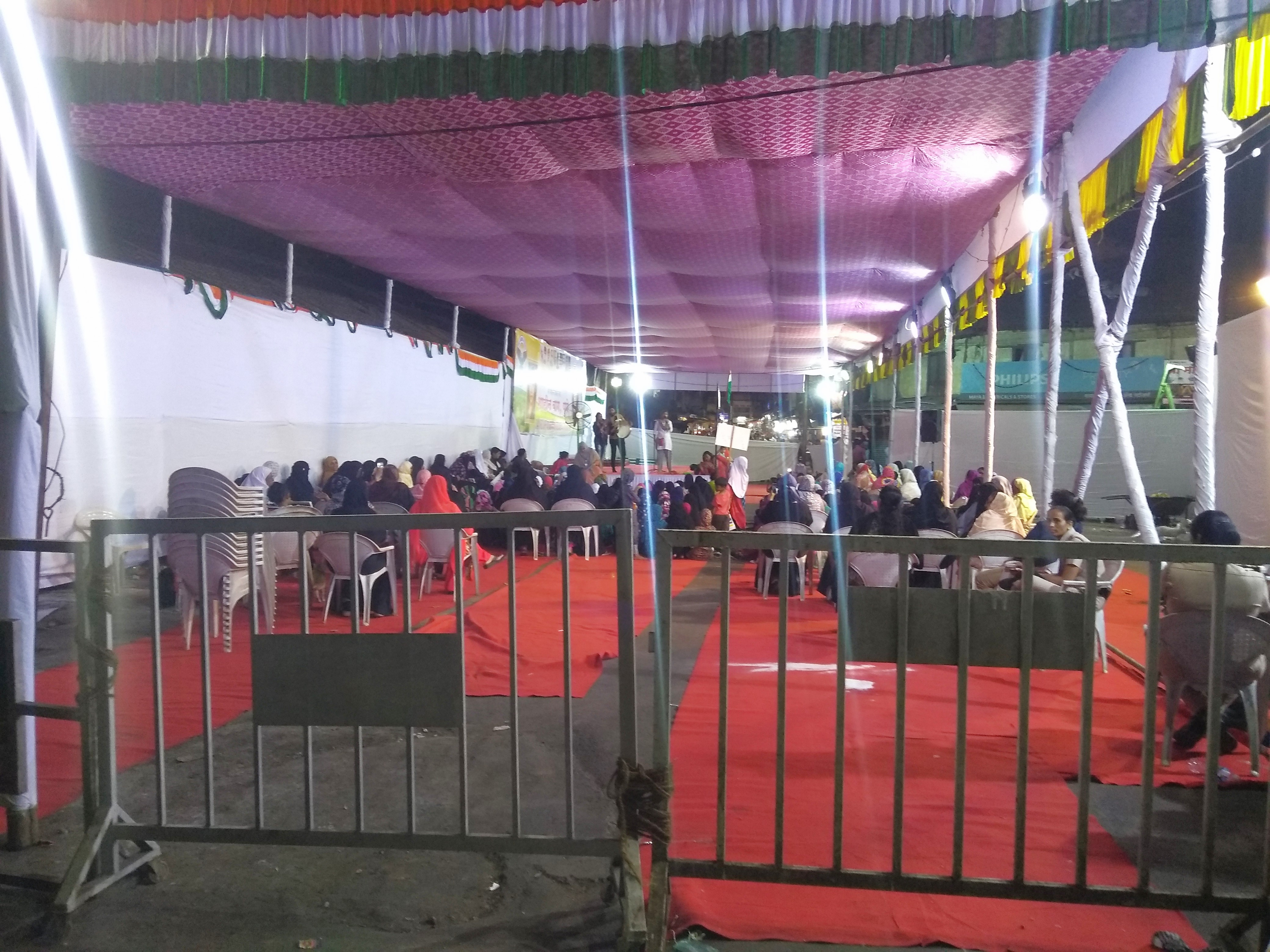
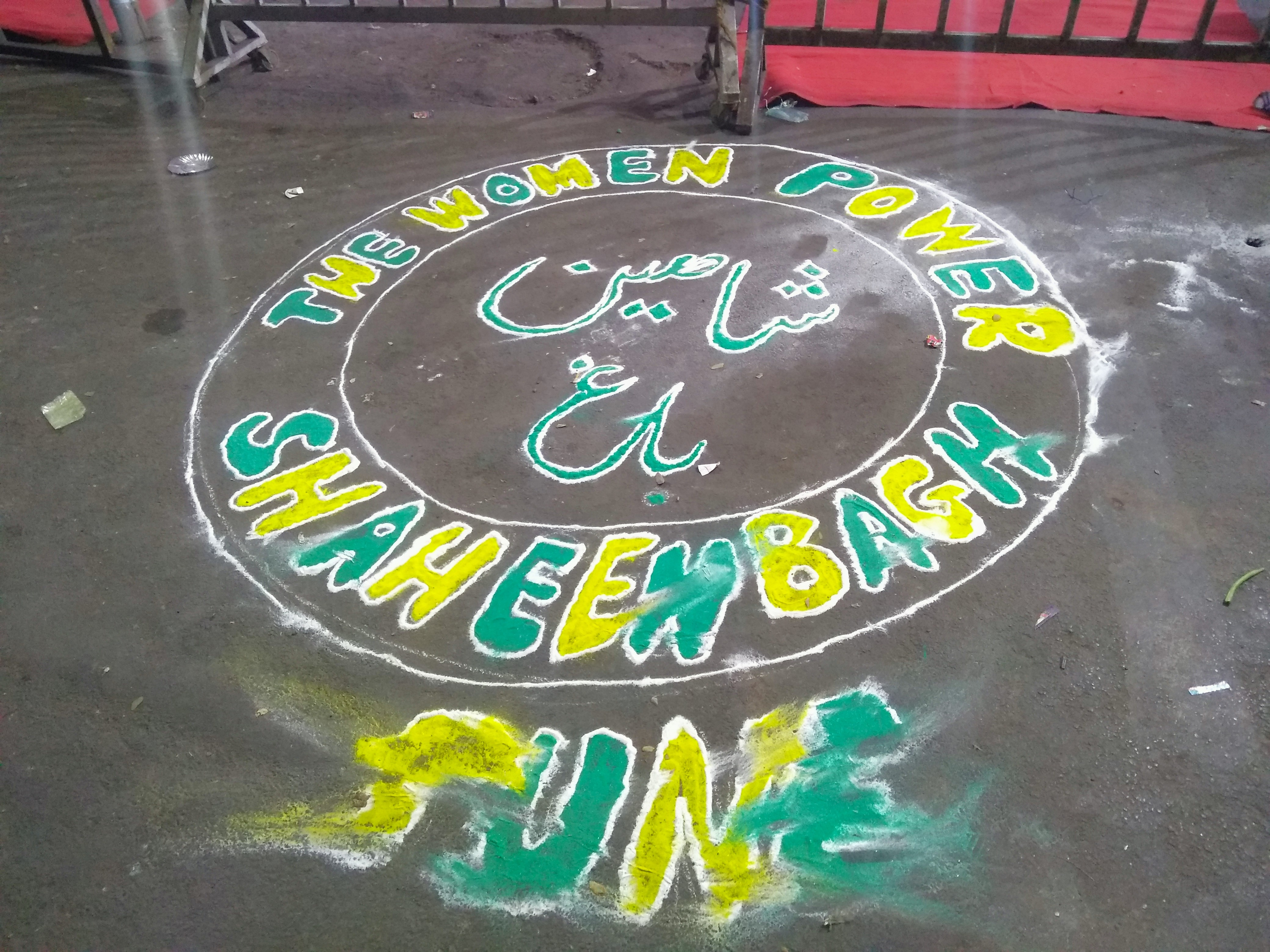
Shaheen Bagh protests against CAA, NRC and NPR in Pune on 22 Jan 2020

Students from various universities like Jamia Millia Islamia, Vishwa Bharati University, Aligarh Muslim University, Nadwa College, Jawaharlal Nehru University, IIT Kanpur, IIT Madras, Jadavpur University, Tata Institute of Social Sciences, IISc, Pondicherry University, and IIM Ahmedabad also held protest. More than 25 student associations from all over India joined protest. On 15 December, police forcefully entered the campus of Jamia Millia Islamia university, where protests were being held, and detained the students. Police used batons and tear gas on the students. More than a hundred students were injured and an equal number were detained. The police action was widely criticized, and resulted in protests across the country.

Muslims all over India came out to protest the CAA–NRC package with a renewed assertion of their identity as Indians. Muslim women started protest at Shaheen Bagh on 15 December 2019 start as an ongoing 24/7 sit-in peaceful protest. The protesters at Shaheen Bagh have blocked a major highway (Note: Road No 13-A, Shaheen Bagh (GD Birla Marg) – Mathura Road – Kalindi Kunj – Shaheen Bagh stretch is a border point that connects New Delhi to Noida and Faridabad.) in New Delhi using non-violent resistance for more than 51 days now as of 5 February 2020. On 24 February, violent clashes occurred during the North East Delhi riots in which seven people where killed and more than a hundred injured. The death toll rose to 42 within 36 hours, with 250 people getting injured.

=== Indian government response ===
On 16 December, after the protests entered the fifth day, Prime Minister Narendra Modi appealed for calm in a series of tweets saying "No Indian has anything to worry regarding this act. This act is only for those who have faced years of persecution outside and have no other place to go except India". As CAA protests raised concerns on combined effects of CAA with NRC, both the PM Narendra Modi and Home Minister Amit Shah stating that there has been no talk on pan-Indian NRC in their government for now, and neither the cabinet nor the legal department has discussed it.

Considering Violence and damage to public properties during demonstration, on 19 December, police banned protests in several parts of India with the imposition of section 144 which prohibits the gathering of more than 4 individuals in a public space as being unlawful, namely, parts of the capital Delhi, Uttar Pradesh, and Karnataka, including Bangalore. Police in Chennai denied permission for marches, rallies or any other demonstration. Internet services were shut down in several parts of Delhi. As a result of defining the ban, thousands of protesters were detained, including several opposition leaders and activists such as Ramachandra Guha, Sitaram Yechury, Yogendra Yadav, Umar Khalid, Sandeep Dikshit, Tehseen Poonawalla and D Raja.

=== Rallies in support ===
Right-wing student groups such as those from the Akhil Bharatiya Vidyarthi Parishad – a student wing of the Hindu nationalist Rashtriya Swayamsevak Sangh, held rallies in support of the amended Citizenship Act. Rallies in support of the Amendment Act were led by BJP leaders in West Bengal, who alleged that the state government blocked them. They also accused the Chief Minister Mamata Banerjee's party members of misinforming the state's residents about the new law. Similarly, some 15,000 people joined a BJP-organised rally in support of the Act in Rajasthan. On 20 December 2019, scores of people held demonstrations in Central Park, Connaught Place, New Delhi in support of the Act. Hundreds of people gathered in Pune, forming a human chain, in support of CAA, on 22 December. ABVP members held a rally in support of CAA and NRC in Kerala. Hundreds of citizens were out on the streets in support of the citizenship law in Bangalore. Jay Kholiya, ex-Member and Officer Bearer of ABVP Maharashtra had resigned from his office during these protests citing "Ideological Differences". In Assam, ABVP's National Executive Moon Talukdar also had joined Anti-CAA Protests. He also announced that around 800 members would resign in opposition to the government's move to implement the Citizenship (Amendment) Act (CAA).

=== Refugees ===
Hindu refugee families in Assam, living since the 1960s in a refugee camp and who had been denied Indian citizenship so far, said that the Amendment had "kindled hope" at first. They added that the recent protests against the Act and demands for its cancellation have made them fearful of the future. In New Delhi, about 600 refugees from Pakistan living in a camp consisting of tiny shanties celebrated the new law. A delegation of Sikh refugees who had arrived from Afghanistan three decades ago thanked the Indian government for amending the citizenship law. They stated the Amended law would allow them to finally gain Indian citizenship and "join the mainstream".

Some Rohingya Muslim refugees in India were not optimistic about the Amendment and feared they would be deported. Other Rohingya refugees expressed gratitude at having been allowed to stay in India, but did not make any comments specific to the Act lest they provoke a backlash. They said that local police had asked them not to protest against the Act.

More than 200 families have arrived in the Indian state of Punjab with all their belongings after the law was enacted.

=== Political and legal challenge ===
The bill was opposed by the Indian National Congress, who said it would create communal tensions and polarise India. The Chief Ministers of the Indian states of Madhya Pradesh, Chhattisgarh, West Bengal, Punjab, Kerala and Rajasthan and union territory of Puducherry – all led by non-BJP governments – said they will not implement the law. According to the Central Home Ministry, states lack the legal power to stop the implementation of CAA. The Ministry stated that "the new legislation has been enacted under the Central List of the 7th Schedule of the Constitution. The states have no power to reject it". Modi stated on 21 December that the NRC had only been implemented in Assam to follow a directive from the Supreme Court of India, and that there had been no decision taken to implement it nation-wide.

Kerala becomes the first state to challenge the Citizenship Amendment Act (CAA) by filing a plea in the Supreme Court of India under Article 131 of the Constitution. Kerala Chief Minister Pinarayi Vijayan affirmed that the Citizenship Amendment Act (CAA) is viewed as divisive and declared its non-implementation in the state, asserting that it treats Muslim minorities unfairly. He stated, "All of Kerala will stand united in opposing this communally divisive law."

The Indian Union Muslim League petitioned the Supreme Court of India to declare the bill illegal. The first hearing by the Supreme Court of India on 60 petitions challenging the Act was on 18 December 2019. During the first hearing, the court declined to stay implementation of the Citizenship (Amendment) Act, 2019. On 22 January 2020, around 143 petitions, including several petitions filed after 18 December 2019 were heard. The court again declined the request for stay. The next hearing was scheduled on 21 April 2020.

=== Commentary and petitions ===
The foreign intelligence agency of India, R&AW, had expressed concern while deposing in front of the joint parliamentary committee, and had stated that the bill could be used by agents of the foreign intelligence agencies to infiltrate legally into India. Former National Security Advisor Shiv Shankar Menon called the incident a self inflicted goal that has isolated India from the International community.

Harish Salve, former Solicitor General of India, said that the bill does not violate Article 14, Article 25 and Article 21 of the Constitution of India.

A group of prominent individuals and organisations from around 12 countries representing minorities of Bangladesh released a joint statement in which they described the Act as "humanitarian" provision through which India has "partially fulfilled" its obligations towards the minorities of Bangladesh, Pakistan and Afghanistan. The National Sikh Front – a group representing the Sikhs in Jammu and Kashmir, stated that it supports the Act because it will help the Sikh refugees in India who left Afghanistan.

A petition opposing the bill was signed by more 1,000 Indian scientists and scholars. The petition stated that "The use of religion as a criterion for citizenship in the proposed bill" was "inconsistent with the basic structure of the Constitution". A similar number of Indian academicians and intellectuals released a statement in support of the legislation. The petition stated that the act "fulfills the long-standing demand of providing refuge to persecuted religious minorities from Pakistan, Bangladesh and Afghanistan".

Historian Neeti Nair commented that the Citizenship (Amendment) Act and the National Register of Citizens represent steps towards a "Hindu Rashtra" that should be "summarily dismissed both by the people and by the courts". Similar views were also expressed by social activists such as Harsh Mander, Indira Jaising. and media houses National Herald and The Caravan. The Japan Times termed the Act as "Modi's project to make a Hindu India".

== International reactions ==
- Afghanistan: Former Afghanistan President Hamid Karzai urged Government of India to treat all minorities equally. In an interview to The Hindu, he said, "We don't have persecuted minorities in Afghanistan." Mentioning the Afghanistan conflict, he said, "The whole country is persecuted. We have been in war and conflict for a long time. All religions in Afghanistan, Muslims and Hindus and Sikhs, which are our three main religions, have suffered."
- Australia: Australian Greens MP David Shoebridge tabled motion in the New South Wales Legislative Council, calling for serious attention to India's CAA, the Modi government's reaction to the democratic protests and to renegotiate trade agreements between Australia and India so that they include a human rights clause.
- Bahrain: The Shura Council (the Council of Representatives) called on the Government of India to refrain from implementing the Act, taking the rights of the Muslims into account, and respecting the international principles.
- Bangladesh: Bangladesh's Minister of Foreign Affairs, A. K. Abdul Momen said that this bill could weaken India's historic character as a secular nation and denied that minorities were facing religious persecution in his country. In an interview to Gulf News, Bangladesh Prime Minister Sheikh Hasina said, "Within India, people are facing many problems" and expressed her concerns saying, "We don't understand why (the Indian government) did it. It was not necessary". However, she maintained her stance that the CAA and NRC are internal matters of India. She also said that Prime Minister Modi assured her of no reverse migration from India.
- France: Ambassador of France to India, Emmanuel Lenain, said that France considers the legislation an internal matter of India and respects it.
- Kuwait: Around 27 lawmakers in Kuwait expressed "deep concern" over "the abusive legislative and repressive security measures taken by the Indian government against Muslims". They asked the Kuwait Government to 'exert diplomatic efforts' and to approach the UN to address the situation.
- Malaysia: The Prime Minister of Malaysia, Mahathir Mohamad, criticised the law and said it could "deprive some Muslims of their citizenship". India rejected the criticism and said the law does not "deprive any Indian of any faith of her or his citizenship".
- Maldives: Maldives' Parliament Speaker and former president, Mohamed Nasheed, said that CAA is an internal issue of India and was democratically passed through both the houses of the Parliament.
- Pakistan: Pakistan Prime Minister Imran Khan criticised the Act. Pakistan's National Assembly passed a resolution labelling the Act as a "discriminatory law" and argued that it contravened "bilateral agreements and understandings between India and Pakistan, particularly those on security and rights of minorities in the respective countries". This act was denounced by both the Hindu and Sikh communities of Pakistan. In particular, it was rejected by the Pakistan Hindu Council, a representative body of Hindus in the country. Many lawmakers were vocal in voicing their protest over this legislation. These included Lal Chand Malhi, member of the national assembly from Pakistan's ruling party Tehreek-e-Insaf, and Sachanand Lakhwani, member of the provincial assembly of Sindh.
- Russia: Deputy Russian Ambassador to India, Roman Babushkin, said that Russia considers the legislation an internal matter of India.
- Sri Lanka: Prime Minister Mahinda Rajapaksa termed the CAA as an internal matter of India. While answering a question about the non-inclusion of Sri Lankan Tamil refugees, he said, "Sri Lankans can return anytime they want. Their houses are there. They can come back anytime they want. We have no objection. Recently, around 4,000 of them returned. It all depends on what they want."
- United Kingdom: The outgoing British High Commissioner to India, Dominic Asquith, said that the UK expressed hope that the Indian government will address concerns of the people as its manifesto commitment is "sabka saath, sabka vikas, sabka vishvas" (with all, development for all, and trust of all)
- United States: The United States Commission on International Religious Freedom (USCIRF) called for sanctions against Amit Shah and "other principal leadership" over passage of the Bill. (Note: The USCIRF had earlier expressed its support for the Lautenberg-Specter Amendments, a US law that is considered similar to the CAA.) India's Ministry of External Affairs issued a statement in response, stating that the statement made by the USCIRF was "neither accurate nor warranted", and that neither the CAA nor the NRC sought to strip Indian citizens of citizenship. The United States House Committee on Foreign Affairs questioned the intent of the Bill and noted that "[a]ny religious test for citizenship undermines this most basic democratic tenet." On 19 December, however, the United States Secretary of State said that the US respects Indian democracy since it has a "robust" internal debate on the Citizenship Act. The President of the United States, Donald Trump, during his visit to India, declined to comment on the CAA and said that "it is up to India."

Two city councils, in Seattle and Cambridge, passed resolutions asking India to repeal the Citizenship Amendment Act.

=== Organisations ===
- European Union: Ambassador of the European Union to India, Ugo Astuto, said that he trusts that the outcome of the CAA discussion would be in line with the high standards set by the Indian constitution.
- Organisation of Islamic Cooperation: OIC expressed their concern about present situation of CAA-NRC and urged the Government of India to ensure the safety of the Muslim minority and to follow the obligations outlined in the Charter of the United Nations.
- United Nations: The Office of the United Nations High Commissioner for Human Rights criticised the Act and called it "fundamentally discriminatory in nature". It added, "Although India's broader naturalization laws remain in place, these amendments will have a discriminatory effect on people's access to nationality."
  - The Office of the United Nations High Commissioner for Human Rights (OHCHR) called it "fundamentally discriminatory", adding that while India's "goal of protecting persecuted groups is welcome", this should be accomplished through a non-discriminatory "robust national asylum system". The OHCHR filed an intervention in the Supreme Court of India on the Citizenship Amendment Act (CAA) in 2020.

== Implementation 2024- Present ==
Government of India released the details and rules about the implementation of the act in Gazette of India on 11 March 2024. An online portal was also opened to let the eligible refugees apply for the citizenship. Politically it was significant because it was released just before the 2024 Indian general election, and was esteemed to be an electoral gain for the BJP in the upcoming election. Opposition parties criticised the timing of the notification, accusing BJP for delaying four years to implement it just to use it as a political issue in the election. On 15 May 2024, the granting of Indian citizenship under CAA began with the first set of migrant applicants receiving their citizenship certificates.

=== Citizenship (Amendment) Act Rules, 2024 ===
The rules for applying for Indian citizenship under the act are as follows :-

1. Individuals who entered India legally from Pakistan, Bangladesh, and Afghanistan on or before 31 December 2014, and belong to the Hindu, Sikh, Buddhist, Jain, Parsi, or Christian community are eligible.

2. They must have resided legally and worked in India continuously for six years, from 2008 to 31 December 2014, and possess all necessary documents, such as valid or expired passports, ID cards, and land tenancy records, to prove their membership in one of the six specified religious groups from the aforementioned three neighbouring nations, in order to meet the eligibility criteria for Indian citizenship through naturalization.

3. The applicant is required to possess sufficient proficiency in one of the languages listed in the Eighth Schedule to the Constitution of India respectively.

4. Although the Citizenship Amendment Bill was passed on 11 December 2019, the act does not grant Indian citizenship to refugees with criminal records, or to those who immigrated into India after 31 December 2014, whether legally or illegally, as this date serves as the cut-off.

=== Extension and No Cut-off demand ===
Critics have argued that the Act's stance on persecution lacks consistency, questioning why it chooses 2014 as a cut-off date when, according to the government's own admission, persecution of minorities continues to be a persistent issue in the neighbouring nations of Pakistan, Bangladesh and Afghanistan. Refugees across India have advocated for the extension of the act, arguing that it should not have any cut-off date for providing citizenship to persecuted minorities of neighbouring nations, as persecution hasn't stopped and will not in the near future. A top official of the Indian Government has said that the cut-off date of 31 December 2014, is being kept so that the act cannot be misused by infiltrators from neighbouring countries such as Pakistan. The same official also added that if the need arises, the 2014 cut-off can be extended by bringing in necessary legal changes through amendments.

=== Date Extension ===
On 3 September 2025, the Government of India extended the cut-off date under the Citizenship (Amendment) Act, 2019 (CAA) from 31 December 2014 to 31 December 2024. The notification, issued under the Immigration and Foreigners Act, allows Hindus, Sikhs, Buddhists, Jains, Parsis, and Christians from Afghanistan, Bangladesh, and Pakistan who entered India on or before 31 December 2024 to stay in the country and apply for Indian citizenship, even if they lack valid travel documents. This marks a significant policy shift from the original 2019 framework, which restricted eligibility to migrants who had entered India by 2014. The change follows the notification of the Citizenship (Amendment) Rules, 2024, which operationalised the CAA and opened an online application process. The first citizenship certificates under the Act were granted in May 2024. The extension is expected to benefit a larger number of refugees belonging to the specified religious communities who migrated after 2014 but before the new deadline.

=== Opposition to Implementation in Northeast India 2024 ===
The Citizenship Amendment Act (CAA) implementation in Northeast India has encountered significant opposition, particularly in Assam and other states of the region. The CAA has been a contentious issue, with concerns raised about its alleged discriminatory nature and potential infringement upon indigenous rights.

The central government's decision not to implement the CAA in most tribal areas of Northeastern states has been met with mixed reactions. While some view it as a positive step towards protecting indigenous communities, others argue that many parts of northeast like whole of Assam is still not covered under the 6th schedule and thereby not excluded under CAA

Among the Northeastern states, Assam is most affected by issues related to illegal immigration, primarily due to its porous borders with Bangladesh.

Existing student bodies in the Northeast, such as the Northeast Student Union (NESU), have faced criticism for their perceived silence on the CAA issue. Despite the recent abolishment of the Free Movement Regime (FMR) between India and Myanmar, NESU has remained relatively inactive in addressing the concerns of the region's inhabitants.

In response to the perceived lack of action by existing student unions, a new initiative called the Wesean Student Federation (WSF) was formed in March 2024. The WSF and other organisations like the Naga Student Federation has also sought international intervention on the issue, urging the United Nations to address the discriminatory nature of the CAA and its potential threat to the sovereignty and rights of indigenous peoples in the region.

In light of the opposition to the CAA in Northeast India, there have been calls for the Indian government to exclude the entire region from the purview of the legislation.

Moreover, Assam's Bodoland Territorial Region (BTR), Dima Hasao, West Karbi Anglong and East Karbi Anglong Districts, which comprise about 35% of the total state area, fall under the Sixth Schedule to the Constitution of India. The remaining area does not come under the Sixth Schedule and is not exempted from the Citizenship Amendment Act. On 11 March 2024, All Assam Students Union Chief Advisor Samujjal Bhattacharya, while agitating against the CAA, raised a question to the Assam Government: 'How is it beneficial for Nagaon and Kamrup if it is wrong for Kokrajhar and Karbi Anglong in Assam?' On 6 April 2015, the Government of India planned to grant Scheduled Tribe status to six indigenous Assamese communities: Ahoms, Koch-Rajbongshis, Tea tribes, Morans, Motaks, and Chutiyas. These six communities account for roughly 60% of the state's population. If the bill is passed someday, Assam will eventually become a tribal-majority state with Sixth Schedule status applied to the entire state, thus leading to the full exemption of the Citizenship Amendment Act, preventing further future Illegal Immigration. The Home Ministry is in touch with the tribal affairs department to consider the proposal but has not yet introduced any Constitutional Amendment Bill for it. According to the 2011 Census, Tribals constitute 12.8% of the state population. Various organizations in Assam, such as the Asom Jatiyatabadi Yuba Chatra Parishad (AJYCP), have demanded the implementation of an Inner Line Permit system to protect and prevent the state from further illegal immigrants.

=== Initiation of Granting Citizenship under CAA ===
On 15 May 2024, the first set of citizenship certificates were issued to 14 migrants under the Citizenship Amendment Act (CAA), nearly two months after the Centre notified it, initiating the process of granting Indian nationality to migrant applicants under the CAA. Central Home Secretary Ajay Kumar Bhalla handed over the citizenship certificates to the 14 applicants in Delhi, after their applications were processed online. Over 350 people were granted Indian citizenship online (digitally signed certificates through email), with Amit Shah acknowledging 25,000+ pending applications, where the processing involves the Election Commission of India (ECI) and district-level committees (DLC) chaired by senior superintendents.

After receiving Indian citizenship, there were celebrations at the Hindu refugee camp in Delhi's Adarsh Nagar as several family members received their citizenship certificates after many years of living with temporary status, since they left Pakistan. Similarly, Pakistani Hindu refugees living in north Delhi's "Majnu ka Tila" expressed hopes for a better future, and some people who received their citizenship hailed it as the first day of their "new life" in India.

== See also ==
- Illegal immigration to India
- Indian nationality law
- National Register of Citizens
- Refugees in India
- The Foreigners Act, 1946
- Illegal Migrants (Determination by Tribunals) Act, 1983
- Assam Accord (1985)
- 1971 Bangladesh genocide
- Religious discrimination in Pakistan
- Communalism (South Asia)

== Sources ==
=== Bibliography ===
- Universal's The Citizenship Act, 1955 (PDF), Universal Law Publishing Co., 2004 – via United Nations High Commission for Refugees
- Das, Pushpita (2016), Illegal Migration From Bangladesh: Deportation, Border Fences and Work Permits (PDF), Institute for Defence Studies and Analyses, ISBN 978-93-82169-69-7
- Gillan, Michael (2007), "Refugees or infiltrators? The Bharatiya Janata Party and "illegal" migration from Bangladesh", Asian Studies Review, 26 (1): 73–95, doi:10.1080/10357820208713331, ISSN 1035-7823, S2CID 146522066
- Jayal, Niraja Gopal (2013), Citizenship and its Discontents: An Indian History, Harvard University Press, ISBN 978-0-674-06758-5
- Jayal, Niraja Gopal (2019), "Reconfiguring Citizenship in Contemporary India", South Asia: Journal of South Asian Studies, 42 (1): 33–50, doi:10.1080/00856401.2019.1555874, ISSN 0085-6401, S2CID 151037291
- Gupta, Kanchan (2019), "Beyond the poll rhetoric of BJP's contentious Citizenship Amendment Bill", Orf, Observer Research Foundation
- Kudaisya, Gyanesh (2006). "Divided Landscapes, Fragmented Identities: East Bengal Refugees and Their Rehabilitation in India, 1947–79". Singapore Journal of Tropical Geography. 17 (1): 24–39. doi:10.1111/j.1467-9493.1996.tb00082.x. ISSN 0129-7619.
- Nakatani, Tetsuya (2000), "Away from Home: The Movement and Settlement of Refugees from East Pakistan in West Bengal, India", Journal of the Japanese Association for South Asian Studies, 2000 (12): 73–109, doi:10.11384/jjasas1989.2000.73
- Poddar, Mihika (2018), "The Citizenship (Amendment) Bill, 2016: international law on religion-based discrimination and naturalisation law", Indian Law Review, 2 (1): 108–118, doi:10.1080/24730580.2018.1512290, S2CID 158325181
- Ranjan, Amit (2019), "National Register of Citizen Update: History and its impact", Asian Ethnicity, 22 (3): 1–17, doi:10.1080/14631369.2019.1629274, S2CID 198727392
- Roy, Anupama (2010), Mapping Citizenship in India, OUP India, ISBN 978-0-19-908820-1
- Roy, Anupama (14 December 2019), "The Citizenship (Amendment) Bill, 2016 and the Aporia of Citizenship", Economic and Political Weekly, 54 (49)
- Roy, Haimanti (2013), Partitioned Lives: Migrants, Refugees, Citizens in India and Pakistan, 1947–65, OUP India, ISBN 978-0-19-808177-7
- Sadiq, Kamal (2008), Paper Citizens: How Illegal Immigrants Acquire Citizenship in Developing Countries, Oxford University Press, ISBN 978-0-19-970780-5
- Sarker, Shuvro Prosun (2017), Refugee Law in India: The Road from Ambiguity to Protection, Springer, ISBN 978-981-10-4807-4
- Sen, Uditi (2018), Citizen Refugee: Forging the Indian Nation after Partition, Cambridge University Press, ISBN 978-1-108-42561-2
- Shamshad, Rizwana (2017), Bangladeshi Migrants in India: Foreigners, Refugees, or Infiltrators?, OUP India, ISBN 978-0-19-909159-1
- Sharma, Chetna (2019), "Citizenship Amendment Bill 2016: Continuities and contestations with special reference to politics in Assam, India", Asian Ethnicity, 20 (4): 522–540, doi:10.1080/14631369.2019.1601993, S2CID 150837053
- Sinharay, Praskanva (2019), "To Be a Hindu Citizen: Politics of Dalit Migrants in Contemporary West Bengal", South Asia: Journal of South Asian Studies, 42 (2): 359–374, doi:10.1080/00856401.2019.1581696, S2CID 150566285
- Weiner, Myron (June 1983), "The Political Demography of Assam's Anti-Immigrant Movement", Population and Development Review, 9 (2), Population Council: 279–292, doi:10.2307/1973053, JSTOR 1973053
