= Illegal Migrants (Determination by Tribunals) Act, 1983 =

Parliament of India
- Enacted by: Parliament of India
- Status: Repealed

The Illegal Migrants (Determination by Tribunals) Act, 1981 (IMDT) was an Act of the Parliament of India enacted in 1983 by the Indira Gandhi government. It was struck down by the Supreme Court of India in 2005 in Sarbananda Sonowal v. Union of India.

The IMDT Act described the procedures to detect illegal immigrants (from Bangladesh) and expel them from Assam. The Act was pushed through mainly on the grounds that it provided special protections against undue harassment to the minorities affected by the Assam Agitation. This law was applicable to the state of Assam only whereas in other states, detection of foreigners is done under The Foreigners Act, 1946.

The act made it difficult to deport illegal immigrants from Assam.

== Salient features ==
The Foreigners Act, 1946 defines a foreigner as a person who is not a citizen of India. Section 9 of the Act states that, where the nationality of a person is not evident as per preceding section 8, the onus of proving whether a person is a foreigner or not, shall lie upon such person.

However, under the Illegal Migrants (Determination by Tribunal ) (IMDT) Act, the burden of proving the citizenship or otherwise rested on the accuser and the police, not the accused. This was a major departure from the provisions of the Foreigners Act, 1946.

The accuser must reside within a 3 km radius of the accused, fill out a complaint form (a maximum of ten per accuser is allowed) and pay a fee of twenty five rupees.

If a suspected illegal migrant is thus successfully accused, he is required by the Act to simply produce a ration card to prove his Indian citizenship.

And if a case made it past these requirements, a system of tribunals made up of retired judges would finally decide on deportation based on the facts.

The act also provided that 'if the application is found frivolous or vexatious' the Central Government may not accept it.

It excluded the migrants who entered India before 25 March 1971 from the illegal-migration accusation. And for post-1971 migrants too, the procedure for deporting was tough.

== Political Commentary ==
In 1991, an unnamed Asom Gana Parishad legislator described the act as follows:

But the Citizenship Act 1955, as amended on December 7, entails that the immigrants must first have their names registered. Besides, the mandatory gap of ten years is calculated from the date of registration. The process of detection of infiltraters is itself lopsided. The Illegal Migrants Detection Tribunal (IMDT) shifts the onus of responsibility not on the accused person but on the person / citizen who brings about the charge. Besides, the accuser has to pay fixed sum and must reside within a fixed area from the residence of the accused person. Such clause only makes a farce of the detection process. A review of the conditions spelt out by the organisation of non-political Muslims for its acceptance of the intensive revision of role bears perusal: Names of all Indian citizens whose claims were accepted in the 1993 revision of voters rolls but subsequently rejected during special revision in 1994, are to be automatically included in the proposed intensive revision. During the revision, all documents admissible under the Indian Evidence Act are accepted to prove linkage and citizenship, and the 1966 voters list be supplied to all political parties and organisation concerned. The CPM has strongly criticised this stand. Under the present circumstances, the Congress (I) Government appears to be enjoying the issue of the foreigners influx from Bangladesh and Nepal, especially the former when it accepted the 1971 revised roll, cannot be wished away. The most despicable of the Assam Accord provisions is the one that pertains to the disenfranchising immigrants coming to Assam between 1947-1975 for a period of just ten years, after which they automatically become citizens of India. Nowhere in the world does one come across such illogical propositions. The main AGP stalwarts now were the signatories on the accord from the agitators side. It were they who made this obnoxious provision a part and parcel of the upper hand.

== Supreme Court's views ==
The Act was challenged by Sarbananda Sonowal in courts. In 2005 a three-judge Bench of the Supreme Court of India held that the Illegal Migrants (Determination by Tribunals) Act, 1983 and rules "has created the biggest hurdle and is the main impediment or barrier in the identification and deportation of illegal migrants" and struck down the Act.

The court also observed "(the conviction rate under the IMDT act) comes to less than half per cent of the cases initiated...(the IMDT Act) is coming to the advantage of such illegal migrants as any proceedings initiated against them almost entirely ends in their favour, enables them to have a document having official sanctity to the effect that they are not illegal migrants."

On 9 August 2012, the Supreme Court hearing a public interest litigation petition seeking a direction for deportation of illegal migrants, was told that the Government of India, as a matter of policy, "does not support any kind of illegal migration either into its territory or illegal immigration of its citizens. "It was also stated that the Government is committed to deporting illegal Bangladeshi migrants, but only lawfully. It asserted that the demand for deleting the names of alleged 41 lakh doubtful voters from the list of 2006 on the basis of religious and linguistic profiling would prima facie be illegal, arbitrary and violative of the secular and democratic credentials of India. The court posted the matter for final hearing on 6 November 2012.

== See also ==
- Illegal immigration to India
- Citizenship (Amendment) Act, 2019
- The Foreigners Act, 1946
- Indian nationality law
- National Register of Citizens
