= Visa policy of India =

Policy on permits required to enter India

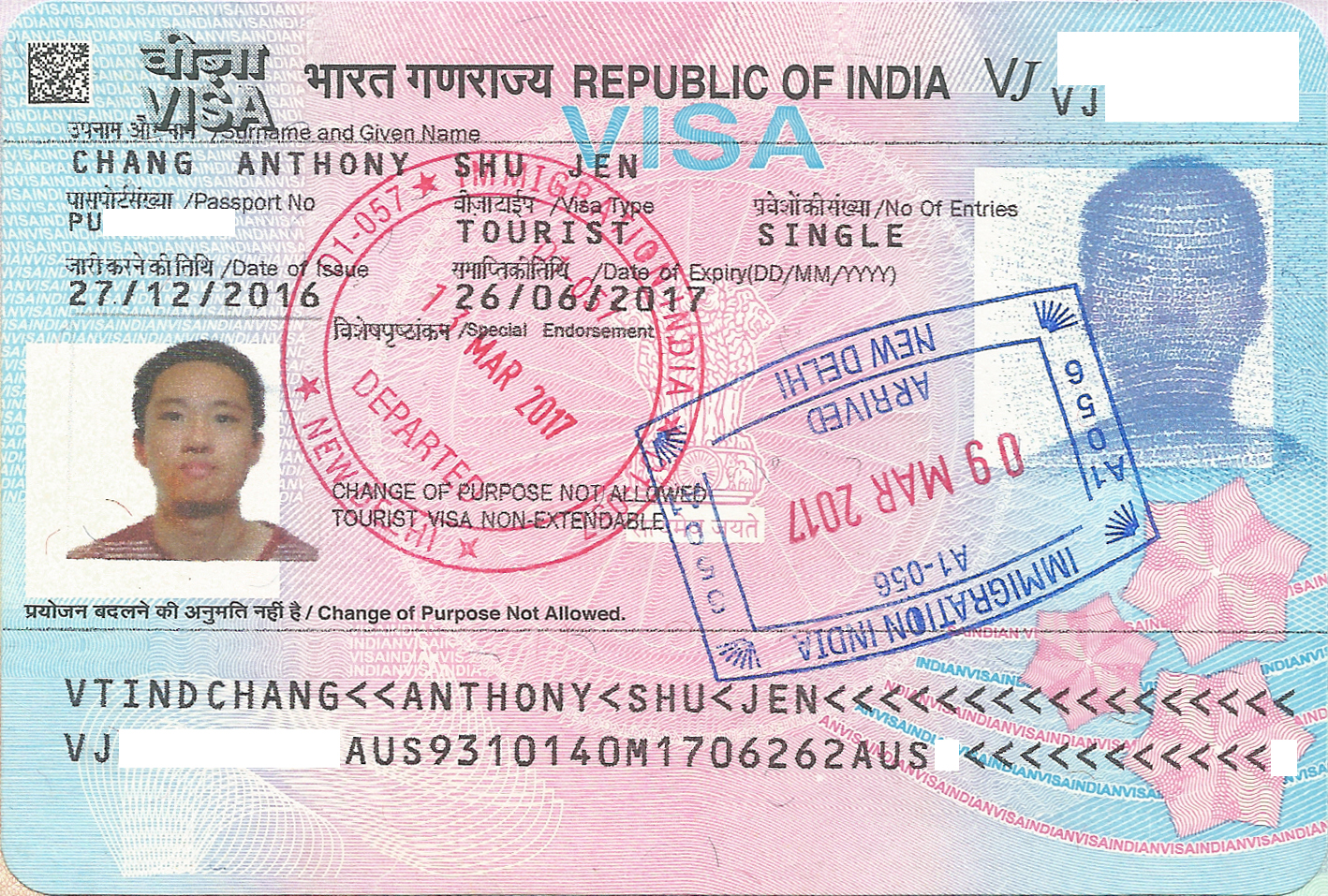
Indian tourist visa issued in Australia with Indian entry and exit stamps

Visitors to India must obtain a visa from one of the Indian diplomatic missions unless they are citizens from one of the visa-exempt countries. Citizens of certain countries may obtain a visa on arrival or an e-Visa.

== Visa policy map ==
Visa policy of India India Freedom of movement Visa not required (90 days) Visa on arrival (60 days) eVisa (all categories, 30 to 180 days) eVisa (limited categories) Visa required Admission refused

== Freedom of movement ==
Nationals of the following countries do not need visas or passports to enter India, and may live and work in India without any limit of stay. However, they must not arrive from, or transit through, mainland China, Hong Kong, Macau, or Pakistan prior to seeking entry into India.

- Bhutan
- Nepal

=== Overseas citizens of India and persons of Indian origin ===
Foreign nationals possessing either a valid Overseas Citizen of India card or a Persons of Indian Origin Card are exempt from visa requirements and may live and work in India without any limit of stay.

In addition, according to Timatic, foreign nationals possessing an expired Persons of Indian Origin Card that expired after 9 January 2015 may also enter India without a visa. This policy does not apply to nationals of Bangladesh and Pakistan, as they are not entitled to hold an Overseas Citizenship of India.

== Visa exemption ==
=== Ordinary passports ===
- Maldives
Since March 1979, nationals of the Maldives do not need a visa to enter India for a maximum stay of 90 days.

=== Non-ordinary passports ===
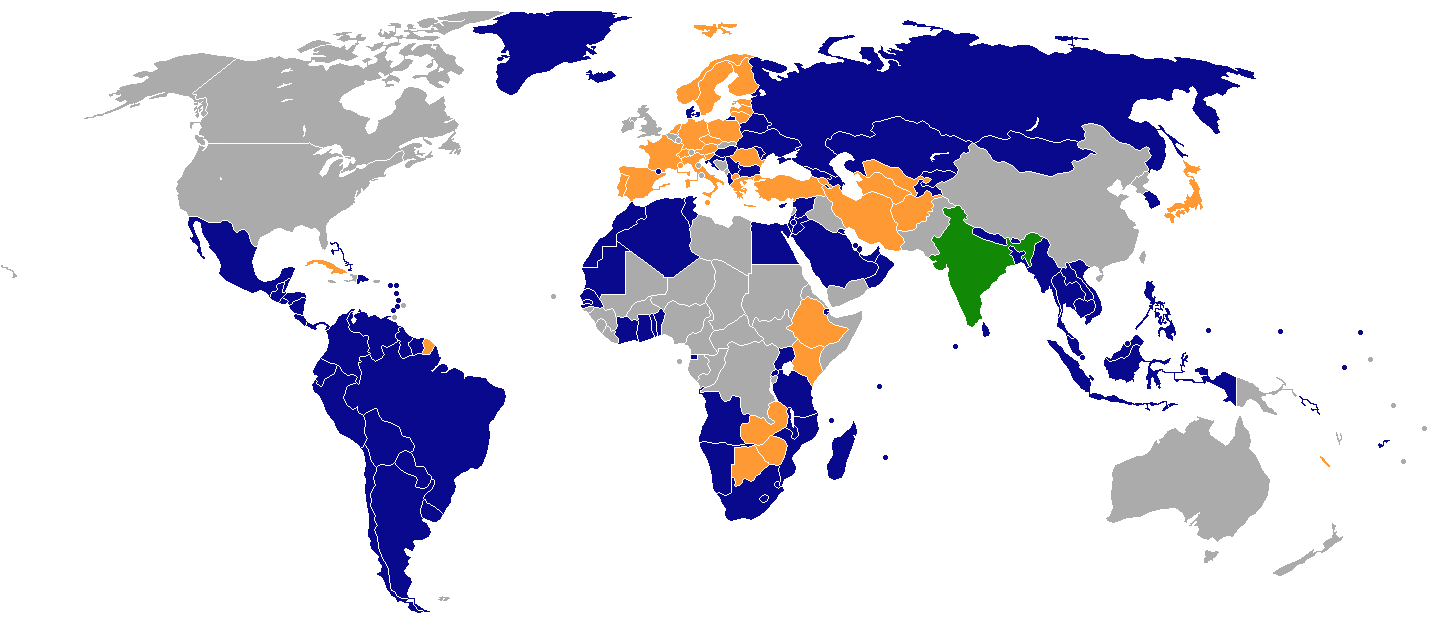
Visa policy for diplomatic, official or service passport holders India Visa not required for diplomatic, official or service passport holders Visa not required for diplomatic passport holders Visa required for diplomatic or official passport holders

Under reciprocal agreements, holders of diplomatic or various types of passports (consular, official, service and special) of the following countries and territories may enter and remain in India without a visa for the following period:

Indefinite period

- Albania^{D O}
- Belarus^{D O}
- Bhutan^{D O S}
- Denmark^{D O}
- Nepal^{D O S}
- Singapore^{D O}

90 days

- Algeria^{D O S}
- Andorra^{D O}
- Angola^{D O S}
- Antigua and Barbuda^{D O}
- Armenia^{D}
- Argentina^{D O}
- Austria^{D}
- Azerbaijan^{D O S}
- Bahrain^{D O Sp}
- Bahamas^{D O}
- Belize^{D O S}
- Benin^{D O S}
- Bolivia^{D O}
- Botswana^{D}
- Brazil^{D O S}
- Bulgaria^{D O S}
- Chile^{D O}
- Colombia^{D O}
- Comoros^{D O S}
- Costa Rica^{D O S}
- Cuba^{D}
- Cyprus^{D O S}
- Czech Republic^{D}
- Djibouti^{D O S}
- Dominica^{D O}
- Dominican Republic^{D O}
- Egypt^{D O S Sp}
- El Salvador^{D O}
- Equatorial Guinea^{D O S}
- Estonia^{D}
- Eswatini^{D O S}
- Ethiopia^{D}
- Fiji^{D O}
- Finland^{D}
- France^{D}
- Gambia^{D O}
- Georgia^{D O S}
- Germany^{D}
- Ghana^{D O S}
- Greece^{D}
- Grenada^{D O}
- Guatemala^{D O}
- Guyana^{D O S}
- Honduras^{D O}
- Hungary^{D O}
- Iceland^{D O}
- Israel^{D O S}
- Italy^{D}
- Japan^{D}
- Jordan^{D O}
- Kenya^{D}
- Kyrgyzstan^{D O S}
- Latvia^{D}
- Lesotho^{D O}
- Lithuania^{D}
- Madagascar^{D O S}
- Malawi^{D O}
- Malaysia^{D O}
- Maldives^{D O}
- Malta^{D}
- Marshall Islands^{D O}
- Mauritania^{D O S}
- Mauritius^{D O}
- Mexico^{D O}
- Micronesia^{D O}
- Moldova^{D O}
- Monaco^{D}
- Mongolia^{D O}
- Mozambique^{D O}
- Myanmar^{D O}
- Namibia^{D O}
- Nauru^{D O}
- Netherlands^{D}
- Nicaragua^{D O S}
- North Macedonia^{D}
- Norway^{D}
- Oman^{D O S Sp}
- Palau^{D O}
- Palestine^{D O}
- Panama^{D O C}
- Paraguay^{D O}
- Peru^{D O S}
- Poland^{D}
- Portugal^{D}
- Qatar^{D O Sp}
- Romania^{D}
- Russia^{D O S}
- Rwanda^{D O}
- Saint Kitts and Nevis^{D O S}
- Saint Lucia^{D O}
- Saint Vincent and the Grenadines^{D O}
- Saudi Arabia^{D O Sp}
- Senegal^{D O S}
- Serbia^{D O}
- Seychelles^{D O}
- Solomon Islands^{D O}
- South Africa^{D O}
- South Korea^{D O}
- Spain^{D}
- Slovenia^{D}
- Sweden^{D}
- Switzerland^{D}
- Tanzania^{D O S}
- Thailand^{D O}
- Timor-Leste^{D O}
- Togo^{D O Sp}
- Tunisia^{D O Sp}
- Turkey^{D}
- Uganda^{D O}
- United Arab Emirates^{D O Sp}
- Ukraine^{D O}
- Venezuela^{D O S}
- Vietnam^{D O}
- Zambia^{D}
- Zimbabwe^{D}

60 days

- Cambodia^{D O}
- Kuwait^{D O Sp}
- Syria^{D O}
- Uzbekistan^{D}

45 days

- Bangladesh^{D O}

30 days

- Afghanistan^{D}
- Croatia^{D O S}
- Ecuador^{D O}
- Indonesia^{D O}
- Iran^{D}
- Ivory Coast^{D O}
- Kazakhstan^{D O S}
- Laos^{D O}
- Morocco^{D O S}
- Philippines^{D O}
- Sri Lanka^{D O}
- Suriname^{D O S}
- Tajikistan^{D O}
- Turkmenistan^{D}
- Uruguay^{D O}

14 days

- Brunei^{D O}

_{C - Consular passports}
_{D - Diplomatic passports}
_{O - Official passports}
_{S - Service passports}
_{Sp - Special passports}

== Visa on arrival ==
Clickable map of airports that issue visas on arrival.

Nationals of the following countries holding ordinary passports may apply for a visa on arrival (VOA) at certain airports:

- Japan
- South Korea
- United Arab Emirates (Note: Only applicable to UAE nationals who had previously obtained an e-Visa or regular visa for India.)

Airports
- Bengaluru
- Chennai
- Delhi
- Hyderabad
- Kolkata
- Mumbai

The visa on arrival is issued to visitors for business, tourism, medical or conference purposes, for a stay of up to 60 days, at a cost of ₹2,000.

Visitors are not eligible for this facility if they or any of their parents or grandparents were born in or have permanently resided in Pakistan, in which case they may only apply for a visa at an Indian diplomatic post.

The VOA facility can be used up to 2 times in a calendar year.

Alternatively, foreign nationals eligible for a VOA can apply for an e-Visa instead if they intend to enter the country through an entry point not covered by the VOA scheme.

== Electronic visa (e-Visa) ==
Indian e-Visa

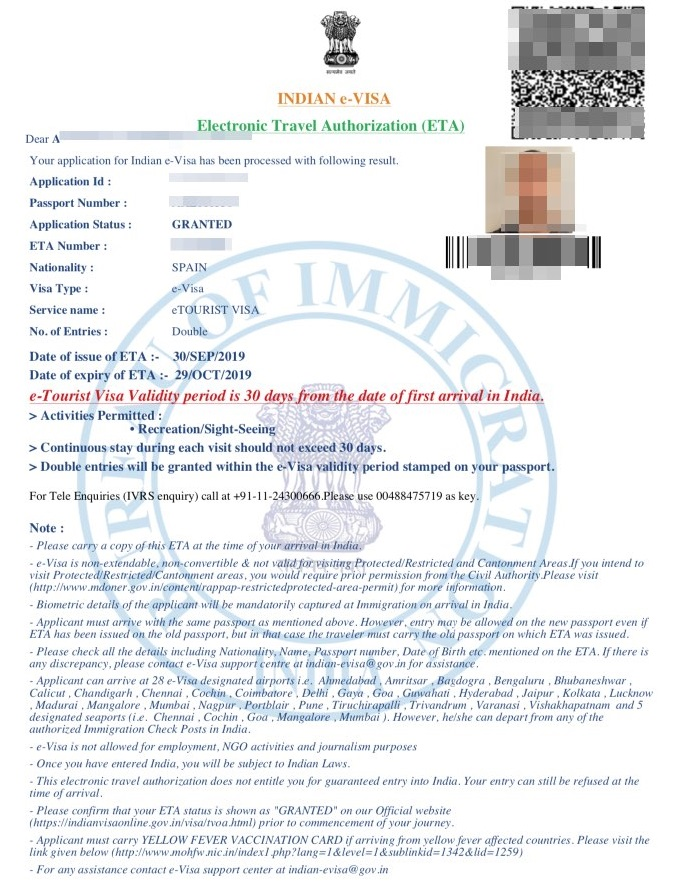
- Sample of Indian eVisa
- Owner: Bureau of Immigration
- Website: indianvisaonline.gov.in

Nationals of the following countries holding ordinary passports may apply for an electronic visa (e-Visa) online:

- All ASEAN member states
- All European Union member states (Note: The Indian government also lists Aruba in addition to the Netherlands, but they have the same nationality and passport.)
- Albania
- Andorra
- Angola
- Antigua and Barbuda
- Argentina
- Armenia
- Australia
- Azerbaijan
- Bahamas
- Bahrain
- Barbados
- Belarus
- Belize
- Benin
- Bolivia
- Bosnia and Herzegovina
- Botswana
- Brazil
- Burundi
- Cameroon
- Canada
- Cape Verde
- Chile
- China (Note: Including Hong Kong and Macau. Only for production investment e-Visa.)
- Colombia
- Comoros
- Costa Rica
- Cuba
- Djibouti
- Dominica
- Dominican Republic
- Ecuador
- El Salvador
- Equatorial Guinea
- Eritrea
- Eswatini
- Fiji
- Gabon
- Gambia
- Georgia
- Ghana
- Grenada
- Guatemala
- Guinea
- Guyana
- Haiti
- Honduras
- Iceland
- Israel
- Ivory Coast
- Jamaica
- Japan
- Jordan
- Kazakhstan
- Kenya
- Kiribati
- Kuwait
- Kyrgyzstan
- Lesotho
- Liberia
- Liechtenstein
- Madagascar
- Malawi
- Mali
- Marshall Islands
- Mauritania
- Mauritius
- Mexico
- Micronesia
- Moldova
- Monaco
- Mongolia
- Montenegro
- Morocco
- Mozambique
- Namibia
- Nauru
- New Zealand (Note: The Indian government also lists the Cook Islands and Niue in addition to New Zealand, but they have the same nationality and passport.)
- Nicaragua
- Niger
- North Macedonia
- Norway
- Oman
- Palau
- Palestine
- Panama
- Papua New Guinea
- Paraguay
- Peru
- Qatar
- Russia
- Rwanda
- Saint Kitts and Nevis
- Saint Lucia
- Saint Vincent and the Grenadines
- Samoa
- San Marino
- Saudi Arabia
- Senegal
- Serbia
- Seychelles
- Sierra Leone
- Solomon Islands
- South Africa
- South Korea
- Sri Lanka
- Suriname
- Switzerland
- Taiwan
- Tajikistan
- Tanzania
- Togo
- Tonga
- Trinidad and Tobago
- Tuvalu
- Uganda
- Ukraine
- United Arab Emirates
- United Kingdom (Note: The Indian government also lists the Crown Dependencies of Guernsey, Isle of Man and Jersey, and the British Overseas Territories of Anguilla, Cayman Islands, Gibraltar, Montserrat and Turks and Caicos Islands, all of which have an individual version of the British passport different from the United Kingdom. The British Overseas Territories also have a different class of British nationality.)
- United States
- Uruguay
- Uzbekistan
- Vanuatu
- Vatican City
- Venezuela
- Zambia
- Zimbabwe

E-Visas are issued for several categories, validity periods and fees, which also vary for some nationalities:

Category	Validity	Maximum stay	Fee (USD) (Note: In addition to the e-Visa fee, there is a fee of 3% if the payment is made by credit or debit card, or 4% if made by PayPal.)
Tourist	30 days	30 days, from April to June	10 (Note: Free of charge for nationals of Argentina, Cook Islands, Fiji, Indonesia, Jamaica, Kiribati, Marshall Islands, Mauritius, Micronesia, Mongolia, Myanmar, Nauru, Niue, Palau, Papua New Guinea, Samoa, Seychelles, Solomon Islands, Tonga, Tuvalu, Uruguay and Vanuatu.) (Note: Free of charge for nationals of Malaysia, Philippines, Russia, South Africa and Thailand.)
Tourist	30 days	30 days, from July to March	25
Tourist	1 year	180 days per year	40 (Note: 25 USD for nationals of Japan, Singapore, South Africa and Sri Lanka.)
Tourist	5 years	180 days per year	200 (Note: Different fees (in USD) for nationals of Japan (25), Mozambique (220), Russia (120), South Africa (25), Sri Lanka (25), United Kingdom including Crown Dependencies and Gibraltar (484) and United States (160).)
Tourist (mountaineering)	6 months		
Business	1 year	180 days per stay	120 (Note: Free of charge for nationals of Angola, Benin, Burundi, Cambodia, Comoros, Djibouti, Eritrea, Gambia, Guinea, Haiti, Laos, Lesotho, Liberia, Madagascar, Malawi, Mali, Mauritania, Mozambique, Niger, Rwanda, Senegal, Sierra Leone, Tanzania, Timor-Leste, Togo, Uganda and Zambia. Different fees (in USD) for nationals of Australia (215), Czech Republic (190), Ecuador (240), France (165), Ireland (200), Japan (25), New Zealand (130), Philippines (220), Poland (145), Saudi Arabia (215), South Africa (25), Sri Lanka (80), Thailand (200), Ukraine (130), United Arab Emirates (415), United Kingdom including Crown Dependencies and Gibraltar (242) and United States (140).)
Business (conference)	30 days	30 days	
Business (film)	1 year		
Medical or attendant	1 year	1 year	80 (Note: Free of charge for nationals of Kazakhstan and South Africa. Different fees (in USD) for nationals of Japan (25), Russia (120), Sri Lanka (25), Ukraine (85), United Kingdom including Crown Dependencies and Gibraltar (129) and United States (100).)
Student or family	1 year		
Transit	30 days	30 days	
Miscellaneous (PIO or spouse)	3 months	3 months	
Production investment	6 months		

Applications for e-Visas must be made between 4 and 120 days before arrival. All categories of e-Visas allow multiple entries.

Applicants are not eligible for e-Visas if they or any of their parents or grandparents were born in or have permanently resided in Pakistan, in which case they may only apply for a visa at an Indian diplomatic post.

Clickable map of entry points that allow entry with an e-Visa. Airport Seaport Landport

E-Visas may only be used for arrival at the following entry points:

Airports
Seaports
- Ahmedabad
- Amritsar
- Bagdogra
- Bengaluru
- Bhopal
- Bhubaneswar
- Chandigarh
- Chennai
- Coimbatore
- Delhi
- Gaya
- Goa–Dabolim
- Goa–Mopa
- Guwahati
- Hyderabad
- Indore
- Jaipur
- Kannur
- Kochi
- Kolkata
- Kozhikode
- Lucknow
- Madurai
- Mangaluru
- Mumbai–Navi
- Mumbai–Shivaji
- Nagpur
- Port Blair
- Pune
- Surat
- Thiruvananthapuram
- Tiruchirappalli
- Tirupati
- Varanasi
- Vijayawada
- Visakhapatnam
- Agatti
- Alang
- Bhavnagar
- Chennai
- Chennai–Kamarajar
- Chennai–Kattupalli
- Cuddalore
- Dahej
- Dhamra
- Goa
- Haldia
- Jamnagar–Bedi
- Jamnagar–Sikka
- Kakinada
- Kandla–Deendayal
- Kandla–Tuna Tekra
- Karaikal
- Kochi
- Kochi–Vallarpadam
- Kolkata
- Kollam
- Kozhikode
- Mandvi
- Mangaluru
- Mumbai
- Mumbai–Nhava Sheva
- Mundra
- Nagapattinam
- Nellore–Krishnapatnam
- Paradeep
- Porbandar
- Port Blair
- Rajula–Pipavav
- Surat–Hazira
- Thiruvananthapuram–Vizhinjam
- Thiruvananthapuram–International
- Thoothukudi
- Visakhapatnam

List of Land-border crossings

Port of entry	Opposite side
Agartala	Bangladesh
Attari	Pakistan
Darranga	Bhutan
Dawki	Bangladesh
Gede	Bangladesh
Ghojadanga	Bangladesh
Haridaspur–Petrapole	Bangladesh
Jaigaon	Bhutan
Jogbani	Nepal
Moreh	Myanmar
Raxaul	Nepal
Rupaidiha	Nepal

Exit is possible via any authorized immigration check post. In case of e-Visas that allow multiple entries, there are reports that after the first entry at one of the allowed entry points, entry is possible at another time at any regular border entry point with that same e-Visa.

In a separate module, nationals of Afghanistan may apply for six categories of electronic visas: business (including dependents), student, medical, attendant, entry (sponsored cultural events, children of medical visa holders, stepchildren of Indians, owners of property in India, dependents of international officials, parents of student visa holders, seamen, people of Indian origin and their spouses, religious minorities) and United Nations diplomat visas.

Date of e-Visa eligibility
- 27 November 2014: Australia, Brazil, Cambodia, Djibouti, Fiji, Finland, Germany, Indonesia, Israel, Japan, Jordan, Kenya, Kiribati, Laos, Luxembourg, Marshall Islands, Mauritius, Mexico, Micronesia, Myanmar, Nauru, New Zealand (including Cook Islands and Niue), Norway, Oman, Palau, Palestine, Papua New Guinea, Philippines, Russia, Samoa, Singapore, Solomon Islands, South Korea, Thailand, Tonga, Tuvalu, Ukraine, United Arab Emirates, United States, Vanuatu, Vietnam
- January 2015: Guyana
- 14 April 2015: Sri Lanka
- 1 May 2015: Antigua and Barbuda, Bahamas, Barbados, Belize, Canada, Chile, Costa Rica, Dominica, Dominican Republic, Ecuador, El Salvador, Estonia, France, Georgia, Grenada, Haiti, Honduras, Latvia, Liechtenstein, Lithuania, Montenegro, Nicaragua, North Macedonia, Paraguay, Saint Kitts and Nevis, Vatican City, and British Overseas Territories citizens of Anguilla, Cayman Islands and Montserrat
- 30 July 2015: China (including Hong Kong and Macau)
- 15 August 2015: Andorra, Argentina, Armenia, Belgium, Bolivia, Colombia, Cuba, East Timor, Guatemala, Hungary, Ireland, Jamaica, Malaysia, Malta, Monaco, Mongolia, Mozambique, Netherlands (including Aruba), Panama, Peru, Poland, Portugal, Saint Lucia, Saint Vincent and the Grenadines, Seychelles, Slovenia, Spain, Suriname, Sweden, Taiwan, Tanzania, United Kingdom, Uruguay, Venezuela, and British Overseas Territories citizens of Turks and Caicos Islands
- 26 February 2016: Albania, Austria, Bosnia and Herzegovina, Botswana, Brunei, Bulgaria, Cape Verde, Comoros, Croatia, Czech Republic, Denmark, Eritrea, Gabon, Gambia, Ghana, Greece, Guinea, Iceland, Ivory Coast, Lesotho, Liberia, Madagascar, Malawi, Moldova, Namibia, Romania, San Marino, Senegal, Serbia, Slovakia, South Africa, Swaziland, Switzerland, Tajikistan, Trinidad and Tobago, Zambia, Zimbabwe
- 1 April 2017: Angola, Azerbaijan, Burundi, Cameroon, Cyprus, Italy, Mali, Niger, Rwanda, Sierra Leone, Uzbekistan
- July 2017: Uganda
- February–June 2018: Iran
- February 2018: Kazakhstan
- 26 April 2018: Kyrgyzstan
- 23 August 2018: Qatar
- 17 June 2019: Saudi Arabia
- October 2019: Belarus, Benin
- February 2020: Equatorial Guinea
- August 2020: Togo
- April 2021: removed Canada, China (including Hong Kong and Macau), Indonesia, Iran, Kazakhstan, Kyrgyzstan, Malaysia, Qatar, Saudi Arabia, Sri Lanka, Tajikistan, United Kingdom (except British Overseas Territories citizens), Uzbekistan
- August 2021: Afghanistan, only for emergency e-Visa
- December 2022: resumed Indonesia, Kazakhstan, Kyrgyzstan, Malaysia, Sri Lanka, Tajikistan, United Kingdom, Uzbekistan
- 20 December 2022: resumed Canada
- 9 March 2023: resumed Saudi Arabia
- 21 September 2023: suspended Canada
- 22 November 2023: resumed Canada
- 19 December 2023: British citizens of Guernsey, Isle of Man and Jersey, and British Overseas Territories citizens of Gibraltar
- January 2024: Morocco
- June 2024: Bangladesh, only for medical and attendant e-Visas
- 1 August 2024: resumed China (including Hong Kong and Macau), only for business e-Visa
- June–December 2024: removed Bangladesh
- 16 February 2025: resumed Qatar
- 29 April 2025: replaced emergency e-Visa with six categories of electronic visas for nationals of Afghanistan
- July 2025: Mauritania
- 9 July 2025: Bahrain
- 13 July 2025: Kuwait
- December 2025: replaced business e-Visa with production investment for nationals of China (including Hong Kong and Macau)
- May–June 2026: suspended Uganda
- September 2026: resumed Uganda

== History ==
=== 2013 ===
In October 2013, India decided to initiate the process of extending visa-on-arrival access to 40 more nations. In January 2014, plans were confirmed by Minister of State for Parliamentary Affairs and Planning of India. The sixteen different types of visa would also be reduced to three: work, business and tourism. The proposal initially met resistance from intelligence agencies and the possible problem of queues emerged.

=== 2014 ===
In February 2014 it was announced that Indian intelligence agencies had given their approval to visa-on-arrival for up to 180 countries, largely due to the new possibilities provided by the Immigration, Visa and Foreigners' Registration and Tracking (IVFRT) system. The system would not be a typical visa on arrival in order to avoid clutter at the airports, but a system based on a prior online application modelled after Australian Electronic Travel Authority system.

On 5 February 2014 it was decided to introduce visa-on-arrival to tourists from 180 countries. Technical implementation, such as setting up the website for applications, was expected to take about 6 months and the authorities hoped to have it in place for the tourist season beginning in October 2014. Prospective visitors would have to pay a fee and the electronic version of the visa should be granted within three days. The program was expected to apply to all international airports. However, nationals of Afghanistan, Iran, Iraq, Nigeria, Pakistan, Somalia, Sudan were to be excluded from this program.

In July 2014 it was announced that India hoped to implement the program for citizens of 40 countries in the first phase by December 2014 and later on for 109 additional countries if the first phase were implemented successfully.

In August 2014 it was revealed that ministries of Tourism, Home Affairs and External Affairs could not agree on the list of countries for the ETA. The Ministry of Tourism proposed to allow the new system for the citizens of the 15 countries with the most visitors to India, the Ministry of External Affairs proposed to create a balanced list with some Asian and African countries, while the Ministry of Home Affairs proposed to exclude all countries with high security concerns.

In September 2014 Indian Prime Minister Narendra Modi announced that the United States would be added to the list of countries whose citizens may obtain a visa on arrival. However, in October 2014 the planned introduction of the new e-Visa system was pushed from 2 October 2014 to June 2015. It was also revealed that the list of visa on arrival countries was unlikely to be expanded in 2014.

In November 2014 it was announced that the e-visa system might be rolled out for about 25 countries including the 13 countries that were already eligible for visa on arrival. Later that month it was announced that 28 countries would become eligible for an electronic visa on 27 November 2014 and that the list would include visa on arrival eligible countries as well as Brazil, Germany, Israel, Jordan, Mauritius, Norway, Palestine, Russia, Thailand, Ukraine, United Arab Emirates, United States.

In November 2014, the Indian Prime Minister announced visa on arrival facility for nationals of all Pacific countries and Australia.

=== 2015 ===
The manual processing of the visa on arrival was discontinued in January 2015. Until 26 January 2015, citizens of the following countries holding ordinary passports were granted visa on arrival without obtaining an ETA (unless they were of Pakistani origin), for a single stay up to 30 days in India when traveling as a tourist or for visiting family or friends:

- Cambodia
- Finland
- Indonesia
- Japan
- Laos
- Luxembourg
- Myanmar
- New Zealand
- Philippines
- Singapore
- South Korea
- Vietnam

In February 2015, the Ministry of Tourism proposed extending the facility to citizens of China, United Kingdom, Spain, France, Italy and Malaysia. Subsequently, the Minister of Finance announced that the facility would be extended, in stages, to citizens of 150 countries. In March 2015 it was announced that 53 nations were shortlisted for the second round of expansion of the system based on the number of tourist arrivals in the previous years.

After the Government was criticised for naming the new policy "Visa on arrival" it decided to rename it to "e-Tourist Visa (eTV)" in April 2015.

The e-Tourist Visa facility was extended to 31 new countries on 1 May 2015.

In May 2015, Indian Foreign Ministry announced that Chinese citizens would be able to apply for e-Tourist Visa facility in order to coordinate Prime Minister Narendra Modi visiting China between 14 and 16 May. Disputes about the Sino-Indian border and national security would be postponed.

On 29 July 2015, the Indian Ministry of Home Affairs announced the extension of e-Tourist Visa facility to nationals of China, including Hong Kong and Macau, with effect from 30 July 2015.

The list of eligible nationalities was extended with 36 new countries on 15 August 2015. On the same day the list of eTV airports was expanded with 7 new airports. The extension to 150 nationalities was scheduled to be finished by 31 March 2016.

In September 2015 it was announced that the list would be expanded by another 37 countries.

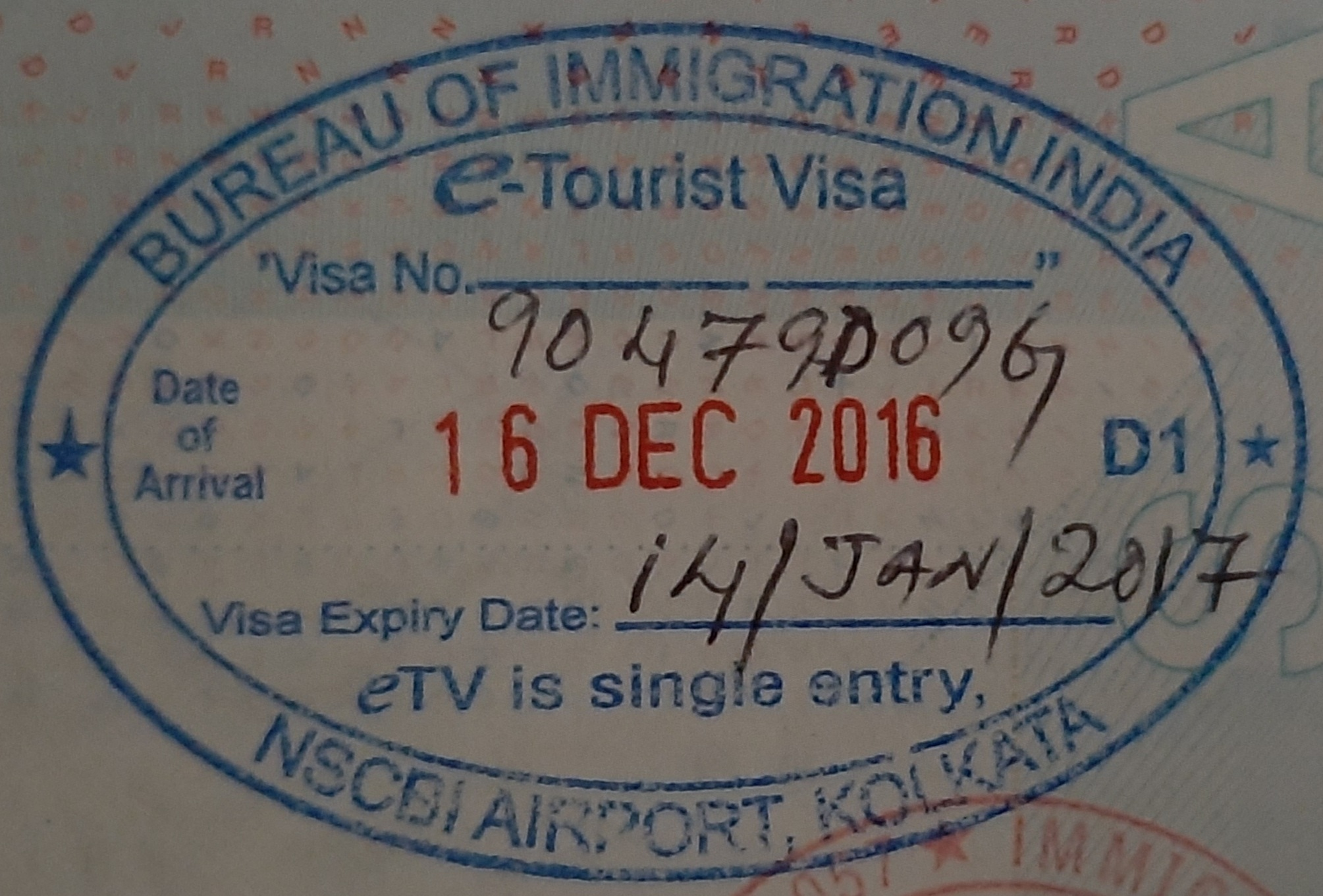
Entry stamp for holder of an Indian e-Tourist Visa

=== 2016 ===
In January 2016 it was announced that the extension would take place by March 2016. In November 2015 it was announced that the visa validity would be extended to 180 days.

In January 2016 it was announced that the multiple entries would become available and that e-Tourist Visa holders would receive a gift pack on arrival.

The eTV list was extended for tourists from 37 more countries on 26 February 2016.

In September 2016 it was announced that the electronic visa scheme would be reformed to include 27 visa codes denoting various visit purposes such as tourism, business or medical visits. It was also announced that the list of visa on arrival eligible countries would be expanded.

On 30 November 2016 the Government of India approved further liberalization, simplification and rationalization of visa regime in India. It also announced that more countries would be added to the e-visa list. The e-visa would have a validity of 60 days and could be applied for by foreign nationals up to four months ahead of the visit. Five seaports – Mumbai, Kochi, Chennai, Goa and Mangaluru – would receive tourists coming with e-visa.

=== 2017 ===
From 1 April 2017 e-visas are granted under three categories of tourist, business and medical. The window for application under e-visa scheme was increased from 30 days to 120 days, and duration of stay on e-visa was increased from 30 days to 60 days, with double entry on e-tourist and e-business visa, and triple entry on e-medical visa. The list of eligible nationalities was also further expanded with 11 new countries, and the list of arrival ports was increased from 16 to 24 airports and 3 seaports.

In July 2017 Uganda was added to the list of e-Visa eligible countries.

=== 2018 ===
During 2018, Iran, Kazakhstan, Kyrgyzstan and Qatar were added to the list of e-Visa eligible countries.

=== 2019 ===
In January 2019 the Indian government updated e-Visa rules for all eligible countries. The validity of Indian e-tourist and e-Business Visa was increased from 60 days with double entry to up-to 1 year with multiple entries. The validity count starts from the day of being granted the e-visa online and not from the day of physical entry as before.

For e-tourist visa, continuous stay during each visit shall not exceed 180 days for nationals of Canada, Japan, United Kingdom and United States, or 90 days for nationals of other eligible countries. No FRRO (Foreigners Regional Registration Officer) registration is required.

For e-business visa, continuous stay during each visit should not exceed 180 days for nationals of all eligible countries, and no FRRO (Foreigners Regional Registration Officer) registration is required if the stay is for less than 180 days.

During 2019, Saudi Arabia, Belarus and Benin were added to the list of e-Visa eligible countries.

In August 2019, Indian Government announced a 30 Day Visa during the peak season for 25 Dollars.

=== 2020 ===
During 2020, Equatorial Guinea and Togo were added to the list of e-Visa eligible countries.

=== 2021 ===
In April 2021, Canada, the United Kingdom and 13 Asian countries and territories were removed from the e-Visa facility.

In August 2021, the category of emergency e-Visa was introduced for nationals of Afghanistan.

=== 2022 ===
In 2022, the Indian government announced plans to introduce an Ayush visa for those coming to India for traditional medicine.

In December 2022, the e-Visa facility was resumed for nationals of Canada, the United Kingdom and seven Asian countries that had been removed in 2021.

=== 2023 ===
In March 2023, the e-Visa facility was resumed for nationals of Saudi Arabia, which had been removed in 2021.

The e-visa facility was suspended for nationals of Canada from 21 September to 22 November 2023.

In December 2023, the e-Visa facility was extended to British nationals from Gibraltar, Guernsey, Isle of Man and Jersey.

=== 2024 ===
In January 2024, the e-Visa facility was extended to nationals of Morocco.

In June 2024, medical and attendant e-Visas were extended to nationals of Bangladesh, but were removed later in the same year.

In August 2024, business e-Visa was resumed for nationals of China, including Hong Kong and Macau, which had been removed in 2021.

=== 2025 ===
In January 2025, e-Visa categories were added for students and their dependents.

In February 2025, the e-Visa facility was resumed for nationals of Qatar, which had been removed in 2021.

In April 2025, the emergency e-Visa was replaced by a separate module with six categories of electronic visas for nationals of Afghanistan.

In July 2025, the e-Visa facility was extended to nationals of Bahrain, Kuwait and Mauritania.

In November 2025, e-Visa categories were added for transit, mountaineering, film, and entry (people of Indian origin and their spouses).

In December 2025, Minister of Culture and Tourism Gajendra Singh Shekhawat announced plans to expand the visa-on-arrival facility to nationals of more countries based on reciprocity, and to simplify the e-Visa application.

In December 2025, an e-Visa category was added for production investment. This category also replaced the business e-Visa for nationals of China, including Hong Kong and Macau.

=== 2026 ===
Due to the 2026 Ebola epidemic, the e-Visa facility was suspended for nationals of Uganda from June to September 2026. In November 2026, the Government of India announced reforms to its visa framework, reducing the number of main visa categories from 13 to 9 and sub-categories from 49 to 23, while simplifying application requirements by approximately 65–70%. The reforms aim to facilitate international travel for tourism, healthcare, education and business through a more streamlined visa system.

== Costs of visa applications ==
Visa applications can be submitted in person or sent by post to an Indian consulate. It can also be submitted to designated visa service provider in certain countries. Costs differ per consulate and region. Some visa-handling services charge a small fee in addition, to check that completed application form meets all requirements and submit the documents on the applicant's behalf.

== Restricted and protected area permits ==
A Protected Area Permit (PAP) is required to enter the states of Arunachal Pradesh and Sikkim and some parts of the states of Himachal Pradesh, Jammu and Kashmir, Rajasthan and Uttarakhand. A Restricted Area Permit (RAP) is required to enter the Andaman and Nicobar Islands and parts of Sikkim. Some of these requirements are occasionally lifted for a year at a time. Permits are not required for nationals of Bhutan travelling by air to/from Thimphu via Bagdogra and for nationals of Nepal travelling by air to/from Kathmandu (if travelling by land a pass issued by either the Foreigners Regional Registration Office, Superintendent of police or the diplomatic representation of India in Bhutan or Nepal is required). Special permits are needed to enter Lakshadweep Islands. Maldivian citizens are allowed to visit Minicoy island for fifteen days if allowed by the High Commissioner of India to the Maldives.

== Pakistani passport holders and persons of Pakistani origin ==
Any person who has ever held Pakistani citizenship, or who has a parent or a spouse that has held Pakistani citizenship are ineligible for e-Visas, and therefore must apply to their local Indian mission for visas. Applicants who once held Pakistani citizenship require lengthy processing times, while foreign spouses and those of Pakistani origin who never held Pakistani citizenship typically experience shorter processing times. India also forbids Pakistani applicants with dual nationality from applying on their non-Pakistani passport. As of April 2025, India has cancelled visas allotted to Pakistani citizens with visa issuance suspended indefinitely.

=== Visa on arrival for persons over 65 years of age ===
As of 31 March 2013, Pakistani citizens over the age of 65 with the sole objective of meeting friends or family are granted a 45-day visa upon arrival at the Attari-Wagah Checkpoint, so long as the applicant provides a sponsorship certificate from their contacts in India attesting that they will be responsible for the visit of their Pakistani friend or relative, and which must also be countersigned by a DM, SP, SDM, Tehsildar, BDO, SHO, Groups A officer of State and Central Government, or principal/headmaster of a government college or government school who attest that they personally know the sponsor. This scheme does not apply to those who wish to visit Punjab, Kerala and Restricted Areas, nor does it apply to those who have ever been denied an Indian visa before.

== Visa types ==
Sl. No	Type of visa	Period for which granted	Entry Single (S), Multiple (M), Double (D)	Documents required with application	Extendable in India
1	Tourist	up to 5 years	S/M		No
2	Transit	15 days	S/D	Return/onward journey ticket	No
3	Business	5 years	M	Documents to prove bona fide purpose (company letter, etc.)	Yes
4	Employment	1 year / period of contract	M	Proof of employment (appointment document), terms and conditions	Yes
5	Student	Period of course / 5 years	M	Proof of admission in Indian institution	Yes
6	Foreigners of Indian origin	5 years	M	Proof of being of Indian origin	Yes
7	Intern	Duration of the internship or one year, whichever is less	S/D/M	Letter from the Indian company/educational institution/NGO concerned sponsoring the foreign national for internship programme clearly indicating the period of internship.	Non-extendable.(Registration required within 14 days of arrival with concerned FRO)
8	Film	Duration of the shooting of the film as per schedule submitted or one year, whichever is less	S/D/M	Copy of detailed shooting script in case of feature film and detailed concept in case of TV show/serial; Details of visiting film crew and location of film shooting.; Letter of intent regarding the shooting of the film in India mentioning the production schedule, particulars of the cast and crew coming to India for the purpose of shoot, chosen location, list of film equipment and other relevant details.	Yes

- If visa is for more than 180 days, registration is compulsory within 14 days of arrival in India.

Requirement of Identification Papers to Establish Their Identity as Nepalese or Indian for Persons Entering India or Nepal from Either Country by Air

Instructions have been issued whereby Nepalese and Indian citizens, while travelling by air, between the two countries must be in possession of any of the following documents to prove their nationality:

- Valid national passport
- Valid photo identity card issued by the Government of India / State Government or UT Administration / Election Commission of India
- Emergency certificate issued by the Embassy of India, Kathmandu to Indians and by the Embassy of Nepal in Delhi in respect of Nepalese citizens

== Visitor statistics ==
Most visitors arriving in India were from the following countries of nationality:

Raw data

Country	2022	2021	2020	2019	2018	2017
United States	1,403,399	429,860	394,092	1,512,032	1,456,678	1,376,919
Bangladesh	1,277,557	240,554	549,273	2,577,727	2,256,675	2,156,557
United Kingdom	641,051	164,143	291,874	1,000,292	1,029,757	986,296
Australia	376,898	33,864	86,758	367,241	346,486	324,243
Canada	289,259	80,437	122,868	351,859	351,040	335,439
Sri Lanka	183,459	25,989	68,646	330,861	353,684	303,590
Germany	141,425	33,772	72,558	264,973	274,087	269,380
Nepal	138,203	52,544	40,822	164,040	174,096	164,018
Singapore	132,668	13,407	33,747	190,089	183,581	175,852
Malaysia	126,192	6,628	69,897	334,579	319,172	322,126
France	120,282	30,374	74,243	247,238	261,653	249,620
Russia	97,911	17,567	102,166	251,319	262,309	278,904
Maldives	71,707	26,571	14,536	78,587	62,337	66,150
Portugal	69,522	32,064	31,005	74,743	74,492	66,378
Japan	64,196	15,358	48,191	238,903	236,236	222,527
Italy	62,226	13,659	31,186	128,572	126,931	111,915
Oman	56,474	10,174	15,430	74,564	95,160	107,216
Netherlands	55,019	15,631	26,258	80,313	81,615	76,652
New Zealand	54,974	4,497	16,653	65,551	60,664	56,597
Thailand	54,367	4,668	52,626	169,956	166,293	140,087
South Korea	49,423	13,330	32,302	149,445	150,536	142,383
United Arab Emirates	43,702	3,927	7,387	55,413	59,971	67,238
Spain	39,658	6,982	16,335	83,322	84,356	81,442
Vietnam	37,232	1,104	8,828	33,636	31,427	23,771
Israel	36,418	4,601	17,444	73,137	67,366	58,131
Iraq	36,277	16,213	17,823	61,907	68,462	56,230
Kenya	35,743	13,373	12,779	48,639	48,845	46,011
Ireland	30,959	7,600	9,708	41,183	39,276	37,993
Philippines	28,379	6,927	16,052	56,393	53,473	53,963
South Africa	25,860	3,820	12,561	57,274	58,613	57,060
Switzerland	25,255	4,198	12,675	46,826	49,322	49,607
Sudan	24,930	6,781	9,114	34,003	34,712	22,762
Mauritius	24,743	2,118	11,410	46,814	42,096	37,706
Belgium	24,172	7,382	11,022	39,263	44,086	41,092
Sweden	22,372	5,579	11,992	42,318	46,743	45,851
Bhutan	20,772	6,081	7,901	28,178	26,470	25,267
Yemen	19,022	6,235	5,882	26,065	21,674	21,695
Turkey	18,996	3,710	10,853	35,113	33,825	33,251
Tanzania	18,581	6,480	6,501	23,774	23,443	22,261
Saudi Arabia	18,513	1,088	10,423	48,526	47,546	52,976
Austria	18,375	4,411	9,182	32,332	33,200	31,842
Poland	18,025	2,461	12,161	33,687	31,555	28,674
Pakistan	16,637	8,163	14,232	39,018	41,659	44,266
Myanmar	15,963	3,013	35,291	86,842	75,773	56,952
Indonesia	13,961	2,105	11,975	50,177	46,867	43,973
Norway	13,449	2,790	6,224	21,898	22,631	20,882
Iran	13,064	2,369	7,090	33,288	35,596	42,641
Denmark	12,331	2,025	8,252	26,492	28,195	26,761
Brazil	12,301	2,055	8,092	25,422	26,579	24,453
China	11,762	3,502	39,586	339,442	281,768	247,235
Nigeria	10,072	5,516	3,819	14,033	12,067	12,651
Bahrain	9,959	1,727	3,429	15,128	13,915	16,764
Egypt	9,612	1,739	4,886	21,538	20,486	20,528
Kazakhstan	9,546	2,378	5,918	15,709	13,314	15,421
Mexico	8,915	859	4,580	20,766	19,909	18,114
Finland	8,781	1,329	4,310	18,945	21,239	20,384
Ukraine	7,304	5,197	10,619	29,468	26,260	25,988
Czech Republic	6,287	983	3,607	13,290	13,413	11,852
Hungary	4,298	653	2,964	9,788	9,201	9,241
Greece	4,988	1,144	2,854	10,317	10,656	10,286
Argentina	4,720	530	4,294	12,844	16,345	14,875
Afghanistan	1,617	36,451	47,561	124,120	153,905	149,176
Total	6,437,467	1,527,114	2,744,766	10,930,355	10,557,976	10,035,803

In 2017 most e-Visas were issued to the following countries of nationality:

Nationality	Issued e-Visas in 2017	Share
United Kingdom	305,954	18%
United States	202,508	11.9%
France	93,964	5.5%
China	91,509	5.4%
Russia	88,604	5.2%
Germany	76,295	4.5%
Australia	72,647	4.3%
Canada	64,289	3.8%
South Korea	47,805	2.8%
Spain	40,896	2.4%
Singapore	34,690	2.0%
UAE	34,134	2.0%
Oman	32,702	1.9%
Thailand	32,179	1.9%
South Africa	30,201	1.8%
Others	448,798	26.4%
Total	1,697,175	100.0%

== See also ==
- Visa requirements for Indian citizens
- Tourism in India
