= Overseas Citizenship of India =

Category of Indian nationality law

- Front cover of an OCI card issued on or after 15 April 2021
- First issued: 9 January 2006; 20 years ago (first version); 9 January 2015 (second version); 15 April 2021 (current version)
- Purpose: Visa, Identification, permanent residency
- Eligibility: see eligibility
- Cost: ₹15000 (In India); US $275 (abroad); Renewal ₹1400 (In India); Renewal US $25 (abroad)

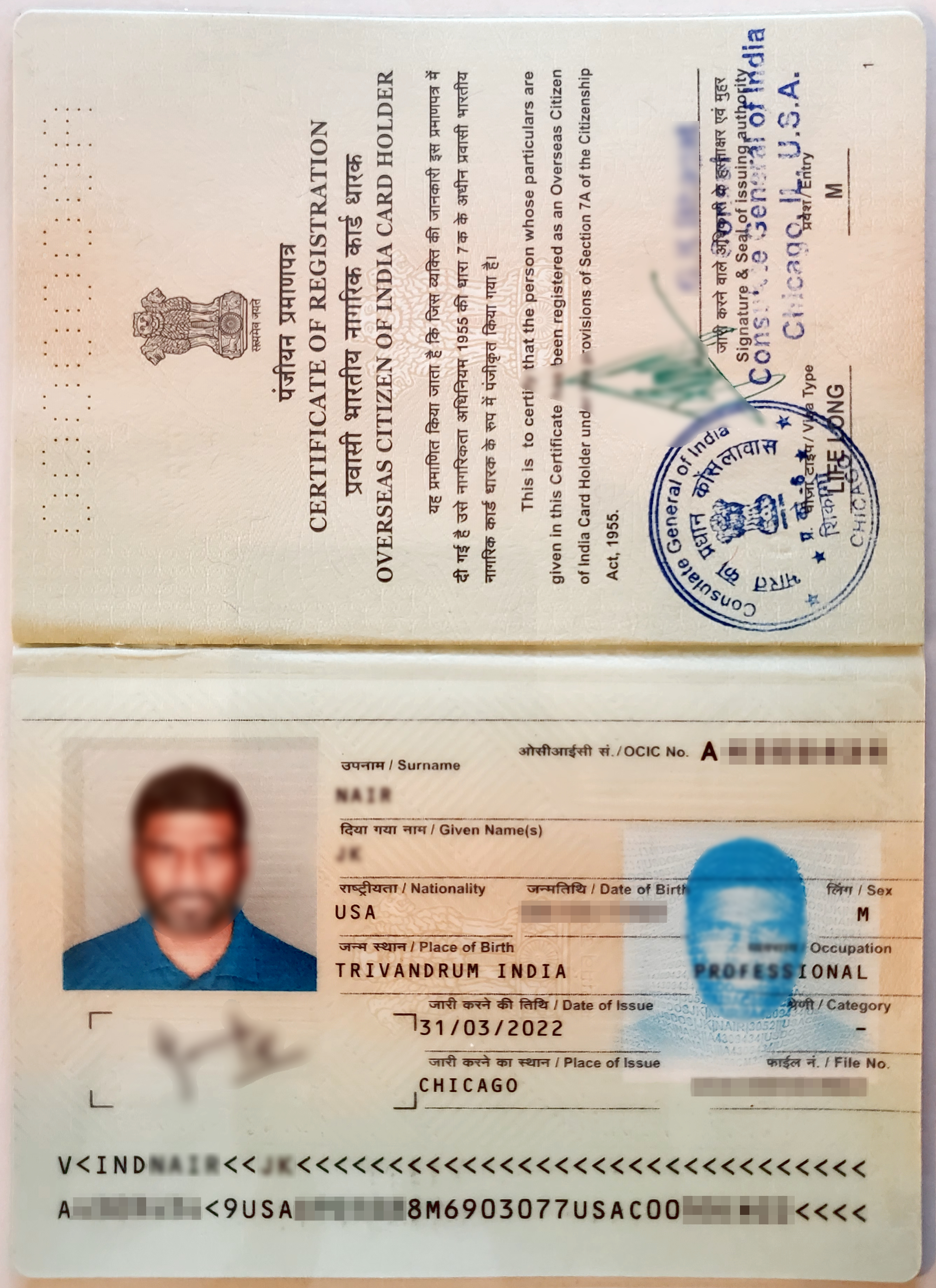
Data page of an OCI card issued on or after 9 January 2015

Overseas Citizenship of India (OCI) is a form of permanent residency available to people of Indian origin which allows them to live and work in India indefinitely. It allows the cardholders a lifetime entry to the country along with benefits such as being able to own real estate and make other investments in the country.

Despite its name, OCI is not recognised as citizenship by the Republic of India or by the vast majority of nations worldwide, and it does not grant the right to vote in Indian elections or hold public office. The Indian government can revoke OCI status in a wide variety of circumstances. In addition, the OCI card is only valid with a valid foreign passport. As of 2022, there are 4 million holders of OCI cards among the Indian diaspora.

The OCI scheme was introduced by The Citizenship (Amendment) Act, 2003 in response to demands for dual citizenship by the Indian diaspora. It provides overseas citizens with many of the rights available to resident citizens.

OCI status is not available to anyone who has ever been a Pakistani or Bangladeshi citizen, or who is a child, grandchild, or great-grandchild of such a person.

== History ==
The Constitution of India does not permit dual citizenship (under Article 9). Indian authorities have interpreted the law to mean that a person cannot have a second country's passport simultaneously with an Indian one — even in the case of a child who is claimed by another country as a citizen of that country, and who may be required by the laws of the other country to use one of its passports for foreign travel (such as a child born in the United States or Canada to Indian parents), and the Indian courts have given the executive branch wide discretion over this matter.

On the recommendations of a High-Level Committee on Indian Diaspora, the Government of India decided to register Persons of Indian Origin (PIOs) of a certain category, as has been specified in the Section 7A of the Citizenship Act, 1955, as Overseas Citizenship of India (OCI) holders, by the Citizenship (Amendment) Act, 2003.

The OCI program was launched during the Pravasi Bharatiya Divas convention held in Hyderabad on 9 January 2006.

Before 9 January 2015, travelers holding an OCI card were required to carry a passport that contained the lifelong "U" visa stamp while traveling to India. This requirement was done away with that day and OCI holders no longer require the lifetime visa stamp passport. The OCI card (the blue-grey booklet) in conjunction with a valid foreign passport is sufficient to travel to and from India.

In March 2020, visa-free travel granted to OCI holders was put on hold until 15 April due to the coronavirus pandemic.

On 4 March 2021, the rights of OCI holders were slightly curtailed. To engage in certain activities or visit certain areas in India, OCI holders now require a Protected Area Permit, a requirement for PIO holders which OCI never had since its launch in 2006. Also, OCI holders living in India need to register with the Foreigners Regional Registration Officer (FRRO) via email upon every change of their permanent home address or occupation.

On 15 April 2021, the number of times OCI needs to be renewed was reduced to one, when the passport is renewed for the first time after age 20. However, every time the passport is renewed before age 20 and when the passport is renewed for the first time after age 50, a copy of the current passport along with the current passport-sized photo needs to be uploaded onto the OCI online portal. These relaxed OCI renewal guidelines reduce the administrative burden caused by multiple OCI renewals.

=== Comparison ===
Comparison of Resident Indians, NRIs, PIOs, and OCIs
Category	Indian passport (Indian Citizen)	Resident in India	Expatriate	Tax status	OCI card	Acts	Notes
Indian (resident)	Yes	Yes	No	Yes	No	Indian nationality law Passports Act	
Non-resident Indian (NRI)	Yes	No	Yes (of India)	No	No	Indian nationality law Passports Act; IT Act, 1961	
Person of Indian Origin (PIO)^{1} / Overseas Citizen of India (OCI)^{2}	No	Yes (in India), else No	No (in India), else Yes	Yes (in India), else No	Yes	Cit. (A) Act, 2003 (Section 7A–D)	lifetime visa / permanent residency

PIOs and OCIs
Foreign national	OCI card is eligible	Exception	Acts	Status after attaining OCI
Person of Indian Origin (PIO)	Yes	–	–	PIO OCI
Others	No	Yes, if married to Indian citizen or PIO for more than two years	Cit. (A) Act, 2003 (Section 7A(d))	Non-PIO OCI

Notes:

1. People of Indian Origin (PIO) refers to people of Indian birth or ancestry who are not citizens of India, but are citizens of other nations. Those PIOs who have availed of the Overseas Citizenship of India status through the OCI card are known as Overseas Citizens of India (OCI). The card issued to PIOs earlier known as the PIO card has been merged into the OCI card since 2015.
2. Overseas Citizens of India can include both PIO OCIs and non-PIO OCIs. Additionally, foreign nationals who marry Indian citizens can also avail of the OCI card and become OCI, thus non-PIO OCIs are excluded here since they are not part of the Indian diaspora.

== Eligibility ==
The Government of India, on application, may register as an Overseas Citizen of India, any person who:

- is a citizen of another country, but was a citizen of India on 26 January 1950 or at any time thereafter; or
- is a citizen of another country, but belonged to a territory that became part of India after 15 August 1947; or
- is a citizen of another country, but was eligible to become a citizen of India on 26 January 1950; or
- is a child or a grandchild or a great-grandchild of such a citizen; or
- is a minor child of such persons mentioned above; or
- is a minor child and both of whose parents are citizens of India or one of the parents is a citizen of India; or
- is a spouse of foreign origin of a citizen of India or spouse of foreign origin of an Overseas Citizen of India holder registered under section 7A of the Citizenship Act 1955 and whose marriage has been registered and subsisted for a continuous period of not less than two years immediately preceding the presentation of the application.

A person, who or either of whose parents or grandparents or great grandparents is or had been a citizen of Pakistan or Bangladesh, is ineligible for registration as an Overseas Citizen of India.

A person who has served as a member of any foreign military, including that of his home country, is ineligible to receive an OCI card, except when bound by their home country to serve under their local law.

Dutch nationals of Surinamese origin up to the sixth generation whose forefathers came from India in the 19th century are eligible to apply for an OCI card.

OCI holders eligible through marriage lose their OCI status upon divorce.

=== Revoking the OCI card ===
Previously, the government could cancel the OCI status of people who obtained it by fraud, showed acts of unpatriotism, or broke a law punishable with at least two years of jail time before five years of having issued OCI. The Citizenship (Amendment) Act, 2019 gives the government additional power to cancel the OCI status of people who violate any local law, regardless of either whether it a petty infraction or a heinous felony or whether it was committed by a juvenile or an adult. The new act makes the rules much more strict for OCI holders in an attempt to preserve OCI's dignity, however, it also has a provision that gives the person whose OCI status is at stake the right to be heard by the government before they come to a verdict.

In 2021, the OCI cards of several Canadian cardholders were reportedly revoked by the Indian Government for participating in "anti-India" activities which included extending support to the protests by farmers against controversial farm laws in India.

=== Renunciation of the OCI card ===
An OCI cardholder can renounce their OCI status by submitting a completed renunciation declaration form to the Central Government. After the renunciation of the status, every minor child of that person also loses their OCI status.

== Application ==
Applications for OCI can only be made online at ociservices.gov.in. A person making an application is required to submit a photograph and several identification documents to prove they meet the eligibility criteria and also must pay an application fee. Applications made from outside India are charged a fee of US$275. Applications submitted in India are charged a fee of ₹15,000 (US$160).

The applicant must provide proof of their current citizenship by presenting a copy of their current passport that has a validity of at least 6 months from the time of application. If the applicant is making their application while within Indian jurisdiction, they must submit a copy of any type of Indian visa (other than a missionary and mountaineering visa), or a residential permit with at least 3 months' validity. Applicants must provide evidence that either they or their parents grandparents or great-grandparents meet the eligibility criteria described above. This can be done by presenting a copy of an Indian passport, a copy of the Domicile Certificate issued by the competent authority, a copy of the Nativity Certificate from the competent authority, or an OCI/PIO card of parents or spouse along with the base papers/documents upon which the OCI/PIO card was issued. Applicants may also submit any other evidence that may substantiate their claim. Usually, applicants can submit a certificate of residence or place of birth of self/parents/grandparents from the First Class Magistrate/District Magistrate (DM) of the concerned place.

If the applicant cites their Indian origin as a basis for registration as an OCI holder, they must provide evidence of their relationship with the person cited as parent/grandparent/great-grandparent. The document of relationship could be a birth certificate issued from a competent authority mentioning both parents' names. In case the birth certificate is issued by a foreign authority, it must be apostilled or endorsed by the concerned Indian diplomatic mission abroad. In the case of a minor child whose parents are both Indian citizens or who has at least one parent holding Indian citizenship, evidence may comprise a copy of the child's birth certificate that mentions its parents, a copy of Indian passport of at least one of the parents or copy of the Domicile Certificate or Nativity Certificate issued by a Competent Authority supporting the Indian origin of at least one parent or any other proof substantiating the status of at least one parent as being either an Indian citizen or being of Indian origin. If the parents are divorced, a court order of dissolution of marriage which specifically mentions that the legal custody of the child is with the parent who is applying for the OCI card must be submitted.

Evidence as spouse of foreign origin of a citizen of India or spouse of foreign origin of an OCI holder may be provided in the form of a registered marriage certificate. In the case of the spouse of an Indian citizen, a copy of the Indian passport of the spouse or copy of the Domicile Certificate or Nativity Certificate issued by the Competent Authority in respect of the Indian spouse or any other proof substantiating the status of the spouse as being an Indian citizen. In the case of the spouse of an OCI holder, a copy of the present valid passport of the spouse, and copy of the OCI card of the spouse, and copies of the documents upon which the OCI card was issued to the spouse.

== OCI re-issuance advisory upon getting a new passport ==
- For an applicant who is 19 years of age or younger, a copy of the current passport and current passport-sized photo must be re-uploaded onto the OCI online portal every time a new passport is issued. There is no need to re-issue OCI. Uploading documents will be provided on gratis basis to the OCI holders.
- For an applicant who is 20 to 49 years of age, OCI must be re-issued the first time a new passport is issued after age 20.
- For an applicant who is 50 years of age or older, a copy of the current passport and current passport-sized photo must be re-uploaded onto the OCI online portal the first time a new passport is issued after age 50. There is no need to re-issue OCI. Uploading documents will be provided on gratis basis to the OCI holders.

== Privileges and restrictions ==
Overseas Citizenship of India allows a holder:

1. Multiple entry, multi-purpose lifelong visa-free visits to India.
2. Exemption from registering with the Foreigners Regional Registration Officer (FRRO) of India on their arrival in the country or for any length of stay in India, unless there is a change of permanent home address or occupation.
3. Parity with Indian citizens for domestic airfares and admission fees for national parks, wildlife sanctuaries, national monuments, historical sites, and museums.
4. Parity with NRIs for most economic, financial, and educational fields, except in the acquisition of agricultural or plantation properties.
5. Parity with foreign nationals for any other field not mentioned in 3 and 4.
6. Visits to India for the purpose of conducting research after obtaining a No Objection/Research Project Clearance Certificate from Ministry of Home Affairs (MHA), India and that can be applied at nearest Indian Diplomatic Mission. This includes Scholars awarded Scholarship under Fulbright or any other scheme.

OCI holders are not citizens of India from a constitutional point of view and will not enjoy the following rights even if residing in India:

- they do not have the right to vote.
- they do not have the right to hold the offices of Prime Minister, President, Vice President, Chief Minister, Governor, Judge of Supreme Court and High Court, member of Lok Sabha, Rajya Sabha, Legislative Assembly, or Council.
- they do not have the right to any public services (government jobs).
- they do not have the right to invest in farmland (agricultural property). However, they can still inherit farmland.
- they are not eligible for an Inner Line Permit. Overseas Citizens of India need to apply for a Protected Area Permit to perform certain activities and visit certain areas in India.

Though not actual dual citizenship, the privileges afforded by acquiring an OCI card are now such that multi-national companies are finding it simpler to hire OCI holders, who enjoy a multiple entry, multi-purpose lifelong visa to visit and reside in India, sparing them the need for permits. OCI holders are treated on par with NRIs for most economic, financial, and educational matters and lack only political rights and rights to buy agricultural or plantation properties.

Since they are exempted from registration with the Foreigners Regional Registration Officer (FRRO) on their arrival in the country and can stay or live in India for as long as they wish, OCI holders can travel at very short notice and take up assignments in India, while others could get caught up in bureaucratic delays over their employment visa. So many companies are following an active policy of moving OCI holders to India for business expansion. Indian missions overseas are witnessing a deluge in OCI applications, the number of OCI cards issued by diplomatic missions around the world has been steadily rising, with several Indian diplomatic missions grappling with a huge backlog of applications. However, starting from 4 March 2021, OCI holders living in India need to register with the FRRO upon every change of their permanent home address or occupation.

OCI holders must always possess a valid foreign passport throughout their stay in India. In the event of the expiry of an international passport during their stay in India, the OCI holder need to apply for legalisation/registration at FRRO, which involves a penalty up to ₹20,000.

Research on the effects of Overseas Citizenship in India shows three effects:

(a) It enables overseas citizens by granting special privileges.

(b) It affects expectations about privileges.

(c) It eases the transaction process and reduces actual and expected costs and risks through exemptions from formal requirements and by serving as official proof of entitlement.

Privileges of OCI holders depend on the government policy of the day, and there are instances where they are denied additional rights and conveniences afforded to full Indian citizens including citizen NRIs:

- During the 2016 Indian banknote demonetisation where non-citizens, including OCI holders, were denied rights to bring rupee notes back into the country contrary to initial indications.
- OCI holders are sometimes prevented from obtaining admission seats at colleges. In one case, this restriction has been overturned by a state high court.
- During the COVID-19 pandemic in 2020, OCI holders faced additional travel restrictions, particularly when traveling to India.

== Overseas recognition ==
Most overseas countries such as the United States do not recognize the OCI as citizenship of another country. There are, however, some exceptions.

=== Stateless persons ===
A stateless person cannot apply for an OCI, however, there is an open question if an OCI holder can be considered stateless (if they lose citizenship of the other country), so in countries where citizenship to dual citizens can be revoked, such as Australia or India, an OCI holder may be disadvantaged, however, the lack of precedents in this area means that the issue is uncertain.

=== United Kingdom ===
In specific circumstances, acquiring Overseas Citizenship of India prevents British Nationals (Overseas) and British Overseas citizens from registering as full British citizens under Section 4B of the British Nationality Act 1981 (which requires that they have no other citizenship in order to register). It does not prevent them from acquiring full British citizenship by a different method and it does not revoke their British citizenship if they have already registered under Section 4B. The UK government considers that, for purposes of the British Nationality Act 1981, "OCI is considered to be citizenship of another State". The circumstance where a person can be in this provision is rare, as it means (a) they hold a secondary form of British nationality such as British Overseas citizenship and a passport, (b) they do not hold any other citizenship, and (c) they have been issued an OCI nevertheless.

The British Home Office has confirmed that the Foreign and Commonwealth Office's perspective on OCI status is that it is not a form of citizenship. As such, people with OCI are still eligible for consular assistance from the FCO whilst in India.

== Documents merged ==
The predecessor to the OCI was the Persons of Indian Origin Card (PIO card). The PIO card was less effective than the OCI, and there was some criticism that holders of the more expensive PIO card were disadvantaged when the OCI scheme was launched barely four years later, that there was confusion about the differences between the two, and administration of the two independent schemes caused complexity and confusion.

Prime minister Narendra Modi announced on 28 September 2014 that PIO and OCI cards would be merged. Ultimately, this was implemented as:

1. A gazetted order published on 30 September 2014 stated a PIO card issued to an applicant shall be valid for their lifetime, provided such applicant has a valid Passport.
2. A gazetted order published on 9 January 2015, converted all PIO holders on that date to OCI,
3. That second order stopped further applications of the PIO card, and
4. Free conversion of PIOs to OCIs was permitted until the extended deadline of 31 December 2017.

PIO holders must apply to convert their existing cards into OCI cards. The Bureau of Immigration stated that it would continue to accept the old PIO cards as valid travel documents until 31 December 2025.

== Physical appearance ==
Front cover of an OCI card issued between 9 January 2006 and 8 January 2015

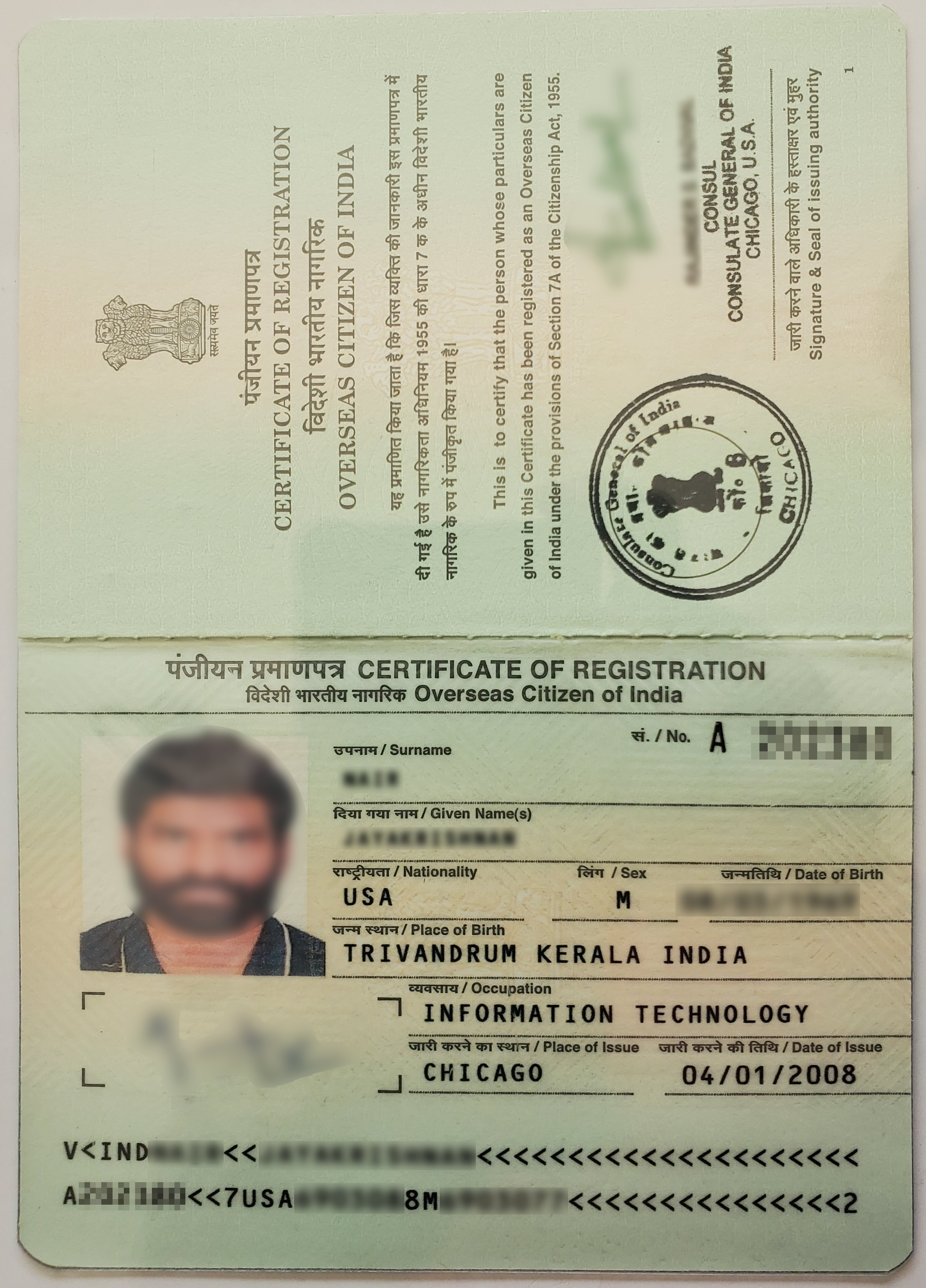
Data page of an OCI card issued between 9 January 2006 and 8 January 2015

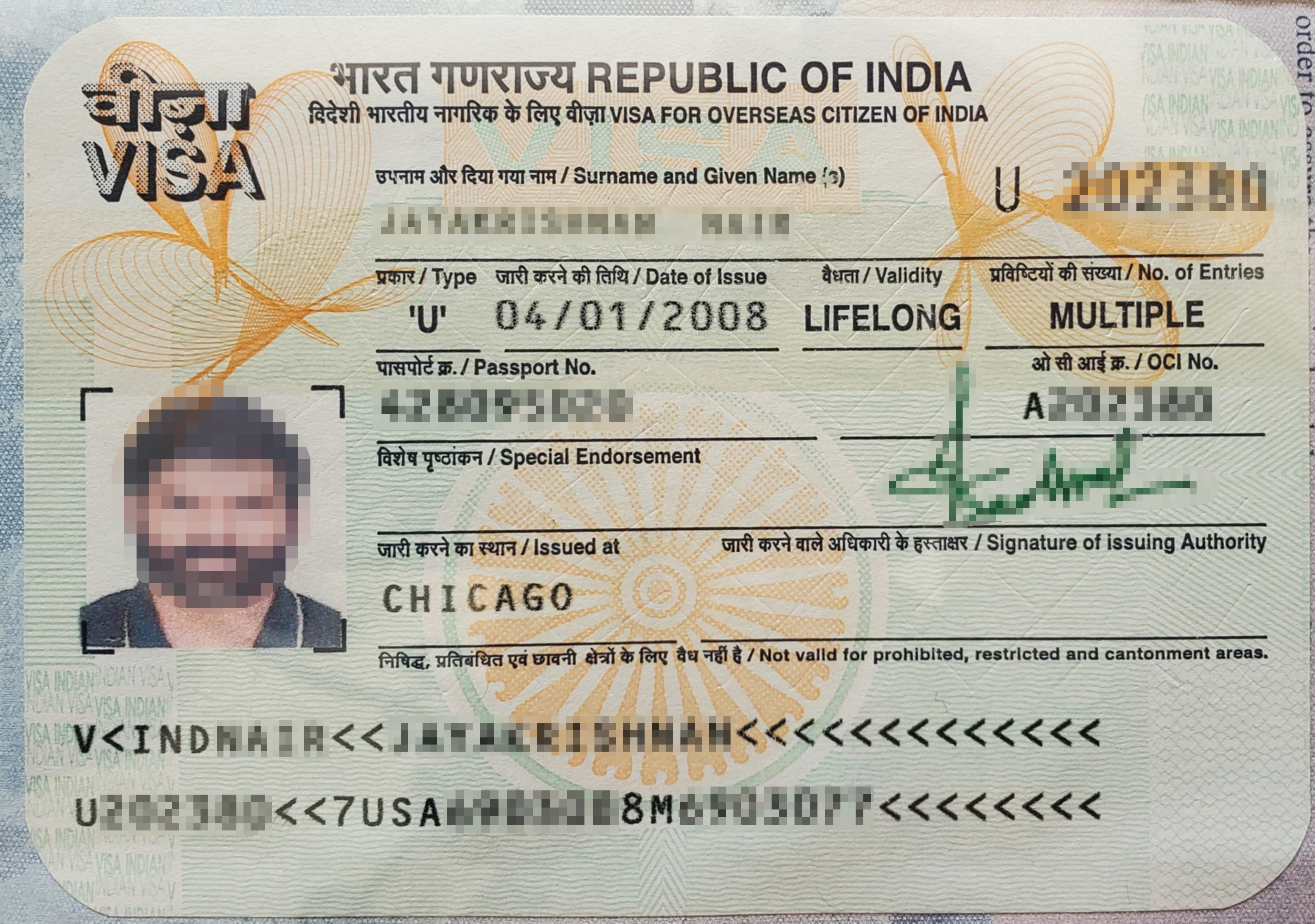
Lifelong "U" visa stamped on the OCI holder's passport (for OCIs issued between 9 January 2006 and 8 January 2015)

The OCI document is a passport-like document, although it is not a passport.

OCI cards issued on or after 15 April 2021 have a blue-grey cover with golden-coloured printing. The Emblem of India is emblazoned in the centre of the front cover. The words "भारत गणराज्य" (Hindi) and "Republic of India" are inscribed above the emblem, and the words "प्रवासी भारतीय नागरिक कार्ड" and "Overseas Citizen of India Card" are inscribed below the emblem.

OCI cards issued between 9 January 2015 and 14 April 2021 are identical to the 15 April 2021 ones, except that the words "प्रवासी भारतीय नागरिक कार्ड" and "Overseas Citizen of India Card" are inscribed above the emblem, and the words "भारत गणराज्य" and "Republic of India" are inscribed below the emblem.

OCI cards issued before 9 January 2015 bore a similar physical appearance as those issued afterward, except the cover was blue instead of blue-grey, the lines inscribed above the Emblem of India were 'Certificate of Registration' and 'Overseas Citizen of India' instead of just 'Overseas Citizen of India Card', and they were printed with a separate lifelong “U” visa stamp (which was pasted on the applicant's passport). The proof of lifelong visa is now just any valid OCI card, with or without the "U" stamp, in conjunction with any valid overseas passport, with or without the "U" stamp, which will be accepted by airlines and Indian customs and police at airport counters when traveling to and from India.

=== OCI contents ===
==== First page (identity) contents ====
- OCI Number
- Surname
- Given name(s)
- Nationality
- Gender
- Date of birth
- Place of birth
- Place of issue
- Occupation
- Date of issue
- Photo of holder
- Signature of the holder
- The information page ends with the Machine Readable Passport Zone (MRZ).

==== Second page contents ====
The OCI certificate contains a note:

This is to certify that the person whose particulars are given in this Certificate has been registered as an Overseas Citizen of India under the provisions of Section 7A of the Citizenship Act, 1955.

The note-bearing page is typically stamped and signed by the issuing authority.

==== Final page contents ====
- Name of father or legal guardian
- Name of mother
- Address
- Passport number
- Date of Issue
- Place of Issue
- Visual distinguishing mark
- File number

== Persons of Indian Origin Card ==
Persons of Indian Origin Card
- Issued by: India
- First issued: 15 September 2002
- Purpose: Identification
- Expiration: 9 January 2015 (merged with OCI)

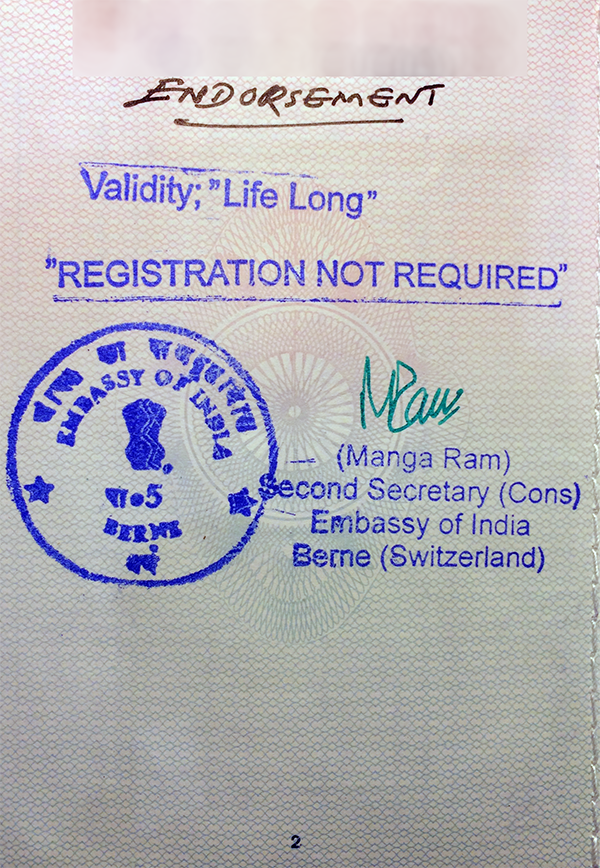
A stamped PIO card making it a de facto OCI card

Persons of Indian Origin Card (PIO Card) was a form of identification issued to a Person of Indian Origin who held a passport in a country other than Afghanistan, Bangladesh, Bhutan, China, Iran, Nepal, Pakistan, and Sri Lanka. Accordingly, the Citizenship (Amendment) Act, 2003, made provision for the acquisition of Overseas Citizenship of India (OCI) by the Persons of Indian Origin (PIOs) of 16 specified countries. It also omitted all provisions recognizing or relating to the commonwealth citizenship from the principle Act. Later, the Citizenship (Amendment) Act, 2005, expanded the scope of grant of OCI for PIOs of all countries except Pakistan, as long as their home country allows dual citizenship under their local law in case it recognizes OCI as a second citizenship of India. The OCI is not a dual citizenship as the Indian constitution forbids dual nationality (Article 9).

On 9 January 2015, the Person of Indian Origin Card scheme was withdrawn by the Government of India and was merged with the Overseas Citizen of India card scheme. All currently held PIO cards are treated as OCI cards. PIO holders will get a special stamp on their existing PIO card, saying "lifelong validity" and "registration not required", thus making them equal to existing OCI cards. An extended deadline was given where the card could be converted for free to an OCI until 31 December 2017. PIO holders can use their PIO card to travel to India until 31 December 2025. Effective 1 January 2026, PIO holders' entry to India will be refused.

=== Conditions ===
The conditions for issuing a PIO card to a person were:

1. Any person who has ever held an Indian passport, or
2. The person's parents, grandparents, or great-grandparents were born in and were permanent residents of India and never moved to (i.e., were never nationals of) Bangladesh and Pakistan, or
3. The person is the spouse of a citizen of India or a PIO and has been so for two years or more, and
4. The person and his/her parents, grandparents, or great-grandparents must not have been a national of Bangladesh or Pakistan at any point in time.

The PIO card program came into effect on 15 September 2002.

=== Uses ===
The various benefits available to PIO holders were:

- Visa-free entry into India during the 15 years of validity of the PIO card.
- Exemption from the requirement of registration if stay in India does not exceed six months. Should the continuous stay exceed six months, registration with the FRRO is required.
- Parity with non-resident Indians in respect of facilities available to the latter in economic, financial, and educational fields.
- All facilities in the matter of acquisition, holding, transfer, and disposal of immovable properties in India except in matters relating to the acquisition of agricultural or plantation properties.
- Facilities available to children of non-resident Indians for getting admission to educational institutions in India, including medical colleges, engineering colleges, Indian Institutes of Technology, Indian Institutes of Management, etc, under the general categories.
- Facilities available under the various housing schemes of LIC, state governments, and other government agencies.

Persons with a PIO were not:

- eligible to vote.
- eligible for an Inner Line Permit. They had to apply for a Protected Area Permit.

=== Registration/Residential Permit ===
Earlier, PIO holders needed to register with the appropriate FRRO if they were planning to stay in India for more than 180 days. This requirement did not apply to minors. However, on 30 September 2014, this requirement was removed.

The FRRO used to issue a "Residential Permit For PIO" which was typically valid till the expiry of the PIO holder's passport. On 28 September 2014, Prime Minister Narendra Modi announced at Madison Square Garden (New York) that PIO holders would be granted lifelong visas. While an Indian citizen can enjoy unlimited visa-free visits to Bhutan and Nepal, this is not possible for a PIO or OCI holder.

== List of notable people with OCI status ==
About 3,772,000 OCI cards have been issued by the Government of India as of March 2021.

=== PIO OCIs ===
Name	Profession	Nationality	References
Akhil Akkineni	Actor	American	
Sunny Leone	Actor	Canadian-American	
Soni Razdan	Actor	British	
Alia Bhatt	Actor	British	
Imran Khan	Actor	American	
Ileana D'Cruz	Actor	Portuguese	
Deepti Naval	Actor	American	
Chetan Kumar	Actor	American	
Pernia Qureshi	Actor	American	
Shibani Dandekar	Actor	Australian	
Tony Fernandes	Businessperson	Malaysian	
Ivan Menezes	Businessperson	British-American	
C. Mohan	Computer Scientist	American	
Muttiah Muralitharan	Cricketer	Sri Lankan	
Monty Panesar	Cricketer	British	
António Costa	Prime Minister of Portugal	Portuguese	
Salma Agha	Actor	British	
Gita Gopinath	IMF Chief Economist	American	
M. F. Husain	Painter	Qatari	
Salman Rushdie	Writer	British-American	
Nitasha Kaul	Writer	British	
Sangita Iyer	Author/Journalist	Canadian	
Tanvie Hans	Footballer	British	
Triman Ranvir	Footballer	Belgian	
Prakash Amritraj	Tennis player	American	
Ankur Poseria	Swimmer	American	
Remo Fernandes	Musician	Portuguese	
Shweta Shetty	Singer	German	
The Great Khali	Wrestler	American	
Chennamaneni Ramesh	Politician	German	
Pravind Jugnauth	Prime Minister of Mauritius	Mauritian	
Barlen Vyapoory	Vice-President of Mauritius	Mauritian	
Anerood Jugnauth	President of Mauritius	Mauritian	
Prithvirajsing Roopun	President of Mauritius	Mauritian	
Dharam Gokhool	President of Mauritius	Mauritian	
Navin Ramgoolam	Prime Minister of Mauritius	Mauritian	
Ira Mathur	Journalist	Trinidad and Tobago	

=== Non-PIO OCIs ===
Name	Profession	Nationality	References
Shaun Tait	Cricketer	Australian	
Stephen Alter	Writer	American	
Kalki Koechlin	Actress	French	
Suzanne Bernert	Actress	German	
Mark Tully	News Reporter	British	

=== Calls for Dual Citizenship ===
The Dual Citizenship for Indians campaign was launched in September 2025 by U.S.-based neonatologist Dr. Munish Kumar Raizada. The campaign advocates for the introduction of dual citizenship for the Indian diaspora through public awareness initiatives and petitions. Its slogan is "Bharat Mera Dil, Do Passport Mera Haq!" ("India is in my heart, two passports are my right!").

== See also ==
- Indian diaspora
