= Koshala Literature Festival =

Annual literary event organized in Uttar Pradesh, India

The Koshala Literature Festival is an annual literary event held in Lucknow, Uttar Pradesh. The event is organised by the Perspective Cultural Society since 2022, and features sessions on literature, music, visual arts, regional history and contemporary social issues. So far, the festival has hosted authors, thinkers, historians, poets, artists and commentators.

== History & Timeline ==
Edition 1

Venue – Sangeet Natak Akademi

The first edition of the festival was a three-day-long event, held at the Sangeet Natak Akademi. The event kicked-off on 4 November 2024 and concluded on 6 November 2024.

Edition 2

Venue - La Martinière College

The second edition of the event was held in 2024, after a gap one year, at the La Martinière College in Lucknow. It was again a three-day-long event, spanning from then 9 February to 11 February 2024.

Edition 3

Venue - Sangeet Natak Akademi

In its third edition, the event returned to its original venue, the Sangeet Natak Akademi. The event was held between 22 November 2024 and 24 November 2024. The third edition was themed "Sanskriti: India’s Cultural Heritage".

Edition 4

Venue - UP Darshan Park

The fourth edition of the event was held at the UP Darshan Park. It was a four-day-long event. Spanning from 27 November to 30 November 2025, the fourth edition was themed "Celebrating Diversity."

== Featured guests ==
=== Season 1 ===
Devdutt Pattanaik, Ashwin Sanghi, Anand Neelakantan, Manish Tewari, Tigmanshu Dhulia, Muzaffar Ali, Shobhaa De, Vidya Shah, Pushpesh Pant, Malini Awasthi, Vikram Sampath, Saeed Naqvi, Sagarika Ghosh, Yatindra Mishra, etc.

=== Season 2 ===
Sathya Saran, Gurcharan Das, John Zubrzycki, Ali Mahmudabad, Sharad Bindal, Himanshu Bajpai, Saurabh Dwivedi, Pushpesh Pant, Tasleema Nasreen, Pankaj Bhadouria, Azhar Iqbal, Ustad Ghulam Siraj Niazi, etc.

=== Season 3 ===
Ira Mukhoty, Eric Chopra, TCA Raghavan, Nilotpal Mrinal, Ila Arun, Saurabh Kirpal, Malavika Rajkotia, Shenaz Treasury, Saurav Jha, Anubhav Sinha, Harshita Gupta, Vishwa Mohan Bhatt, Vikas Swarup, Devapriya Roy, Prayaag Akbar, Shubhra Gupta, Sadhvi Bhagawati Saraswati, Duvvuri Subba Rao, Purushottam Agarwal, Radha Kumar, etc.

=== Season 4 ===
Rajit Kapur, Jyotsna Mohan, Vaibhav Vishal, Anil Rastogi, Ghazala Wahab, Meera Ali, Chugge Khan, Akshat Gupta, Sharad Bindal, Wasim Barelvi, Reena Puri, etc.
