= Marie Borge Refsum =

Norwegian politician (1927–2023)

Marie Borge Refsum (20 March 1927 – 16 February 2023) was a Norwegian politician, who served as a member of the Conservative Party.

Refsum served as a deputy representative to the Norwegian Parliament from Akershus during the term 1973–1977.

On the local level, she was a member of the executive committee of Asker municipal council, having been elected in the so-called "women's coup" where four women (Tove Billington Bye, Berit Ås, Marie Borge Refsum and Kari Bjerke Andreassen) led a successful campaign to get women elected to the municipal council.

Refsum died on 16 February 2023, at the age of 95. Among her grandchildren are the political scientist Francesca R. Jensenius and music technologist Alexander Refsum Jensenius.
