= Kamaladevi Chattopadhyay NIF Book Prize =

Indian non-fiction book prize

- Sponsored by: New India Foundation
- Country: India
- Eligibility: Non-fiction books about contemporary and modern India
- First award: 2018

The Kamaladevi Chattopadhyay NIF Book Prize is awarded annually for non-fiction books on modern or contemporary India which were published in the preceding year. The Prize was established in 2018 by the New India Foundation, a charitable trust that also awards research fellowships and book grants to Indian scholars and writers. Winners of the prize include politician and writer Jairam Ramesh, and historian Ornit Shani, and authors shortlisted for the prize include Aanchal Malhotra, Sujatha Gidla, Katherine Eban, Christophe Jaffrelot, Piers Vitebsky, Alpa Shah, and Manoranjan Byapari.

== Establishment ==
The Kamaladevi Chattopadhyay NIF Book Prize was established by the New India Foundation, a charitable organisation which also awards research fellowships and book grants for Indian writers. Trustees of the foundation include political scientist Niraja Gopal Jayal, businessmen Manish Sabharwal and Nandan Nilekani, historians Ramachandra Guha, and Srinath Raghavan. The foundation provides grants for scholars and writers who are writing non-fiction and fiction books about India, and also provides translation grants for works translated from Indian languages. The Kamaladevi Chattopadhyay NIF Book Prize was established in 2018, to recognise and foster non-fiction writing about India, and is awarded annually for books published in the preceding year. The prize is awarded to authors of any nationality, for books published in any language, and comes with a financial award of ₹15 lakh (equivalent to ₹17 lakh or US$19,000 in 2026). Books which have already been the subject of fellowships awarded by the foundation are ineligible, and the jury is composed of the foundation's trustees.

== See also ==
- Kamaladevi Chattopadhyay

== Recipients ==
Year	Winner	Shortlist	Source
2018	Milan Vaishnav, When Crime Pays: Money and Muscle in Indian Politics (Yale University Press 2017)	Abhinav Chandrachud, The Republic of Rhetoric: Free Speech and the Constitution of India (Penguin India); Aanchal Malhotra, Remnants of a Separation: A History of Partition Through Material Memory (Harper Collins); Anirudh Krishna, The Broken Ladder: The Paradox and Potential of India’s One Billion (Penguin Random House); Sujatha Gidla, Ants Among Elephants: An Untouchable Family and the Making of Modern India (HarperCollins); Francesca R Jensenius, Social Justice Through Inclusion: The Consequences of Electoral Quotas in India (Oxford University Press)	
2019	Ornit Shani, How India Became Democratic: Citizenship and the Making of the Universal Franchise (Penguin Random House India)	Manoranjan Byapari, Interrogating My Chandal Life: An Autobiography Of A Dalit (Sage Publications); Rohit De, A People's Constitution: The Everyday Life of Law in the Indian Republic (Princeton University Press); Snigdha Poonam, Dreamers: How Young Indians Are Changing Their World (Penguin Viking); Alpa Shah, Nightmarch: A Journey into India's Naxal Heartlands (HarperCollins); Piers Vitebsky, Living Without the Dead: Loss and Redemption in a Jungle Cosmos (University of Chicago Press)	
2020	Jointly awarded to: Amit Ahuja, Mobilizing the Marginalized: Ethnic Parties without Ethnic Movements (Oxford University Press); Jairam Ramesh, A Chequered Brilliance: The Many Lives of VK Krishna Menon (Penguin Random House)	Arun Mohan Sukumar,Midnight’s Machines: A Political History of Technology in India (Penguin Random House); Arupjyoti Saikia, The Unquiet River: A Biography of the Brahmaputra (Oxford University Press); Katherine Eban, Bottle of Lies: Ranbaxy and the Dark Side of Indian Pharma (Juggernaut); Stephen Alter, Wild Himalaya: A Natural History of the Greatest Mountain Range on Earth (Aleph Book Company)	
2021	Dinyar Patel, Naoroji: Pioneer of Indian Nationalism (Harvard University Press)	Ashutosh Bhardwaj, The Death Script: Dreams and Delusions in Naxal Country (Fourth Estate, HarperCollins Publishers); Christophe Jaffrelot & Pratinav Anil, India’s First Dictatorship: The Emergency, 1975-77 (HarperCollins Publishers); Sumathi Ramaswamy, Gandhi in the Gallery: The Art of Disobedience (Roli Books); Radhika Singha, The Coolie’s Great War: Indian Labour in a Global Conflict 1914-1921 (HarperCollins Publishers); Vinay Sitapati. Jugalbandi: The BJP Before Modi (Penguin Random House).	
2022	Shekhar Pathak, The Chipko Movement: A People’s History (translated from the Hindi by Manisha Chaudhry, Permanent Black and Ashoka University)	Swethaa S Ballakrishnen, Accidental Feminism: Gender Parity and Selective Mobility Among India’s Professional Elite (Princeton University Press); Ghazala Wahab, Born a Muslim: Some Truths about Islam in India (Aleph Book Company); Suchitra Vijayan, Midnight’s Borders: A People’s History of Modern India (Context/Westland); Rukmini S., Whole Numbers and Half Truths: What Data Can and Cannot Tell Us About Modern India (Context/Westland)	
2023	Akshaya Mukul		
2024	Ashok Gopal, A Part Apart: The Life and Thought of B.R. Ambedkar	Neerja Choudhry, How Prime Ministers Decide (Aleph); Radhika Iyengar, Fire on the Ganges: Life Among the Dead in Banaras (HarperCollins); Kunal Purohit, H-Pop: The Secretive World of Hindutva Pop Stars (HarperCollins); Chitralekha Zutshi, Sheikh Abdullah: The Caged Lion of Kashmir (HarperCollins).	
