= Britten Pears Young Artist Programme =

The Britten–Pears School for Advanced Musical Studies was founded in 1977 in Aldeburgh, Suffolk, following the success both of the master classes held for singers by Peter Pears from 1972, and of the subsequent courses for string players.

The School grew to offer a varied programme of practical and academic courses for young musicians and singers at the start of their professional career. Master classes have been taught by such distinguished visiting faculty members as Elisabeth Schwarzkopf, Murray Perahia and Pierre Fournier.

The successor of the school, the Britten–Pears Young Artist Programme, continues to provide training for outstanding young professionals from around the world and also manages courses for the Britten-Pears Orchestra, formerly The Snape Maltings Training Orchestra.

The contemporary composition and performance course was founded by Oliver Knussen and Colin Matthews in 1992. More recently there has been in addition a digital media course, called New Music/New Media. In September 2012, the course was led by Rolf Wallin, Tansy Davies, and Alexander Refsum Jensenius, co-founder of the Oslo Laptop Orchestra.

String quartets come together each spring and present a weekly recital of "work-in-progress" at the Jubilee Hall, and in late summer the International Academy of String Quartets provides further opportunities for working on repertoire. Menahem Pressler, Pierre-Laurent Aimard and the Arditti Quartet have all taught masterclasses.
