= Kamala Devi =

Kamala Devi or Kamaladevi may refer to:

- Kamaladevi, wife of Lalitaditya Muktapida, an 8th-century king of Kashmir
- Kamala Devi (footballer) (born 1992), Indian footballer
- Kamala Devi (actress) (1933–2010), Indian actress who starred in American Westerns
- Kamala Devi Harris (born 1964), American politician and 49th vice president of the United States
- Kamaladevi Chattopadhyay (1903–1988), Indian social activist
  - Kamaladevi Chattopadhyay NIF Book Prize, Indian literary award
