= Alien registration =

An alien registration card may refer to:

- Alien registration in India
- Alien registration in Japan
- Resident registration number (South Korea)
- Permanent residence (United States)
