= Foreigners Registration Office =

Indian government agency

Foreigners Registration Office (FRO)
Agency overview
- Jurisdiction: Republic of India
- Minister responsible: Amit Shah, Minister of Home Affairs
- Parent agency: Bureau of Immigration
- Website: https://indianfrro.gov.in/eservices/home.jsp

The Foreigners Registration Office (FRO) is an Indian government agency responsible for administering foreigner registration and immigration related functions for visitors to India.

== Foreigner registration in India ==
Foreigner registration is a mandatory requirement by the Government of India. Some foreign nationals (excluding overseas citizens of India) in India are required to register with the FRO at a specific timeframe.

== Regional officers ==
=== Foreigners Regional Registration Offices (FRRO) ===
Foreigners Regional Registration Offices (FRRO) are established in various regions for ease of registration. Offices are located in Kolkata, Mumbai, New Delhi, Chennai, Amritsar, Bangalore and Hyderabad. In regions without offices, the District Superintendents of Police serve as Registration Officers.

=== e-FRRO ===
In April 2018, the Union Government launched the e-FRRO scheme which allows foreigners to register and avail visa and immigration related services online. Under the new scheme, a foreign citizen is no longer required to appear in-person at an FRRO, unless specifically required to do so. Around 360,000 foreign citizens visited FRRO offices across India in 2017.
