= Ornit Shani =

Israeli academic and author

- Notable work: How India Became Democratic

Ornit Shani (Hebrew: אורנית שני) is an Israeli academic, author and professor at the Department of Asian Studies at the University of Haifa. She won the Kamaladevi Chattopadhyay NIF Book Prize in 2018 for her book How India Became Democratic. Her previous book is Communalism, Caste, and Hindu Nationalism: The Violence in Gujarat which covers identity and caste politics, the rise of Hindu nationalism, Indian citizenship, democracy and the history of elections.
