= Wild Himalaya =

2019 book by Stephen Alter

Wild Himalaya: A Natural History of the Greatest Mountain Range on Earth
- Author: Stephen Alter
- Language: English
- Subject: Travel literature
- Genre: Nonfiction
- Published: 2 August 2019
- Publisher: Aleph Book Company
- Publication place: India
- Media type: Hardcover
- Pages: 402
- ISBN: 978-9388292771

Wild Himalaya: A Natural History of the Greatest Mountain Range on Earth is a nonfiction book by Stephen Alter.

== Background ==
This book details the author's journeys to all five countries traversed by the Himalayas: India, Pakistan, Bhutan, Nepal, and China.

== Reception ==
Shyam Saran writes for the Business Standard, "Across nearly 400 densely packed pages, grouped in eight sections and 50 chapters, Alter turns biographer, narrating the incredible tale of the mountain range, almost in stream of consciousness style, mixing science with legend, history with myths, and personal affinity with how others have related to its varied landscape of intense fecundity and frozen desolation."

In a review for The Hindu, the deputy editor of Frontline Anusua Mukherjee writes, "Wild Himalaya is about entities that are the antithesis of the wild, at least theoretically — the state and the military."

Writing for The Indian Express, environmentalist and bird watcher Ranjit Lal in his review suggest that "Stephen Alter’s exhaustive biography of the Himalayas is an exceptional tribute to the world’s mightiest mountains."

== Awards and nominations ==
- The Himalayan Club's 2020 Kekoo Naoroji Award.
