= Stephen Alter =

American author born in India

Stephen Alter is an American author of more than 20 books of fiction and non-fiction. He was born in Mussoorie, India and much of his writing focuses on the Indian Himalayas and the broader Himalayan region. His novel, Birdwatching (Aleph 2022), received the 2023 Green Book of the Year Award at the Green Literature Festival, Bengaluru. Wild Himalaya: A Natural History of the Greatest Mountain Range on Earth (Aleph 2019) received the 2020 Banff Mountain Book Award in the Mountain Environment and Natural History category and the 2021 Kekoo Naoroji Award for Himalayan Literature. It was also shortlisted for the Kamaladevi Chattopadhyay NIF Prize. Becoming a Mountain: Himalayan Journeys in Search of the Sacred and the Sublime (Aleph 2014) received the 2015 Kekoo Naoroji Award. In The Jungles of the Night: A Novel about Jim Corbett (Aleph 2016) was shortlisted for the DSC South Asian Literature Award.

He has written extensively on natural history, folklore and mountain culture, particularly in his travel memoir Sacred Waters: A Pilgrimage to the Many Sources of the Ganga. Educated at Woodstock School and Wesleyan University, Alter has taught at the American University in Cairo, Egypt, where he was director of the writing program for seven years. Following this, he was a writer-in-residence at MIT for ten years.

Among the honours he has received are fellowships from the Guggenheim Foundation, the Fulbright Program, the East West Centre in Hawaii, and the Banff Centre for Mountain Culture.

His most recent novel is Death in Shambles: A Hill Station Mystery (Aleph 2023) and his latest non-fiction book, is The Cobra's Gaze: Exploring India's Wild Heritage (Aleph 2024). Alter also carries an Overseas Citizenship of India.

== Selected titles ==
Non-Fiction

- All the Way to Heaven: An American Boyhood in the Himalayas (1998)
- Amritsar to Lahore: A Journey Across the India-Pakistan Border (2000)
- Sacred Waters: A Pilgrimage Up the Ganges River to the Source of Hindu Culture (2001)
- Elephas Maximus: A Portrait of the Indian Elephant (2004)
- Fantasies of a Bollywood Love Thief (2007)
- Becoming a Mountain: Himalayan Journeys in Search of the Sacred and the Sublime (2014)
- Wild Himalaya: A Natural History of the Greatest Mountain Range on Earth (2019)
- The Cobra's Gaze: Exploring India's Wild Heritage (2024)

Fiction

- Neglected Lives (1979)
- Silk and Steel (1980)
- The Godchild (1988)
- Renuka (1990)
- Aripan & Other Stories (2005)
- The Rataban Betrayal (2013) a modern thriller set in Mussoorie, about an attempt to assassinate the Dalai Lama, with a backstory relocating the 1965 CIA expedition up Nanda Devi to Rataban
- In the Jungles of the Night: A Novel about Jim Corbett (2016)
- The Dalliance of Leopards (2017) (Published in India under the title: "Guldaar, Warlord of The Hindu Kush")
- Feral Dreams: Mowgli and His Mothers (2020)
- Birdwatching: a novel (2022)
- Death in Shambles: A Hillstation Mystery (2023)
- The Greatest Game - Being the Further Adventures of Kimball O' Hara (2025)

For Young Readers

- The Phantom Isles (2007)
- Ghost Letters (2008)
- The Secret Sanctuary (2015)
- The Cloudfarers (2018)

Editor

- The Penguin Book of Modern Indian Short Stories (2001)
- The Corbett Papers (with Akshay Shah) (2022)
