= Tove Billington Bye =

Norwegian politician (1928–2008)

Tove Billington Bye (née Jørgensen) (28 July 1928 – 15 May 2008) was a Norwegian politician for the Centre Party.

She served as a deputy representative to the Norwegian Parliament from Akershus during the terms 1973–1977 and 1977–1981.

On the local level, she was a member of the executive committee of Asker municipal council, having been elected in the so-called "women's coup" where four women (Tove Billington Bye, Berit Ås, Marie Borge Refsum and Kari Bjerke Anderssen) led a successful campaign to get women elected to the municipal council.

She was married to legendary Norwegian TV and radio personality Erik Bye from 1953 to his death in 2004, and lived at Hvalstad.
