= When Crime Pays =

2017 book

- Author: Milan Vaishnav
- Language: English
- Publisher: Yale University Press
- Publication date: 2017
- ISBN: 978-0-300-21620-2

When Crime Pays: Money and Muscle in Indian Politics is a 2017 book by senior fellow at the Carnegie Endowment for International Peace and political scientist, Milan Vaishnav, exploring the connection between criminality and democracy in Indian politics. The book uses statistics from official sources to investigate what explains the supply, demand and fielding of criminals by political parties in elections. It received the first Kamaladevi Chattopadhyay NIF Book Prize in the year 2018.

== Background ==
When six jailed MPs were given furlough from jail to vote in Lok Sabha during the 2008 Lok Sabha vote of confidence, the incident caught the attention of the author Milan Vaishnav which motivated him to start exploring the relation between criminality and politics in India .

== Synopsis ==
The book argues that voters vote for criminal politicians not despite but because of their criminal record, debunking the "ignorant voter" hypothesis- that voters vote for candidates with criminal backgrounds due to lack of knowledge of it.

The supply of candidates with criminal backgrounds, according to the book, is due to convergence of three trends- political fragmentation, deepening competition and continued Congress decline - in 1980s. In the first two decades after India's independence, muscle power was used to mobilize voters for the Congress. This led to uncertainty that the party which they worked for will remain in power. To explain this, the author employs the concept of vertical integration.

Next comes the incentives of political parties to field candidates with criminal backgrounds. In India, elections are very expensive with costs soaring every year. Candidates with criminal backgrounds often have wealth earned from illicit methods. This makes them in a position to self finance and thereby reducing the financial burden on the parties.

The demand of such politicians comes from a combination of weak state infrastructure and social divisions within the society. Due to weak infrastructure, the elected candidate is able to fill the vacuum produced by the state and social divisions give voters a preference of someone from their community who promises to protect their interests over a clean candidate of another community.
