= Alexander Refsum Jensenius =

Norwegian researcher and musician (born 1978)

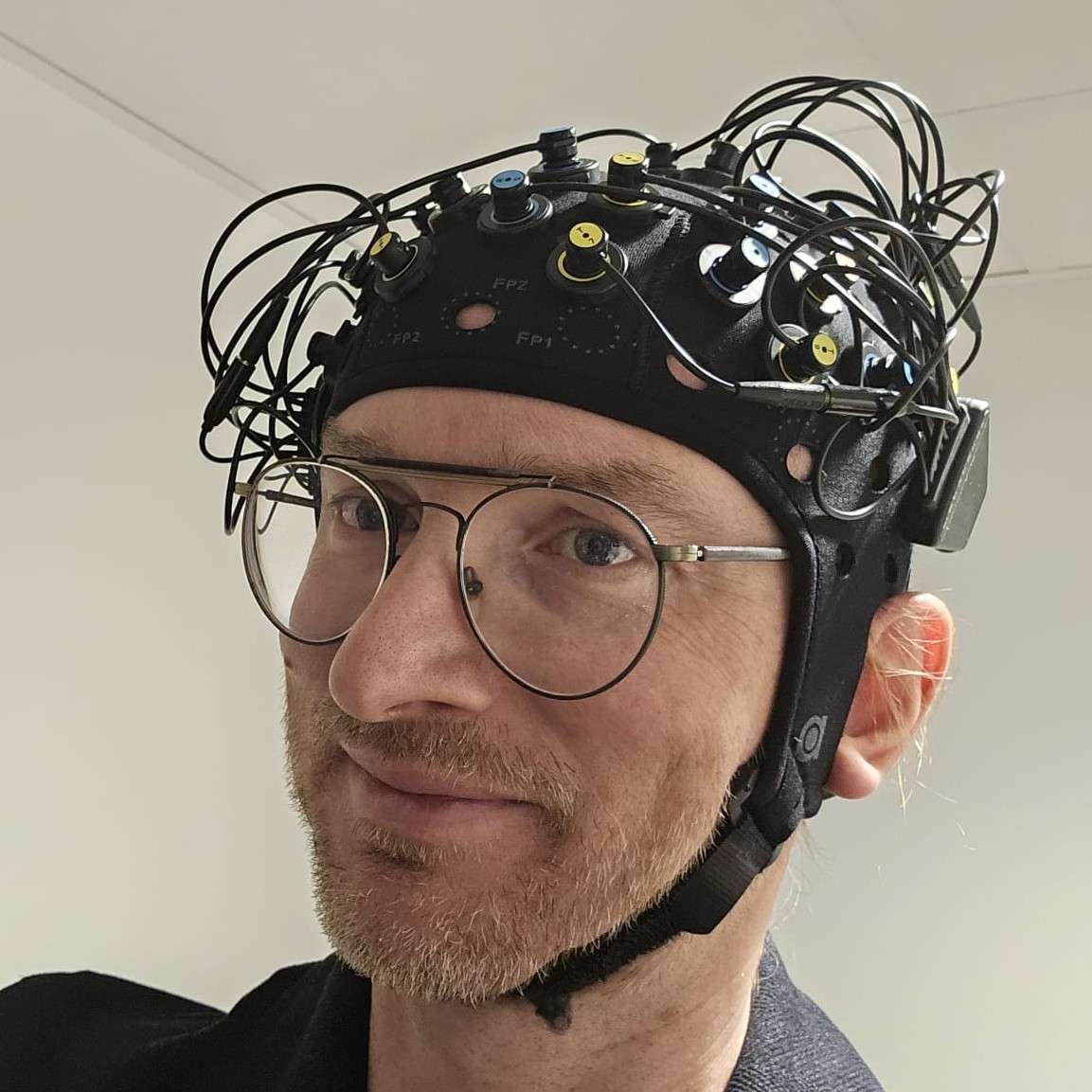
- Jensenius with an fNIRS cap
- Born: 10 November 1978 (age 47); Asker, Norway
- Education: University of Oslo, Chalmers University of Technology
- Occupation: Music Technologist
- Employer: University of Oslo
- Title: Professor
- Website: www.arj.no

Alexander Refsum Jensenius (born 10 November 1978) is a Norwegian researcher and musician. He is Professor of music technology and Director of RITMO - Centre for Interdisciplinary Studies in Rhythm, Time and Motion at the University of Oslo, and Director of the Center for AI & Creativity that was awarded 200 million NOK in 2025. He was Head of the Department of Musicology at the University of Oslo from 2013 to 2016 and served as the Chair of the Steering Committee for NIME, the International Conference in New Interfaces for Musical Expression from 2011 to 2022. He is the grandson of politician Marie Borge Refsum and brother of Francesca R. Jensenius.

Jensenius is educated in music, computer science, physics and mathematics. He was awarded a Master of Arts degree (cand.philol.) in Music technology by the University of Oslo in 2002, and was awarded a doctorate by the same institution in 2008. In addition he holds a Master of Science degree in applied information technology from Chalmers University of Technology in Gothenburg. He has been guest researcher at University of California, Berkeley and McGill University in Montreal.

Jensenius received unusually high media attention when he finished his doctorate. Several newspapers and TV stations named him "Dr Air guitar". This was based on his research into musical gestures. He had developed a new technology for the analysis of movement. This technology is both used in music research and in psychological research on ADHD.

Alexander Jensenius was president of the Norwegian Association of Young Scientists from 1999 to 2001 and has also been project manager for European Space Camp at Andøya Rocket Range. He was a candidate for the board of the University of Oslo in 2007.

== Bibliography ==
- Jensenius, Alexander Refsum; Lyons, Michael, eds. (2017). A NIME Reader: Fifteen Years of New Interfaces for Musical Expression. Springer. ISBN 978-3-319-47214-0.
- Jensenius, Alexander Refsum (2007). Action-sound: developing methods and tools to study music-related body movement (PDF). Oslo: University of Oslo.
- Jensenius, Alexander Refsum (2005). Towards Hypermedia Performance – On the Boundaries Between Body, Time, Space (PDF). Gothenburg: Chalmers University of Technology. Archived from the original (PDF) on June 16, 2009.
- Jensenius, Alexander Refsum (2002). How do we recognize a song in one second? -The Importance of Salience and Sound in Music Perception (PDF). Oslo: University of Oslo.
