= Inner Line Permit =

Indian travel document, required for entrance into a protected area

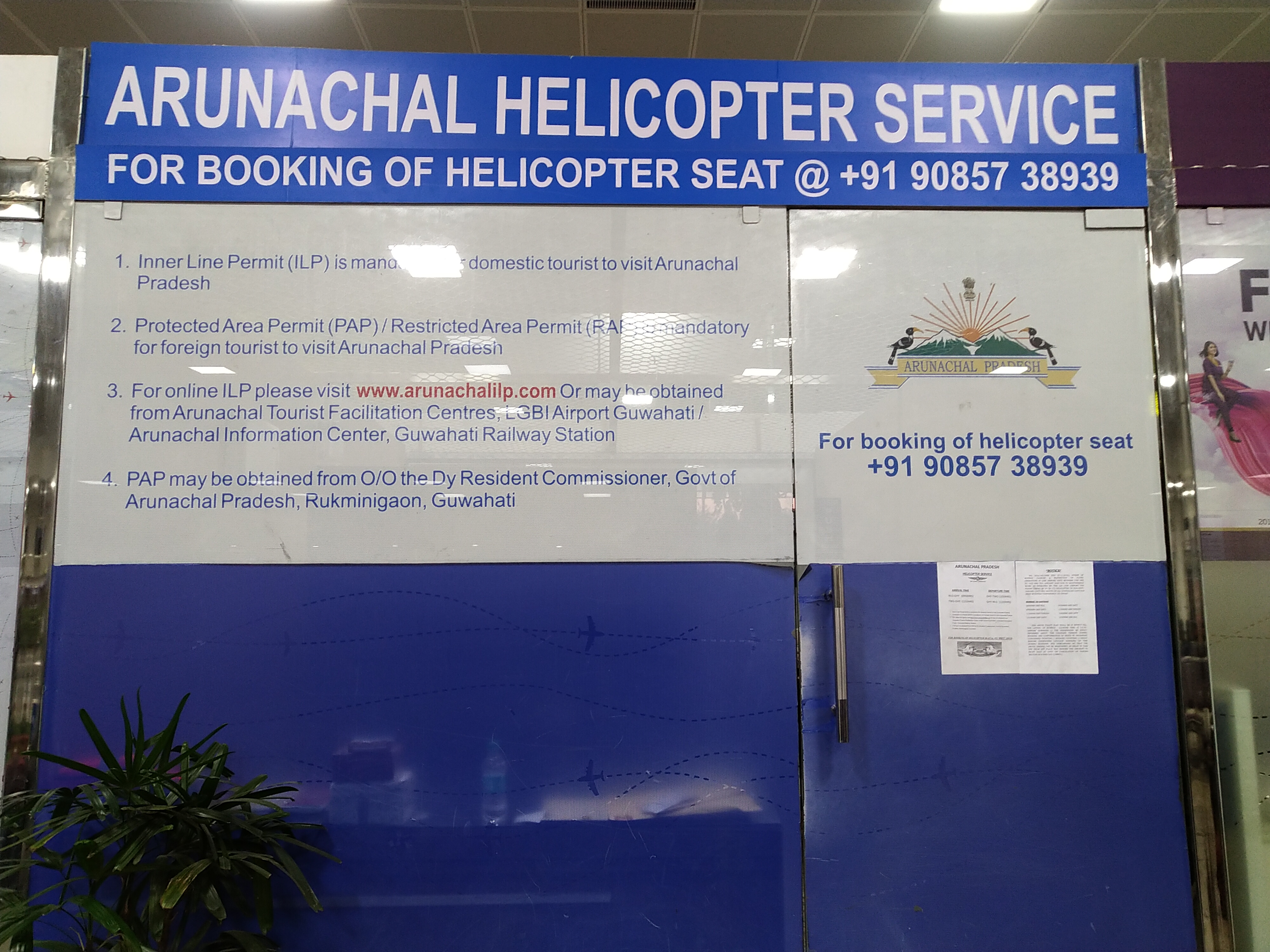
Sign in Guwahati Airport showing Inner Line Permit requirements to Arunachal Pradesh

Inner Line Permit (ILP) is an official travel document issued by the state government concerned to allow inward travel of an Indian citizen into a protected area for a limited period. It is obligatory for Indian citizens from outside those states to obtain a permit to enter the protected state. The document is an effort by the government to regulate movement to certain areas located near the international border of India. An ILP is usually significantly easier to obtain than the analogous Protected Area Permit (PAP) which is the document required by non-domicile to enter the same areas.

== Background ==
The administrative device of Inner Line was introduced under the British Raj through the Bengal Eastern Frontier Regulation of 1873. It authorised the provincial government to define a so-called "Inner Line" beyond which "British subjects" (i.e., the people of the British Indian provinces) could not travel without a pass. The regulations also laid down rules regarding trade, possession of land and other matters.

The rationale for the regulation arose from the expansion of the tea industry in the Himalayan foothills in the second half of the nineteenth century. Timber companies also looked to the forest areas for extracting resources. The British government felt that uncontrolled expansion of the commercial interests into the tribal territory would cause disturbances that might warrant expensive punitive expeditions. The government was intent on warding off such dangers.

According to an administrator who was given the task of demarcating it, the Inner Line was supposed to "demarcate the Hills from the plains, the nomadic from the sedentary, the jungle from the arable – in short, the tribal areas from the Assam proper". The territory beyond the inner line came to be called "Backward Tracts", and later "Excluded Areas". After Indian independence, they were named "Scheduled Areas" and the inner line mechanism was retained as a means of protecting the hill tribes and safeguarding their culture, by barring land acquisition by non-indigenous people.

The Inner Line regulations were applied to the frontier tracts that currently make up Arunachal Pradesh, Nagaland (then Naga Hills district) and Mizoram (then Lushai Hills district). Parts of it also applied to the Garo Hills district, repealed in 1897, and to the Chittagong Hills region, repealed in 1903. They were never applied to the princely states such as Manipur and Tripura or protectorates such as Sikkim.

== Constitutionality ==
According to the Constitution of India, all Indian citizens are free to live and work in any state of the country, but entry to certain states with a protected status requires authorisation by the state government concerned.

There are allegations that ILP violates the fundamental rights of the Indian citizens guaranteed under Articles 14, 15, 19 and 21 and also it suppresses the nation's integrity.

== States which require a permit ==
- Arunachal Pradesh — Issued by the secretary (political) of the Government of Arunachal Pradesh. It is required for entering Arunachal Pradesh through any of the check points across the interstate border with Assam or Nagaland. An ILP for temporary visitors is valid for 15 days and can be extended, while one for those taking employment in the state and their immediate family members is valid for a year. The Arunachal Pradesh government is planning to implement a permit-on-arrival system.
- Manipur — Issued by the Government of Manipur. The Inner Line Permit (ILP) regime was extended to Manipur on 11 December 2019 with then-President Ram Nath Kovind signing the order to this effect. The decision came two days after Union Home Minister Amit Shah announced in Lok Sabha that the ILP would be extended to the northeastern state. Manipur is the fourth state after Arunachal Pradesh, Nagaland, and Mizoram where the ILP regime is applicable.
- Mizoram — Issued by the Government of Mizoram. It is required for entering Mizoram through any of the check gates across the interstate borders. Typically, a "Temporary ILP" is issued to visitors, which is valid for 15 days and can be extended another 15 days, with the possibility of extending it to one month in exceptional circumstances. However, with the sponsorship of a local resident or government department, a "Regular ILP" can be procured, which is valid for 6 months and can be renewed twice for another 6 months each. If arriving by air, an ILP can be obtained on arrival at Lengpui Airport in Aizawl.
- Nagaland — Issued by the Government of Nagaland. The Regulation makes it obligatory for anyone, be it an Indian citizen or a foreigner, who is not an indigenous inhabitant of Nagaland, to obtain an Inner Line Permit (ILP) in such form, and with such conditions, as may be prescribed by the Government of Nagaland, to enter the state of Nagaland for a limited period. The permit fee is ₹200 (US$2.10) for Indian and ₹300 (US$3.10) for foreign tourists. Higher fees apply to other categories.

An ILP was previously required for certain parts of the Leh district in Ladakh. This requirement was abolished by a circular issued by the district magistrate which took effect from 1 May 2014, although foreign nationals are required to get Protected Area Permit for this region. The ILP was implemented again in 2017 only to be removed again in 2021.

== Demands for ILP in other states ==
There are ongoing demands for the introduction of an ILP in Meghalaya to regulate the entry of outsiders into the state.

There are also strong demands in Tamil Nadu for the introduction of ILP to regulate the unauthorized entry of outsiders into the state to "reduce the crime rates."

== See also ==
- Protected area permit

== Bibliography ==
- Phanjoubam, Pradip (23 July 2016), "Manipur and Mainstream Media: Lost in the Rhetoric", Economic and Political Weekly, 51 (30): 12–15, JSTOR 44003864
