= Foreigner registration in India =

Foreigner registration in India is an immigration system used to record information regarding alien visitors in India, In accordance with the Immigration and Foreigners Act, 2025. The system mandates that some foreign nationals over the age of 16 to register themselves and submit additional documentation at the nearest Foreigners Registration Office within a specific time frame when arriving in India. Failure to register can result in fines, imprisonment, and removal from India.

After submission, a resident permit is issued by the Bureau of Immigration, The permit has a validity matching the period of stay specified in the visa, and must be amended if immigration status changes.

== Details and exceptions ==
All foreign nationals possessing a long term visa (more than 180 days) must register within 14 days of their arrival in India, with a few exceptions

- U.S nationals holding ten-year Tourist/Business Visas provided their continuous stay during each visit does not exceed six months.
- Foreigners of Indian origin holding five-year multiple entry X visa with an endorsement that "stay should not exceed six months during each visit”.
- Foreigners holding five-year Tourist Visas, who are actively engaged in tourist/travel trade, desirous of visiting India frequently over extended periods for promotion of tourism, etc., provided that their visa contains an endorsement that "continuous stay should not exceed six months”.

Pakistani citizens must register within 24 hours of arrival in India.

Afghan citizens must register within 7 days of arrival in India.

Foreign nationals who possess Overseas Citizen of India status are exempted from registering in any circumstance.
