= Darrangamela =

Village in Assam, India

Darrangamela Darangamela, Darranga
- Village
- Map of Assam Darrangamela (India)
- Coordinates: 26.7875°N 91.4955°E
- Country: India
- State: Assam
- District: Tamulpur
- Tehsil: Tamulpur

Area
  - Total: 44.52 ha (110.0 acres)

Population (2011)
  - Total: 1,123
  - Density: 2,522/km^{2} (6,533/sq mi)

Languages
  - Official: Assamese
- Time zone: UTC+5:30 (IST)
- Postal code: 781360
- STD Code: 03623
- Vehicle registration: AS-28
- Census code: 304602

Darrangamela, commonly known as Darranga mela or Darangamela or Darranga, is a census village in Tamulpur district, Assam, India. As per the 2011 Census of India the village has a total population of 1,123 people including 584 males and 539 females with a literacy rate of 73.02%.

The Darrangamela village is located in India-Bhutan border area. The Darrangamela village carries a long history of militancy-affected areas with activities of both the militants and security forces.
