= Born a Muslim =

Book by Ghazala Wahab

Born a Muslim: Some Truths about Islam in India
- First edition cover
- Author: Ghazala Wahab
- Subject: Politics, religion, philosophy
- Published: 2021 (Aleph Book Company)
- Publication place: India
- Pages: 408
- ISBN: 978-9390652167

Born a Muslim: Some Truths about Islam in India is a non-fiction book by Indian journalist Ghazala Wahab. The book presents the structural discrimination and prejudices faced by Muslims in India.

The book received the Tata Literature Live! Book of the Year Award for Non-Fiction in 2021.
