= Protected and restricted areas of India =

Travel restrictions for non-Indian citizens in India

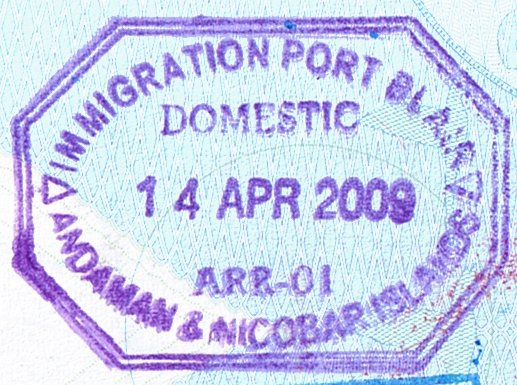
Domestic Immigration stamp permitting entry into the Andaman and Nicobar Islands

The Foreigners (Protected Areas) Order, 1958 states that a Protected Area Permit (PAP) is required for non-Indian citizens to visit certain areas in India (mainly in the Northeast India). Certain requirements have to be fulfilled in order to get this permit. Indian citizens who are not residents in these areas need an Inner Line Permit (ILP) to enter these places. The Inner Line Permit is significantly easier to get.

In addition, the Foreigners (Restricted Areas) Order, 1963 states that a Restricted Area Permit (RAP) is required for non-Indians to visit certain areas in India. As of 2009, RAP are required for visits to parts of the union territory of the Andaman and Nicobar Islands and parts of the state of Sikkim. Unlike PAP, RAP are generally available for individual travellers and can be issued by overseas embassies or even, in some cases such as Port Blair's Veer Savarkar International Airport, on the spot. Indian citizens do not need special permission to visit restricted areas.

== List of Protected and Restricted Areas ==
As of 2018:

=== Protected Areas ===
- Whole of Arunachal Pradesh
- Parts of Himachal Pradesh:
  - Parts of Pooh block of Kinnaur district
  - Parts of Spiti sub-division of Lahaul and Spiti district
- Parts of Ladakh:
  - Parts of Khalatse
  - Parts of Nubra sub-division, including Turtuk valley
  - Parts of Pangong Lake area
  - Chiktan and Batalik areas of Kargil district
- Whole of Manipur
- Whole of Mizoram
- Whole of Nagaland
- Parts of Rajasthan
  - Generally the areas inside the belt within 40 km from the international border of Rajasthan, west of National Highway 68
- Whole of Sikkim (partly in Protected Area and partly in Restricted Area)
- Parts of Uttarakhand
  - Areas between the Inner Line and the international border, including Nanda Devi sanctuary, Niti Valley, Kalindi Pass and Milam Glacier

=== Restricted Areas ===
- Parts of Andaman and Nicobar Islands. 30 inhabited islands no longer need RAP for foreigners since 2018.
- Parts of Sikkim

=== Formerly Protected or Restricted Areas ===
- All of Lakshadweep
- Parts of Ladakh

Manipur, Mizoram and Nagaland were formerly excluded from the Protected Area regime between 30 December 2010 and 31 December 2012 by MHA vide MHA ID Note No.13/6/99-NE.II Vol.V dated 23 March 2012.

== General Protected Area Permit requirements ==
- Tourists must travel in groups of at least 2
- Tourists must travel with a registered travel agent
- In some areas only certain entry/exit points are allowed. In certain areas non-Indians cannot enter at all
- Citizens of Pakistan, Bangladesh, China and Myanmar can get the PAP only with approval of the Ministry of Home Affairs

Normally the PAP has a duration of 10 days, with the option of extending for another 7 days. The PAP is issued by the Ministry of Home Affairs. However, the different authorities of the concerned Indian states can also issue the PAP, and also the Indian missions abroad. Normally the travel agent will take care of getting the PAP for the tourists.

== See also ==
- Bureau of Immigration (India)
- Immigration to India
- Illegal immigration to India
- Refugees in India
