= Bureau of Immigration (India) =

India government agency

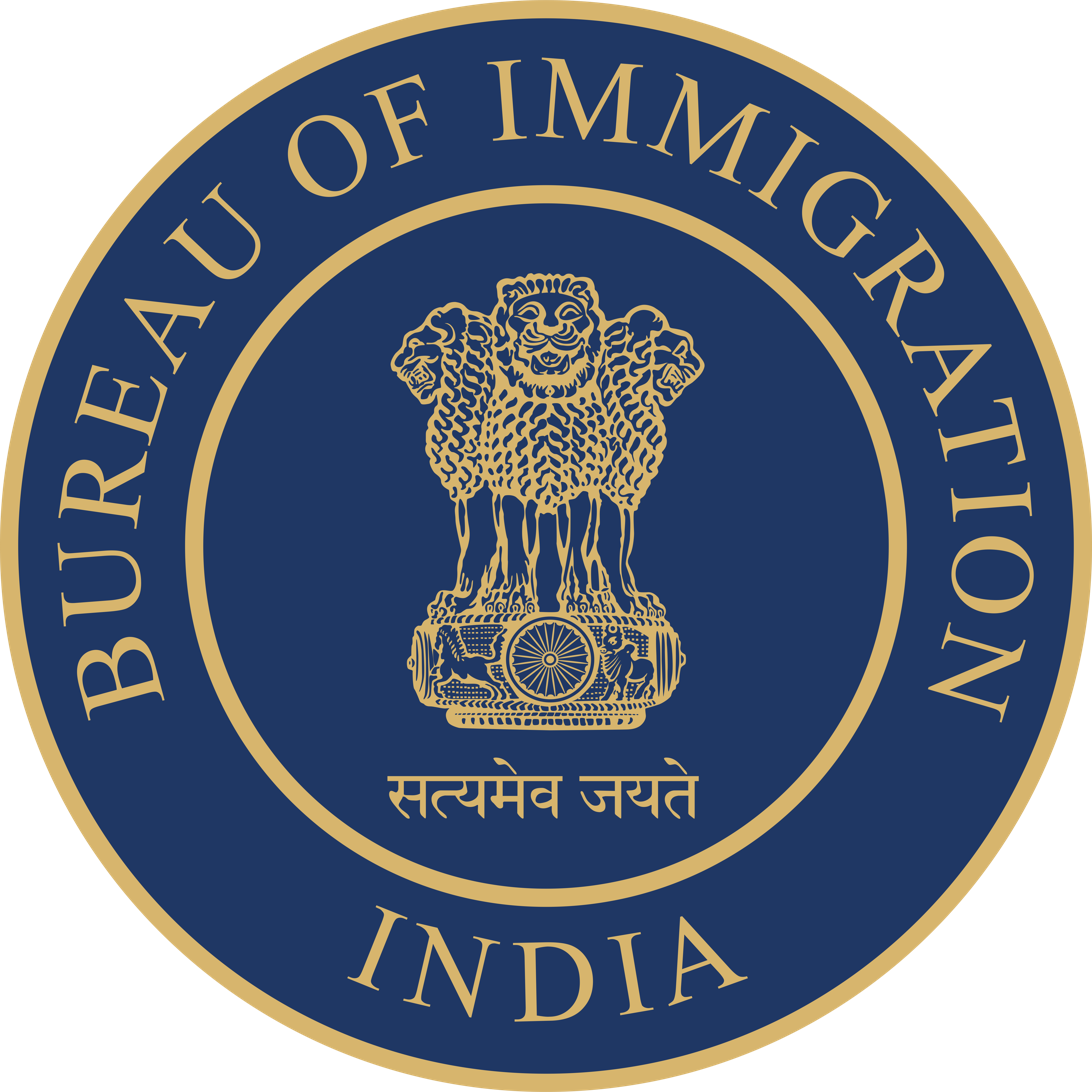

Agency overview
- Formed: 1971; 55 years ago
- Headquarters: East Block-VIII, Level-V, Sector-1, Rama Krishna Puram, New Delhi
- Employees: 6000
- Minister responsible: Amit Shah, Minister of Home Affairs
- Deputy Ministers responsible: Ajay Kumar Mishra, Minister of State for Home Affairs; Nityanand Rai
- Agency executive: Anoop Krishna IPS, Commissioner of Immigration
- Child agency: Foreigners Regional Registration Office
- Website: boi.gov.in

The Bureau of Immigration (BoI) is an Indian government agency, working under the Ministry of Home Affairs responsible for administering immigration related functions such as immigration facilitation service at Sea-ports, Integrated Check Posts and Airports and foreigner registration. The agency was established in 1971, and is headed by the Commissioner of Immigration. The BoI is a department directly under the Ministry of Home Affairs. The BoI manages 48 of the 108 immigration check posts operating in India. The remaining are controlled by the respective State Governments. Generally, Foreigners Regional Registration Office is headed by an Assistant Director or a Joint Deputy Director rank officer of the Ministry of Home Affairs.

== See also ==
- Indian Diaspora
- Immigration to India
- Illegal immigration to India
- Refugees in India
- Protected and restricted areas of India
