= Francesca R. Jensenius =

Norwegian political scientist

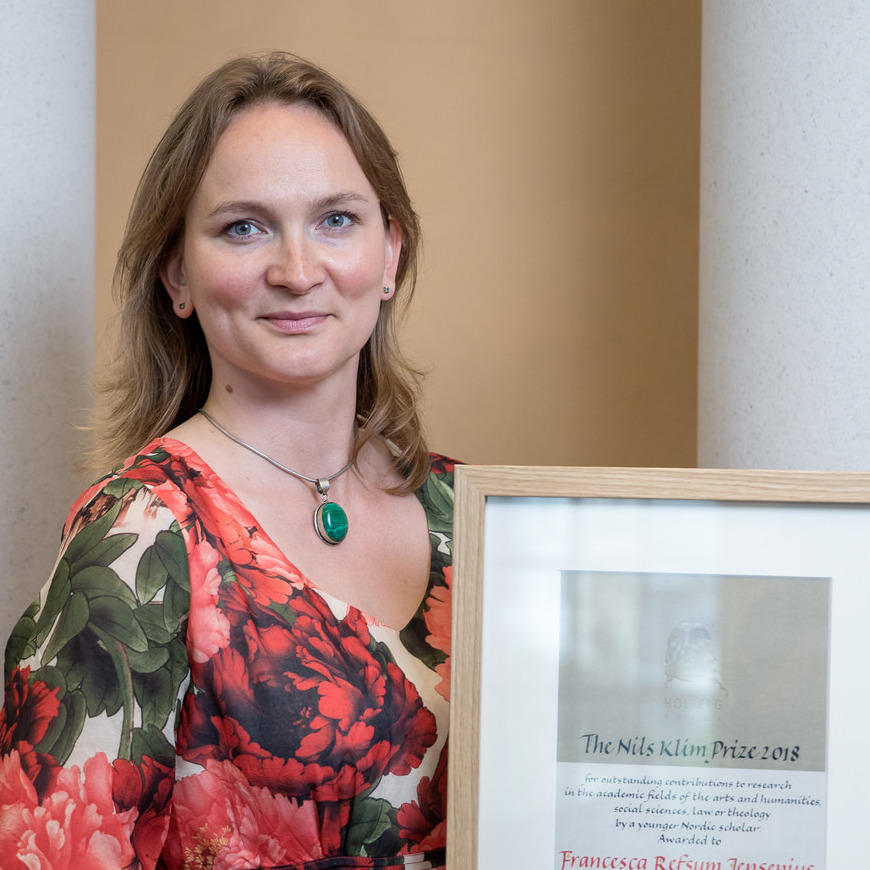
Image of Francesca Refsum Jensenius

Francesca Refsum Jensenius is a Norwegian political scientist currently working as a professor at the University of Oslo. Her work relates to comparative politics and specifically focuses on the Indian political economy. She received the Nils Klim Prize in 2018 for her contributions to scholarship.

== Career ==
Jensenius completed her undergraduate degree from the University of Oslo in 2005, studying for a bachelor's in arts and the Hindi language. She earned an M.A. in political science from Duke University. Her doctoral work was completed at the University of California, Berkeley, and studied electoral quotas for scheduled castes in India. She is currently a professor at the University of Oslo, in the department of political science.

In 2017, Jensenius published Social Justice through Inclusion: The Consequences of Electoral Quotas in India (Oxford University Press), for which she won the Nils Klim Prize in 2018. Her research work has since examined the economic agency of women, political representation, and legal regimes in comparative context. She has been published in Comparative Political Studies, the American Journal of Political Science, Journal of Politics, and Studies in Indian Politics.
