= Post Office Passport Seva Kendra =

Indian government initiative

Post Office Passport Seva Kendra (POPSK)
- Slogan: Service Excellence
- Country: India
- Prime Minister(s): Narendra Modi
- Ministry: Ministry of External Affairs (India); India Post
- Key people: S Jaishankar (Minister of External Affairs) General V. K. Singh (Minister of State of External Affairs)
- Launched: 24-January-2017; 9 years ago
- Status: Active
- Website: passportindia.gov.in

Post Office Passport Seva Kendra (lit. 'Post Office Passport Service Centre (POPSC)') abbreviated as POPSK is an Indian government initiative by the Ministry of External Affairs (India) (MEA) and the Department of Posts (DoP), where the Head Post Offices (HPO) and post offices is being utilized as Post Office Passport Seva Kendra (POPSK) for delivery of passport related services to the citizens of India. The purpose of this initiative is to develop passport related services on a bigger scale and to ensure wider area coverage. As of November 2019 a total of 424 POPSKs have been made operational in the country.

== History ==
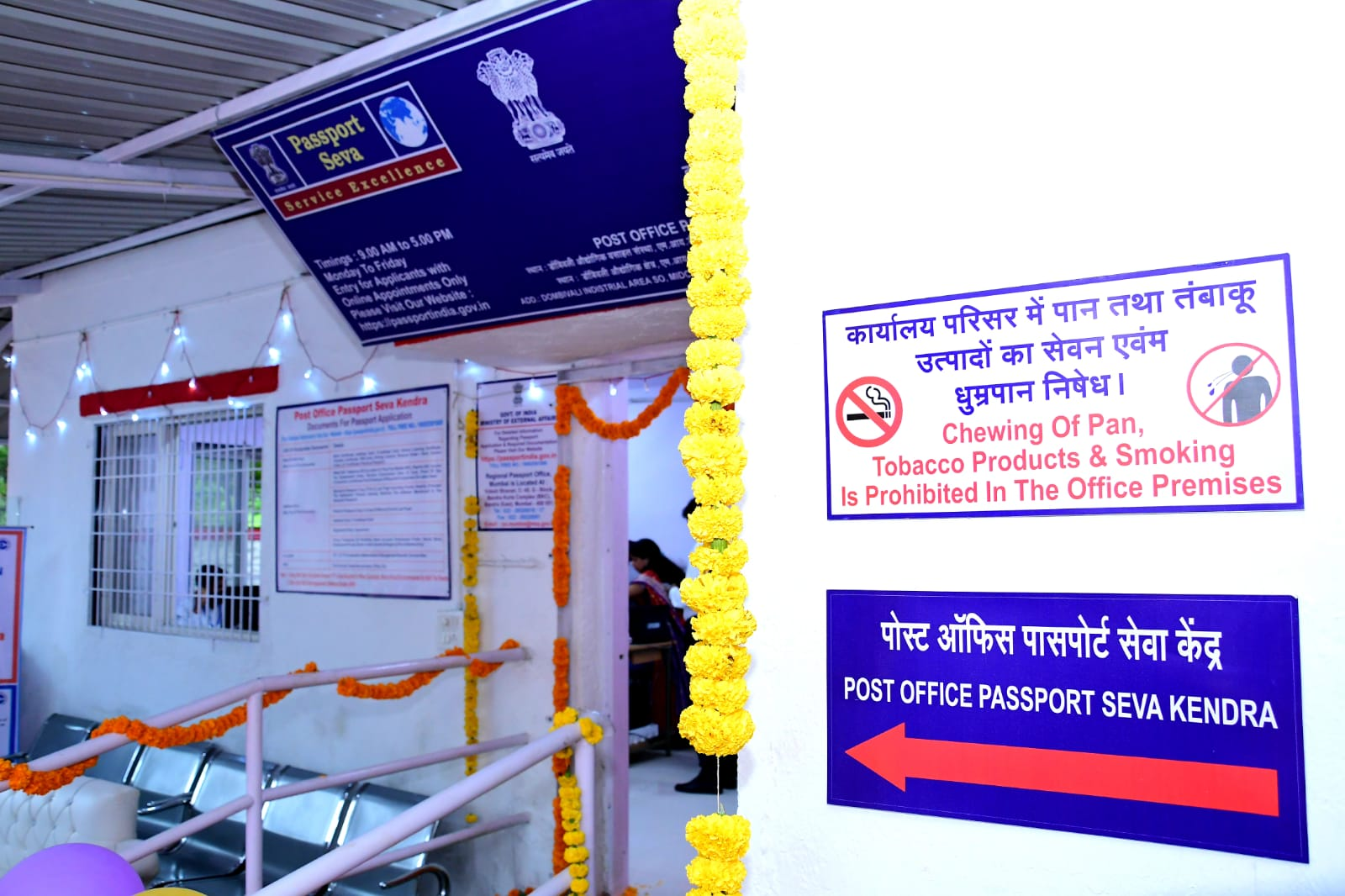
A newly inaugurated entrance of the Post-Office Passport Seva Kendra in Dombivli, Mumbai

POPSK was announced on 24-January-2017 as a joint venture between Ministry of External Affairs and the Department of Posts for the objective of using Head Post Offices (HPO) in various states of India as Post Office Passport Seva Kendra (POPSK) for ensuring wider access to passport services.

== See also ==
- List of passport offices in India
- Indian passport
- Visa requirements for Indian citizens
- Visa policy of India
- The Passports Act
- Ministry of External Affairs (India)
