= List of passport offices in India =

An Indian passport is a passport issued by the Government of India to citizens of the Republic of India for travelling abroad. It enables the bearer to travel internationally and serves as proof of Indian citizenship as per the Passports Act (1967).

Indian e-Passport.

The Ministry of External Affairs operates passport offices known as Passport Seva Kendras (PSK's) through 37 Regional Passport Offices, 93 Passport Seva Kendras (PSKs) and 424 Post Office Passport Seva Kendras (POPSK) as of March 2023. The ministry has also setup 14 mini passport offices known as Passport Seva Laghu Kendras.

== Passport Seva Kendras (PSK) ==
S.No.	Administration	Code	PSK Area	State/UT
1	Ahmedabad	AH	Mithakali, Ahmedabad	Gujarat
2	Ahmedabad	AH	Vijay Cross Road, Ahmedabad	Gujarat
3	Ahmedabad	AH	Rajkot	Gujarat
4	Ahmedabad	AH	Vadodara	Gujarat
5	Amritsar	AS	Amritsar	Punjab
6	Bareilly	BL	Bareilly	Uttar Pradesh
7	Bengaluru	BN	Lal Bagh, Bengaluru	Karnataka
8	Bengaluru	BN	Marathahalli, Bengaluru	Karnataka
9	Bengaluru	BN	Hubbali–Dharwad	Karnataka
10	Bengaluru	BN	Mangaluru	Karnataka
11	Bhopal	BP	Bhopal	Madhya Pradesh
12	Bhubaneswar	BH	Bhubaneswar	Odisha
13	Chandigarh	CH	Chandigarh	Chandigarh
14	Chandigarh	CH	Ambala	Haryana
15	Chandigarh	CH	Ludhiana	Punjab
16	Chennai	MA	Aminjikarai, Chennai	Tamil Nadu
17	Chennai	MA	Saligramam, Chennai	Tamil Nadu
18	Chennai	MA	Tambaram, Chennai	Tamil Nadu
19	Chennai	MA	Puducherry	Tamil Nadu
20	Cochin	CO	Tripunithura, Cochin	Kerala
21	Cochin	CO	Aluva, Cochin	Kerala
22	Cochin	CO	Alappuzha	Kerala
23	Cochin	CO	Kottayam	Kerala
24	Cochin	CO	Thrissur	Kerala
25	Coimbatore	CB	Coimbatore	Tamil Nadu
26	Dehradun	DD	Dehradun	Uttarakhand
27	Delhi NCR	DL	RK Puram, South West Delhi	Delhi
28	Delhi NCR	DL	Janakpuri, West Delhi	Delhi
29	Delhi NCR	DL	Shalimar Bagh, North Delhi	Delhi
30	Delhi NCR	DL	Herald House–ITO, Central Delhi	Delhi
31	Delhi NCR	DL	Nehru Place, South East Delhi	Delhi
32	Delhi NCR	DL	Defence Colony, South Delhi	Delhi
33	Delhi NCR	DL	Mehrauli, South Delhi	Delhi
34	Delhi NCR	DL	Jhandewalan, Central Delhi	Delhi
35	Delhi NCR	DL	Patparganj, East Delhi	Delhi
36	Delhi NCR	DL	Yamuna Vihar, North East Delhi	Delhi
37	Delhi NCR	DL	Gurgaon	Haryana
38	Delhi NCR	DL	Faridabad	Haryana
31	Delhi NCR	GZ	Ghaziabad	Uttar Pradesh
32	Goa	PJ	Panaji	Goa
33	Guwahati	GU	Guwahati	Assam
34	Hyderabad	HY	Begumpet, Hyderabad	Telangana
35	Hyderabad	HY	MGBS, Hyderabad	Telangana
37	Hyderabad	HY	Raidurg, Hyderabad	Telangana
38	Hyderabad	HY	Nizamabad	Telangana
39	Jaipur	JP	Jaipur	Rajasthan
40	Jaipur	JP	Jodhpur	Rajasthan
41	Jaipur	JP	Sikar	Rajasthan
42	Jalandhar	JA	PSK–1, Jalandhar	Punjab
43	Jalandhar	JA	PSK–2, Jalandhar	Punjab
44	Jalandhar	JA	Hoshiarpur	Punjab
45	Jammu	JM	Jammu	Jammu and Kashmir
46	Kolkata	CA	Kolkata	West Bengal
47	Kolkata	CA	Baharampur	West Bengal
48	Kota		Kota	Rajasthan
49	Kota		Udaipur II	Rajasthan
50	Kozhikode	KO	Koyenco House, Kozhikode	Kerala
51	Kozhikode	KO	Vatakara, Kozhikode	Kerala
52	Kozhikode	KO	Padannapalam, Kannur	Kerala
53	Kozhikode	KO	Payyanur, Kannur	Kerala
54	Kozhikode	KO	Malappuram II	Kerala
55	Lucknow	LK	PSK–1, Lucknow	Uttar Pradesh
56	Lucknow	LK	PSK–2, Lucknow	Uttar Pradesh
57	Lucknow	LK	Gorakhpur	Uttar Pradesh
58	Lucknow	LK	Kanpur	Uttar Pradesh
59	Lucknow	LK	Varanasi	Uttar Pradesh
60	Madurai	MD	Madurai	Tamil Nadu
61	Madurai	MD	Tirunelveli	Tamil Nadu
62	Mumbai	BO	Andheri, Mumbai	Maharashtra
63	Mumbai	BO	Lower Parel, Mumbai	Maharashtra
64	Mumbai	BO	Malad, Mumbai	Maharashtra
65	Mumbai	BO	Nashik II	Maharashtra
66	Mumbai	BO	Thane II	Maharashtra
67	Nagpur	NG	Nagpur	Maharashtra
68	Patna	PA	Patna	Bihar
69	Pune	PN	Pune	Maharashtra
70	Pune	PN	Solapur	Maharashtra
71	Raipur	RP	Raipur	Chhattisgarh
72	Ranchi	RC	Ranchi	Jharkhand
73	Shimla	SM	Shimla	Himachal Pradesh
74	Srinagar	SG	Srinagar	Jammu and Kashmir
75	Surat	SU	Surat	Gujarat
76	Surat	SU	Vadodara II	Gujarat
77	Tiruchirappalli		Tiruchirappalli	Tamil Nadu
78	Tiruchirappalli		Thanjavur	Tamil Nadu
79	Trivandrum	TV	Neyyattinkara, Trivandrum	Kerala
80	Trivandrum	TV	Vazhuthacaud, Trivandrum	Kerala
81	Trivandrum	TV	Kollam	Kerala
82	Vijayawada	VJ	Vijayawada II	Andhra Pradesh
83	Vijayawada	VJ	Tirupati II	Andhra Pradesh
84	Visakhapatnam	VS	Visakhapatnam	Andhra Pradesh

== Passport Seva Laghu Kendras (PSLK) ==
S.No.	Administration	Code	PSLK Area	State/UT
1	Bengaluru	BN	Gulbarga	Karnataka
2	Chennai	MA	Pondicherry	Puducherry
3	Guwahati	GU	Aizawl	Mizoram
4	Guwahati	GU	Chümoukedima	Nagaland
5	Guwahati	GU	Imphal	Manipur
6	Guwahati	GU	Itanagar	Arunachal Pradesh
7	Guwahati	GU	Shillong	Meghalaya
8	Hyderabad	HY	Karimnagar	Telangana
9	Kolkata	CA	Agartala	Tripura
10	Kolkata	CA	Gangtok	Sikkim
11	Pune	PN	Nanded	Maharashtra
12	Visakhapatnam	VS	Bhimavaram	Andhra Pradesh
13	Bhopal	IND	Indore	Madhya Pradesh

- Passport Seva, Ministry of External Affairs, Government of India
- Post Office Passport Seva Kendra Locator
