= Mithakhali Multi Sports Complex =

Indoor stadium in Ahemdabad, Gujarat, India

- Multi Sports Complex
- Location: Mithakali, Ahmedabad, Gujarat
- Owner: Ahmedabad Municipal Corporation
- Operator: Ahmedabad Municipal Corporation
- Capacity: 7,000

Construction
- Opened: 2007
- Cost: ₹ 21 crores

Mithakhali Multi Sports Complex, an indoor stadium located in Mithakali, Ahmedabad, Gujarat, India was built in 2007 to promote indoor sport in the city. It has an international standard table-tennis court, an outdoor basketball court and a badminton court. The stadium is owed and managed by Ahmedabad Municipal Corporation and has been host to national level games for roller skating and table tennis.
