= Visa requirements for Indian citizens =

Visa requirement policy for Indian citizen

An ordinary e-passport since 2025

Visa requirements for Indian citizens are administrative entry restrictions by the authorities of other countries placed on citizens of India.

As of 2026, Indian citizens has access to 27 visa-free, 47 visa-on-arrival and 66 e-visa countries as per Ministry Of External Affairs, Government Of India.

Recent changes:

Year	Changes
2026	Thailand reduces visa-free entry to 30 days for tourism, effective 15 Sep 2026. Argentina allows Indian citizens possessing a U.S. visa of type B2 / J / B1 / O / P (P1-P2-P3) / E / H-1B, or a U.S. Green Card to enter without a visa from Argentina, effective April 2026 As of February 2026, Nicaragua eliminated the Visa on Arrival and the substitute-visa program. Citizens of India are included in Category “C” visa consulted for ordinary passports and have to apply for a visa in advance of travel. Spain, France and Germany remove transit visa for Indians transiting to a non-EU country, effective 04 Mar 2026, 10 Apr 2026 & 03 June 2026, respectively. Uzbekistan now allows 30 days visa free access to Indian citizens. Belarus introduces e-visa for Indian citizens for stays upto 30 days. Malaysia will remove its visa-free entry facility starting January 1, 2027, and has made it a requirement for Indian travellers to obtain a visa before entering the country.

== Previous years ==
Year	Changes
2025	South Africa unveiled ETA for certain nations including India, for 90 days with another 90 days which can be extendable. Argentina introduced visa-free travel for Indian citizens holding a valid US B2 visa, exempting them from a separate visa or Electronic Travel Authorization (AVE) for tourism in Argentina as of late August 2025. The National Immigration Directorate will verify each case upon arrival. Iran has suspended the visa waiver facility available to ordinary Indian passport holders visiting Iran with effect from 22 November 2025. This measure is intended to prevent further misuse of the facility by criminal elements Palau has introduced a 30-day visa-free entry scheme for Indian citizens. Philippines introduces a two-tier visa-free for Indians from 19 May 2025, offering a non-extendable 14-day visa-free stay to all Indians, and a 30-day visa-free stay to Indians holding valid visas or permanent residence from Australia, Canada, Japan, Schengen countries, Singapore, US or UK. Thailand launched a digital arrival card for visitors from 1 May 2025, which can be filled up to three days before the arrival date. United Arab Emirates have decided to extend the visa on arrival scheme to holders of a valid residence permit from Singapore, Japan, South Korea, Australia, New Zealand, and Canada, effective 13 February 2025. Ukraine reintroduces e-Visa system for Indian travellers from 17 February 2025. Malaysia extends visa-free for Indians until 31 December 2026. Israel introduces e-Visa system for Indian tourists from January 2025.
2024	The UAE has implemented a visa-on-arrival option for Indian citizens holding a valid UK, US, or EU visit or residence visa, or a USA Green Card. This allows for a stay of up to 14 days, with the option to extend for an additional 14 days. Additionally, travellers can opt for a 60-day, non-extendable visa-on-arrival after paying the required fees per UAE regulations. Sri Lanka has announced visa-free travel for Indian citizens from October 2024. Kenya and Iran announced visa-free travel for Indian citizens starting in January 2024. Thailand implemented visa-free entry for tourism, with stays up to 60 days. This will be in effect for six months starting from 15 July 2024 . Japan starts issuing single entry e-Visas for all Indian citizens and foreign nationals residing in India starting 1 April 2024. This visa type is only for short stay tourism. Philippines started e-Visas for Indian citizens after a successful pilot program.
2023	Angola has announced a list of 98 countries, including India, whose citizens can travel visa-free for 30 days (w.e.f 29 September 2023). Thailand has announced a 6-month visa-free travel period for Indian citizens from 10 November 2023 to 10 May 2024, extending further to 11 Nov 2024. Sri Lanka announced free visa for Indians from 1 December 2023 until 31 March 2024, extending further to 31 May 2024. Malaysia announced temporary visa-free for Indians from 1 December 2023 until 31 December 2024. Belarus announced visa-free travel for Indians (with EU countries and Schengen area visa holders), provided they are not transiting to or from (including airside) Russia and are arriving at Minsk International Airport. Japan announced in July 2023 that Indian passport-holders who reside in Brazil, Cambodia, Canada, Saudi Arabia, Singapore, South Africa, Taiwan, UAE, UK, US can apply for a single entry e-Visa for tourism purposes only. Russia launched a single entry e-Visa for 16 days from the 1st of August 2023. Egypt announced single and multiple entry e-visas for solo Indian travellers in April 2023. Jordan E-visas can now be obtained at Ministry of Interior E-Services Site. However, nationals of India can still obtain a visa on arrival.
2022	South Africa finally launched an e-visa system for all Indian travellers in February 2022. However, this is not fully implemented and is not applicable to residents in several European countries. The website doesn't function well and travelers are advised to check with their local South African embassy Oman announced visa-free entry to Indian citizens for tourism, as of 12 January 2022 for up to 10 days. Afterwards, the period of stay in Oman was changed to 14 days. Albania announced visa-free travel to Indian citizens as of 23 April 2022 which is extended till the end of 2022. They then introduced e-visa applications for Indians. Morocco announced an e-visa to Indian nationals for tourism and business purposes on 1 August 2022.
2021	Egypt has been offering e-visa for Indian nationals in tour groups since 2021. They announced e-visa for solo travels in April 2023. United States announced that all eligible Indian citizens could now participate in the Global Entry program for expedited entry into the US.
2020	Ukraine has begun offering e-visas for tourism to Indian travelers from 14 August 2020. Subsequently, because of a sudden military conflict in Feb 2022, they suspended all air travel over their airspace.
2019	Sri Lanka has announced free visa-on-arrival for Indian tourists, effective 1 August 2019. Ecuador suddenly imposed visa restrictions on Indian nationals effective 12 August 2019 because of misuse of visa-free travel. Barbados has announced visa-free tourist and business visas for Indian nationals. Kazakhstan first introduced a procedure for obtaining a single-entry visa in electronic format on 1 January 2019. They then announced a 14-day visa-free travel allowance for tourism and business on 7 July 2022. Kazakhstan announced a 14-day visa exemption to Indian nationals for tourism and business purposes on 8 July 2022. Chile introduced a visa on arrival for Indian citizens already in possession of a valid US visa/residency with at least 6 months validity in April 2019. Argentina allowed Indian nationals with a valid US visa with at least 6 months validity to apply for an ETA since March 2019. Jordan announced that all Indian passport bearers became eligible for a visa on arrival, (but only with a valid Schengen, UK, US or Canadian visa) in December 2019,
2018	All Indian passport bearers became eligible for a visa on arrival to Rwanda in January 2018, Zimbabwe, Angola, the Bahamas (but only with a valid Schengen, UK, US or Canadian visa) on 24 April 2018 and Iran on 22 July 2018. Myanmar has announced visa-on-arrival for Indian tourists entering the country through the international airports of Nay Pyi Taw, Yangon and Mandalay beginning 12 December 2018. Bangladesh and India both agreed to abolish visa application fees for each other's citizens in 2018. Thus Indian passport holders who apply for a Bangladeshi visa in India do not have to pay the visa application fee. Russia announced an e-Visa status for parts of the Russian Far East: Primorye and the rest of Khabarovsk, Sakhalin, Chukotka, and Kamchatka regions in 2018, this was later expanded to include Saint Petersburg in 2020. Vietnam and Uzbekistan in 2018 introduced e-Visa for Indian nationals.
2017	The requirement for a visa was removed by Indonesia in July 2017, Qatar in August 2017, Tunisia in October 2017 and Gabon in October 2017, Kyrgyzstan introduced online visitor visas in September 2017 (but they send an email after the application requiring a Letter of Invitation from a Tour company which costs at least USD 50), and Armenia in November 2017. Indian citizens already in possession of a valid UK, United States, Canada or Schengen visa became eligible to apply for a visa on arrival to Oman in October 2017, Armenia in November 2017, and Chile (US visa only) in April 2019.

== Visa requirements map ==
Visa requirements for Indian citizens holding ordinary passports Republic of India Freedom of movement Visa not required Visa not required (conditional) Visa available both on arrival or eVisa Visa on arrival eVisa Visa required Admission restricted

== Visa requirements ==
Country	Visa requirement	Allowed stay	Notes (excluding departure fees)
Afghanistan	eVisa	30 days	e-Visa : Visitors must arrive at Kabul International (KBL).; Visitors may apply for an e-Visa in other countries, excluding some countries of residence (include India).
Albania	eVisa	90 days	Visa Exempt for person: (a) having a valid residence permit in one of the Schengen countries, US or UK.; (b) having a valid multiple entry Schengen visa and the visa must have been used once in a Schengen area country.; (c) holding a 10-year UAE residence permit with a remaining validity of more than one year.; (d) holder of a valid multiple-entry US or UK visa, which must have been used once in the country of issuance.
Algeria	Visa required		Persons may be denied entry if entering with a passport containing visas or stamps issued by Israel.; Visitors on tours organized to some southern regions by an approved travel agency may obtain a visa on arrival for up to 30 days.
Andorra	Visa required		Andorra has no visa regime, but is only accessible through France and Spain: a double- or multiple-entry Schengen Visa or a Schengen Area residence permit is required.
Angola	Visa not required	30 days	Angola unilaterally exempted a visa to 98 countries including India on 29 September 2023.; 30 days per trip, but no more than 90 days within any 1 calendar year for tourism purposes only.; Visitors must have a return/onward ticket and a hotel reservation confirmation.; An International Certificate of Vaccination is required.
Antigua and Barbuda	eVisa		Visa on arrival for 100 USD, for a maximum stay of 30 days for valid visa holders or residents of Canada, the Schengen Area member states, UK, and US.
Argentina	Visa required		Indian passport holders with a valid U.S. visa of type B2 / J / B1 / O / P (P1-P2-P3) / E / H-1B, or a U.S. Green Card can travel to Argentina visa-free.
Armenia	eVisa	90 days	Diplomatic passport holders are not required to hold a visa for a maximum stay of 90 days. The passport needs to be valid during the whole period of stay in Armenia.; Visa On Arrival is available for the holder of a valid residence permit or valid visa issued by the EU and Schengen member states, Australia, Canada, Japan, New Zealand, the Republic of Korea, UK, US, the Russian Federation or a valid residence permit (physical card or sticker) issued by the United Arab Emirates, Saudi Arabia, Kuwait, Qatar, Bahrain or Oman.
Australia and territories	Online Visa required		May obtain visa through the online portal (Online Visitor e600 visa).; Transit visa: required, can apply online.; From 1 October 2024, Indian citizens have been able to apply for a Work and Holiday, subclass 462, visa to explore Australia.
Austria	Visa required		Schengen Visa needed.; Transit Visa: Not Required
Azerbaijan	eVisa	30 days	30 USD payable upon arrival at International Airports, and visa kiosks will provide an e-Visa. Prior eVisa required for entry via land borders.; Passports with Armenian entry stamp are subject to extra security screening subjective to immigration officer.
Bahamas	eVisa	3 months	Visa on arrival for all Indian nationals who have valid Schengen, UK, US, and/or Canadian visas.
Bahrain	eVisa / Visa on arrival	14 days	14 days to 1-year multiple-entry visa (max. stay 90 days).; Visa on arrival for Gulf Cooperation Council residents with a validity of more than 3 months and occupation should not be labourers.; Visa on arrival for holders of valid visit visa to UAE, UK, US, KSA (excluding Hajj & Umrah visa), Schengen or US Green Card for 2 weeks Single Entry or Three months Multiple Entry.
Bangladesh	Visa required		Due to bilateral agreements, Diplomatic Passport and Official Passport holders are eligible for a visa on arrival if entering by air, road or sea but not train.; Visa fee waived for regular or ordinary passport holders who apply in India.
Barbados	Visa not required	90 days	Visa requirements lifted on 17 May 2019.
Belarus	eVisa		Visas are waived if you hold a visa for EU countries and the Schengen area.; National visa may be substituted with a Schengen visa or a national visa of country of EU, and if arriving and departing via Minsk International Airport.; Foreigner shall create a personal account on the website «Е-Pasluga» (including the mobile application «Е-Pasluga») and submit a visa application, choosing a corresponding service – service code 3.04.01, service name «E-visa issuance». An e-visa application is considered within seven calendar days. Entry to the Republic of Belarus with an e-visa is possible through all international checkpoints (road and rail checkpoints, through the checkpoints «Minsk National Airport», «Airport Brest», «Airport Gomel», «Airport Grodno», «Airport Mogilev», «Airport Vitebsk»).
Belgium	Visa required		Schengen Visa needed.; Transit Visa - Not Required. Verify the list of countries here: https://dofi.ibz.be/en/themes/entry/border-control/visa/visa-type-airport-transit-visa
Belize	Visa required		Permanent residents and holders of multiple entry visa of the US or Canada may obtain a visa on arrival. Holders of a valid visa issued by a Schengen Member state are visa exempt for a maximum stay of 90 days.
Benin	eVisa	30 days	Must have an international vaccination certificate.; Three types of electronic visa are offered: the e-Visa valid for 30 days for a single entry (50 EUR), the e-Visa valid for 30 days for several (multiple) entries (75 EUR), and the e-Visa valid for 90 days to make several (multiple) entries (100 EUR).
Bhutan	Freedom of Movement	Unlimited (only for border areas)	Indian nationals may also use their Voter ID card with photograph or Indian Passport to enter Bhutan by air and land.; Permits required for travel beyond the border, subject to a BTN 1200/day Sustainable Development Fee.; Apply permit through official website https://immi.gov.bt/
Bolivia	Visa required		Visitors must complete an online application, but still need to visit the embassy to receive the visa in their passport.
Bosnia and Herzegovina	Visa required	6 months	National visa may be substituted with a valid multiple-entry visa issued by an EU or Schengen Area member state or the US.
Botswana	eVisa	3 months	
Brazil	Visa required		
Brunei	Visa required		
Bulgaria	Visa required		Schengen Visa Required
Burkina Faso	eVisa		
Burundi	Online Visa / Visa on arrival	1 month	
Cambodia	eVisa / Visa on arrival	30 days	Fee of 36 USD applicable.
Cameroon	eVisa		
Canada	Visa required		National visa may be substituted with a US permanent resident card. Travelers with a US permanent resident card no longer require an Electronic Travel Authorization (ETA) as of 26 April 2022.; Transit visa: required.
Cape Verde	Visa on arrival		Visa on arrival.See Extract from Order No. 244/GMAI/2026, published in the Official Gazette, 2nd Series, No. 14, of January 23, 2026.
Central African Republic	Visa required		
Chad	eVisa		
Chile	Visa required		Indian nationals, holders of a US visa of any kind (including Green Card) - except for type C (transit) - with at least six months validity at the time of arrival, shall be exempt from obtaining a Temporary Admission Visa (previous Tourist Visa) to enter Chile.
China	Visa required		24-hour visa-free transit through any international airports of China, allows domestic travel through different airports. (Note: Custom procedure for 24-hour visa-free transit is required in principle, except in Beijing (both Capital and Daxing), Shanghai Pudong, Hangzhou, Xiamen, Guangzhou, Shenzhen, Chengdu Tianfu and Xi'an if no leaving of international transit areas.); Due to border disputes, Chinese embassy and consulate generals only issue stapled visas for Arunachal Pradesh, Jammu and Kashmir and Ladakh citizenships, and prohibit officiers of Arunachal Pradesh to apply visas, however Indian government doesn't recognize stapled visas as valid travel documents for departure, which caused conflicts regarding athletes.
Colombia	Online Visa		National visa may be substituted with a valid C or D visa issued by a Schengen Area member state or a valid visa (with 180 days left) issued by the US (except for C1 transit visas).
Comoros	Visa on arrival	45 days	
Republic of the Congo	Visa required		Visa not required if presenting a V.I.P invitation letter.
Democratic Republic of the Congo	eVisa	7 days	Visa on arrival if a letter (visa volant) issued by the Ministry of Interior and Security is presented.
Costa Rica	Visa required		National visa may be substituted with a valid visa issued by the US or with a multiple-entry visa issued by Canada or a member state of the European Union.
Côte d'Ivoire	eVisa	3 months	e-Visa holders must arrive via Port Bouet Airport.; e-Visa must be collected at Félix Houphouët-Boigny Airport in Abidjan.
Croatia	Visa required		Schengen Visa needed.
Cuba	eVisa	90 days	
Cyprus	Visa required		National visa may be substituted with a double- or multiple-entry C visa issued by a Schengen Area member state.
Czech Republic	Visa required		Schengen Visa needed.; Transit Visa: Required
Denmark	Visa required		Schengen Visa needed.
Djibouti	eVisa	90 days	
Dominica	Visa not required	6 months	
Dominican Republic	Visa required		National visa may be substituted with a valid visa issued by Canada, US or any EU member state.
Timor-Leste	Visa on arrival	30 days	
Ecuador	Online Visa		
Egypt	eVisa	30 days	Passengers with a residence permit issued by a GCC Member State can obtain a visa on arrival for a maximum stay of 30 days. The residence permit must be valid for a minimum of 6 months from the arrival date.; If travelling as a part of an organized tourist group that consists of at least 10 persons and holding both onward and return flight tickets, booked accommodation and a signed Letter of Guarantee (LG) from an Egyptian travel agency, a visa on arrival in Egypt can be obtained; Air transit passengers with a confirmed onward ticket for a flight to a third country within 48 hours do not need visas. Leaving the airport is permitted for passengers with transit time between 6 and 48 hours. Passengers with transit time of less than 6 hours may leave the transit area but not the airport; however, this exemption does not apply when transiting through Alexandria (HBE).; EgyptAir passengers can obtain free 96 hour transit visa at EgyptAir transit visa office at cairo airport.
El Salvador	Visa required		Since October 2023, El Salvador imposes a 1000 USD transit visa fee for Indian nationals.
Equatorial Guinea	eVisa		
Eritrea	Visa required		
Estonia	Visa required		Schengen Visa needed.
Eswatini	Visa required		
Ethiopia	eVisa / Visa on arrival	90 days	Visa on arrival is obtainable only at Addis Ababa Bole International Airport.; e-Visa holders must arrive via Addis Ababa Bole International Airport.; e-Visa is available for 30 or 90 days.
Fiji	Visa not required	4 months	
Finland	Visa required		Schengen Visa needed.; Transit Visa: Not required [Schengen category A visa (airport transit visa) is not required for Indian passport holders travelling through the international transit area of an airport during a stopover or a change of flights. ]
France	Visa required		Schengen Visa Required; Transit Visa: Not Required [Effective 10 Apr 2026, travellers enroute to a third country (outside the EU), remaining in the international zone of French airports, do not require a category A transit visa.]
Gabon	eVisa	90 days	e-Visa holders must arrive via Libreville International Airport.
Gambia	Visa not required	90 days	
Georgia	eVisa	30 days	Reinstated from May 2023.; National visa may be substituted with a valid visa or residence permit issued by US, UK, Japan, Canada, Australia, New Zealand, Israel, South Korea, Ireland, Schengen, and GCC countries, whose holders may be granted visa-free entry for 90 days in any 180 days.
Germany	Visa required		Schengen Visa Required; Transit Visa: Not Required [Effective 3 June 2026, a Schengen category A visa (airport transit visa) is not required for stays of up to 24 hours within the international area.]
Ghana	Visa required		
Greece	Visa required		Schengen Visa Required
Grenada	Visa not required	3 months	
Guatemala	Visa required		National visa may be substituted with a valid visa issued by Canada, the US, or a Schengen Area member state.
Guinea	eVisa	90 days	
Guinea-Bissau	Visa on arrival	90 days	
Guyana	Visa required		Visa on arrival if holding a letter of invitation from sponsor or host.
Haiti	Visa not required	3 months	
Honduras	Visa required		National visa may be substituted with a valid visa issued by Canada, the US or a Schengen Area member state.
Hungary	Visa required		Schengen Visa Required
Iceland	Visa required		Schengen Visa Required; Transit Visa: Not Required [Schengen category A visa (airport transit visa) is not required for Indian passport holders travelling through the international transit area of an airport during a stopover or a change of flights].
Indonesia	e-VOA / Visa on Arrival	30 days	30 days for tourism purposes, IDR 500000 fee.
Iran	eVisa	30 days	As of 18 November 2025, visa free-access is revoked and Indian citizens must have visa prior to arrival.
Iraq	eVisa	30 days	
Ireland	Visa required		National visa may be substituted with a UK C visa holders if they have first entered the United Kingdom and have been granted a stay of 180 days in the United Kingdom. They are visa exempt for a maximum stay of 90 days in Ireland or until the end of the period of stay granted in the United Kingdom, whichever is shorter. Entry permitted only if first point of entry to the Common Travel Area is in the UK. May transit without a visa.
Israel	eVisa	90 days	The Ministry of Tourism of Israel has launched a digital e-visa system for Indian passport holders who are resident in India, effective 1 January 2025.
Italy	Visa required		Schengen Visa Required; Transit Visa: Not Required [Schengen category A visa (airport transit visa) is not required for Indian passport holders travelling through the international transit area of an airport during a stopover or a change of flights.]
Jamaica	Visa not required		
Japan	eVisa		Residents in India, except those exempted from a short-term visa, will need to submit their documents through VFS.; Residents in Australia, Brazil, Cambodia, Canada, Saudi Arabia, Singapore, South Africa, Taiwan, UK and US can also apply for a single entry e-Visa for Tourism purposes only and travel to Japan by air.; Passengers transiting to a third country may be granted a Shore Pass on arrival, at the discretion of Japanese immigration, allowing visa-free entry for up to 72 hours when no suitable same-day onward connection is available; a confirmed onward ticket and entry documents for the next destination are required.
Jordan	eVisa / Visa on arrival	30 days	
Kazakhstan	Visa not required	14 days	
Kenya	Electronic Travel Authorisation	90 days	Applications can be submitted up to 90 days prior to travel and must be submitted at least 3 days in advance.; eTA fee is 32.50 USD.; Proof of reservation at the hotel where visitors plan to stay is required (if staying with friends, an invitation letter is also acceptable).; Yellow fever vaccination certificate is required if coming from endemic countries.; Can also be entered on an East Africa tourist visa issued by Rwanda or Uganda.
Kiribati	Visa not required	90 days	Maximum period of stay may not exceed 90 days in any given 12-month period.
North Korea	Visa required		
South Korea	Visa required		Tourist / Transit visa for 30 days may be granted to permanent residents or valid visa holders of US, Australia, Canada, New Zealand or Schengen countries when they are traveling from or traveling to any of these countries and satisfy the conditions mentioned here https://overseas.mofa.go.kr/in-en/brd/m_20446/view.do?seq=748786&page=1.
Kuwait	Visa required		UK, US, SCHENGEN Visa or Residence Permit Holders can apply for evisa including tourism purposes at https://kuwaitvisa.moi.gov.kw/; Residents of Gulf Cooperation Council in certain professions can apply e-Visa for a fee of 3 KWD.
Kyrgyzstan	eVisa	60 days	[CAUTION - they send an email after the e-visa application requiring a letter of invitation from a tour company which costs at least USD 50] Electronic visa holders must arrive via Manas International Airport or Osh Airport or through land crossings with China (at Irkeshtam and Torugart), Kazakhstan (at Ak-jol, Ak-Tilek, Chaldybar, Chon-Kapka), Tajikistan (at Bor-Dobo, Kulundu, Kyzyl-Bel) and Uzbekistan (at Dostuk).; Citizens of India arriving through the checkpoint at Manas International Airport can stay visa-free for up to 7 days if they have a voucher (which can be purchased upon arrival at Manas International Airport) with a value of at least 500 USD and a return air ticket to their country of citizenship or to a third country with the right to re-enter visa-free after 21 days from the date of departure; or with long-term visas (for a period of more than 3 years) of the United States of America, the Kingdom of Great Britain and Northern Ireland, the Schengen zone, where they can stay visa-free for 7 days with the right to re-enter visa-free after 21 days from the date of departure.
Laos	eVisa / Visa on arrival	30 days	18 (Note: Savannakhet Airport; Lanetoui - Mengkang (China); Meuangmom - Wan Pong (Myanmar); Banvang - Ban Khok Phai (Thailand); Namngeun - Huay Kon (Thailand); Paksan - Bueng Kan (Thailand); Paktaphan - Pak Saeng (Thailand); Pangmon - Ban Huak (Thailand); Phoudou (Thailand); Dak ta ock - Nam Giang (Vietnam); La Lai (Vietnam); Namkan (Vietnam); Namphao - Cau Treo (Vietnam); Namsoy - Na Meo (Vietnam); Naphao - Cha Lo (Vietnam); Pahang - Long Sap (Vietnam); Panghok - Tây Trang (Vietnam); Phoukeua - Bo Y (Vietnam)) of the 33 border crossings are only open to regular visa holders.; e-Visa may be used to enter Laos through the Luang Prabang, Pakse and Vientiane international airports, 3 Thai-Lao Friendship Bridges (Note: Vientiane (Friendship Bridge 1); Savannakhet (Friendship Bridge 2); Bokeo (Friendship Bridge 4)), in Boten (road and railroad), and in Vientiane (at Khamsavath railway station).; Visa on arrival is available at the Luang Prabang, Pakse and Vientiane international airports, 4 Thai-Lao Friendship Bridges (Note: Vientiane (Friendship Bridge 1); Savannakhet (Friendship Bridge 2); Khammouane (Friendship Bridge 3); Bokeo (Friendship Bridge 4)) and 7 border crossings. (Note: Nongnokkheane - Trapeang Kriel (Cambodia); Boten - Bo han (China); Golden Triangle/Samliemkham (Thailand); Khamsavath railway station (Thailand); Namheuang - Ban Na Kraseng (Thailand); Vang tao - Chongmek (Thailand); Dansavan - Lao Bảo (Vietnam))
Latvia	Visa required		Schengen Visa Required
Lebanon	Visa required		In addition to a visa, an approval should be obtained from the immigration department of the General Directorate of General Security (Diréction Générale de la Sûreté Générale).
Lesotho	Visa required		
Liberia	e-VOA	3 months	
Libya	eVisa		
Liechtenstein	Visa required		Schengen Visa Required
Lithuania	Visa required		Schengen Visa Required
Luxembourg	Visa required		Schengen Visa Required
Madagascar	eVisa / Visa on arrival	90 days	For stays of 61 to 90 days, the visa fee is 59 USD.
Malawi	eVisa	30 days	
Malaysia	Visa not required	30 days	Until 31 December 2026, visa-exempt for Indians for 30 days for tourist purposes only.; Submission of the Malaysia Digital Arrival Card (MDAC) within 3 days is mandatory. The online MDAC form is available- https://imigresen-online.imi.gov.my/mdac/main?registerMain
Maldives	Visa not required	90 days	
Mali	Visa required		
Malta	Visa required		Schengen Visa Required
Marshall Islands	Visa on arrival	90 days	
Mauritania	eVisa		
Mauritius	Visa not required	90 days	
Mexico	Visa required		National visa may be substituted with a valid visa or permanent residence documents issued by the US, Canada, Japan, UK, or Schengen Area member state to enter Mexico for tourism, transit, or business purposes.; Transit Visa: required.
Micronesia	Visa not required	30 days	
Moldova	Visa required		National visa may be substituted with a valid ('C' or 'D') visa or a valid residence permit issued by the United Kingdom, Schengen Area or European Union member state for visits up to 90 days.; Exempt for Indians holding a valid residence permit or valid visas (excluding transit visas) of US, Canada.; Indian citizens can apply for a visa online without needing an invitation letter.; e-Visa is issued for a maximum of 90 days in the previous 180-day period plus forthcoming 90-day period (effectively, maximum 90 days in any 270-day period).
Monaco	Visa required		
Mongolia	eVisa / Visa on arrival	30 days	
Montenegro	Visa required	30 days	National visa may be substituted with a valid visa or residence permit issued by a Schengen Area member state, UK, Ireland, the US, Japan, Canada, New Zealand, or Australia.; Holder of Asia-Pacific Economic Cooperation Business Travel card (APEC).
Morocco	eVisa	30 days	
Mozambique	eVisa	30 days	Visa on arrival if holding a printed confirmation from the Immigration Authority (SENAMI) Headquarters in Maputo, indicating that a visa has been approved before departure.
Myanmar	eVisa / Visa on arrival	28 days / 30 days	e-Visa holders must arrive via Yangon, Nay Pyi Taw or Mandalay airports or via land border crossings with Thailand — Tachileik, Myawaddy and Kawthaung or India — Rih Khaw Dar and Tamu.; e-Visa available for both tourism (allowed stay is 28 days) or business (allowed stay is 70 days) purposes.; Visa on arrival can be issued for tourism at Yangon, Nay Pyi Taw or Mandalay airport and is valid for 30 days (1 year from 30 August 2023)
Namibia	eVisa	3 months	
Nauru	Visa required		
Nepal	Freedom of movement	Unlimited	Indian nationals may also use their Voter ID card with photograph or Indian Passport to enter Nepal by air and land.; Indian citizens may live and work freely in Nepal under the terms of the 1950 Indo-Nepal Treaty of Peace and Friendship. This treaty is implemented in law through section 14 of the Nepal Immigration Act 1992, regulations 3, 20 and 44A of the Nepal Immigration Regulation 1994, and section 8.4 the Nepal Immigration Procedures 2008.
Netherlands	Visa required		Schengen Visa Required; Transit Visa: Not Required [Schengen category A visa (airport transit visa) is not required for Indian passport holders travelling through the international transit area of an airport during a stopover or a change of flights.]
New Zealand	Visa required		Holders of an Australian Permanent Resident Visa or Resident Return Visa may be granted a New Zealand Resident Visa on arrival permitting indefinite stay (pursuant to the Trans-Tasman Travel Arrangement), subject to meeting character requirements and obtaining an Electronic Travel Authority prior to departure.
Nicaragua	Visa required		Passengers must have a valid visa issued by Nicaragua. Passengers with a passport that states El Salvador, Guatemala, Honduras or Nicaragua as their place of birth do not need a visa. Passengers can obtain an e-visa before departure at https://tramitesconsulares.mint.gob.ni , which can be verified at https://evisa-verifica.mint.gob.ni/public/verificar_visa
Niger	Visa required		
Nigeria	eVisa	30 days	
North Macedonia	Visa required		National visa may be substituted with a valid double- or multiple-entry C visa issued by a Schengen Area member state or by a British, Canadian, or U.S. visa for maximum stay of 15 days. Proof of onward travel required. Note that the visa must be 'inserted in the passport' precluding digital and card resident permits.
Norway	Visa required		Schengen Visa Required; Transit Visa: Not Required [Schengen category A visa (airport transit visa) is not required for Indian passport holders travelling through the international transit area of an airport during a stopover or a change of flights.]
Oman	Visa required		14-days Visa on arrival for Indians holding a valid Australia, Canada, Japan, UK, US or Schengen visa or residence permit. Also for Gulf Cooperation Council residents.
Pakistan	Admission restricted		Visa issuance and travel heavily restricted after 2025 Pahalgam Attack.; Visa not required for Pilgrims visiting Shri Kartarpur Sahib (since 2019, closed after the Pahalgam attack).; Sikhs (Indian passport holders) living outside India and holding a right to live in a 3rd country can apply for e-visa under special Pilgrim category on Nadra website.
Palau	Free Visa on arrival	30 days	
Panama	Visa required		National visa may be substituted with a valid multiple entry visa issued by the US (including permanent residents), UK, Canada, Australia, Japan, South Korea, Singapore, or an EU member state, which has been used at least once to enter those countries and with at least one year validity remaining at the time of entry into Panama.
Papua New Guinea	eVisa	30 days	
Paraguay	Visa required		
Peru	Visa required		Nationals of India who have a valid Australia, Canada, UK, US or Schengen Area visa or permanent resident permit can stay a visa-free up to 180 days within any 365-day period for tourist or business purposes. The visa must be valid for a minimum of 6 months from the arrival date.
Philippines	Visa not required / eVisa	14 days / 59 days	14-day visa-free for tourism only.; Visa-free for holders of a valid Australia, Canada, Japan, Schengen, Singapore, UK or US visa or resident visa for 30 days (only for tourism).; Visa required for other travel purposes, including transit.; A single or multiple entry eVisa for stays of up to 59 days is also available.
Poland	Visa required		Schengen Visa Required; Transit Visa: Not Required [Schengen category A visa (airport transit visa) is not required for Indian passport holders travelling through the international transit area of an airport during a stopover or a change of flights.]
Portugal	Visa required		Schengen Visa Required; Transit Visa: Not required [Schengen category A visa (airport transit visa) is not required for Indian passport holders travelling through the international transit area of an airport during a stopover or a change of flights].
Qatar	Visa not required	30 days	A visa waiver for 30 days can be granted on arrival, given the following conditions: Must have a confirmed return ticket.; Must provide a confirmed hotel reservation booked through the Discover Qatar website for the entire stay, subject to a minimum of a two-night booking.
Romania	Visa required		Schengen Visa Required
Russia	eVisa	30 days	An application must be made 40 to 4 days before the intended entry date.
Rwanda	Visa not required	30 days	May enter with East Africa Tourist Visa (100 USD), valid for 90 days and multiple entries in Kenya, Rwanda, and Uganda.
Saint Kitts and Nevis	Electronic Travel Authorisation	3 months	
Saint Lucia	Visa on arrival	6 weeks	
Saint Vincent and the Grenadines	Visa not required	3 months	
Samoa	Entry permit on arrival	90 days	
San Marino	Visa required		No border control but accessible only via Italy; thus, Italian visa rules apply.
São Tomé and Príncipe	eVisa		
Saudi Arabia	Visa required		Tourist visa on arrival for holders of valid Schengen, UK and US visa. Visitors must arrive through national carrier of Saudi Arabia.; Visa on arrival if holding two or multiple entry short-stay valid visa issued by UK, US or a Schengen member state for stays of no more than 90 days.; Saudi Arabia announced 96 hour free transit visa for passengers of saudia or flynas when stopover the country valid for 90 days.; Visitors can get visa on arrival at any international airport in Saudi Arabia but they must have a credit card to pay a fee amounting to SR 440 (Dh 431) as cash is not accepted. They will be allowed to stay for 90 days at a stretch and can enter the Kingdom of Saudi Arabia multiple times during the validity period of their visit visa.; Eligible visitors may obtain a tourist visa through the Package Visa programme by purchasing an integrated travel package from approved travel and tourism service providers via visitsaudi.com. The package combines an e visa, flights and licensed hotel accommodation into a single digital booking.The package must meet a minimum value of SAR 4,000 (around Rs 1.01 lakh) for the first two days, with an additional SAR 1,000 (around Rs 25,400) for every extra day. The programme was launched as a pilot in selected markets including India, Bangladesh, Egypt, Indonesia, Jordan and Mexico.
Senegal	Visa not required	90 days	
Serbia	eVisa	90 days	90 days within any 180-day period. Transfers allowed.; Invitation letter in the case of a private visit, i.e. proof of accommodation or proof of itinerary from the travel agency in the case of a tourist visit. Even if you intend NOT to use a travel agency the embassy will insist on an invitation letter.; National visa may be substituted by a valid visa OR residence permit issued by any EU member state, Schengen Area member state, UK, or US, for a period not exceeding 90 days in a 180-day period and within the validity of the visa or residence permit.
Seychelles	Electronic Border System	3 months	Application can be submitted up to 30 days before travel.; Visitors must upload a reservation confirmation(s) for each visitor's location of stay in Seychelles.; Yellow fever vaccination certificate is required if coming from endemic countries.; Payment of the fee (EUR 10) by credit or debit card.; Valid for one journey only and it expires once exit the country.
Sierra Leone	eVisa / Visa on arrival	3 months / 30 days	
Singapore	Visa required		May obtain online e-Service through eligible authorized travel agencies. or through local sponsors (Singapore citizen or permanent residents).; Indian nationals who are entering Singapore by any mode of transport but departing only via air or sea and having a valid visa or long-term pass with validity at least 1 month from entry date from countries such as Australia, Canada, Germany, Japan, New Zealand, UK, US and Switzerland who are in transit to or from any third country may be conditionally eligible for 96-hours Visa-Free Transit Facility (VFTF).
Slovakia	Visa required		Schengen Visa Required
Slovenia	Visa required		Schengen Visa Required; Need to submit the application at Slovenian Embassy/consulate in New Delhi.
Solomon Islands	Visa required		
Somalia	eVisa	30 days	All visitors must have an approved Electronic Visa (eTAS) before the start of their journey.
South Africa	Electronic Travel Authorisation	90 days	Who are entering South Africa through either OR Tambo International Airport, Cape Town International Airport and Lanseria International Airport.
South Sudan	eVisa		Obtainable online 30 days single entry for 100 USD, 90 days multiple entry for 200 USD and 180 days multiple entry for 350 USD.; Printed visa authorization must be presented at the time of travel.
Spain	Visa required		Schengen Visa Required; Transit Visa: Not Required [From 4 March 2026 onwards, the need for an airport Transit Visa has been eliminated for Indian nationals transiting through international zones of airports in Spain.]
Sri Lanka	Free ETA / Visa on arrival	30 days	
Sudan	Visa required		
Suriname	eVisa	90 days	
Sweden	Visa required		Schengen Visa Required
Switzerland	Visa required		Schengen Visa Required; Transit Visa: Not Required [Schengen category A visa (airport transit visa) is not required for Indian passport holders travelling through the international transit area of an airport during a stopover or a change of flights.]
Syria	eVisa		
Tajikistan	eVisa	60 days	e-Visa holders can enter through all border points.; A color scan of the passport must be uploaded; photographs taken with a phone are not accepted.; A letter of invitation may be requested at the discretion of the consulate. If required, the applicant will be notified by email with instructions to upload the document. In cases of solo travel, a cover letter explaining that the applicant is independently organizing their itinerary without assistance from a travel agency—and is therefore unable to provide an invitation letter—may be accepted at the consulate’s discretion.
Tanzania	eVisa / Visa on arrival	90 days	
Thailand	Visa not required	30 days	Visa-free for a stay of up to 30 days (reduced to 30 days from 60 days effective 15 Sep 2026).; From 1 May 2025, a digital arrival card must be filled, up to three days before arrival (TDAC).
Togo	eVisa	15 days	
Tonga	Visa required		
Trinidad and Tobago	Visa not required	90 days	
Tunisia	Visa not required (conditional)		Groups of five or more people booking through a travel agency may enter without a visa. They must have a return ticket and a confirmed hotel reservation.
Turkey	Visa required		Conditional single-entry eVisa issued for the period of 30 days to holders of a valid visa or residence permit issued by one of the Schengen member countries, US, UK, or Ireland.
Turkmenistan	Visa required		10-day visa on arrival if holding a letter of invitation provided by a company registered in Turkmenistan with a prior approval from the Foreign Ministry. Visitors can apply to extend their stay for an additional 10 days.; When transiting between two non-bordering countries, visitors can obtain a Turkmenistan transit visa for a five-day stay. This must be applied for in advance at the Turkmenistan Embassy. Visitors must also submit copies of the visas for the country of entry into Turkmenistan and the country of departure from Turkmenistan. Visa fee is 20 USD.
Tuvalu	Visa on arrival	1 month	
Uganda	eVisa	3 months	May enter with East Africa Tourist Visa, valid in Rwanda, Uganda, and Kenya for stays of up to 90 days (fee: USD 100).; e-Visa must be obtained prior to arrival.
Ukraine	eVisa	30 days	Reintroduces e-Visa system for Indian travelers from 17 February 2025 which was suspended due to the Russia-Ukraine Conflict.
United Arab Emirates	Visa required		May apply using 'Smart service'.; Duration: Generally, visitation visas are granted for 30, 60, or 90 days, contingent upon the particular conditions and the nature of the relationship between the sponsor and the guest; Indians holding a valid US or UK or EU visit visa or residence visa which is valid for a minimum of 6 months can obtain a visa on arrival for a maximum stay of 14 days.; Indians holding a residency permit from Singapore, Japan, South Korea, Australia, New Zealand, or Canada are also eligible for a visa on arrival.; Cost for 14 days visa is AED 100 (subject to change). They can apply to extend their stay for an additional 14 days for AED 250 (subject to change).; Visitors normally require a sponsor but visas can also be arranged online through an airline if they are arriving on Air Arabia, Air Astana, Emirates, Etihad (and Air Baltic and Air Serbia), flydubai, Turkish Airlines, and Indigo Airlines.
United Kingdom and Crown dependencies	eVisa		Transit visa: Required, unless holding a valid visa or permanent residence in Canada, New Zealand, Australia, EU or the USA.; Visa not required if holding a biometric Irish visa endorsed with "BC" or "BC BIVS".; eVisa can be applied through HM Government services portal UK-GOV; Other exemptions apply for Visa-free Direct Airside Transit.
United States	Visa required		Transit visa required.
Uruguay	Visa required		Visa issued free of cost.; No visa required for diplomatic passports.; (5) Prior authorization required
Uzbekistan	eVisa	30 days	5-day visa-free transit at the international airports if holding a confirmed onward ticket for a flight to a third country.
Vanuatu	Visa not required	120 days	
Vatican City	Visa required		Schengen visa required. Entry can be made only from Italy; thus, Italian visa rules apply.
Venezuela	eVisa		
Vietnam	eVisa		e-Visa is valid for 90 days and multiple entry.; In November 2023, the authorities in Vietnam has proposed to waive visas for citizens of India.
Yemen	Visa required		Yemen introduced an e-Visa system for visitors who meet certain eligibility requirements (group travel of 10 or more people, business trips, and transit etc.).
Zambia	eVisa	90 days	
Zimbabwe	eVisa / Visa on arrival	1 month	

=== Dependent, disputed, or restricted territories ===
Unrecognized or partially recognized countries

Territory	Conditions of access	Notes
Abkhazia	Visa required	Tourists from all countries (except Georgia) can visit Abkhazia for a period not exceeding 24 hours as part of an organized tourist group.
Kosovo	Visa required	Schengen zone visa or residence permit valid for 15 days. Serbia will not recognize the entry if coming from Kosovo without entering it first via Serbia. No Visa needed, if a holder of a valid travel documents issued by EU Member and Schengen States, United States of America, Canada, Australia and Japan. Visa not required for holders of a valid biometric residence permit issued by one of the Schengen member states or a valid multi-entry Schengen Visa, a holder of a valid Laissez-Passer issued by United Nations Organizations, NATO, OSCE, Council of Europe or European Union a holder of a valid travel documents issued by EU Member and Schengen States, United States of America, Canada, Australia and Japan based on the 1951 Convention on Refugee Status or the 1954 Convention on the Status of Stateless Persons, as well as holders of valid travel documents for foreigners (max. 15 days stay)
Northern Cyprus	Visa not required	3 months
Palestine	Visa not required	Arrival by sea to Gaza Strip not allowed.
Sahrawi Arab Democratic Republic	Visa regime undefined	Undefined visa regime in the Western Sahara controlled territory.
Somaliland	Visa required	
South Ossetia	Visa required	To enter South Ossetia, visitors must have a multiple-entry visa for Russia and register their stay with the Migration Service of the Ministry of Internal Affairs within 3 days.
Taiwan	Visa required	14 day online travel authority is available to the citizens of India with permanent residency or valid visa or expired, of Australia, Canada, Japan, New Zealand, Schengen Convention countries, United Kingdom or United States. But it must not have expired for more than 10 years prior to the date of arrival in Taiwan as well as visas marked "void", "canceled" or "canceled without prejudice" are not eligible.
Transnistria	Visa not required	Registration required after 24h.

Dependent and autonomous territories

Territory	Conditions of access	Notes
China
Hong Kong	Electronic Travel Authorization	14 days
Macau	Visa not required	30 days
Denmark
Faroe Islands	Visa required	
Greenland	Visa required	
France
Clipperton Island	Special permit required	
French Guiana	Visa required	
French Polynesia	Visa required	
Guadeloupe	Visa required	
Martinique	Visa required	
Saint Barthélemy	Visa required	
Saint Martin	Visa required	
Mayotte	Visa required	
New Caledonia	Visa required	
Réunion	Organized trips	15 days if trip arranged through approved travel agencies.
Saint Pierre and Miquelon	Visa required	
Wallis and Futuna	Visa required	
Netherlands
Aruba; Bonaire Curaçao; Sint Eustatius; Saba	Visa required	Visa not required if holding a valid multiple-entry visa or residence permit issued by Canada, Ireland, UK or US.; Visa not required if holding a multiple-entry short-stay Schengen visa, an authorization for temporary stay, or a residence permit of a Schengen country.; Visa not required if holding a residence permit of Overseas France.
Sint Maarten	Visa required	Visa not required if holding a valid multiple-entry visa or residence permit issued by Canada, Ireland, UK or US.; Visa not required if holding a multiple-entry short-stay Schengen visa, an authorization for temporary stay, or a residence permit for a Schengen country.; Visa not required if holding a residence permit or visa for Saint Martin (French part).; Visa not required if holding a residence permit of Overseas France.
New Zealand
Cook Islands	Visa not required	31 days
Niue	Visa not required	30 days
Tokelau	Permit required	
Norway
(Norway) Jan Mayen	Permit required	Permit issued by the local police required for staying for less than 24 hours and permit issued by the Norwegian police for staying for more than 24 hours.
(Norway) Svalbard	Visa not required	Unlimited period under Svalbard Treaty but it is practically impossible to board a flight/ferry to Svalbard without entering Norway. Hence a double entry Schengen visa would be required to go and come back from Svalbard to mainland Norway.
United Kingdom
Akrotiri and Dhekelia	Visa required	The visa policy is the same as for Cyprus, which follows the visa policy of the Schengen Area.
Anguilla	eVisa	A visa is required, except for holders of a visa issued by the United Kingdom. A valid UK, US, or Canada visa or residence permit can be used to enter Anguilla.
Bermuda	Visa required	Visa required, except for a maximum stay of 3 months for holders of a multiple-entry visa issued by Canada, US or the UK, valid for at least 45 days beyond the period of intended stay in Bermuda.
British Indian Ocean Territory	Special permit required	
British Virgin Islands	Visa not required	30 days
Cayman Islands	Visa required	Visa not required for permanent residents or holders of visas issued by the US, Canada or the UK, arriving directly from that country, except that residents of Canada may arrive from the US or Canada.
Falkland Islands (Malvinas)	Visa required	
Gibraltar	Visa required	UK Visa (6 months or more), or Multiple entry Schengen visa covers entry. Neither a permanent nor a temporary Schengen Residence Permit qualify you for entry.
Montserrat	Visa not required	6 months
Pitcairn Islands	Visa not required	14 days visa-free and landing fee 35 USD or tax of 5 USD if not going ashore.
Saint Helena	eVisa	
Ascension Island	eVisa	3 months within any year period.
Tristan da Cunha	Permission required	Permission to land required for 15/30 pounds sterling (yacht/ship passenger) for Tristan da Cunha Island or 20 pounds sterling for Gough Island, Inaccessible Island or Nightingale Islands.
South Georgia and the South Sandwich Islands	Permit required	Pre-arrival permit from the Commissioner required (72 hours/1 month for 110/160 pounds sterling).
Turks and Caicos Islands	Visa not required	90 days
United States
American Samoa	Entry permit required	
Guam	Visa required	Visa not required if holding a valid multiple-entry visa issued by US.
Northern Mariana Islands	Visa required	Visa not required if holding a valid multiple-entry visa issued by US.
Puerto Rico	Visa required	Visa not required if holding a valid multiple-entry visa issued by US.
U.S. Virgin Islands	Visa required	Visa not required if holding a valid multiple-entry visa issued by US.
Antarctica and adjacent islands
Special permits required for Bouvet Island, British Antarctic Territory, French Southern and Antarctic Lands, Argentine Antarctica, (Australia) Australian Antarctic Territory, (Antártica Chilena Province) Chilean Antarctic Territory, (Australia) Heard Island and McDonald Islands, (Norway) Peter I Island, (Norway) Queen Maud Land, (New Zealand) Ross Dependency.

Other territories

- Australia. Ashmore and Cartier Islands - Special authorisation required.
- Belarus. Belovezhskaya Pushcha National Park – Visa not required for 3 days; must first obtain an electronic pass.
- Belarus. Brest and Grodno – Visa not required for 10 days
- Crimea - Visa issued by Russia is required.
- China. Hainan - Visa required. Available at Haikou Meilan International Airport and Sanya Phoenix International Airport.
- China. Tibet Autonomous Region - Tibet Travel Permit required (10 USD).
- Colombia. San Andrés and Leticia - Visitors arriving at Gustavo Rojas Pinilla International Airport and Alfredo Vásquez Cobo International Airport must buy tourist cards on arrival.
- Ecuador. Galápagos - 60 days; Visitors must pre-register to receive a 20 USD Transit Control Card (TCT).
- Eritrea outside Asmara - To travel in the rest of the country, a Travel Permit for Foreigners is required (20 Eritrean nakfa).
- Fiji. Lau Province - Special permission required.
- (Greece) Mount Athos - Special permit required (4 days: 25 euro for Orthodox visitors, 35 euro for non-Orthodox visitors, 18 euro for students). There is a visitors' quota: maximum 100 Orthodox and 10 non-Orthodox per day and women are not allowed.
- Iran. Kish Island - Visa not required; 14 days.
- Kazakhstan. Closed cities - Special permission required for the town of Baikonur and surrounding areas in Kyzylorda Oblast, and the town of Gvardeyskiy near Almaty.
- North Korea outside Pyongyang – Special permit required. People are not allowed to leave the capital city, tourists can only leave the capital with a governmental tourist guide (no independent moving).
- Malaysia. Sabah and Sarawak – Visa not required. These states have their own immigration authorities and passport is required to travel to them, however the same visa applies.
- Maldives outside Malé – Permission required. Tourists are generally prohibited from visiting non-resort islands without the express permission of the Government of Maldives.
- Pakistan – Kartarpur Corridor: No visa required, USD 20 permit required.
- Russia – Several closed cities and regions in Russia require special authorization.
- (Saudi Arabia) Mecca and Medina – Special access required. Non-Muslims and those following the Ahmadiyya religious movement are strictly prohibited from entry.
- (South Korea) Jeju Island – Visa-free entry for 30 days for Indian citizens provided arriving directly at Jeju Island.
- Sudan. Darfur – Separate travel permit is required.
- Sudan outside Khartoum – All foreigners traveling more than 25 kilometers outside of Khartoum must obtain a travel permit.
- Tajikistan. Gorno-Badakhshan Autonomous Province – OIVR permit required (15+5 Tajikistani Somoni) and another special permit (free of charge) is required for Lake Sarez.
- Turkmenistan. Closed cities – A special permit, issued prior to arrival by Ministry of Foreign Affairs, is required if visiting the following places: Atamurat, Cheleken, Dashoguz, Serakhs and Serhetabat.
- United States. Closed city of Mercury, Nevada, United States – Special authorization is required for entry into Mercury.
- United States. United States Minor Outlying Islands – Special permits required for Baker Island, Howland Island, Jarvis Island, Johnston Atoll, Kingman Reef, Midway Atoll, Palmyra Atoll and Wake Island.
- Venezuela. Margarita Island – Visa not required. All visitors are fingerprinted.
- Vietnam. Phú Quốc – Visa not required for 30 days.
- Yemen outside Sanaa or Aden – Special permission needed for travel outside Sanaa or Aden.
- (United Nations) UN Buffer Zone in Cyprus – Access Permit is required for travelling inside the zone, except Civil Use Areas.
- (United Nations) Korean Demilitarized Zone - Restricted area.
- (United Nations) UNDOF Zone and Ghajar - Restricted area.

== Reciprocity ==
The Indian Government has not drafted any laws to mandate reciprocity in visa agreements with other countries. While a very small number of bilateral agreements have concluded with reciprocity for visa arrangements, a large number of visa relationships continue to be highly skewed to one side or the other.

In 2015, Iran revoked visa-on-arrival for Indian citizens after it was included as one of the eight countries in India's Prior Reference Category, which would be excluded from India's visa liberalisation plans for foreign tourists. The other countries on the list at the time were Pakistan, Afghanistan, Iraq, Somalia, Nigeria and Sudan.

=== Full reciprocity ===
India has, by default, achieved full reciprocity in visa-free or e-Visa privileges with following countries or regions:

- Bhutan (Freedom of Movement)
- Nepal (Freedom of Movement)
- Maldives (Visa not required, for 90 days)
- Albania (e-Visa required)
- Antigua and Barbuda (e-Visa required)
- Armenia (e-Visa required)
- Azerbaijan (e-Visa required)
- Bahamas (e-Visa required)
- Benin (e-Visa required)
- Botswana (e-Visa required)
- Bolivia (e-Visa required)
- Cambodia (e-Visa required)
- Colombia (e-Visa required)
- Djibouti (e-Visa required)
- Ivory Coast (e-Visa required)
- Equatorial Guinea (e-Visa required)
- Gabon (e-Visa required)
- Georgia (e-Visa required)
- Guinea (e-Visa required)
- Israel (e-Visa required)
- Japan (e-Visa required)
- Kenya (e-Visa required)
- Kyrgyzstan (e-Visa required)
- Lesotho (e-Visa required)
- Malawi (e-Visa required)
- Malaysia (e-Visa required)
- Morocco (e-Visa required)
- Mozambique (e-Visa required)
- Myanmar (e-Visa required)
- Papua New Guinea (e-Visa required)
- Philippines (e-Visa required)
- Russia (e-Visa required)
- Senegal (e-Visa required)
- South Africa (e-Visa required)
- Sri Lanka (e-Visa required)
- Suriname (e-Visa required)
- Thailand (e-Visa/Visa on Arrival)
- Togo (e-Visa required)
- Uganda (e-Visa required)
- Ukraine (e-Visa required)
- Uzbekistan (e-Visa required)
- Vietnam (e-Visa required)
- Zambia (e-Visa required)

=== Partial reciprocity ===
India has achieved partial reciprocity with following countries, where Indian Immigration rules afford the citizens of the following countries slightly lesser visa privileges than what the following countries provide for Indian Citizens:

Country	Visa requirement for Indian nationals to visit the country	Visa requirement to visit India
Angola	Visa not required for 30 days	e-Visa
Barbados	Visa not required for 90 days	e-Visa
Bolivia	Visa on arrival for 90 days, charged at La Paz airport. Prior visa is free of cost at Bolivian embassy.	e-Visa for 60 days
Burundi	Visa on Arrival for 30 days	e-Visa
Cambodia	Visa on arrival for 30 days	e-Visa for 60 days
Djibouti	Visa on arrival	e-Visa for 60 days
Dominica	Visa not required	e-Visa for 60 days
Fiji	Visa not required	e-Visa for 60 days
Grenada	Visa not required	e-Visa for 60 days
Guyana	Visa on arrival	e-Visa for 60 days
Haiti	Visa not required	e-Visa for 60 days
Jamaica	Visa not required	e-Visa for 60 days
Jordan	Visa on arrival	e-Visa for 60 days
Kazakhstan	Visa not required for 14 days	e-Visa
Kiribati	Visa not required for 90 days	e-Visa
Laos	Visa on arrival for 30 days	e-Visa for 60 days
Madagascar	Visa on arrival	e-Visa for 60 days
Malawi	Visa on arrival	e-Visa for 60 days
Malaysia	Visa on arrival of RM200 if arriving from Thailand, Indonesia, Brunei or Singapore for 15 days	e-Visa for 60 days
Mauritius	Visa not required	e-Visa for 60 days
Micronesia	Visa not required	e-Visa for 60 days
Mongolia	Visa on Arrival for 30 days	e-Visa
Myanmar	Conditional visa on arrival for business, workshops, events, etc. It is unclear if this exemption is also valid for tourist class visas. However, full reciprocity exists only in providing E-visa for tourism purpose.	e-Visa for 60 days
Nauru	Visa on arrival	e-Visa for 60 days
Palau	Visa on arrival	e-Visa for 60 days
Rwanda	Visa not required for 30 days	e-Visa
Saint Kitts and Nevis	Visa not required	e-Visa for 60 days
Saint Lucia	Visa on arrival	e-Visa for 60 days
Saint Vincent and the Grenadines	Visa not required	e-Visa for 60 days
Samoa	Visa not required for 60 days	e-Visa
Seychelles	Visa on arrival	e-Visa for 60 days
Sri Lanka	e-Visa/Visa on arrival	e-Visa for 60 days
Tanzania	Visa on arrival	e-Visa for 60 days
Thailand	e-Visa/Visa on arrival	e-Visa for 60 days
Timor-Leste	Visa on arrival	e-Visa for 60 days
Trinidad and Tobago	Visa not required	e-Visa for 60 days
Tuvalu	Visa on arrival	e-Visa for 60 days
Vanuatu	Visa not required	e-Visa for 60 days
Zimbabwe	Visa on arrival	e-Visa for 60 days

== Non-visa restrictions ==
=== Blank passport pages ===
Many countries require a minimum number of blank pages to be available in the passport being presented, typically one or two pages. Endorsement pages, which often appear after the visa pages, are not counted as being valid or available.

=== Vaccination ===
Cover of the new International Certificate of Vaccination issued by the Bureau of Quarantine in the Philippines since 2021

The African countries of Angola, Benin, Burkina Faso, Burundi, Cameroon, Central African Republic, Democratic Republic of the Congo, Republic of the Congo, Côte d'Ivoire, Gabon, Ghana, Guinea-Bissau, Mali, Niger, Sierra Leone and Togo, South Sudan and Uganda, along with French Guiana in South America, require all incoming passengers older than nine months to one year, to have a current International Certificate of Vaccination or Prophylaxis.

Some other countries require vaccination only if the passenger is coming from an infected area or has visited one recently or has transited for 12 hours in those countries: Algeria, Botswana, Cabo Verde, Chad, Djibouti, Egypt, Eswatini, Ethiopia, Gambia, Ghana, Guinea, Lesotho, Libya, Equatorial Guinea, Eritrea, Madagascar, Malawi, Mauritania, Mauritius, Mozambique, Namibia, Nigeria, Papua New Guinea, Seychelles, Somalia, South Africa, Sudan, Tunisia, Uganda, Tanzania, Zambia and Zimbabwe.

=== Passport validity length ===
Very few countries, such as Paraguay, just require a valid passport on arrival.

However many countries and groupings now require only an identity card – especially from their neighbours. Other countries may have special bilateral arrangements that depart from the generality of their passport validity length policies to shorten the period of passport validity required for each other's citizens or even accept passports that have already expired (but not been cancelled).

Some countries, such as Japan, Ireland and the United Kingdom, require a passport valid throughout the period of the intended stay.

In the absence of specific bilateral agreements, countries requiring passports to be valid for at least 6 more months on arrival include Afghanistan, Algeria, Anguilla, Bahrain, Bhutan, Botswana, British Virgin Islands, Brunei, Cambodia, Cameroon, Cape Verde, Cayman Islands, Central African Republic, Chad, Comoros, Costa Rica, Côte d'Ivoire, Curaçao, Ecuador, Egypt, El Salvador, Equatorial Guinea, Fiji, Gabon, Guinea Bissau, Guyana, Haiti, India, Indonesia, Iran, Iraq, Israel, Jordan, Kenya, Kiribati, Kuwait, Laos, Madagascar, Malaysia, Marshall Islands, Mongolia, Myanmar, Namibia, Nepal, Nicaragua, Nigeria, Oman, Palau, Papua New Guinea, Peru, Philippines, Qatar, Rwanda, Samoa, Saudi Arabia, Singapore, Solomon Islands, Somalia, Sri Lanka, Sudan, Suriname, Tanzania, Thailand, Timor-Leste, Tokelau, Tonga, Turkey, Tuvalu, Uganda, United Arab Emirates, Vanuatu, Venezuela, and Vietnam.

Countries requiring passports valid for at least 4 months on arrival include Micronesia and Zambia.

Countries requiring passports with a validity of at least 3 months beyond the date of intended departure include Azerbaijan, Bosnia and Herzegovina, Honduras, Montenegro, Nauru, Moldova and New Zealand. Similarly, the EEA countries of Iceland, Liechtenstein, Norway, all European Union countries (except Ireland) together with Switzerland also require 3 months validity beyond the date of the bearer's intended departure unless the bearer is an EEA or Swiss national.

Countries requiring passports valid for at least 3 months on arrival include Albania, North Macedonia, Panama, and Senegal.

Bermuda requires passports to be valid for at least 45 days upon entry.

Countries that require a passport validity of at least one month beyond the date of intended departure include Eritrea, Hong Kong, Lebanon, Macau, the Maldives and South Africa.

==== Maximum passport age ====
Countries of the Schengen area require non-EU passports to be less than 10 years old upon entry.

=== Criminal record ===
Some countries, including Australia, Canada, Fiji, New Zealand and the United States, routinely deny entry to non-citizens who have a criminal record, while others impose restrictions depending on the type of conviction and the length of the sentence.

=== Persona non grata ===
The government of a country can declare a diplomat persona non grata, banning them from entering the country or expelling them if they have already entered. In non-diplomatic use, the authorities of a country may also declare a foreigner persona non grata permanently or temporarily, usually because of unlawful activity.

=== Israeli stamps ===
Kuwait, Lebanon, Libya, and Yemen do not allow entry to people with passport stamps from Israel or whose passports have either a used or an unused Israeli visa, or where there is evidence of previous travel to Israel such as entry or exit stamps from neighbouring border posts in transit countries such as Jordan and Egypt.

To circumvent this Arab League boycott of Israel, the Israeli immigration services have now mostly ceased to stamp foreign nationals' passports on either entry to or exit from Israel (unless the entry is for some work-related purposes). Since 15 January 2013, Israel no longer stamps foreign passports at Ben Gurion Airport. Passports are still (as of 22 June 2017) stamped at Erez when passing into and out of Gaza.

Iran refuses admission to holders of passports containing an Israeli visa or stamp that is less than 12 months old.

=== Biometrics ===
Several countries mandate that all travellers, or all foreign travellers, be fingerprinted on arrival and will refuse admission to or even arrest travellers who refuse to comply. In some countries, such as the United States, this may apply even to transit passengers who merely wish to change planes rather than go landside.

Fingerprinting countries/regions include Afghanistan, Argentina, Brunei, Cambodia, China, Ethiopia, Ghana, Guinea, India, Japan, Kenya (both fingerprints and a photo are taken), Malaysia upon entry and departure, Mongolia, Saudi Arabia, the Schengen Area, Singapore, South Korea, Taiwan, Thailand, Uganda, the United Arab Emirates and the United States.

Many countries also require a photo be taken of people entering the country. The United States, which does not fully implement exit control formalities at its land frontiers (although long mandated by its own legislation), intends to implement facial recognition for passengers departing from international airports to identify people who overstay their visa.

Together with fingerprint and face recognition, iris scanning is one of three biometric identification technologies internationally standardised since 2006 by the International Civil Aviation Organization (ICAO) for use in e-passports and the United Arab Emirates conducts iris scanning on visitors who need to apply for a visa. The United States Department of Homeland Security has announced plans to greatly increase the biometric data it collects at US borders. In 2018, Singapore began trials of iris scanning at three land and maritime immigration checkpoints.

== Visa exemptions ==
(This section is under construction, please help update it.)

In some instances, a Visa Exemption permits entry in lieu of obtaining a Visa / Entry Visa if in possession of the following Visas or Permanent Relationships; this is not limited to entitlements or provisions laid down by the country's law. For example: Indian citizens holding valid US visa are permitted to enter Mexico on the basis of their US visa, without the need for a Mexican visa.

=== United States of America ===
Indian citizens in possession of a valid United States Multiple Entry Visa in their passport may enter the following country(ies) visa-free: Albania, Argentina, Bahamas, Belarus, Belize, Bolivia, Chile, Colombia, Costa Rica, Cuba, Dominican Republic, Georgia, Guatemala, Honduras, Mexico, Moldova, Montenegro, North Macedonia, Panama, Peru, Philippines, Serbia, Singapore, South Korea, Turkiye (e-Visa).

Indian citizens in possession of a valid United States Multiple Entry Visa in their passport may enter the following territory(ies) visa-free: Anguilla, Aruba, Bermuda, Bonaire, Cayman Islands, Curaçao, Kosovo, Sint Eustatius, Sint Maarten, Saba.

Indian citizens in possession of a valid United States Multiple Entry Visa in their passport may enter the following country(ies) and gain a visa-on-arrival: Antigua and Barbuda, Bosnia and Herzegovina, Armenia, Bahrain, Nicaragua, Oman, Saudi Arabia, United Arab Emirates.

=== Canada ===
Indian Citizens in possession of a valid Canada Multiple Entry Visa in their passport may enter the following country(ies) visa-free: Bahamas, Costa Rica, Cuba, Dominican Republic, Georgia, Guatemala, Honduras, Mexico, Moldova, Montenegro, Nicaragua, North Macedonia, Panama, Peru, Philippines, Singapore, South Korea.

Indian citizens in possession of a valid Canada Multiple Entry Visa in their passport may enter the following territory(ies) visa-free: Anguilla, Aruba, Bermuda, Bonaire, Cayman Islands, Curaçao, Kosovo, Sint Eustatius, Sint Maarten, Saba.

Indian citizens in possession of a valid Canada Multiple Entry Visa in their passport may enter the following country(ies) and gain a visa-on-arrival: Antigua and Barbuda, Armenia, Belize, Oman, United Arab Emirates.

Canada Permanent Resident: Holders of a Canadian Permanent Resident can visit certain countries visa-free, for more details refer Canada permanent resident card

=== United Kingdom ===
Indian citizens in possession of a valid UK Multiple Entry Visa in their passport may enter the following country(ies) visa-free: Albania, Bahamas, Georgia, Ireland, Mexico, Moldova, Montenegro, North Macedonia, Panama, Peru, Philippines, Serbia, Singapore, Turkiye (e-Visa).

Indian citizens in possession of a valid UK Multiple Entry Visa in their passport may enter the following territory(ies) visa-free: Anguilla, Aruba, Bermuda, Bonaire, Cayman Islands, Curaçao, Gibraltar, Kosovo, Sint Eustatius, Sint Maarten, Saba.

Indian citizens in possession of a valid UK Multiple Entry Visa in their passport may enter the following country(ies) and gain a visa-on-arrival: Antigua and Barbuda, Armenia, Oman, Saudi Arabia, United Arab Emirates.

=== Schengen Region ===
Indian citizens in possession of a valid Multiple Entry Visa from Schengen Member States in their passport may enter the following country(ies) visa-free: Albania, Andorra, Bahamas, Belarus, Belize, Bosnia and Herzegovina, Colombia, Cyprus, Georgia, Guatemala, Honduras, Mexico, Moldova, Montenegro, North Macedonia, Peru, Philippines, Serbia, South Korea, Turkiye (e-Visa).

Indian citizens in possession of a valid Multiple Entry Visa from Schengen Member States in their passport may enter the following territory(ies) visa-free: Akrotiri and Dhekelia, Aruba, Bonaire, Cayman Islands, Curaçao, Gibraltar, Kosovo, Sint Eustatius, Sint Maarten, Saba.

Indian citizens in possession of a valid Multiple Entry Visa from Schengen Member States in their passport may enter the following country(ies) and gain a visa-on-arrival: Antigua and Barbuda, Armenia, Bahrain, Nicaragua, Oman, Saudi Arabia.

=== European Union ===
Indian citizens in possession of a valid Multiple Entry Visa from EU Member States in their passport may enter the following country(ies) visa-free: Belarus, Bosnia and Herzegovina, Costa Rica, Cuba, Dominican Republic, Moldova, Panama, Serbia.

Indian citizens in possession of a valid Multiple Entry Visa from EU Member States in their passport may enter the following territory(ies) visa-free: Kosovo

Indian citizens in possession of a valid Multiple Entry Visa from EU Member States in their passport may enter the following country(ies) and gain a visa-on-arrival: Armenia, United Arab Emirates.

European Union Family Member - Indian Citizens who are traveling with or joining their EU family members in the European Union in a Country other than where their family member is a citizen of does not require a Visa to enter and enjoy the same entry rights and stay, however, this would be difficult to prove and as a result, entry could be refused.

Visa should be applied for in advance which is usually with no or minimal requirements to meet if the applicant is a family member of an EU Citizen. For instance, a person who wants to travel with their spouse to France where their spouse is a Citizen of the Republic of Lithuania should apply for a Schengen Visa in advance or where a person wants to join their Lithuanian spouse who resides in France should also apply for a Schengen Visa in order to prove their right and avoid misconception. In most cases, airlines will not permit travel without a visa.

There is no time limit a family member can stay (indefinite stay), they must just enter before the Visa expires if joining their family or traveling at the same time. There are no costs involved either. European Union citizens and their Indian family members will need to apply for settled or pre-settled status if they wish continue residing in the UK after 31 December 2020. Settled Status can be granted when the applicant has resided in the UK for 5 years and is valid indefinitely. In order to maintain settled status, people must visit the UK every 5 years. Pre-Settled status is granted when the applicant has resided in the UK for less than 5 years and is valid for 5 years.

In order to maintain pre-settled status, people must visit the UK every 2 years. However, applicants would have to meet continuous residence until they reach 5 years if they want to qualify for settled status after 31 December 2020. It will not be possible to be granted another pre-settled Visa.

Schengen Visa (Long Stay) - Holders of a Valid Long Stay Category D Visa who arrive in the Schengen European country of their Visa and apply for a Residence Card shortly after arriving will be able to use their EU residence permit / card for travel within the Schengen States, if granted.

European Union (Residence Card Holders)

Indian citizens holding any EU country Residence card (Student, Work, Dependent, Golden Visa etc.) have a. Full freedom to travel in Schengen zone b. No limit on the number of days in other EU/Schengen countries tries

Indian nationals who hold EU Residence Card also have access to above countries list corresponding to multiple entry Schengen Visa from any EU Member state, however #b above is extra as the Schengen Visa issued to non EU residents is capped at 90/180 days rule.

=== GCC visa ===
Visa-free or Visa on Arrival to : Egypt, Georgia, Armenia, Azerbaijan, Uzbekistan, Kyrgyzstan, Oman, Bahrain (GCC residents only, for Bahrain). GCC Visa details

=== United Arab Emirates ===
United Arab Emirates now giving 1 month, 2 months and 3 months visit visas for Indian nationalities.

== For travel statistics ==
According to the statistics these are the numbers of Indian visitors to various countries in 2017 (unless otherwise noted)

Foreign travel statistics
Destination	Number of visitors
American Samoa (Note: Data for 2022)	400
Angola	9,170
Antarctica (Note: Data for 2017)	222
Antigua and Barbuda	366
Australia (Note: Data for 2025)	451,524
Austria (Note: Counting only guests in tourist accommodation establishments.)	186,684
Azerbaijan	166,944
Barbados (Note: Data for 2016)	900
Belgium	44,898
Bhutan	130,299
Bolivia	989
Bosnia and Herzegovina	5,236
Botswana (Note: Data for 2023)	14,528
Brazil	16,916
Cambodia	34,016
Canada	261,801
Cayman Islands (Note: Data for arrivals by air only.)	292
Chile	4,468
China	799,100
Colombia	5,402
Congo (Note: Data for 2012)	2,373
Costa Rica	7,415
Croatia	55,745
Dominica	97
Dominican Republic	4,649
Eswatini	6,867
France	524,055
French Polynesia	379
Georgia	59,732
Germany	231,244
Guam	8
Hong Kong	392,853
Hungary	33,134
Indonesia	422,045
Israel	58,000
Italy	225,000
Jamaica	1,834
Japan (Note: Data for 2024)	243,687
Jordan	57,720
Kazakhstan	157,845
Kyrgyzstan	19,600
Laos	4,343
Latvia	5,476
Lebanon	15,610
Macao	148,121
Madagascar	2,234
Malaysia	1,365,387
Maldives	83,019
Mali (Note: Data for 2014)	1,500
Mauritius	86,294
Mexico	59,020
Mongolia	1,888
Montenegro	1,131
Myanmar	34,628
Nepal (Note: Data for arrivals by air only.)	75,124
Netherlands	155,000
New Zealand (Note: Data for 2026)	83,239
Oman	321,161
Panama	6,748
Papua New Guinea	4,293
Peru	7,201
Philippines	107,278
Qatar	333,708
Romania	16,753
Russia	130,400
Seychelles	13,518
Singapore	1,272,069
Slovakia	6,805
South Africa	85,639
South Korea	123,416
Spain	141,122
Sri Lanka	356,729
Suriname	1,045
Taiwan	40,846
Tanzania	69,876
Thailand	1,595,754
Timor-Leste	799
Turkey	86,996
Ukraine	23,173
United Arab Emirates	2,073,000
United Kingdom	525,000
United States (Note: Total number includes tourists, business travelers, students, exchange visitors, temporary workers and families, diplomats and other representatives and all other classes of nonimmigrant admissions (I-94).)	2,944,840
Uzbekistan (Note: Data for 2015)	18,100
Zambia	25,517
Zimbabwe	5,421

== See also ==
- Visa policy of India
- Indian nationality law
- Overseas Citizenship of India
