= Mithakali =

Mithakali Mithakhali
- Neighbourhood
- Location in Ahmedabad, Gujarat, India Mithakali (Gujarat) Mithakali (India)
- Coordinates: 23.034243°N 72.562223°E
- Country: India
- State: Gujarat
- Metro: Ahmedabad

Government
  - Body: Ahmedabad Municipal Corporation

Languages
  - Official: Gujarati, Hindi, English
- Time zone: UTC+5:30 (IST)
- PIN: 380009
- Civic agency: Ahmedabad Municipal Corporation
- Website: gujaratindia.com

Mithakali is a part of Ahmedabad city. Once a fairly undistinguished and quiet place, it has recently seen a real estate explosion.

Today, Mithakali is home to the Crosswords book store chain, the Pantaloons department store chain, the Westside stores chain which is a Tata company, the Subway sandwich store, Natural Ice cream, an Adidas showroom and many other big names that are opening up in Ahmedabad. Mahatma Gandhi International School is also based in this area.

A multi-speciality hospital Medi-Surge is located in Mithakali. Mithakhali Multi Sports Complex is an Indoor Stadium located in the area and was built in 2007 for the purposed of promoting indoor sport in the city.

Mithakali is also a hub for offices and small stores being located at one end of the C.G. Road.

Mitahakli is today used to refer to a large traffic circle with a 6-road intersection:

one road leads to Law Garden, one to C.G.Road, one to the Navrangpura Bus Stand, one to the Mount Carmel railway crossing, one towards Mitahakali village and one to Ashram Road through the Mercury underbridge.

Mithakali was once a village on the meter-gauge railway line. It was swallowed up by Ahmedabad city in its westward growth during the 1970s. On this site there is a map depicting the growth of Ahmedabad city. Though Mithakali is not mentioned, it is in the light-blue zone shown as growing from 1970 to 1989. It is not far from Gandhigram station, which is shown.
