= Indian passport =

Passport of the Republic of India issued to Indian citizens

- Front cover of a current Indian e-biometric passport (2026)

- Data page of an Indian biometric passport (2026)
- Type: Passport
- Issued by: Ministry of External Affairs
- First issued: 1920 (first version); 2019 (Series 2019 Machine Readable Passport); 2025 (Biometric Passport)
- Purpose: Identification, proof of citizenship
- Eligibility: Indian citizenship
- Expiration: 10 years (Adult); 5 years (Minor)
- Cost: Adult (36 pages): ₹2,500; Adult (60 pages): ₹3,500; Minor (36 pages): ₹1,750
- Website: Passport Seva

An Indian passport is a passport issued by the Ministry of External Affairs of the Republic of India to Indian citizens for the purpose of international travel. It enables the bearer to travel overseas and serves as proof of Indian citizenship under the Passports Act, 1967. The Passport Seva (Passport Service) unit of the Consular, Passport & Visa (CPV) Division of the Ministry of External Affairs functions as the issuing authority, and is responsible for the issuance of Indian passports. They are issued at 97 passport offices across India, and at 197 Indian diplomatic missions overseas.

As of 31 December 2023, 6.5 per cent of Indian citizens possessed a valid passport, with Kerala having the highest number of passport holders of all Indian states. The Ministry of External Affairs has been issuing biometric passports exclusively since October 2025, following successive delays in its rollout to ordinary citizens.

Passport ownership in India has historically been relatively limited, though it has increased in recent decades alongside the expansion of issuance centres and improvements in administrative processes.

== History ==
=== British Indian Empire ===
British Indian passports were issued to British subjects of the British Indian Empire, as well as to British subjects from other parts of the British Empire, and subjects of the British protected states in India (i.e. British protected persons of the 'princely states'). These passports were introduced in British India after the First World War. The Indian Passport Act of 1920 required the use of passports, established controls on the foreign travel of Indians, and foreigners travelling to and within India. The passport was based on the format agreed upon by the 1920 League of Nations International Conference on Passports. However, the British Indian passport had very limited usage, being valid for travel only within the British Empire, Italy, Switzerland, Austria, Czechoslovakia, Germany, France, Spain, Norway, Sweden and Holland.

=== Dominion of India ===
The use of the passport was discontinued after the establishment of the Dominion of India and Dominion of Pakistan in 1947, and its bearers were entitled to opt for Indian, Pakistani or British nationality.

Passport laws were made strict in both the countries in 1952. Initially, Indian passports were granted only to "respectable" people. A literacy test was required, and passports were denied to Communist Party of India members. Only in 1967 did the Supreme Court rule that every citizen had the right to a passport.

=== Contemporary ===
Following the end of British rule, the Government of India began issuing national passports to its citizens, replacing British Indian travel documents. Early post-independence passports were simple paper booklets, often handwritten or typewritten, bearing the State Emblem of India and inscriptions in Hindi and English.

A statutory framework for passport issuance was established with the enactment of the Passports Act, 1967, which consolidated the central government's authority over the issuance, refusal, impounding, and revocation of passports. The Act remains the primary legislation governing passports in India. During the 1970s and 1980s, Indian passports were gradually standardized in format and printing. Security features such as lamination of the biographical data page were introduced to reduce tampering and forgery.

In the 1990s, India adopted Machine Readable Passports (MRPs) in accordance with standards established by the International Civil Aviation Organization (ICAO). These passports incorporated a machine-readable zone (MRZ) on the identity page, enabling automated scanning at immigration checkpoints and improving border control efficiency. The introduction of MRPs aligned India with global civil aviation norms and facilitated international travel for Indian citizens.

Select passport offices in India, as well as overseas missions, were authorised to issue regular India-Bangladesh Passport to Indian nationals resident in West Bengal and the North-Eastern States; India-Sri Lanka Passport to Indian nationals resident in Tamil Nadu and Puducherry; and the India-Pakistan Passport to Indian nationals whose ancestral homes lay on the other side of the Radcliffe Line. These three passports respectively permitted travel to Bangladesh, Sri Lanka and Pakistan only and were not valid for travel to other foreign countries. Both India and Bangladesh stopped issuing the India-Bangladesh Passport in 2013 due to changes in ICAO regulations.

Previously, passports were not popular among the masses owing to an elongated and complicated process and limited access to the passport facilitation centres, which were located only in major cities. With the expansion of centres and technological improvements, accompanied by increased outsourcing of professionals and an expanding aspirational middle-class, the percentage is expected to go up.

During the 2010s and early 2020s, additional security features were incorporated into Indian passports, including holographic images, ultraviolet-visible elements, microprinting, and improved security paper.

=== Biometric passport and rollout delay ===
The earliest public indication of top functionaries conferring over the implementation of biometric passports emerged in September 2016, when the then Union Minister of State for External Affairs, V. K. Singh, declared that the Union Government was poised to begin rolling out such passports by the following year, 2017. He also stated that digital passports would be launched in phases. In 2017, the BJP-led Union Government reiterated their commitment to launching biometric passports that year itself.

In the period following the aforesaid declaration and commitment, the implementation of biometric passports all but vanished from official government discourse, with the deadline repeatedly articulated by the Union Government passing unmet. Thereafter, the matter remained largely dormant until January 2019, when Prime Minister Narendra Modi, speaking on the sidelines of the Pravasi Bharatiya Divas, briefly revived the subject by indicating that the biometric passport project was underway.

In June 2019, the Minister of External Affairs, S. Jaishankar, stated that his ministry had proposed the manufacture of biometric passports on an expedited basis, marking one of the first substantive developments on the matter since it had largely receded from public discourse. His statement, however, did not furnish a definitive timeline for rollout, underscoring the continuing indeterminacy surrounding the project and signalling chronic delays marring it.

During the 2022 Budget speech, Finance Minister Nirmala Sitharaman announced that the rollout of biometric passports was expected to take place in 2022–2023.

The implementation timeline envisaged for 2022–2023, however, met the same fate as its predecessors and remained unfulfilled. The issue resurfaced in parliamentary proceedings when Ramasamy Dharmar, a Member of Parliament from Tamil Nadu, sought details regarding the status of the project in August 2024. In his response, Minister of External Affairs S. Jaishankar stated that pilot testing for the issuance of biometric passports was underway at the Regional Passport Offices (RPO) located in Nagpur and Bhubaneswar. By late May 2025, all passport offices across India had finally been equipped with the requisite infrastructure for issuing biometric passports. Consulates and embassies overseas became members of the biometric program in late-October 2025.

As of January 22, 2026, over ten million biometric passports have been issued. The Ministry of External Affairs has further stated that all existing valid non-biometric passports will be phased out and replaced with biometric passports by 2035.

== New Rule for Minor ==
In September 2026, the Ministry of External Affairs amended the Passports Rules, 1980, through the Passports (Amendment) Rules, 2026. Under the amended Rule 12(1A), an ordinary passport containing 36 pages issued to a child below 15 years of age is valid for five years from the date of issue or until the passport holder attains the age of 18 years, whichever occurs earlier. The amendment came into force on 17 September 2026, when it was published in the Gazette of India.[1][2] Global Computers Passport Service

== Types ==
Type	Image	Description
Ordinary passport (Navy Blue cover)		Issued to ordinary citizens for private travel, such as for vacation, study and business trips (36 or 60 pages). It is a "Type PP" passport, where P stands for Personal. Since 2025, all Ordinary Passports issued have been ePassports, with an embedded electronic microprocessor chip into the passport from all Regional Passport Offices of India as well at Indian Embassies and Consulate worldwide.
Official passport (White cover)		Issued to individuals representing the Government of India on official business, including members of the Indian Armed Forces stationed abroad. It is a "Type S" passport, S stands for Service. Since 2021, all Official Passports issued have been ePassports, with a data chip embedded into the document.
Diplomatic passport (Maroon cover)		Issued to Indian diplomats, Members of Parliament, members of the Union Council of Ministers, certain high-ranking government officials and diplomatic couriers, as well as their dependants. Upon request, it may also be issued to high-ranking state-level officials travelling on official business. It is a "Type D" passport, with D standing for Diplomatic. Since 2008, all Diplomatic Passports have been ePassports, with a data chip embedded into the document. Visa requirements normally applied to Indian citizens are waived for Diplomatic Passport holders.

=== Tatkaal and SVP ===
Tatkaal Passports (for urgent needs), and Short Validity Passport (SVP) are also available and these are likely considered Ordinary Passports once issued.

== Physical appearance ==
Early passports dating back to the British Empire were handwritten; in addition, more than a hundred thousand handwritten passports were issued between 1997 and 2000 with 20-year validity dates. These passports have been ruled invalid by the Indian government and holders must replace them with machine-readable versions with validity for 10 years due to ICAO regulations.

Versions prior to 2021 had deep bluish cover with golden coloured printing. The Emblem of India emblazoned in the centre of the front cover. The words भारत गणराज्य in Devanagari and REPUBLIC OF INDIA were inscribed below the Emblem whereas पासपोर्ट in Devanagari and PASSPORT in English were inscribed above the emblem.

The latest version of 2021 has the official name of the country and "Passport" engravings' positions changed mutually. The passport has the passport number perforated. The pages have been re-designed.

The standard passport contains 36 pages, but frequent travellers can opt for a passport containing 60 pages.

Biographic Page of Indian Passport

=== Identity Information Page ===
- The Bio data page contains the following information:
  - Type: P- Stands for "Personal", if it's a Diplomatic or Service passport then it listed as "D" or "S"
  - Code: (listed as IND for "India")
  - Nationality: भारतीय / INDIAN
  - Passport number
  - Surname
  - Given name(s)
  - Date of birth
  - Sex
  - Place of birth
  - Place of issue
  - Date of issue
  - Date of expiry
  - Photo of passport holder
  - Ghost picture of the passport holder (only passports issued since 2013)
  - Signature of the passport holder
  - The information page ends with the Machine Readable Passport Zone (MRZ).

Demographic Page of Indian Passport

=== Demographic Page ===
- Name of Father/Legal Guardian
- Name of Mother
- Name of Spouse
- Address
- Old passport no. with date and place of issue
- File number

== Passport note ==
All passports contain a note in Hindi and English, nominally from the President of India, addressing the authorities of all countries and territories:

इसके द्वारा, भारत गणराज्य के राष्ट्रपति के नाम पर, उन सब से जिनका इस बात से सरोकार हो, यह प्रार्थना एवं अपेक्षा की जाती है कि वे वाहक को बिना रोक-टोक, स्वतंत्रतापूर्वक आने-जाने दें, और उसे हर प्रकार की ऐसी सहायता और सुरक्षा प्रदान करें जिसकी उसे आवश्यकता हो ।

भारत गणराज्य के राष्ट्रपति के आदेश से

These are to request and require in the Name of the President of the Republic of India all those whom it may concern to allow the bearer to pass freely without let or hindrance, and to afford him or her, every assistance and protection of which he or she may stand in need.

By order of the President of the Republic of India

The note bearing page is typically stamped and signed by the issuing authority (Passport Office) in the name of the President of India.

=== Languages ===
The text of Indian Passport is printed in Hindi and English, the two official languages of India. (As per article 343 of the Indian Constitution).

=== Emigration check ===
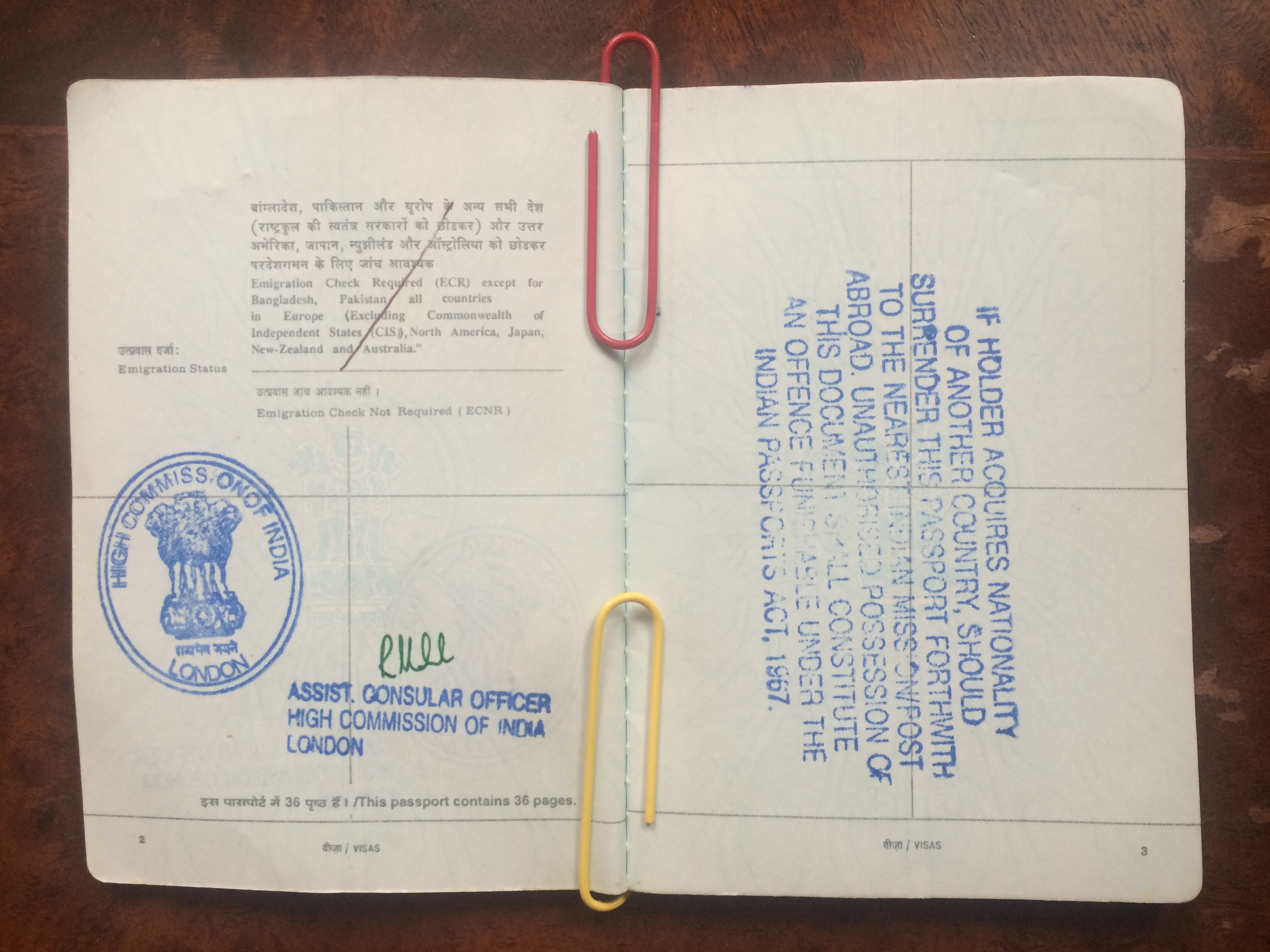
A page in the Indian passport (issued before 2007) with Emigration check note. In passports issued after 2007, a blank first page means Emigration Check Not Required status.

Holders of Emigration Check Required (ECR) type passports need a clearance called an Emigration Check from the Government of India's Protector of Emigrants when going to selected countries on a work visa. This is to prevent the exploitation of Indian workers (especially the unskilled and less-educated) when going abroad, particularly to Middle Eastern countries. ECR type passport holders travelling on a tourist visa do not need a clearance; this is known as an Emigration Check Suspension.

Emigration Check Not Required (ECNR) status passports are granted to:

- Indian nationals born abroad;
- Indian nationals holding at least a matriculation certificate;
- All holders of diplomatic or official passports.
- All gazetted government servants;
- All income-tax payers (including agricultural income-tax payers) in their individual capacity;
- All graduate and professional degree holders (such as architects, doctors, engineers, chartered accountants, scientists, lawyers, etc.);
- Spouses and dependent children of category of certain holders of ECNR passports;
- Seamen in possession of a continuous discharge certificate;
- Sea Cadets and Deck Cadets who have:
  - Passed their final examination on a three-year BSc Nautical Sciences Course at TS Chanakya, Mumbai; and
  - Undergone three months' pre-sea training at any of the government-approved training institutes such as TS Chanakya, TS Jawahar, TS Rehman, Maritime Training Institute (SCI), or National Institute of Personnel Management, Chennai, after production of identity cards issued by the Shipping Master at Mumbai, Kolkata, or Chennai;
- Persons holding a Permanent Immigration Visa, such as visas issued by the UK, USA, or Australia;
- Persons possessing a two years' diploma from any institute recognized by the National Council for Vocational Training (NCVT) or the State Council of Vocational Training (SCVT), or persons holding a three years' diploma or equivalent degree from an institution such as a polytechnic recognized by the union or a state government;
- Nurses possessing qualifications recognised under the Indian Nursing Council Act, 1947;
- All persons above the age of 50 years;
- All persons who have been staying abroad for more than three years (whether in one continuous period or in aggregate), as well as their spouses;
- All children up to the age of 18 years.

In accordance with a ruling by the Ministry of External Affairs, passports issued from 2007 onwards do not have the ECNR stamp affixed; instead, a blank page 2 of the passport is deemed to have been ECNR endorsed. As a result, only ECR stamps are now affixed to Indian passports. For passports issued before January 2007, no notation in the passport means ECR. For passports issued in or after January 2007, no notation in the passport means ECNR. If Emigration Check is Required, there will be an endorsement in the passport regarding ECR.

=== Features ===
Since 25 November 2015, Indian passports that are handwritten or with an original date of expiry extending to 20 years have not been valid under ICAO travel regulations. With more recent Indian passports the personal particulars of the passport holder, that were hitherto printed on the inner cover page, are printed on the second page of the document. Another added security feature in the newer non-handwritten passports is a ghost picture of the holder found on the right side of the second page. Apart from stymieing criminals from printing fake passports, recent changes also help prevent smudging of the document because of inkjet printers.

== Fees ==
The price for a standard passport in India:

- ₹2500 – Fresh issuance or reissue of passport (36 pages, standard size) with 10-year validity.
- ₹3500 – Fresh issuance or reissue of passport (60 pages) with 10-year validity.
- ₹5000 – First time applicant or renewal with expedited ('tatkaal') service (36 pages) with 10-year validity.
- ₹6000 – First time applicant or renewal with expedited ('tatkaal') service (60 pages) with 10-year validity.
- ₹1750 – Fresh passport issuance for minors (below 18 years of Age) with 5-year validity or till the minor attains the age of 18, whichever is earlier.
- ₹5000 – Duplicate passport (36 pages) in lieu of lost, damaged or stolen passport. ₹7500 under expedited ('tatkaal') service.
- ₹6000 – Duplicate passport (60 pages) in lieu of lost, damaged or stolen passport. ₹8500 under expedited ('tatkaal') service.

Indian passports can also be issued outside India, for which fees vary by country.

Senior citizens and children below the age of 8 years get a 10% discount according to the official fee structure.

N

== Issuance ==
=== Passport Seva Kendra ===
In September 2007, the Indian Union Council of Ministers approved a new passport issuance system under the Passport Seva Project. Per the project, front-end activities of passport issuance, dispatch of passports, online linking with police, and Central Printing Unit for centralised printing of passports was place. The new system endeavoured to be 'timely, transparent, more accessible and reliable manner' for passport issuance. The applicant has to apply for fresh/reissue of passport through the Passport Seva system at one of the 77 Passport offices known as "Passport Seva Kendra"s operating throughout the country.

=== Passport Seva Programme (PSP) Version 2.0 ===
During the 13th Passport Seva Divas, held in June 2025, External Affairs Minister S. Jaishankar announced the nationwide implementation of e-passports, marking a significant advancement in the Indian passport infrastructure. He also unveiled updates under the Passport Seva Programme (PSP) Version 2.0, which introduces the use of advanced and emerging technologies aimed at improving efficiency, security, and transparency in the issuance and management of passports.

== Visa requirements ==
Visa requirements for Indian citizens are administrative entry restrictions by the authorities of other states placed on citizens of India.

=== Passport Power Ranking and visa-free travel ===
Visa requirements for Indian citizens Republic of India Freedom of movement Visa not required/ETAS/ETA Visa available both on arrival or online (eVisa) Visa on arrival eVisa Visa required prior to arrival

As of 2025, The Passport Index currently ranks the Indian passport at 66th place out of 199 (Note: "Passports of 193 United Nations member countries and 6 territories (ROC Taiwan, Macao (SAR China), Hong Kong (SAR China), Kosovo, Palestinian Territory and the Vatican) for a total of 199 are considered.") passports on global ranking with a mobility score of 74 (based on visa-free, visa on arrival and ETA access to nations or territories).

As of 2025 Indian citizens have visa-free entry to 71 countries, 56 visa on arrival facility to countries and e-visa or ETA to 64 countries with a UK/US/CA/EU tourist and business visa or residency and permanent residency.

Indian citizens are allowed to live, work, and study in Nepal under the provisions laid out by the Indo-Nepal Treaty of Peace and Friendship, as well as in Bhutan.

=== Foreign travel statistics ===
According to the statistics these are the numbers of Indian visitors to various countries in 2017 (unless otherwise noted)

Foreign travel statistics
Destination	Number of visitors
American Samoa (Note: Data for 2022)	400
Angola	9,170
Antarctica (Note: Data for 2017)	222
Antigua and Barbuda	366
Australia (Note: Data for 2025)	451,524
Austria (Note: Counting only guests in tourist accommodation establishments.)	186,684
Azerbaijan	166,944
Barbados (Note: Data for 2016)	900
Belgium	44,898
Bhutan	130,299
Bolivia	989
Bosnia and Herzegovina	5,236
Botswana (Note: Data for 2023)	14,528
Brazil	16,916
Cambodia	34,016
Canada	261,801
Cayman Islands (Note: Data for arrivals by air only.)	292
Chile	4,468
China	799,100
Colombia	5,402
Congo (Note: Data for 2012)	2,373
Costa Rica	7,415
Croatia	55,745
Dominica	97
Dominican Republic	4,649
Eswatini	6,867
France	524,055
French Polynesia	379
Georgia	59,732
Germany	231,244
Guam	8
Hong Kong	392,853
Hungary	33,134
Indonesia	422,045
Israel	58,000
Italy	225,000
Jamaica	1,834
Japan (Note: Data for 2024)	243,687
Jordan	57,720
Kazakhstan	157,845
Kyrgyzstan	19,600
Laos	4,343
Latvia	5,476
Lebanon	15,610
Macao	148,121
Madagascar	2,234
Malaysia	1,365,387
Maldives	83,019
Mali (Note: Data for 2014)	1,500
Mauritius	86,294
Mexico	59,020
Mongolia	1,888
Montenegro	1,131
Myanmar	34,628
Nepal (Note: Data for arrivals by air only.)	75,124
Netherlands	155,000
New Zealand (Note: Data for 2026)	83,239
Oman	321,161
Panama	6,748
Papua New Guinea	4,293
Peru	7,201
Philippines	107,278
Qatar	333,708
Romania	16,753
Russia	130,400
Seychelles	13,518
Singapore	1,272,069
Slovakia	6,805
South Africa	85,639
South Korea	123,416
Spain	141,122
Sri Lanka	356,729
Suriname	1,045
Taiwan	40,846
Tanzania	69,876
Thailand	1,595,754
Timor-Leste	799
Turkey	86,996
Ukraine	23,173
United Arab Emirates	2,073,000
United Kingdom	525,000
United States (Note: Total number includes tourists, business travelers, students, exchange visitors, temporary workers and families, diplomats and other representatives and all other classes of nonimmigrant admissions (I-94).)	2,944,840
Uzbekistan (Note: Data for 2015)	18,100
Zambia	25,517
Zimbabwe	5,421

== Gallery of historic images ==
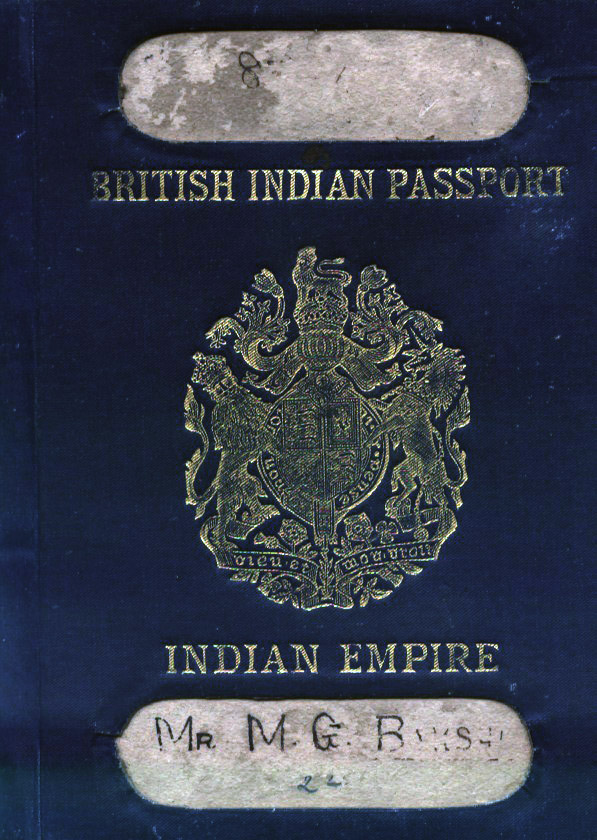
British Indian passport issued during the colonial days

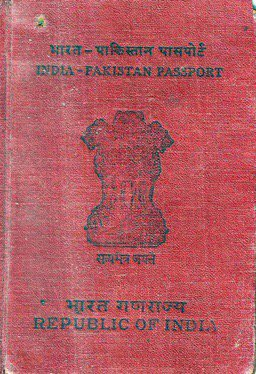
Indian passport, valid only for India-Pakistan travel, issued to migrants to enable them to visit family, friends and ancestral homes located on the other side of the Radcliffe line

Passport issued by the Dominion of India (1947–1950)

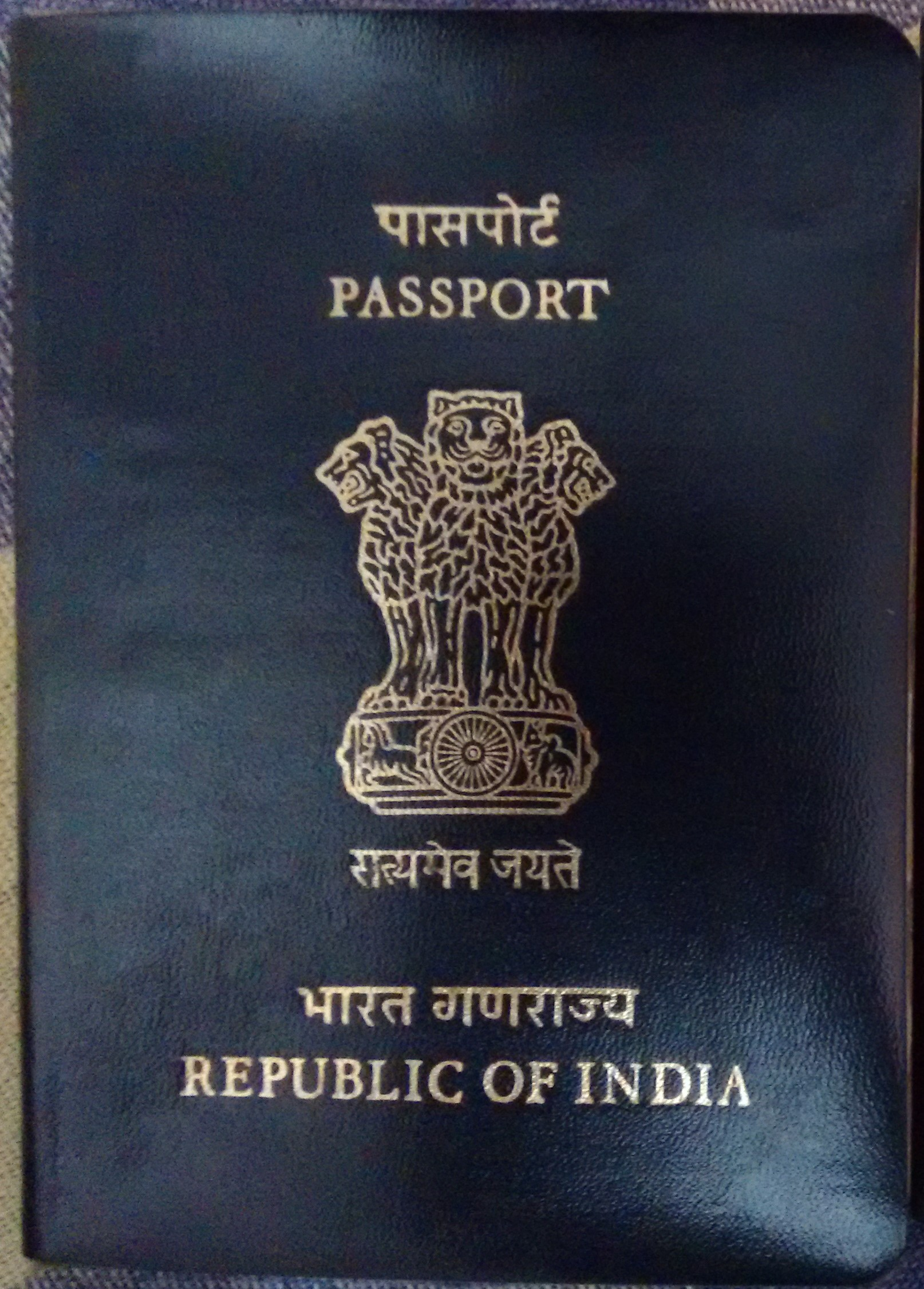
Cover of a passport (1986)

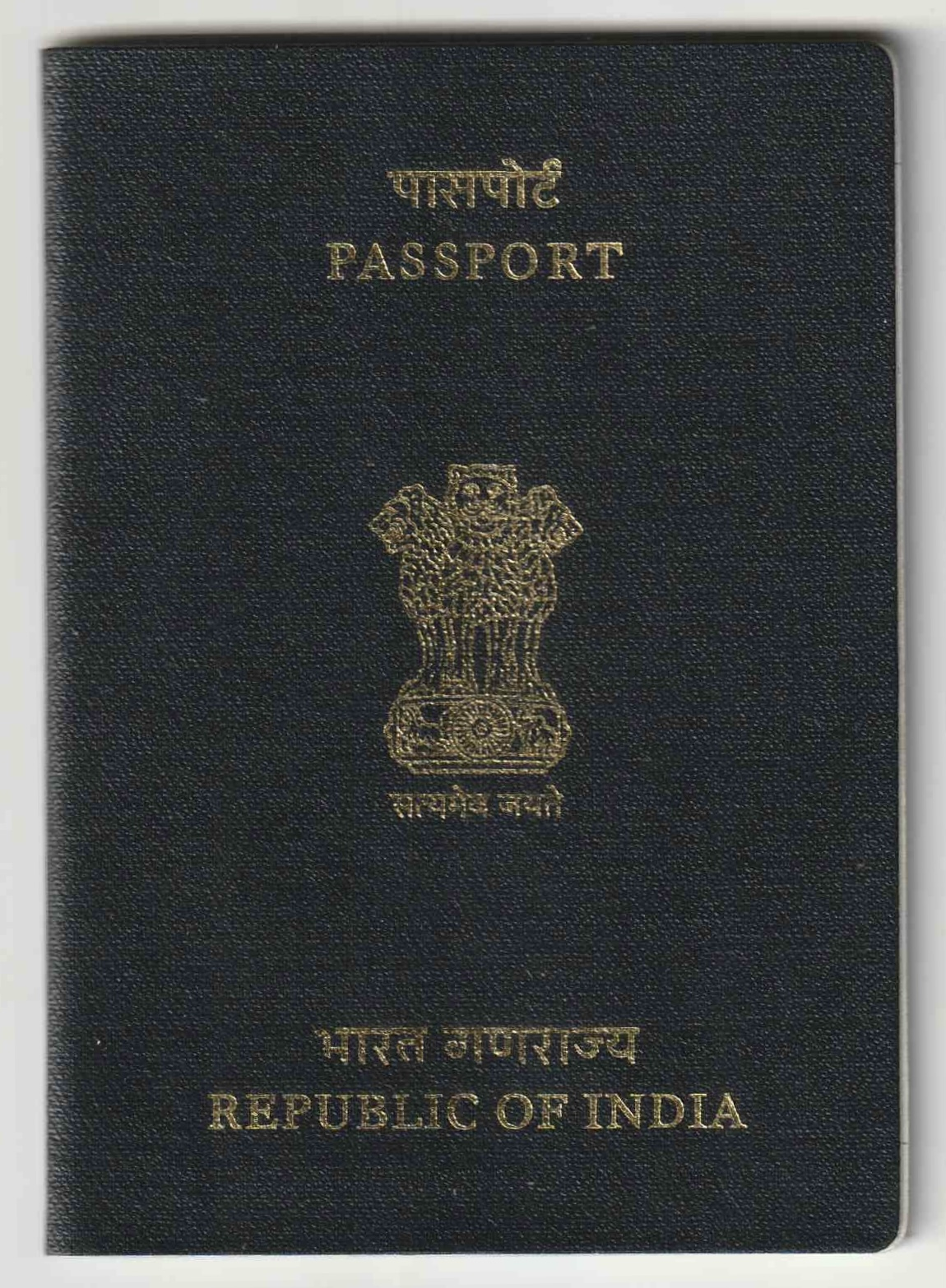
Passport Cover (used till March 2021)

Indian Ordinary Passport (2021)

Indian Official Passport (2021)

Indian Diplomatic Passport (2021)

Indian Ordinary Passport (2024) with Biometric Passport logo

== See also ==
- Visa requirements for Indian citizens
- Visa policy of India
- Indian nationality law
- Overseas Citizenship of India
- The Passports Act
