= Passports Act, 1967 =

Indian legislation

Parliament of India
- Long title: An Act to provide for the issue of passports and travel documents, to regulate the departure from India of citizens of India and other persons and for matters incidental or ancillary thereto.
- Citation: Act 15 of 1967
- Enacted by: Parliament of India
- Enacted: 24 June 1967
- Commenced: 5 May 1967

Amends
- Indian Passport Act, 1920 (34 of 1920)

Repeals
- Passports Ordinance, 1967 (4 of 1967)

Amended by
- Passports (Amendment) Act 1978 (Act 31 of 1978); Passports (Amendment) Act, 1993 (35 of 1993); Passports (Amendment) Act, 2002 (17 of 2002)

Related legislation
- Citizenship Act, 1955
- Status: In force

The Passports Act, 1967 is an act of the Parliament of India "for the issue of passports and travel documents, to regulate the departure from India of citizens of India and for other persons and for matters incidental or ancillary thereto." The Act applies to whole of India extending to citizens of India living outside the country. The Act replaced the Indian Passport Ordinance 1967 and was enacted by Act 15 of 1967 with retrospective effect from 5 May 1967. The act describes the procedures in getting an Indian passport, which replaced the British Indian passport and The Passport Act of 1920.

In conformity with Article 9 of the Indian Constitution, the Act does not allow dual citizenship. Under Section 12 of the Act, a person must surrender his passport if he has acquired the citizenship of a foreign country.

== Background ==
In Satwant Singh Sawnhey v. D. Ramarathnam, Asst. Passport Officer, the Supreme Court has held that a right to travel is a Fundamental right under Article 21 of Indian Constitution and the government has no right to refuse a passport to a person who has applied for the same. It thus became necessary to regulate the issuance of passport and travel documents by law. Prior to the act, the government had issued passports in exercise of its executive power on foreign relations.

As, the Parliament was not in session at that time, the President of India promulgated an ordinance namely "The Indian Passport Ordinance, 1967 (4 of 1967)". The aforesaid act was passed to replace the ordinance.

== Classes of passports and travel documents ==
Indian passport cover

Official Passport

Diplomatic Passport

The following classes of passports are issued under this act

- ordinary passport;
- official passport;
- diplomatic passport.

The following classes of travel documents may be issued under this act

- emergency certificate authorising a person to enter India;
- certificate of identity for the purpose of establishing the identity of person;
- such other certificate or document as may be prescribed.

== Impounding of passport ==
The passport authority may impound or cause to be impounded or revoke a passport or travel document:--

- if the passport authority is satisfied that the holder of the passport or travel document is in wrongful possession thereof;
- if the passport or travel document was obtained by the suppression of material information or on the basis of wrong information provided by the holder of the passport or travel document or any other person on his behalf;
- if the passport authority deems it necessary so to do in the interests of the sovereignty and integrity of India, the security of India, friendly relations of India with any foreign country, or in the interests of the general public;
- if the holder of the passport or travel document has, at any time after the issue of the passport or travel document, been convicted by a court in India for any offence involving moral turpitude and sentenced in respect thereof to imprisonment for not less than two years;
- if proceedings in respect of an offence alleged to have been committed by the holder of the passport or travel document are pending before a criminal court in India;
- if any of the conditions of the passport or travel documents is contravened;
- if it is brought to the notice of the passport authority that a warrant or summons for the appearance, or a warrant for the arrest, of the holder of the passport or travel document has been issued by a court under any law for the time being in force or if an order prohibiting the departure from India of the holder of the passport or other travel document has been made by any such court and the passport authority is satisfied that a warrant or summons has been so issued or an order has been so made;
- A court convicting the holder of a passport or travel document of any offence under this Act or the rules made thereunder may also revoke the passport or travel document.

== Restriction on granting passport ==
The passport authority or central shall refuse to issue passport on any one or more of the following grounds, and no other ground

- that the applicant may, or is likely to, engage in such country in activities prejudicial to the sovereignty and integrity of India:
- that the presence of the applicant in such country may, or is likely to, be detrimental to the security of India;
- that the presence of the applicant in such country may, or is likely to, prejudice the friendly relations of India with that or any other country;
- that in the opinion of the Central Government the presence of the applicant in such country is not in the public interest;
- that the applicant is not a citizen of India;
- that the applicant has, at any time during the period of five years immediately preceding the date of his application, been convicted by a court in India for any offence involving moral turpitude and sentenced in respect thereof to imprisonment for not less than two years;
- that proceedings in respect of an offence alleged to have been committed by the applicant are pending before a criminal court in India;
- that a warrant or summons for the appearance, or a warrant for the arrest, of the applicant has been issued by a court under any law for the time being in force or that an order prohibiting the departure from India of the applicant has been made by any such court;
- that the applicant has been repatriated and has not reimbursed the expenditure incurred in connection with such repatriation.

== See also ==
- Indian nationality law
- Indian Passport
