= Islam in Uttar Pradesh =

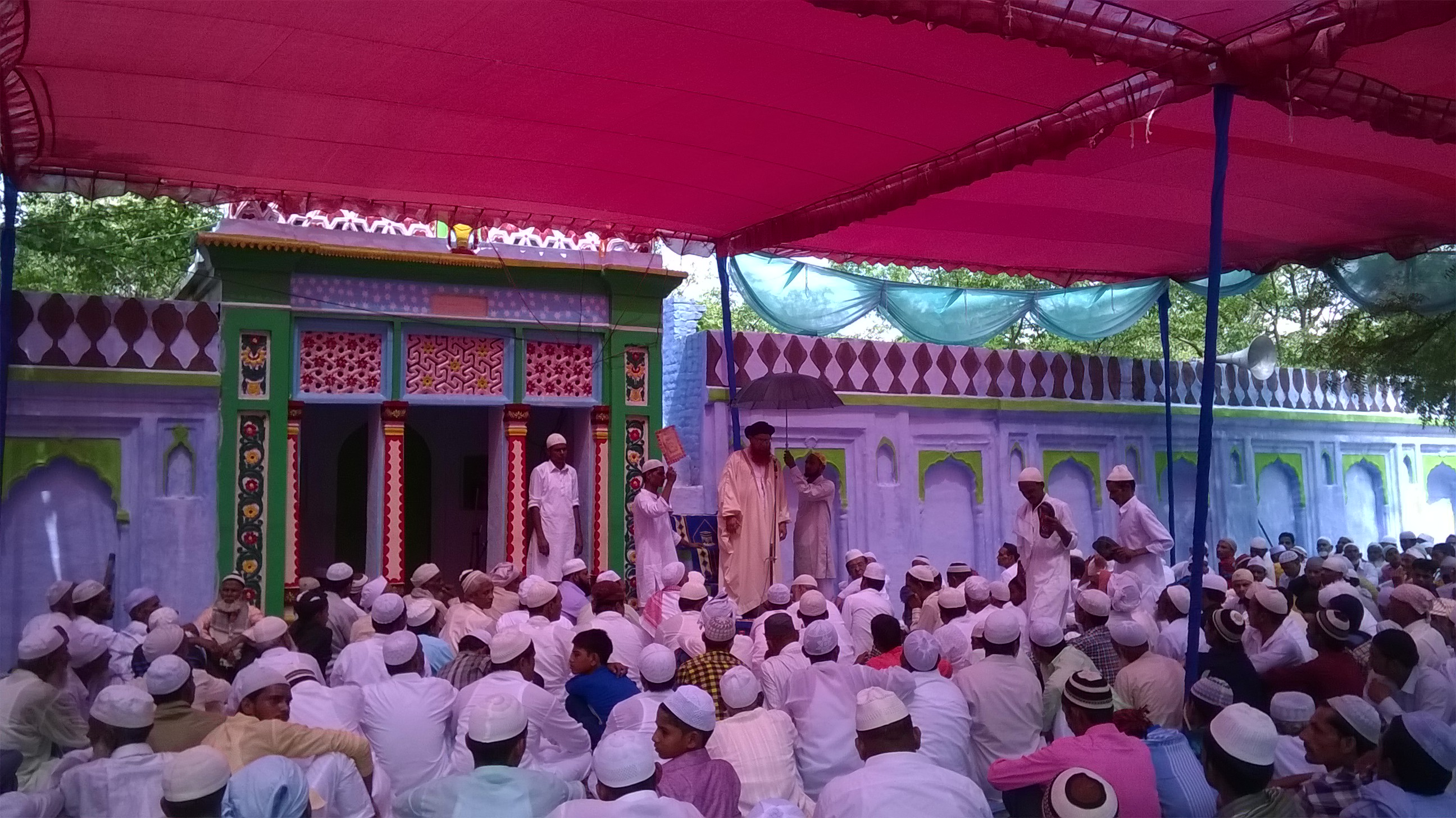
- Eid al-Fitr in Uttar Pradesh

Total population
- 38,483,967 (2011)▲19.26% of the Uttar Pradesh population

Regions with significant populations
- Moradabad: 50.8%
- Rampur: 50.6%
- Bijnor: 43.0%
- Saharanpur: 42.0%
- Muzaffarnagar: 41.3%
- Amroha: 40.8%
- Balrampur: 37.5%
- Bareilly: 34.5%
- Bahraich: 33.53%
- Shravasti: 30.79%

Religions
- Islam; Majority Sunni Islam • Minority Shia islam

Languages
- Hindustani (Urdu-Hindi) • Bhojpuri • Awadhi • Braj Bhasha

Islam is the second largest religion in the state of Uttar Pradesh with 38,483,967 adherents in 2011, forming 19.26% of the total population. They do not form a unified ethnic community, but are differentiated by sectarian, denominational, caste and Baradari divisions, as well as by language and geography. Nevertheless, the community shares some unifying cultural factors. Uttar Pradesh has more Muslims than any Muslim-majority country in the world except Indonesia, Pakistan, Bangladesh, Nigeria, Egypt, Iran, Turkey, Iraq and Afghanistan. Uttar Pradesh also has the fastest-growing Muslim population in India.

== History ==
=== Early history ===
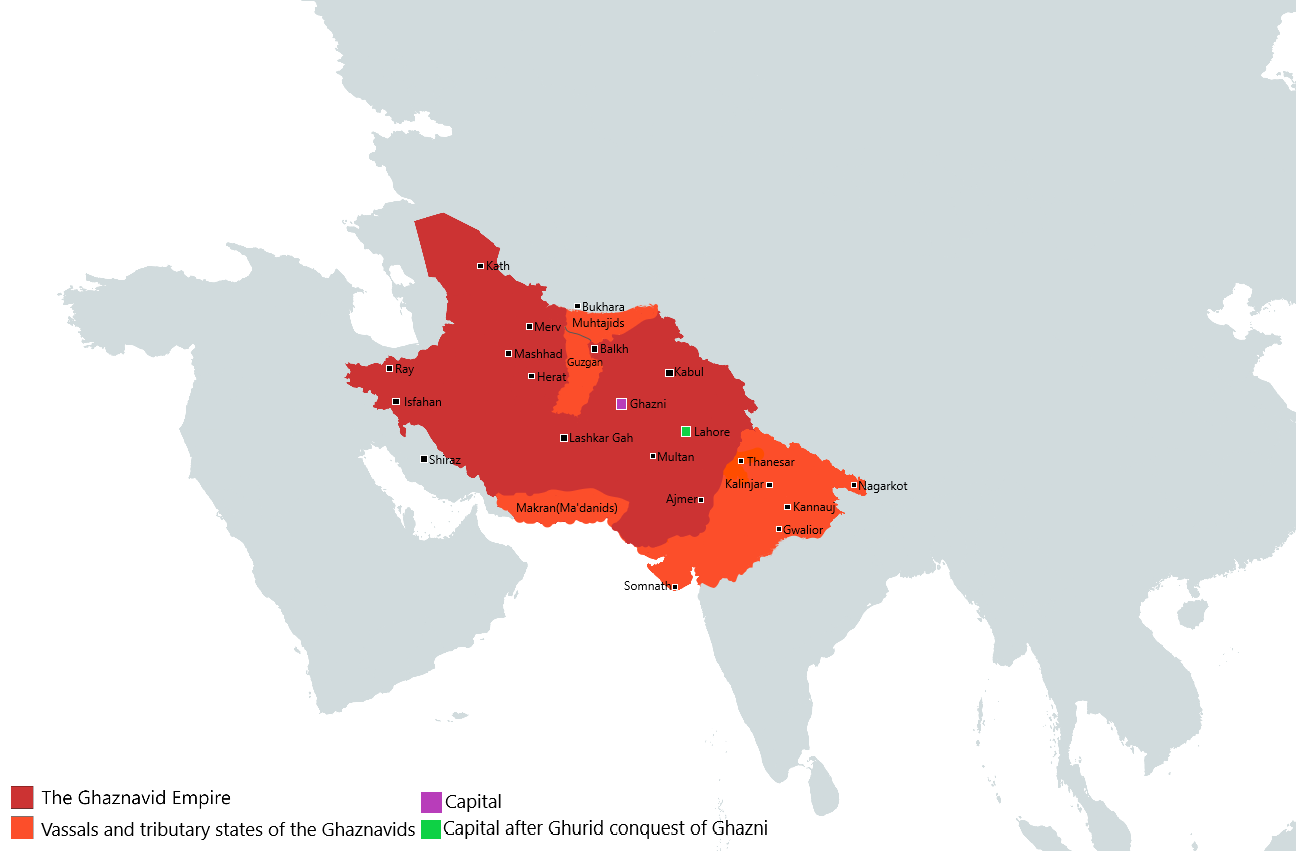
Zenith of the Ghaznavid Empire (1030 CE), with vassal states that included much of present-day Uttar Pradesh.

The earliest traces of Islam in Uttar Pradesh can be traced back to the early 11th century (1000 CE - 1030 CE), when the religion was introduced to the region through various Ghurid and Ghaznavid attacks and incursions.

However, the first consolidated Muslim rule over much of Uttar Pradesh began after 1205 CE, when the region formed part of the various sultanates and was ruled from their capital, Delhi; as a result there arose a community in what is now Uttar Pradesh, referred to as Hindustani Musalmans. The term Hindustani Musalman or Hindi Musalman was applied to Hindus, Buddhists and Jains who either converted to Islam or who had settled for a long time in India. They did not form a unified community as they were divided by ethnic, linguistic, and economic differences. When the Mongols rose to power under Genghis Khan, there was an influx of Muslim refugees into North India, a number of whom settled in the provincial qasbas and brought administrators from Iran; painters from China; theologians from Samarqand, Nishapur and Bukhara. In Azamgarh, Mubarakpur, Mau, and Varanasi, a number of cultural norms arose over time which typified multiple Uttar Pradesh Muslim traditions. The Turkic sultans of Delhi and their Mughal successors patronised the émigré Muslim culture: Islamic jurists of the Sunni Hanafi school, Persian literati who were Shi‘a Ithnā‘ashariyyah, and Sufis of several orders, including the Chishti, Qadiri, Suhrawardi and Naqshbandi.

A number of Sufi missionaries from West Asia (Middle East) and Central Asia migrated and settled in South Asia. A number of natives converted to Islam due to the missionary Sufi saints whose dargahs populate South Asia. The Muslims from various Northern provinces such as Hyderabad Deccan, Balochistan, Sindh, Punjab, Gujarat, Kashmir and other parts of South Asia also moved to capitals of the Muslim empire in Delhi and Agra. Millions of natives converted to Islam during the Muslim rule. The Lodi dynasty was dominated by the Pashtun soldiers from Khyber Pakhtunkhwa and Afghanistan who settled in northern India. After the First Battle of Panipat, Mughal emperor Babur defeated the Lodi dynasty with Chagatai Tajik (or Gurkani), Uzbek, Turkmen and Uyghur soldiers and nobility. These soldiers and nobles were awarded estates and they settled with their families in northern India. These diverse ethnic, cultural, and linguistic groups merged with the Muslims of Uttar Pradesh over the centuries to form the Urdu-speaking Muslim community of South Asia.

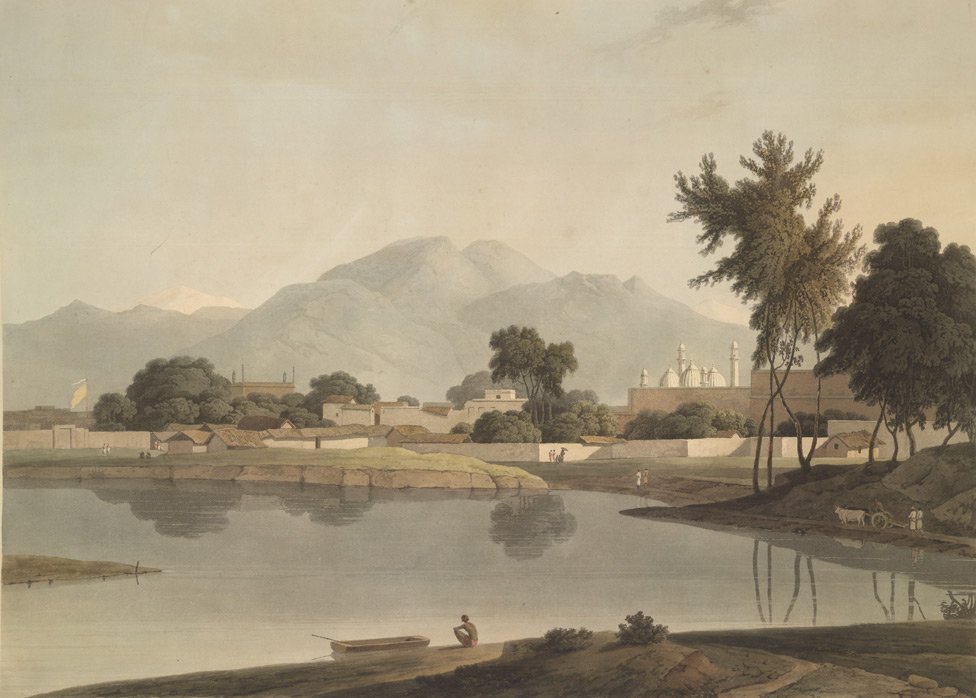
Najibabad, Rohilkhand c. 1784-94. Rohilkhand derives its name from the Rohillas, a group of Pashtun Muslims who settled in northwestern Uttar Pradesh during the 17th and 18th centuries.

The Rohilla leader Daud Khan was awarded the Katehar (later called Rohilkhand) region in the then-northern India by Mughal emperor Aurangzeb Alamgir (ruled 1658–1707) to suppress the Rajput uprisings. Originally, some 20,000 soldiers from various Pashtun tribes (Yusafzai, Ghauri, Usmani, Ghilzai, Barech, Marwat, Durrani, Tareen, Kakar, Naghar, Afridi and Khattak) were hired by Mughals to provide soldiers to the Mughal armies. Their performance was appreciated by Mughal emperor Aurangzeb Alamgir, and an additional force of 25,000 Pashtuns were recruited from modern Khyber Pakhtunkhwa and Afghanistan and were given respected positions in Mughal Army. Nearly all of Pashtuns settled in the Katehar region and also brought their families from modern Khyber Pakhtunkhwa and Afghanistan. During Nadir Shah's invasion of northern India in 1739, the new wave of Pashtuns settled increasing their population to over a million. Due to the large settlement of Rohilla Afghans, the Katehar region became known as Rohilkhand. Bareilly was made the capital of the Rohilkhand state and it became a major Pashtun city with Gali Nawaban as the main royal street. Other important cities included Moradabad, Rampur, Shahjahanpur, and Budaun.

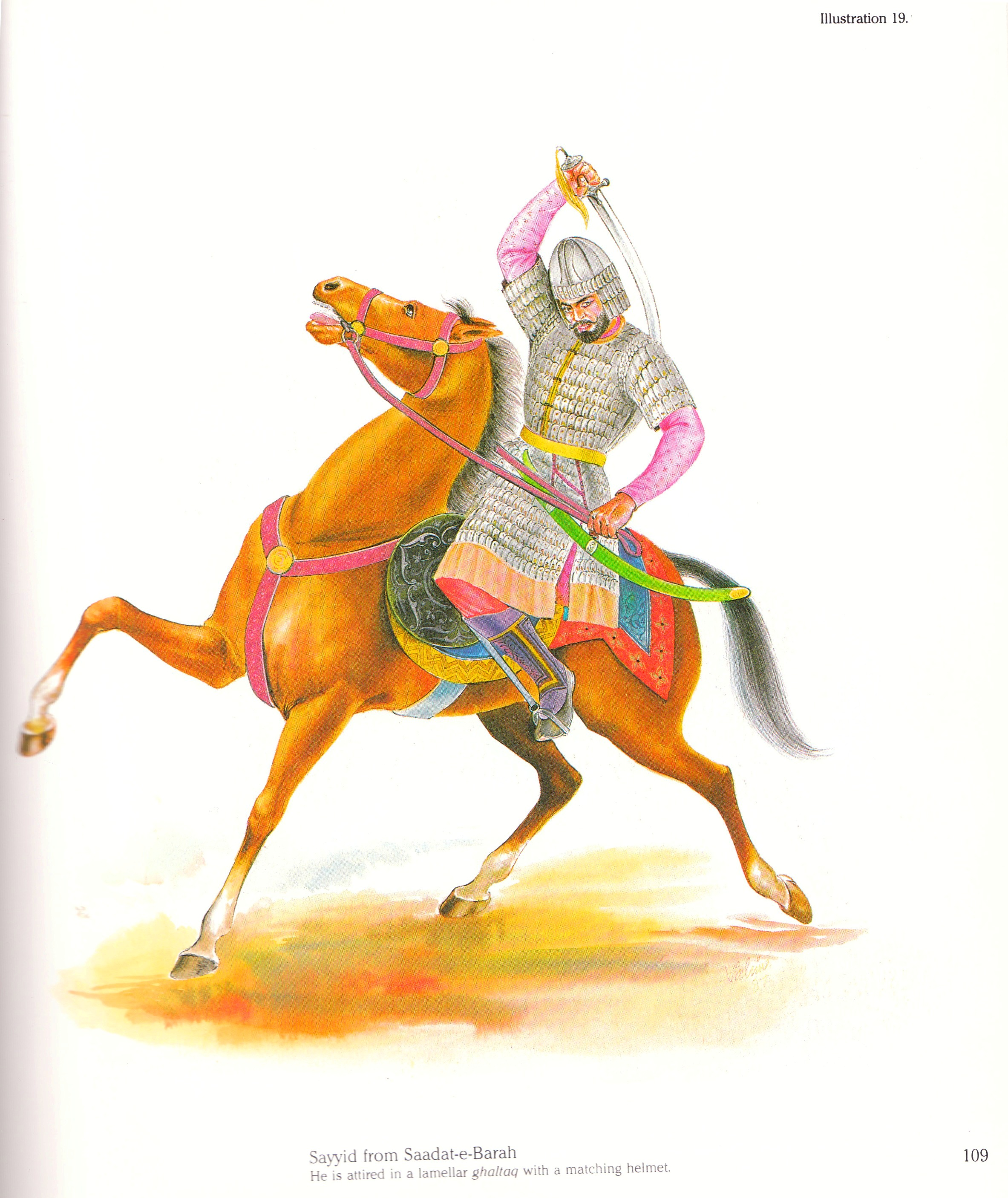
A Sayyid cavalryman belonging to the Saadat-e Barah clan native to the Upper Doab, who were kingmakers of the Mughal empire

The Kayastha and Manihar community were historically involved in land record keeping and accounting. Multiple Hindu Kayasth found favour with Muslim rulers for whom they acted as Qanungos. This close association led to the conversion of a number of members of the Kayastha community to Islam. The Muslim Kayasths primarily speak Urdu (as well as Hindi). The Kayasth sometimes use Siddiqui, Qureshi, Khan, Shaikh, Usmani and Farooqui as their surnames, and consider themselves to belong to the Shaikh community. A number of the converts belonged to the Hindu artisan castes (Vaishyas), who were drawn to the new qasbas. Over time, some of the artisan groups evolved into caste-like groupings, such as the Momin Ansari, who were weavers. A number of these new converts continued to speak their original dialects, such as Awadhi and Khari boli. Over time a fourfold division arose among the Ashraf, with the Sayyids (the actual or claimed descendants of the Islamic prophet Muhammad), the Shaikh, communities signifies Arab descent and comes under high Baradari of society, however majority are the native Brahmin, Kshatriya and Vaishya (in short, high-caste or Dwija) clans who used the title of Shaikh after conversion to Islam, the Mughals, descendants of Central Asian Turks and Mongols and the Pathans, descendants of Pashtun tribesmen from Pakistan and Afghanistan. Occasionally, important convert communities such as the Kayastha Muslim and Manihar of Eastern Uttar Pradesh, were also granted Ashraf status.

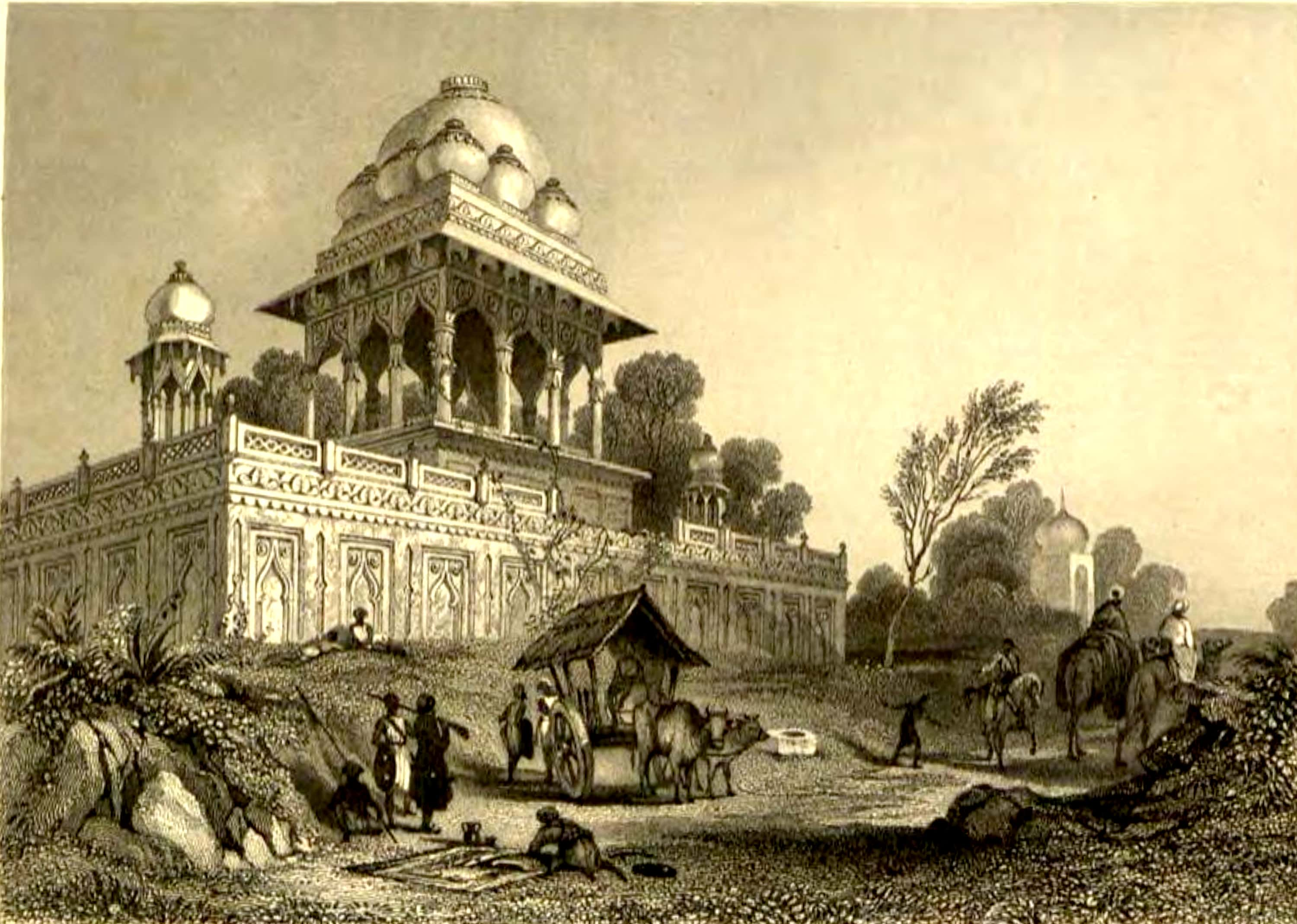
Tomb of Abu Muhammed Khan Kamboh, the Nawab of Meerut. It served as the starting point of the Indian Rebellion in 1857. Painting by T. C. Dibdin, c. 1850.

In Western Uttar Pradesh, there was conversion to Islam of a number of agrarian castes such as the Tyagi, Ranghar, Gurjars and Muley Jat. Some of these convert communities kept a number of their pre-Islamic customs, such as clan exogamy. According to some scholars, this also led to the creeping into Baradari system. With the collapse of the Sultanate of Delhi, the Mughals established control and Uttar Pradesh became the heartland of their vast empire; the region was known as Hindustan, which is used to this day as another synonym (as well as) name for India in several Perso-Arabic-influenced languages. Agra and Fatehpur Sikri were the capital cities of Akbar, the Mughal emperor of India. At their zenith, during the rule of Aurangzeb, the Mughal Empire covered almost all of South Asia (including present day Afghanistan, Pakistan, India and Bangladesh), which was ruled at different times from Delhi, Agra, and Allahabad.

=== Later history ===
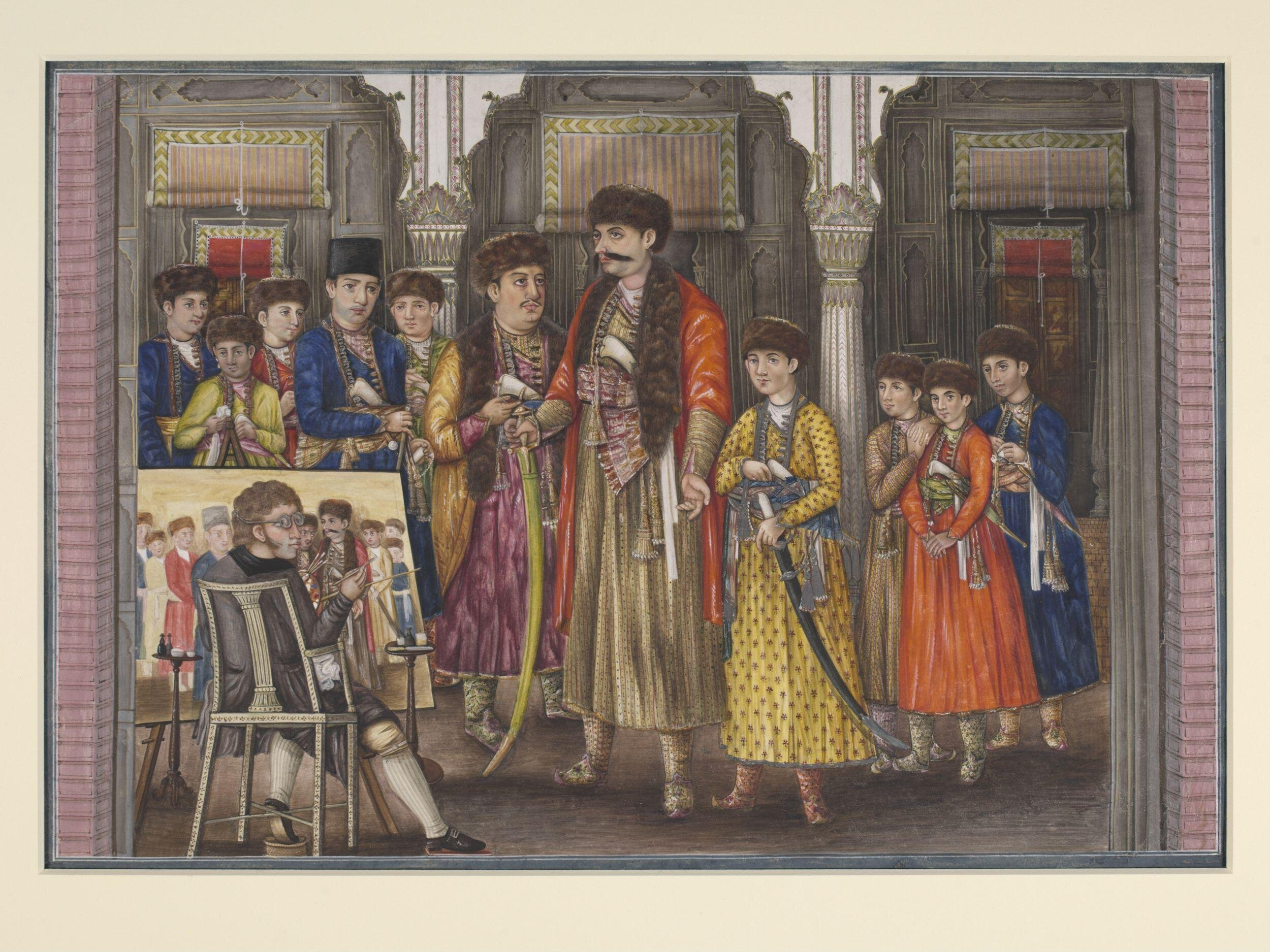
Watercolour on paper depicting Tilly Kettle painting a portrait of Shuja-ud-Daula and his ten sons.

When the Mughal Empire disintegrated, their territory remained confined to the Doab region and Delhi. Other areas of Hindustan (Uttar Pradesh) were ruled by different rulers: Oudh was ruled by the Shi'a Nawabs, Rohilkhand by the Rohillas. The state's capital city of Lucknow was established by the Muslim Nawabs of Oudh in the 18th century. It became an important centre of Muslim culture and the development of Urdu literature.

Of all the Muslim states and dependencies of the Mughal Empire, Awadh had the newest royal family. They were descended from a Persian adventurer called Sa'adat Ali Khan I, who was originally from Khorasan in Persia, one of a number of Khurasanis in the service of the Mughals, mostly soldiers, who hoped for rich rewards if successful. These Khorasanis were Shi'a, and Lucknow became a centre of Shi'a culture in Uttar Pradesh.

By the early 19th century, the British had established their control over what is now Uttar Pradesh. This led to an end of almost six centuries of Muslim rule over Uttar Pradesh.

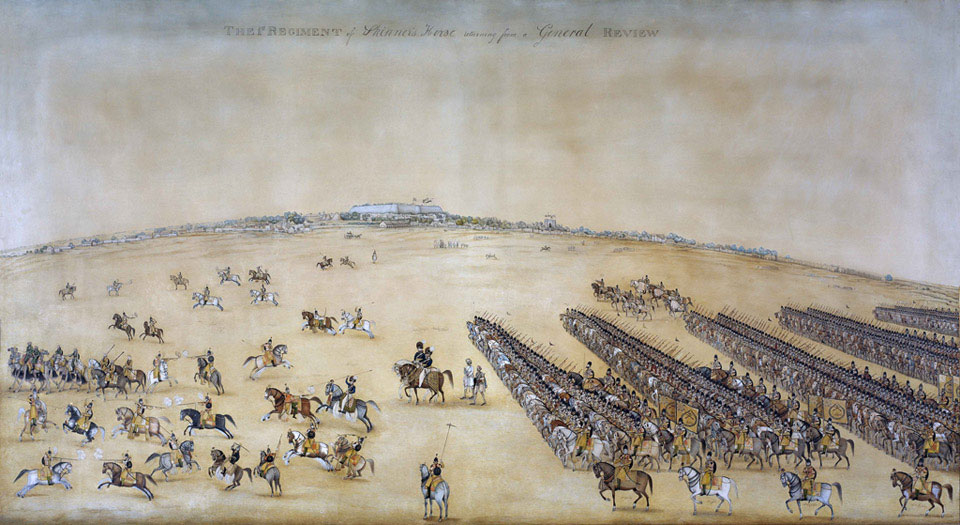
Skinner's Horse, raised in Hansi

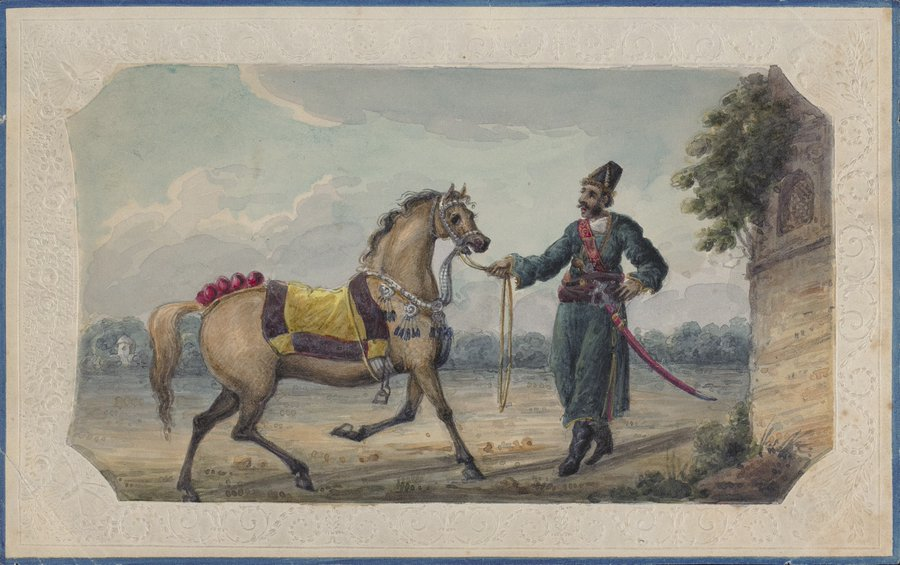
Gardner's Horse, raised in Mainpuri and Farrukhabad

The British began to hire indigenous cavalry in their conquered provinces. The end of Muslim rule saw a large number of unemployed Muslim horsemen, who were employed in the British army. In early British India, the cavalry was almost entirely composed of Muslims, as Hindus were "not so much disposed as the Mahomedans to the duties of a trooper". These cavalry regiments were primarily recruited among Hindustani Musalman biradaris, such as the Ranghar (Muslim Rajputs), Sheikhs, Sayyids, Mughals, and localized Pathans, who made up three-fourths of the cavalry branch of the British army. Irregular cavalry regiments such as Skinner's Horse, Gardner, Hearsay's Horse and Tait's Horse preserved the traditions of cavalry under the former Mughal empire, which had a political purpose because it absorbed pockets of cavalrymen who might otherwise become disaffected plunderers.

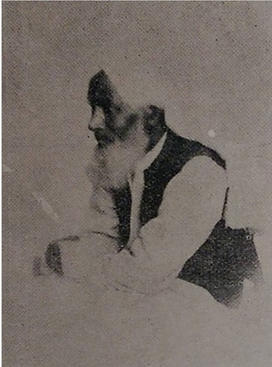
Mahmud Hasan Deobandi

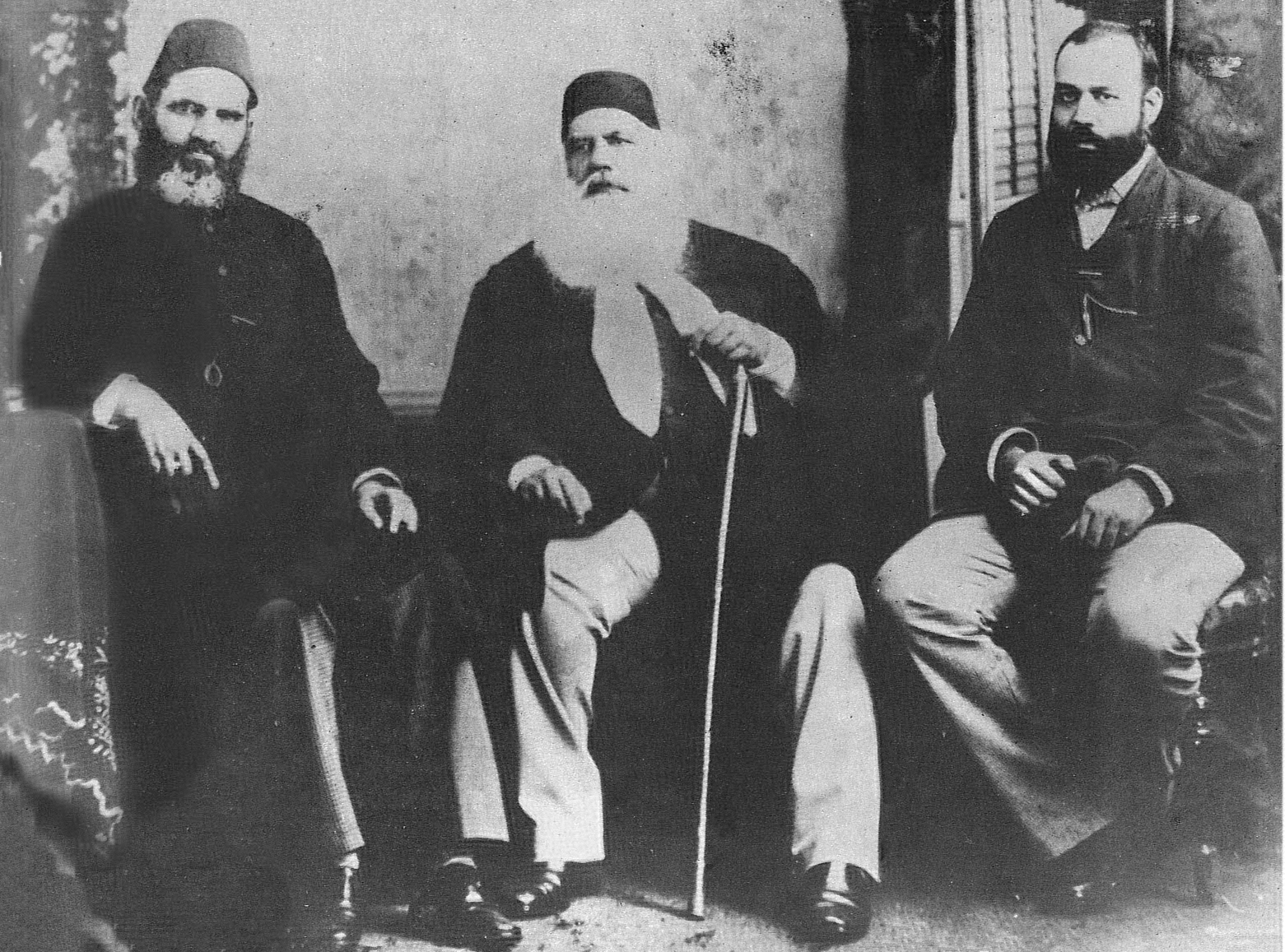
Syed Ahmad Khan and Mohsin-ul-Mulk

The British rulers created a class of feudal landowners who were generally referred to as zamindars, and in Awadh as taluqdars. Some of these landowners provided patronage to the arts and funded a number of the early Muslim educational institutions. A major educational institution was the Aligarh Muslim University, which gave its name to the Aligarh movement. Under the guidance of Sir Syed Ahmed Khan, the Urdu-speaking Muslim elite sought to retain their position of political and administrative importance by reconciling their Mughal and Islamic culture with English education. A somewhat different educational movement was led by the Ulema of Deoband, who founded a religious school (Dar-ul-Uloom) designed to revitalise Islamic learning. The aim of the Deobandis, as the movement became known as was to purge the Muslims of all strata of traditions and customs that were claimed to be Hindu. Most of the early proselytisation was concentrated in the Doab region where Deoband is located, which was home to a number of peasant castes, such as the Ranghar, Gurjar, Tyagi and Jat, who had maintained a number of pre-Islamic customs. A reaction to the growth of the Deobandi movement was the rise of the Barelvi sub-sect, which was much more tolerant of the customs and traditions of the local population. However, the Barelvis under Ahmed Raza Khan Barelvi opposed Hindu–Muslim unity, declaring that the Qur'an forbade friendship with infidels (kafirs), warning that this could result in Muslims losing their identity. He opposed the Deobandi leaders for their political cooperation with Hindu figures, such as Gandhi. According to Ashraf Ali Thanwi the Shari'a norms mandate "distinguishing the Muslim community [qawm], the maintenance of difference in our clothing, our manners, our way of speaking, and our behavior." He forbade the wearing of the English coat and pants, tying a Dhoti [worn by Hindu men], Gurgabi shoes and Lehenga, which were "things that are purely characteristics of other communities [aqwam]".

The role of Urdu played an important role in the development of Muslim self-consciousness in the early twentieth century. Uttar Pradesh Muslims set up Anjumans (associations) for the protection and promotion of Urdu. These early Muslim associations formed the core of the All-India Muslim League in Dhaka in 1905. Some of the leaders belonged to the Ashraf category. Uttar Pradesh Muslims created the movement for a separate Muslim state, later known as Pakistan. The eventual effect of this movement led to the partition of India, and creation of Pakistan. This led to an exodus of multiple Muslim professionals to Pakistan, and the division of the Uttar Pradesh Muslims, with the formation of the Muhajir ethnic group of Pakistan. The role of the Aligarh Muslim University was extremely important in the creation of Pakistan.

=== Modern history ===
The net result of partition and independence in 1947 was the division of the Urdu-speaking Uttar Pradesh Muslims. It led to major social, political, and cultural changes; for example, Urdu lost its status. The abolishment of the zamindari system also had a profound impact on culture as these large landowners provided patronage to local artisans; this was especially true in the Awadh region. Muslim artisan communities persevered with the growth of specialized industries such as lock manufacturing in Aligarh. The Muslim peasantry in western Uttar Pradesh benefited from the Green Revolution, while those in eastern Uttar Pradesh did poorly. The Muslim League eventually declined, with most Muslims initially supporting the Indian National Congress. The post-partition period saw a reduction in communal violence between Hindus and Muslims. This was also a period where Muslims were led by Ashraf leaders such as Abdul Majeed Khwaja in Aligarh and Rafi Ahmed Kidwai in Barabanki. However, from the late 1960s onwards, there was an increase in the number of communal riots, culminating in the destruction of the Babri Masjid in Ayodhya in December 1992. This period has also seen the decline of Muslim support for the Congress Party.

From the 1990s there have been two issues confronting the Muslim community: the Mandir and Mandal. Mandir refers to the construction of the Ram Mandir supported by the Bharatiya Janata Party in the town of Ayodhya in eastern Uttar Pradesh, on the site of Babri Masjid. The project was poorly received and resulted in communal violence. The other issue is commonly referred to as Mandal, a reference to the Mandal Commission, which was set up to consider the question of seat reservations and quotas for people to address caste discrimination. Among the groups identified for reservation were a number of Ajlaf communities, which led to greater assertion of Ajlaf political power and a decline in the Ashraf leadership. A major controversy is a demand for the Muslim community to receive reservation as a whole, which is being opposed by multiple Ajlaf communities. There are also demands to extend the scheduled caste status, which the Indian Constitution restricts to Hindu castes and Muslim Ajlaf groups like the Halalkhor and Lal Begi.

== Culture ==
=== Social system ===
Some South Asian Muslims stratify their society according to qaums. Qaums are further divided into biradaris, which claim descent from an actual or putative common male ancestor. For example, an individual will belong to the Shaikh qaum and Behlim Rangrez or Faridi baradari. This system of stratification, unlike the Hindu caste system, lacks any concept of ritual purity or pollution.

It is commonly believed that Muslims in Uttar Pradesh are divided into the Ashraf, Ajlaf and Arzal categories which are distinguished by ethnic origin and descent. However, students making empirical studies of Muslim communities in different parts of India found that this distinction is not really meaningful in understanding the existing pattern among the diverse social groups in any locality. Technically, the Ashraf are descendants of groups with foreign ancestry (and the upper-caste Hindus who were rich at the time of conversion to Islam), while the Ajlaf are those whose ancestors are said to have converted to Islam. The Ashraf are further divided into four groups: the Sayyid, the alleged descendants of Muhammad; the Shaikh and Siddiqui Manihar claiming descent from early Arab or Persian settlers; the Turks & the Mughal descent from the Mughal dynasty or Gurkani Turks; and the Pathan, who claim descents from Pashtun groups that have settled in India. Technically the first two groups intermarry with each other, while the latter two intermarry. Included sometimes in the Ashraf category are Muslim Rajput groups such as the Rangrez, Manihar and Khanzada Rajputs. A third category, Arzal are supposed to be converts from Hindu Dalit communities, though the term is never used in Uttar Pradesh. Groups that tend to fall in this category include the Halalkhor and Lal Begi. Uttar Pradesh Muslims often identify themselves in smaller units called baradaris, which are localized lineage groupings; for example, the Qidwai Shaikh.

Communities in the Ajlaf category were traditionally associated with the practice of a particular craft. For example, the Momon Ansari were weavers, while the Saifi were blacksmiths. These artisan communities call themselves baradaris and each is characterised by strict endogamy. In the older parts of town and cities in Uttar Pradesh, they are also characterised by residential segregation. Among other traditional artisan baradaris in UP are the Mansoori, Bhatia, Bhishti, Dhobi, Halwai, Teli and Raj, which were at one time associated with a particular craft or trade.

In addition to occupational specialization, biradaris are also concentrated in a particular geographic area. For example, the Doab region is home some cultivation biradaris, such as the Baloch, Dogar, Garha, Gurjar, Turks, Kamboj, Ranghar, and Tyagi. They often live in their own villages and follow distinct customs.

The population is further divided by linguistic division. Muslims in Uttar Pradesh speak Urdu, as well as also local Hindi dialects, such as Bhojpuri, Awadhi, Kauravi, and Braj Bhasha.

=== Dress ===
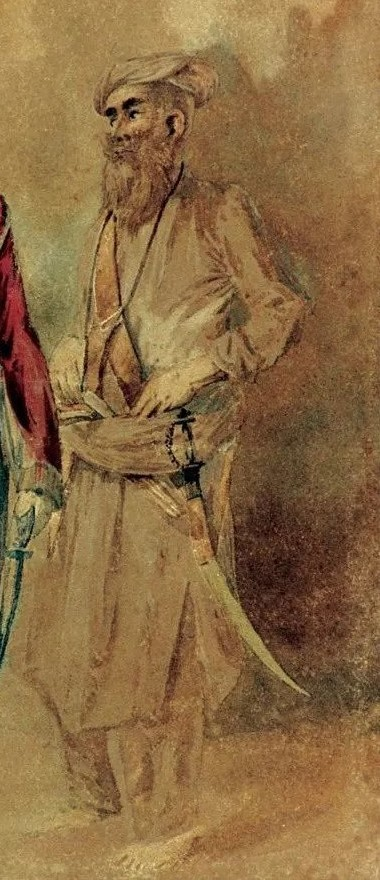
Pensioned Indian Muslim Sipahi of Moradabad, United Provinces, 1839-1842

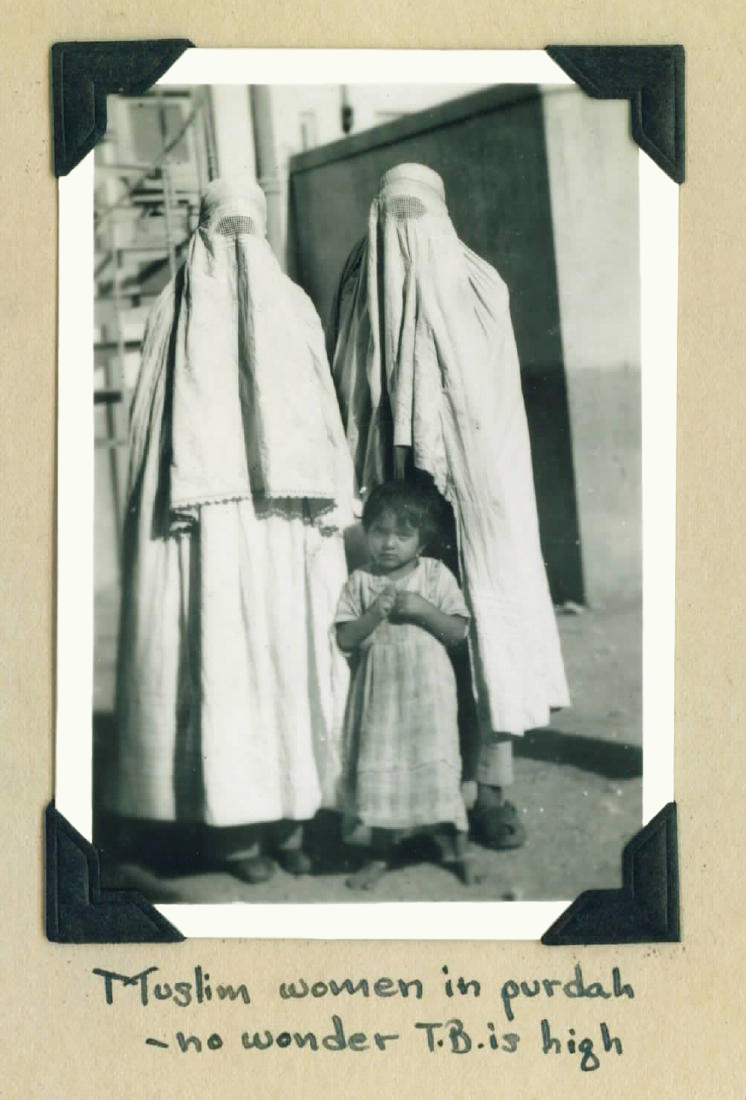
Muslim women in Purdah in India

Both Muslim men and women wore the shalwar kameez, and kurta pajama/churidar, while men wore the sherwani and women wore the gharara for formal wear. Indian Muslim women in urban areas historically also wore a white purdah, which hung around the figure around a small skull-cap.

=== Cuisine ===
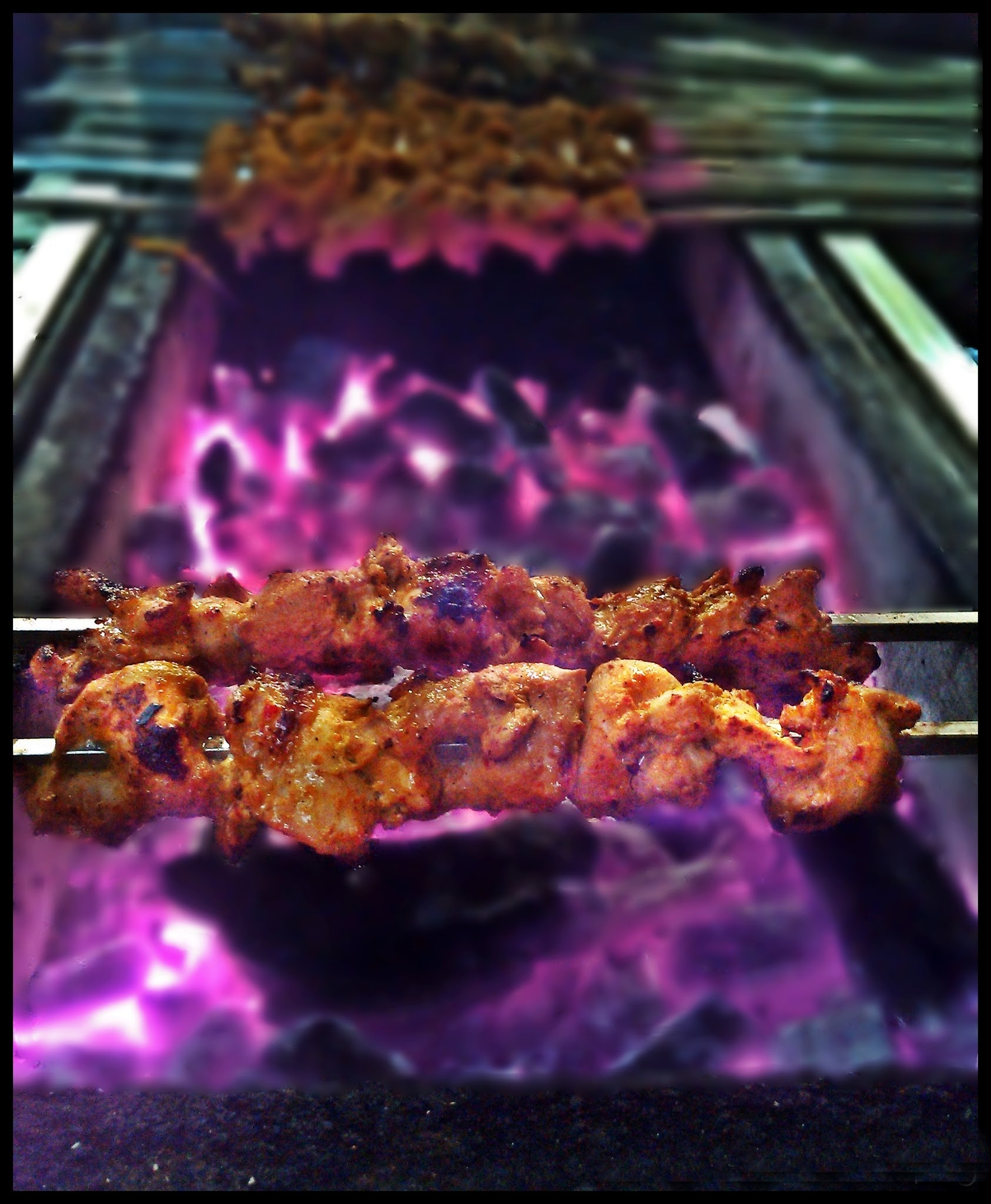
Traditional North Indian Muslim cuisine

The Mughal and Indo-Persian heritage influenced their cuisine, having tastes vary from mild to spicy and is often associated with aroma. It tends to use stronger spices and flavors. Most of a dastarkhawan dining table includes chapatti, rice, dal, vegetable and meat (beef, lamb, chicken, fish) dishes. Special dishes include biryani, qorma, kofta, seekh kabab, Nihari and Haleem, Nargisi Koftay, Shashlik, Kata-Kat, Roghani Naan, Naan, Sheer khurma (sweet), qourma, chai (sweet, milky tea), paan, and other delicacies associated with North Indian Muslim culture.

=== Sufi orders ===
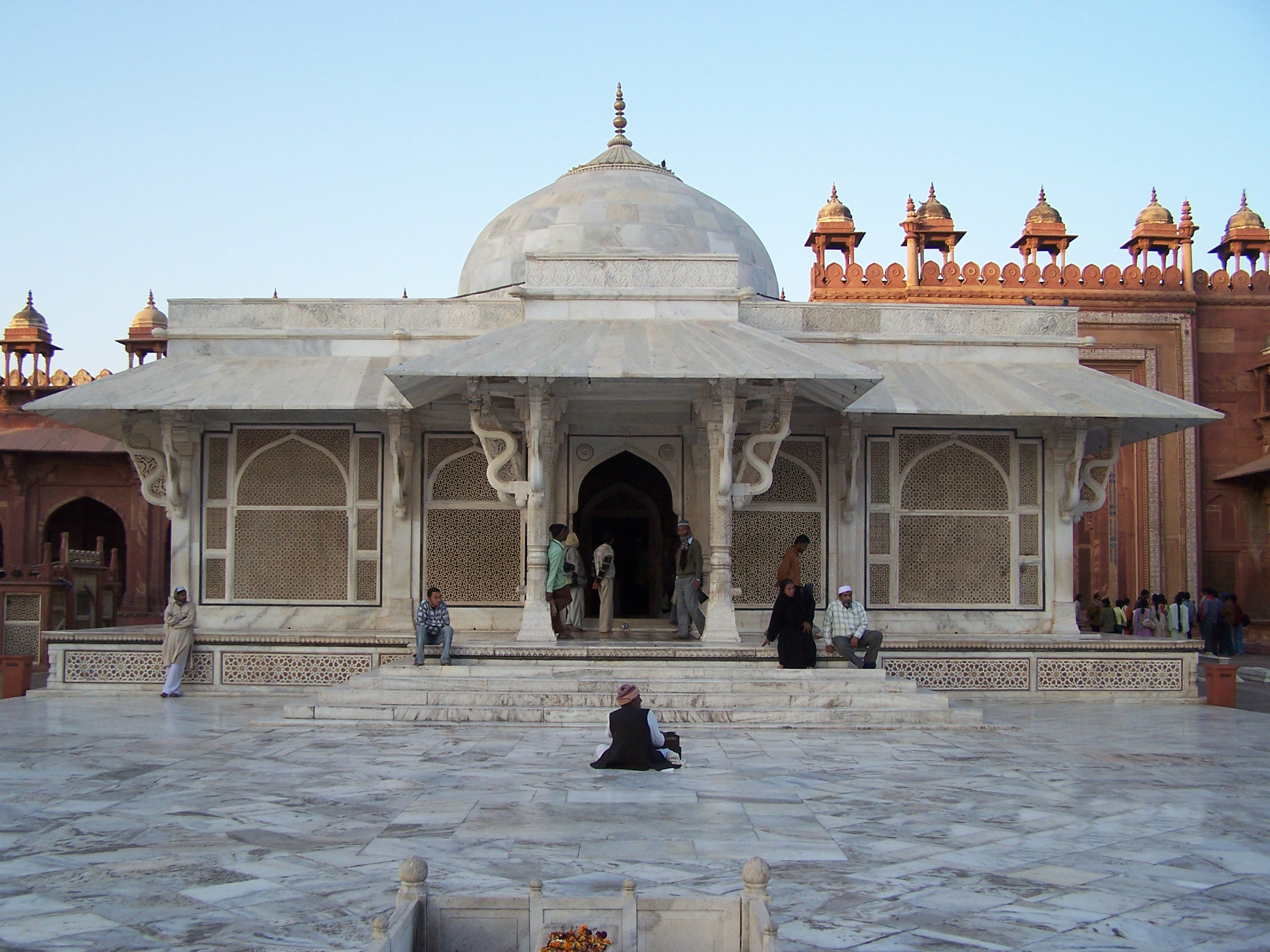
Tomb of Sufi saint Sheikh Salim Chishti in Fatehpur Sikri, Uttar Pradesh

Sufis (Islamic mystics) played an important role in the spread of Islam in India. They were successful in spreading Islam, as multiple aspects of Sufi belief systems and practices had their parallels in Indian philosophical literature, in particular nonviolence and monism. The Sufis' unorthodox approach towards Islam made it easier for Hindus to practice.

Mu'in al-Din Chishti, Qutbuddin Bakhtiar Kaki, Jalaluddin Surkh-Posh Bukhari, Nizamuddin Auliya, Shah Jalal, Nasiruddin Chiragh Dehlavi, Jahaniyan Jahangasht, Syed Sadruddin Raju Qattal, Amir Khusro, Sarkar Sabir Pak, Alaul Haq, Shah Waliullah Dehlawi, Shah Nasiruddin Kaly Mian, Baba Shah Jamal, Syed Ahmad Shah Sirikoti, Mu'in al-Din Chishti, Ashraf Jahangir Semnani, Sarkar Waris Pak, and Ata Hussain Fani Chishti trained Sufis to propagate Islam in different parts of India. When Islamic rule was established in India, the Sufi movement attracted followers from the artisan and untouchable communities; they assisted in bridging the distance between Islam and the indigenous traditions. Ahmad Sirhindi, a prominent member of the Naqshbandi Order, advocated the aggressive and cutthroat conversion of Hindus to Islam. Ahmed Raza Khan Barelvi contributed a lot by defending traditional and orthodox Islam in India through his work Fatawa Razawiyyah.

== Demographics ==
Muslim population in Uttar Pradesh through decennial censuses
Census year	Total Uttar Pradesh population	Muslim population	% Muslim
1971	88,341,144	13,131,062	14.87%
1981	110,862,013	17,660,107	15.93%
1991	132,087,654	23,653,055	17.91%
2001	166,197,921	30,740,158	18.50%
2011	199,812,341	38,483,967	19.26%

=== Scheduled Tribal Muslims ===
A small section of the Muslim population in Uttar Pradesh belonged to officially recognised Scheduled Tribe (ST) communities. According to the 2011 census ST-14 data, 42,261 Muslims were enumerated among Scheduled Tribe communities in the state.

Scheduled Tribe Muslim population by tribe, Uttar Pradesh (2011 census)
Tribe	Muslim population
Tharu	24,911
Buksa	6,278
Gond	4,983
Jaunsari	1,872
Bhotia	1,366
Raji	487
Other Scheduled Tribes	2,364
Total Muslim STs	42,261

=== Education ===
Educational level of Muslims in Uttar Pradesh (Population age 7 and above), Census of India 2011
Education	All religions	Muslims	
	In no.	In no.	(%)
Illiterate	63,114,599	16,758,429	46.73%
Literate	104,775,739	19,101,634	53.27%
Graduate and above	7,055,848	731,148	2.04%
Total population	167,890,338	35,860,063	100%

=== Population by district ===
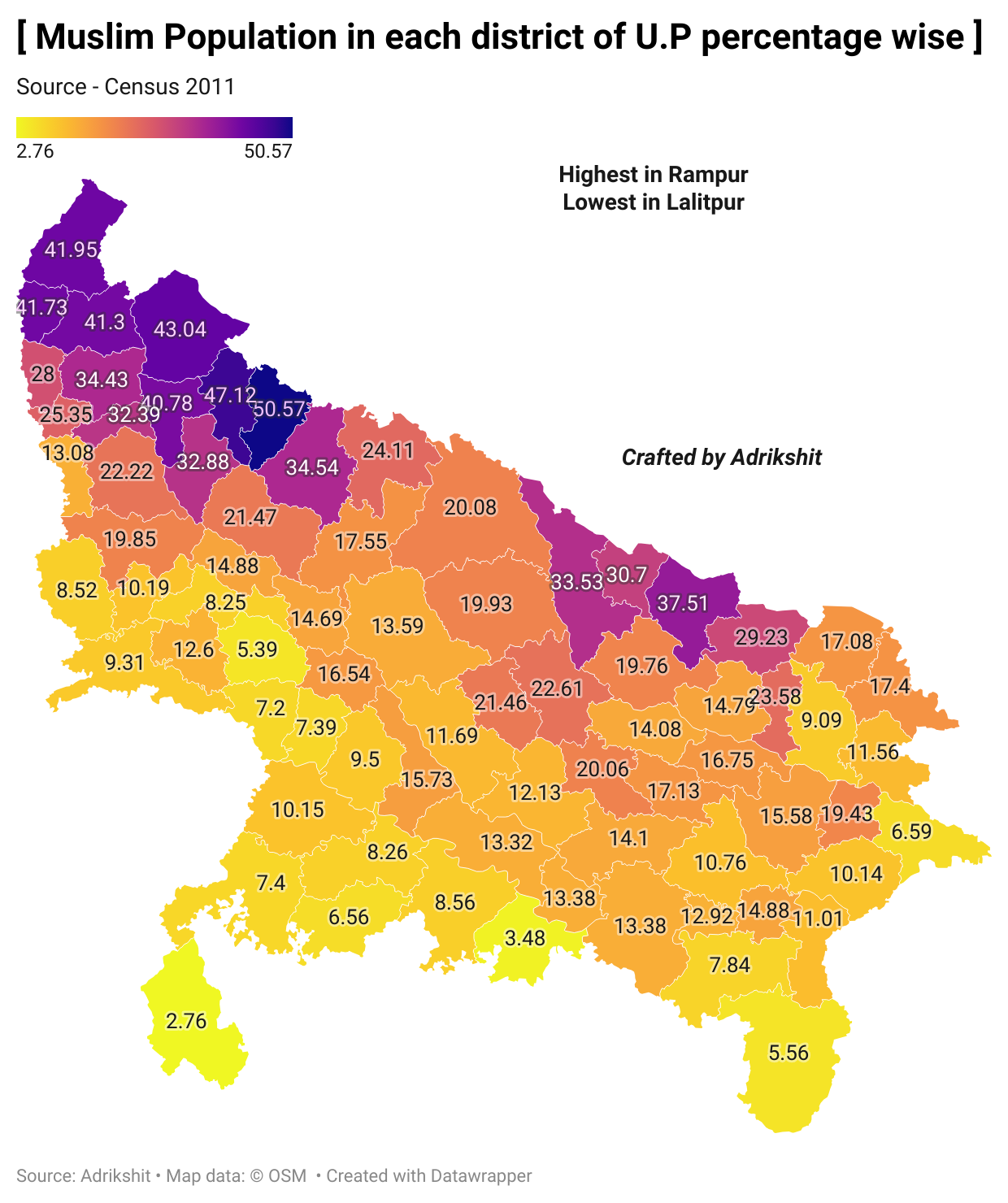
Islam percent in Uttar Pradesh by district, 2011 census

The following table gives the proportion of Muslims in the population of every district in Uttar Pradesh according to the 2011 Census. Excluded are the districts of Hapur, Sambhal and Shamli which did not exist at the time of the census.

Muslim Population in Uttar Pradesh by District
District	Total Population	Muslim Population	%
Agra	4,418,797	411,313	9.31%
Aligarh	3,673,889	729,283	19.85%
Ambedkar Nagar	2,397,888	401,678	16.75%
Auraiya	1,379,545	101,963	7.39%
Azamgarh	4,613,913	718,692	15.58%
Baghpat	1,303,048	364,583	27.98%
Bahraich	3,487,731	1,169,436	33.53%
Ballia	3,239,774	213,440	6.59%
Balrampur	2,148,665	805,975	37.51%
Banda	1,799,410	157,612	8.76%
Barabanki	3,260,699	737,106	22.61%
Bareilly	4,448,359	1,536,534	34.54%
Basti	2,464,464	364,510	14.79%
Bijnor	3,682,713	1,585,210	43.04%
Budaun	3,681,896	790,515	21.47%
Bulandshahr	3,499,171	777,407	22.22%
Chandauli	1,952,756	215,081	11.01%
Chitrakoot	991,730	34,559	3.48%
Deoria	3,100,946	358,539	11.56%
Etah	1,774,480	146,346	8.25%
Etawah	1,581,810	113,961	7.2%
Ayodhya	2,470,996	365,806	14.8%
Farrukhabad	1,885,204	276,846	14.69%
Fatehpur	2,632,733	350,700	13.32%
Firozabad	2,498,156	314,812	12.6%
Gautam Buddh Nagar	1,648,115	215,500	13.08%
Ghaziabad	4,681,645	936,829	20.01%
Ghazipur	3,620,268	368,153	10.17%
Gonda	3,433,919	678,615	19.76%
Gorakhpur	4,440,895	403,847	9.09%
Hamirpur	1,104,285	91,269	8.26%
Hardoi	4,092,845	556,219	13.59%
Jalaun	1,689,974	171,581	10.15%
Jaunpur	4,494,204	483,750	10.76%
Jhansi	1,998,603	147,842	7.4%
Jyotiba Phule Nagar (Amroha)	1,840,221	750,368	40.78%
Kannauj	1,656,616	273,967	16.54%
Kanpur Dehat	1,796,184	176,327	9.82%
Kanpur Nagar	4,581,268	720,660	15.73%
Kanshiram Nagar	1,436,719	213,822	14.88%
Kaushambi	1,599,596	220,423	13.78%
Kheri	4,021,243	807,600	20.08%
Kushinagar	3,564,544	620,244	17.4%
Lalitpur	1,221,592	33,724	2.76%
Lucknow	4,589,838	985,070	21.46%
Hathras	1,564,708	159,448	10.19%
Mahoba	875,958	57,454	6.56%
Mahrajganj	2,684,703	458,650	17.08%
Mainpuri	1,868,529	100,723	5.39%
Mathura	2,547,184	216,933	8.52%
Mau	2,205,968	428,555	19.43%
Meerut	3,443,689	998,969	29.01%
Mirzapur	2,496,970	195,765	7.84%
Moradabad	3,126,507	1,588,297	50.8%
Muzaffarnagar	4,143,512	1,711,453	41.3%
Pilibhit	2,031,007	489,686	24.11%
Pratapgarh	3,209,141	452,394	14.1%
Prayagraj	5,954,391	796,756	13.38%
Rae Bareli	3,405,559	413,243	12.13%
Rampur	2,335,819	1,181,337	50.57%
Saharanpur	3,466,382	1,454,052	41.95%
Sant Kabir Nagar	1,715,183	404,410	23.58%
Sant Ravidas Nagar (Bhadohi)	1,578,213	203,887	12.92%
Shahjahanpur	3,006,538	527,581	17.55%
Shrawasti	1,117,361	343,981	30.79%
Siddharthnagar	2,559,297	748,073	29.23%
Sitapur	4,483,992	893,725	19.93%
Sonbhadra	1,862,559	103,567	5.56%
Sultanpur	3,108,367	650,261	20.92%
Unnao	3,108,367	363,453	11.69%
Varanasi	3,676,841	546,987	14.88%
STATE (Note: Percentages in 'STATE' are calculated out of total population of UP, depicting the share of each religion's population)	199,812,341	38,483,967	19.26%

== Language ==
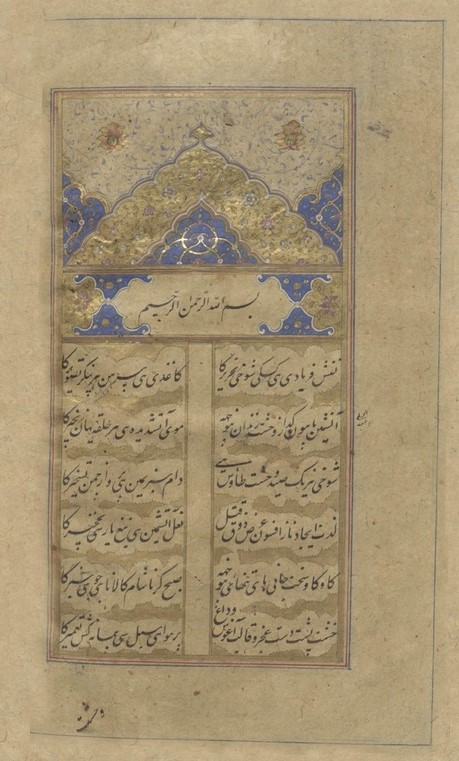
Opening pages of the Urdu divan of Ghalib, 1821

Urdu has much in common with the Hindustani language and is mutually intelligible with Hindi. The grammatical description in this article concerns Standard Urdu. During the Mughal Empire, the development of Urdu was further strengthened and started to emerge as a new language. The official language of the Ghurids, Delhi Sultanate, the Mughal Empire, and their successor states, as well as the cultured language of poetry and literature, was Persian, while the language of religion was Arabic. Gradually, the need to communicate with local inhabitants led to a composition of Sanskrit- and Prakrit-derived languages, written in the Perso-Arabic script with literary conventions and specialized vocabulary being retained from Persian, Arabic, and Turkic; the new standard was eventually called Urdu.

According to the Tashih Gharaib-ul-Lughat by Khan-i Arzu, the "Zaban-e Urdu-e Shahi [the Imperial Urdu] had attained special importance in the time of Alamgir"(1658–1707). During this time period, Urdu was referred to as "Moors" by European writers, such as the English priest John Ovington in 1689 after his visit to India:

The language of the Moors is different from that of the ancient original inhabitants of India, but is oblig'd to these Gentiles for its characters. For though the Moors dialect is peculiar to themselves, yet it is destitute of Letters to express it; and therefore in all their Writings in their Mother Tongue, they borrow their letters from the Heathens, or from the Persians, or other Nations.

Urdu is often contrasted with Hindi, another standardised form of Hindustani. The main differences between the two are that Standard Urdu is conventionally written in the Nastaliq calligraphy style of the Perso-Arabic script and draws vocabulary from Persian, Arabic, Turkic and local languages while Standard Hindi is conventionally written in Dēvanāgarī and draws vocabulary from Sanskrit and Prakrit more heavily. Most linguists consider Urdu and Hindi to be two standardised forms of the same language; others classify them separately (thus a diglossia), while some consider any differences to be sociolinguistic. Mutual intelligibility decreases in literary and specialised contexts. Due to religious nationalism since the partition of British India and consequent continued communal tensions, native speakers of both Hindi and Urdu increasingly assert them to be completely distinct languages.

Urdu's vocabulary remains heavily influenced by Persian and Arabic. Since the 1800s, English started to replace Persian as the official language in India and it also contributed to influence the Urdu language. As of today, Urdu's vocabulary is strongly influenced by the English language.

== Controversies ==
In the 1992 Babri Masjid demolition, a large group of Hindutva activists of the Vishva Hindu Parishad and allied organisations destroyed a Mughal mosque in the city of Ayodhya which is considered to be the sacred birthplace of Rama provoking several months of inter-communal rioting in which Hindus and Muslims attacked one another, burning and looting homes, shops and places of worship.

In 2013, the Muzaffarnagar riots resulted in over 60 deaths and displacement of thousands, mostly Muslims. The violence stemmed from escalating communal clashes and was heavily politicized, further deepening divisions. The Commission said his speech “had the effect of provoking feelings of enmity or hatred” and “aggravating the existing differences or create mutual hatred or cause tension between different castes and communities.”

The state's Prohibition of Unlawful Religious Conversion Ordinance, commonly referred to as the "Love Jihad" law, criminalizes religious conversions through force or coercion and has been criticized for disproportionately targeting Muslims and restricting interfaith marriages.

Extremist elements linked to UP's Muslim community have been involved in terrorism-related cases, attracting law enforcement attention. These cases often become politicized, affecting perceptions of the wider Muslim population.

Reports also document instances where Muslims faced obstacles in practicing their religion, including restrictions on public Eid prayers and Ramadan observances. Additionally, an increase in anti-Muslim hate speech and discrimination has been noted, contributing to a climate of religious intolerance in the state.

In late 2019 and early 2020, widespread protests erupted across Uttar Pradesh against the Citizenship Amendment Act, 2019, which some critics viewed as discriminatory against Muslims. Demonstrations occurred in cities like Lucknow, Kanpur, and Meerut, often turning violent. At least 20 people died, and over 1,200 were arrested. Authorities imposed internet shutdowns and were accused of excessive force and targeting Muslim communities.

In early 2022 the Hijab controversy in Uttar Pradesh emerged, in Aligarh, Dharma Samaj College banned both the hijab and saffron scarves. The principal stated that students covering their faces would not be allowed entry, leading to protests from Muslim students.

The cow slaughter laws have led to communal clashes over Muslims engaging in cattle trade and beef consumption.

Studies including the Sachar Report have claimed that the Muslim community in Uttar Pradesh lags behind in terms of economics, educational attainment and political representation. The general political consensus in India has been, for a number of historic reasons, that the Muslim community as whole should not be subject to any affirmative action policies, such as other socially deprived groupings like the Scheduled Castes. However, the state has conceded that certain baradaris within the larger Muslim community of Uttar Pradesh deserve reservations in jobs and quotas in educational institutions. This principle has been established by the Mandal Commission.

Many of these baradaris that have been traditionally associated with a particular craft have been granted Other Backward Class (OBC) status, which in theory makes them eligible for a number of affirmative action schemes. There has been some criticism as the selection of criteria, which a number of disadvantaged Muslim Baradaris excluded from the lists drawn up by the Government of India. For example, certain Baradaris whose Hindu counterparts were lists as Scheduled Castes were omitted from the first Uttar Pradesh list. This was part dealt with by including Muslim Nats, Muslim Mochis and Muslim Dhobis, whose Hindu counterparts have Scheduled Caste status as backward communities. However, a number of extremely marginalized Muslim communities such as the Muslim Dabgar. Muslim Bandhmatis. Muslim Doma and Muslim Bansphor remain excluded despite the fact that there Hindu counterparts are on the Scheduled Caste list. Other economically deprived groups such as the Kankali, Kanmailia and Kingharia have also been excluded, while groups like the Muslims Kayasths and Muslim Kambojs have been included. Approximately 44 communities have been included in the Uttar Pradesh OBC list.

The Government of India made an announcement to establish a sub-quota of 4.5% for minorities within the existing 27% reservation meant for the OBC. This decision was said to be made to address Muslim communities that have been granted OBC status are unable to compete with wealthier section of the Hindu OBC community. However, Justice Rajinder Sachar who headed the Sachar Committee criticized the government decision saying, "Such promises will not help the backward section of minorities. It is like befooling them. These people are making tall claims just to win elections"

== Notable people ==
Notable Muslims from Uttar Pradesh include:

- Nizamuddin Auliya
- Amir Khusrau
- Ziauddin Barani
- Abd al-Qadir Badayuni
- Malik Muhammad Jayasi
- Salim Chishti
- Abul Fazl
- Faizi
- Shah Waliullah Dehlawi
- Shah Abdul Aziz Dehlavi
- Syed Ahmad Barelvi
- Allama Shibli Nomani
- Hamiduddin Farahi
- Maulana Muhammad Ali Jauhar
- Shaukat Ali
- Hasrat Mohani
- Rafi Ahmed Kidwai
- Begum Hazrat Mahal
- Nawab Wajid Ali Shah
- Mir Taqi Mir
- Mirza Ghalib
- Josh Malihabadi
- Firaq Gorakhpuri
- Kaifi Azmi
- Saeed Naqvi
- Naiyer Masud
- Muzaffar Ali
- Naseeruddin Shah
- Salman Khurshid
- Azam Khan
- Mukhtar Abbas Naqvi
- Mohsina Kidwai
- Syed Sibtey Razi
- Kalbe Jawad
- Talat Mahmood
- Begum Akhtar
- Mohammad Kaif
- Mohammed Shami
- Piyush Chawla
- Arif Mohammad Khan
- Mohammad Yunus Saleem
- Raza Murad
- Shakeel Badayuni
- Majrooh Sultanpuri
- Ismat Chughtai
- Qurratulain Hyder
- Akhtar ul Iman

== See also ==
- Islam in India
- Urdu in Aurangabad
- States of India by Urdu speakers
- Geographical distribution of Urdu speakers
