= Geographical distribution of Urdu speakers =

Urdu-speaking people
اہلِ زبانِ اردو
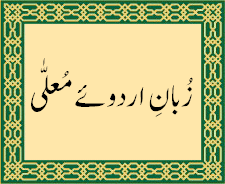
- The phrase Zuban-i-Urdu-i-Mu'alla or "Language of the Exalted Camp"

Total population
- 68.62 million (2019)

Regions with significant populations
- India (diasporic Urdu Belt, a regional belt that consists of Hindi-Urdu belt states, many speakers live in various cities in Deccan Plateau); Pakistan (Urdu-speaking in Karachi, Hyderabad & mainly across large cities in Sindh and other large Pakistani cities); Nepal (Terai region); Bangladesh (diasporic Urdu-speaking Bihari communities, also known as Stranded Pakistanis, live throughout Bangladesh, particularly in Saidpur, Nilphamari, Mohammadpur and Old Dhaka)
- India: 50,772,631 (2011)
- Pakistan: 22,249,307 (2023)
- Nepal: 413,785 (2021)
- United States: 397,502 (2013)
- Bangladesh: 300,000 (2011)
- United Kingdom: 270,000 (2011)
- Canada: 210,815 (2016)
- Australia: 69,131 (2016)

Languages
- Urdu

Religion
- Predominantly Islam Small Minority Hindusim, Sikhism, Christianity and Judaism
- ^a The figure for Pakistan includes only first-language Urdu-speakers, known as "Urdu speaking", and not other ethnic groups of Pakistan who may fluently speak Urdu as a first or second language, numbering up to an additional 94 million.

Native speakers of Urdu are spread across South Asia. (Note: "Urdu" does not broadly refer to the Hindustani language, but merely the literary-register (or style) of the macrolanguage self-identified as a spoken language predominantly by Muslims in South Asia, hence accounting Hindi as a separate entity statistically (especially in India).) The vast majority of them are Muslims of the Hindi–Urdu Belt of northern India, (Note: During the early days of British India, North Indian people of many faiths (even including Hindus and Sikhs) self-identified as Urdu-speakers prior to the mid-19th century, after which they self-identified as Hindi-speakers.) followed by the Deccanis of the Deccan Plateau in south-central India (who speak Deccani Urdu), and majority of the Muhajir people of Pakistan and some stranded communities in Bangladesh. The historical centres of Urdu speakers include Delhi, Hyderabad and Lucknow.

== History ==
From the early Muslim kingdoms developed Indian Muslim clan-groups who were well-rooted social groups that acted as warrior lineages providing court officers and military soldiers. These evolving communities or tribes played a key role in providing a local Muslim leadership. The language developed at the time of Sultans of Dehli due to the mixture of people, likely to be soldiers, from Turkic, Arabic, Persian, Afghan and Indian background.

=== Mughal Empire ===
As early as 1689, Europeans used the label "Moors dialect", which simply meant "Muslim", to describe Urdu, the language associated with the Muslims in North India, such as John Ovington, who visited India during the reign of Mughal emperor Aurangzeb:

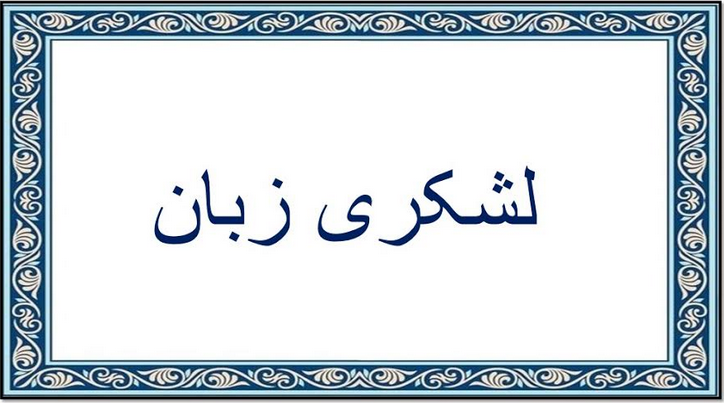
Lashkari Zaban title in Nastaliq

The language of the Moors is different from that of the ancient original inhabitants of India, but is oblig'd to these Gentiles for its characters. For though the Moors dialect is peculiar to themselves, yet it is destitute of Letters to express it; and therefore in all their Writings in their Mother Tongue, they borrow their letters from the Heathens, or from the Persians, or other Nations.

=== Fall of the Mughal Empire ===
The Upper Doab and Rohilkhand was dominated by a literate and homogenous elite, who embraced a distinctive Indo-Persian style of culture. This service gentry, performing both clerical and military service for the Mughal empire and its successor states, provided cultural and literary patronage that continued, even after the political decline, to act as preservers of Indo-Persian traditions and values.

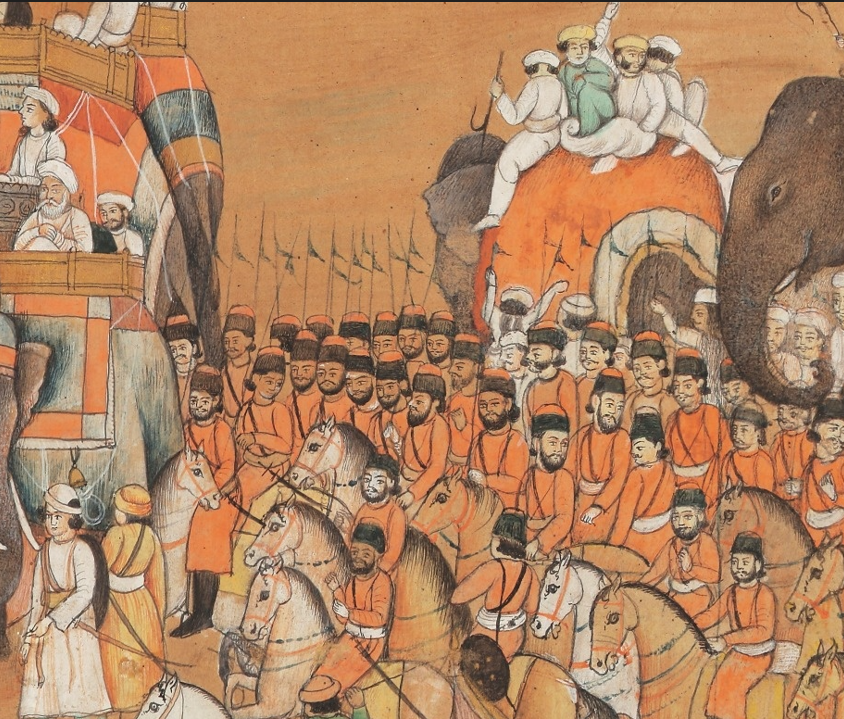
Cavalry in the Durbar Procession of Mughal Emperor Akbar II (r. 1806–1837) under British rule

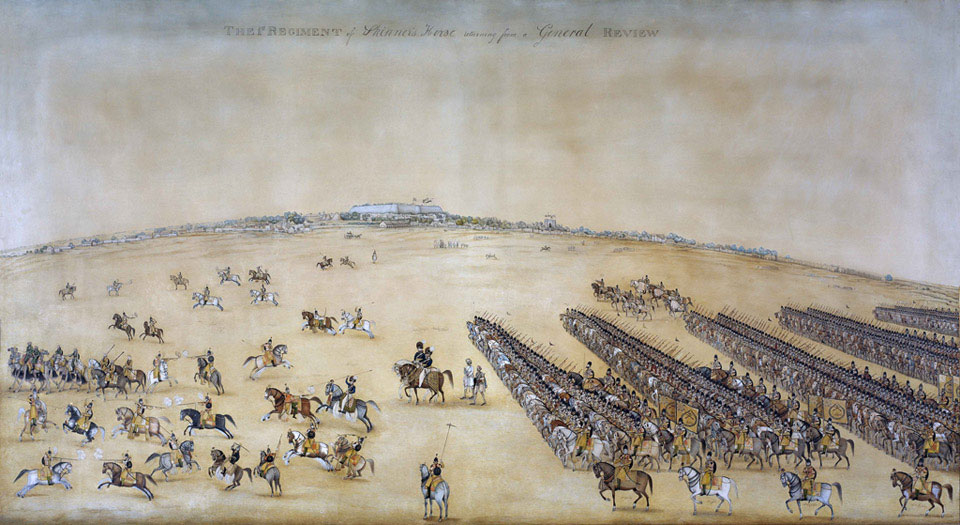
Regiment of Skinner's Horse returning from a General Review, 1828

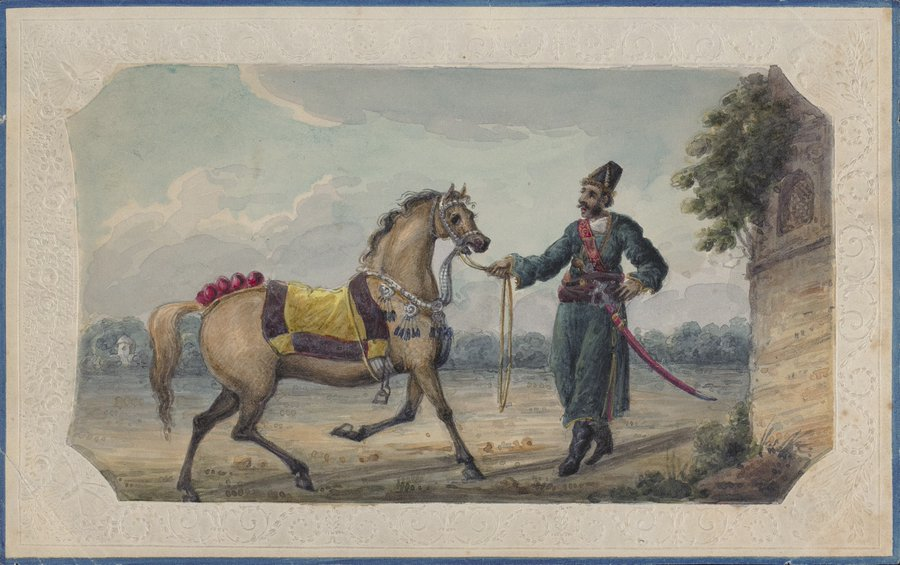
Officer of Col Gardiner’s irregular Cavalry, "drawn mainly from Muslism from Hindoostan"

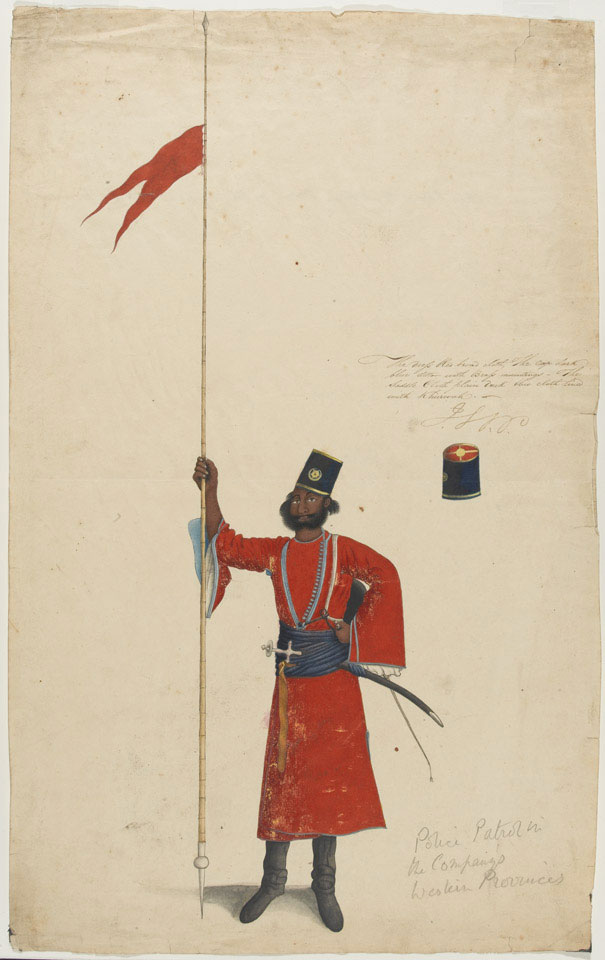
Sowar of the Rohilla Horse, 1815

The end of Muslim rule saw a large number of unemployed Indian Muslim horsemen, who were employed in the army of the East India Company. Thus 75% of the cavalry branch of the British army was composed of a social group referred to as the "Hindustani Mahomedans". This included Indian Muslim Baradaris of the Hindi Belt such as the Ranghar (Muslim Rajputs), Sheikhs, Sayyids, Mughals, and Indianised Pathans. British officers such as Skinner, Gardner and Hearsay had become leaders of irregular cavalry that preserved the traditions of Mughal cavalry, which had a political purpose because it absorbed pockets of cavalrymen who might otherwise become disaffected plunderers. The Governor-general insisted that it was incumbent upon the British to "give military employment" to various north Indian Muslim soldiers, particularly those "formerly engaged in military service of the Native powers". The lingua franca spoken in the army was a form of Urdu referred to in colonial usage as "military Hindustani".

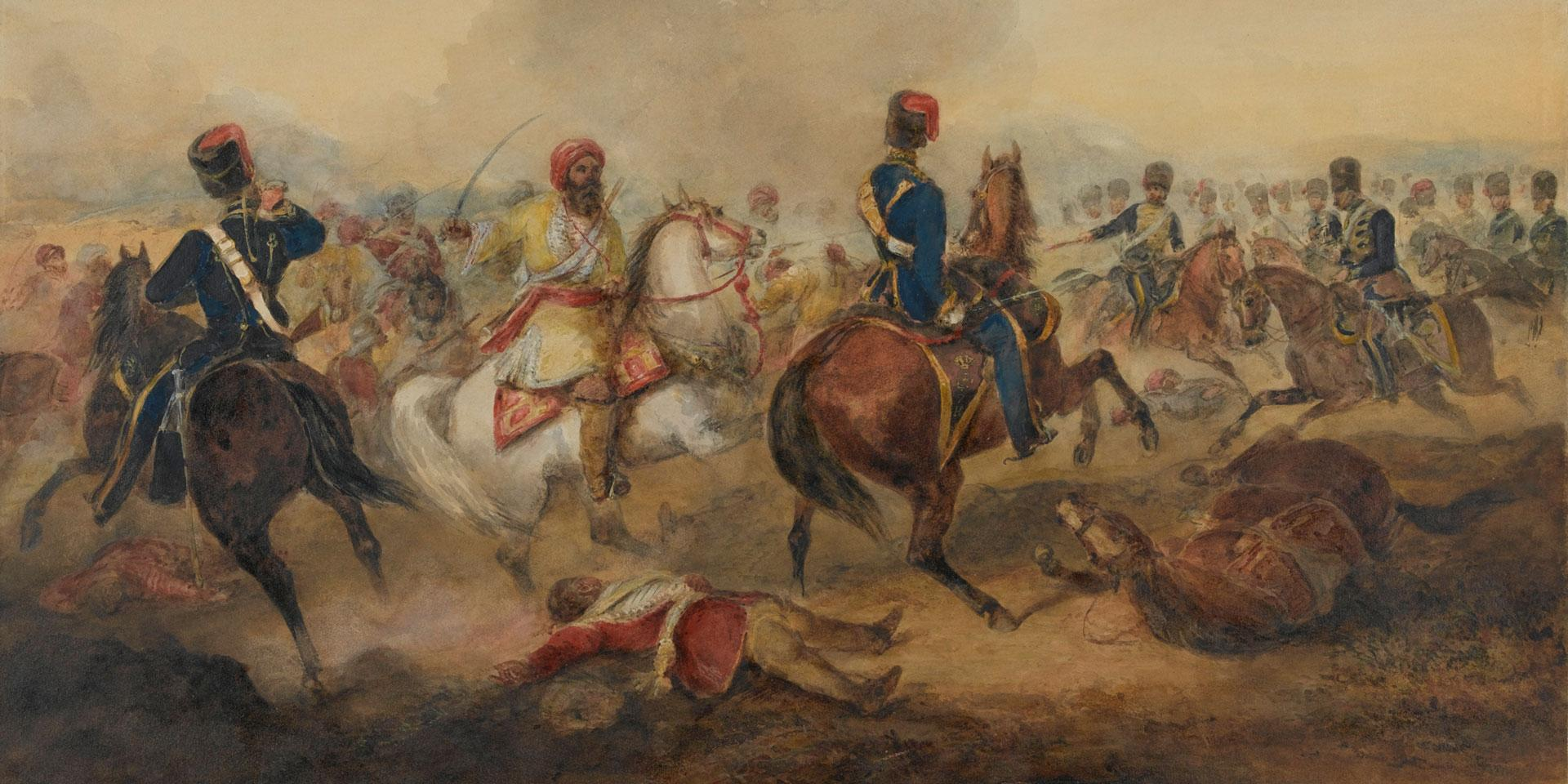
7th Hussars, charging a body of the Mutineers' Cavalry, Alambagh, Lucknow, Uttar Pradesh

The Indian Rebellion of 1857 was initiated by the 3rd Bengal Light Cavalry in Meerut, which was composed mainly of Indian Muslims. The mutineers made for Delhi, where its garrison revolted, massacring its British population, and installed Bahadur Shah Zafar as its nominal leader. The spread of the word that the British had been expelled from Delhi, interpreted as the breakdown of British authority, acted as a catalyst for mutiny as well as revolt. Regiments in other parts of northern India only revolted after Delhi had fallen. British characterisations of Muslims as fanatics took the fore during and after the Great Rebellion, as well as produced the Indian Muslims as a unified, cogent group, who were easily agitated, aggressive, and inherently disloyal.

=== Urdu nationalism ===
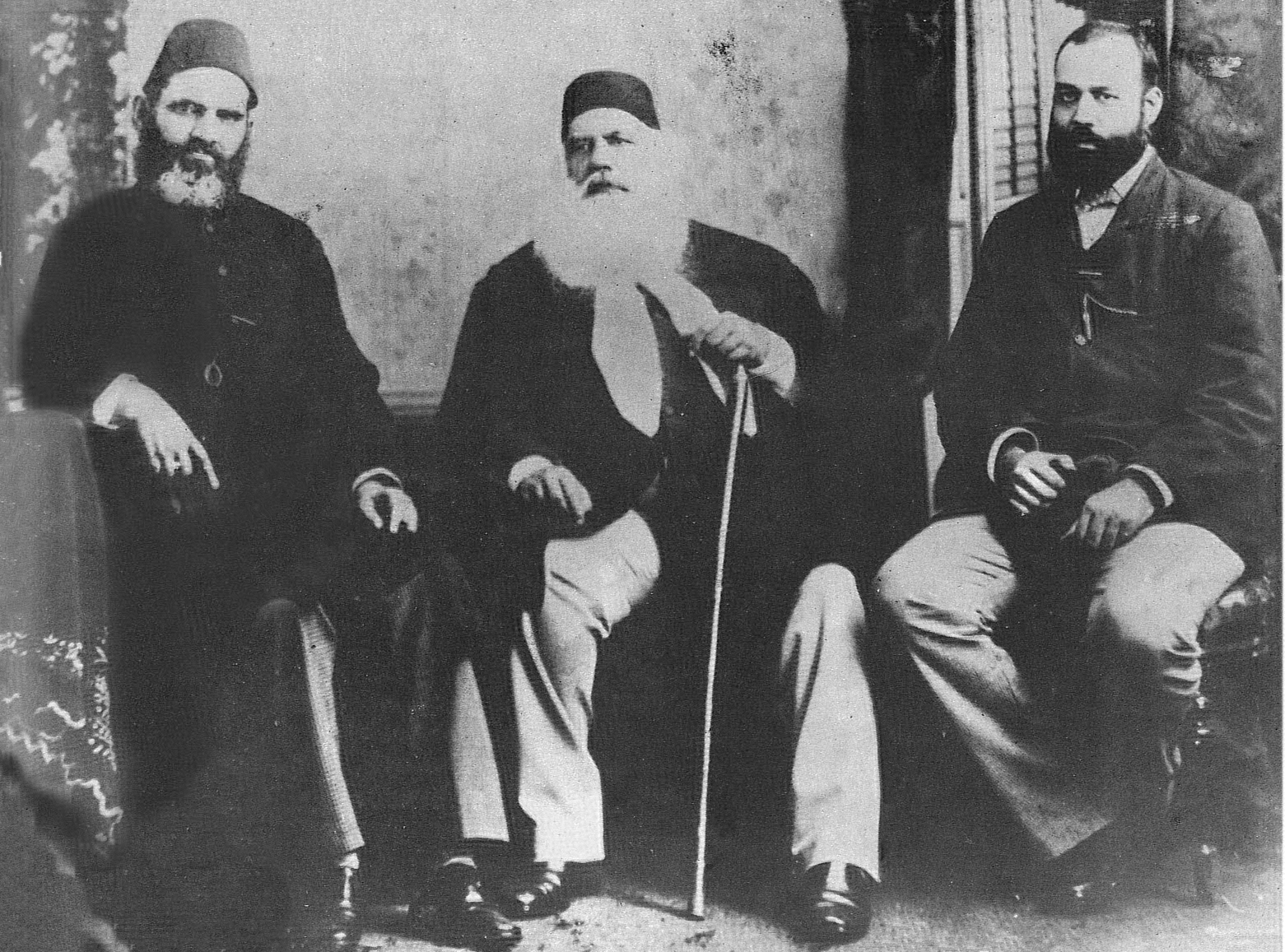
Syed Ahmed Khan and Mohsin-ul-Mulk

Even in later days, the same clans were dominant groups in the associations in the defence of Urdu and district Muslim Leagues which were among the first forays of Muslims into electoral and pressure-group politics. In the 19th century, Sir Syed Ahmed Khan and his followers such as Mohsin-ul-Mulk further advocated for the adoption of Urdu as the language of Indian Muslims, and led organisations such as the Anjuman-i Taraqqi-i Urdu and Urdu Defence Association, which won popular support in the Aligarh Movement and the Deoband Movement. It was made the official language of British India in 1825 and got large opposition from the Hindus and thus sparking the Hindi-Urdu controversy in 1867. This resulted in Sir Syed's two-nation theory in 1868. The Urdu language was used in the emergence of a political Muslim self-consciousness. Syed Ahmed Khan converted the existing cultural and religious entity among Indian Muslims into a separatist political force, throwing a Western cloak of nationalism over the Islamic concept of culture. Furthermore, in 2008, Syed Nadeem Ahmed brought forward the idea of Urdu nationalism by presenting his idea of an "Urdu Qaum" based on Urdu language and culture. The distinct sense of value, culture and tradition among Indian Muslims originated from the nature of Islamisation of the Indian populace during the Muslim conquests in the Indian subcontinent.

== Demographics ==
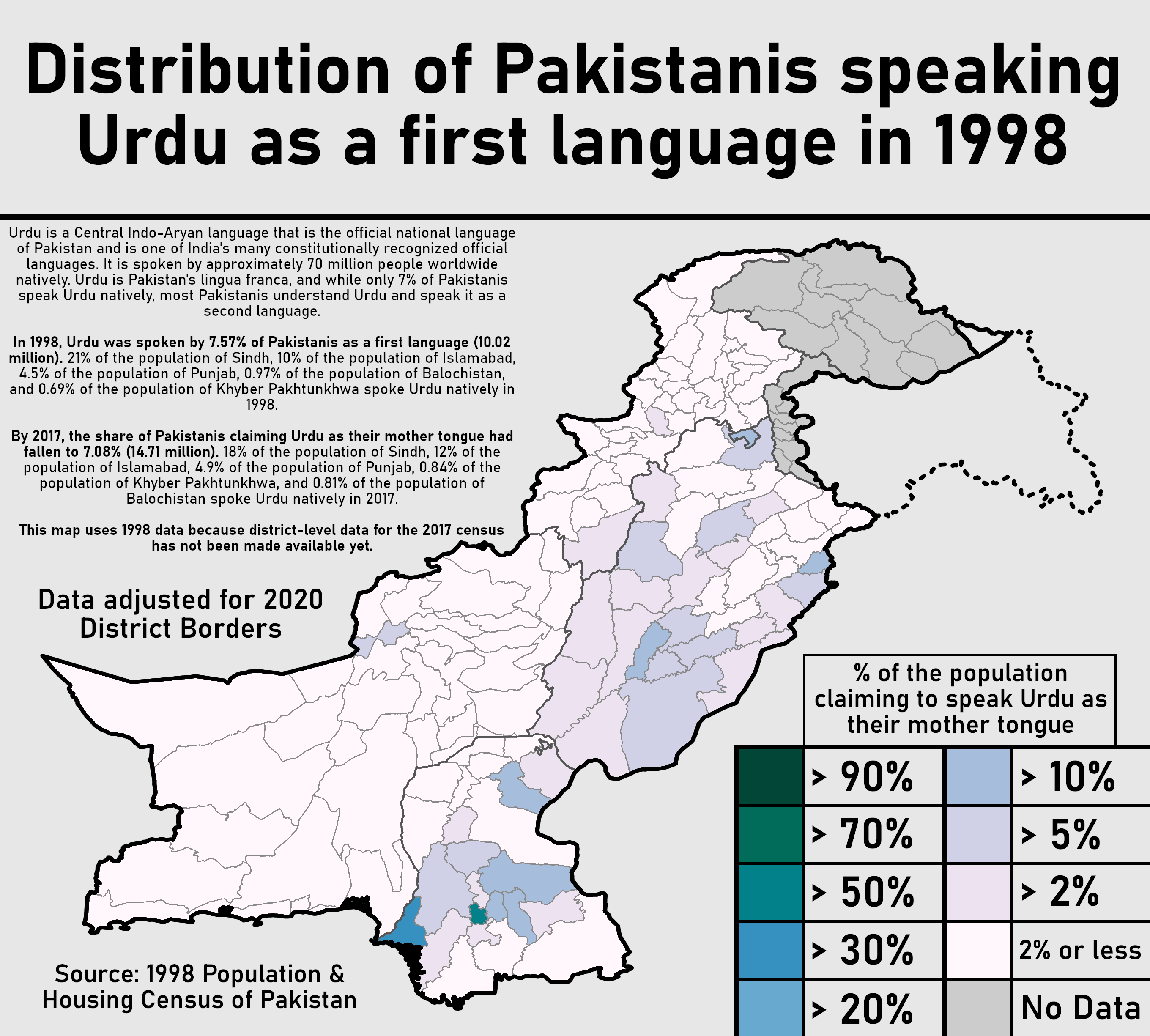
Distribution of Pakistanis speaking Urdu as a first language in 1998

Although the majority of Urdu-speakers reside in Pakistan (including 30 million native speakers, and up to 94 million second-language speakers), where Urdu is the national and official language, most speakers who use Urdu as their native tongue live in northern India, where it is one of 22 official languages.

The Urdu-speaking community is also present in other parts of the Indian subcontinent with a historical Muslim rule, such as the Deccanis, the Biharis (including in Bangladesh) and Dhakaiyas (who speak Dhakaiya Urdu) in Bangladesh, the Urdu-speaking members of the Madheshi community in Nepal, some Muslims in Sri Lanka and a section of Burmese Indians.

In addition, there are Urdu-speakers present among the South Asian diaspora, most notably in the Middle East, North America (notably the United States and Canada), Europe (notably the United Kingdom), the Caribbean region, Africa (notably South Africa and Mauritius), Southeast Asia (notably Singapore) and Oceania (notably Australia and Fiji).

== See also ==
- Urdu speakers by country
- States of India by Urdu speakers
