= Niceron =

Niceron or Nicéron is a surname. Notable people with the surname include:

- Jean François Niceron (1613–1646), French mathematician, Minim friar, and anamorphic artist
- Jean-Pierre Nicéron (1685–1738), French lexicographer, relative of Jean François
