= History of Muhajirs =

Muhajir History or History of Muhajirs refers to the history and origins of the Muhajir people in Pakistan. Most Muhajirs migrated from what is now Uttar Pradesh, Telangana, Rajasthan, Bihar, Gujarat, and West Bengal, and that results in close ties between the ethnic groups and histories.

== Mughal Empire ==
Muhajirs are sometimes called ''the grandchildren of Mughals''. Most of the Muhajir culture is derived from the Mughal culture, especially the cuisine. Many Muhajirs are descendants of Mughals. The development of Urdu, the most famous Muhajir language, as a common language of communication for people speaking different dialects is considered the greatest contribution in the field of literature during the Mughal rule. Mughals especially the later kings have the most vital role in the development and evolution of the Urdu language. They patronized literary men and created an enabling environment for the development of Urdu.

== 1857 War for Independence ==
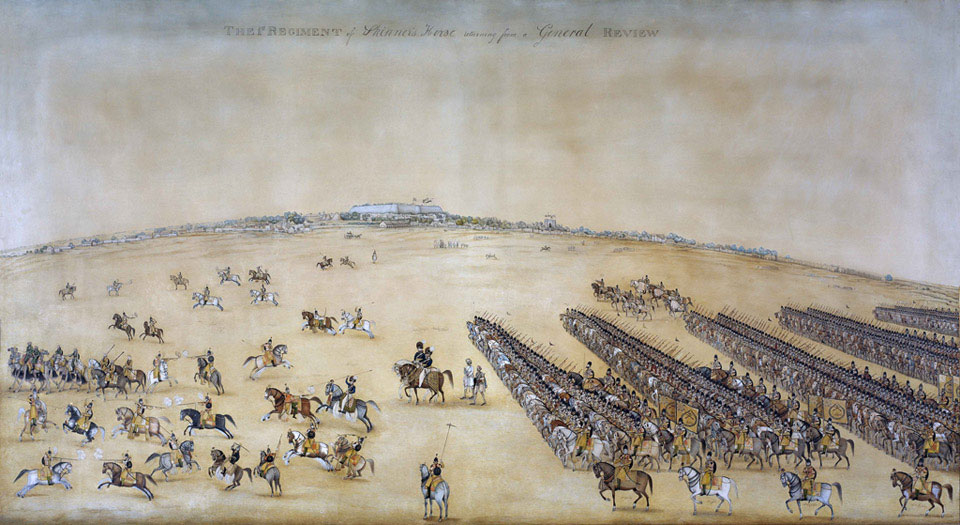
Review of the Indian Musket Cavalry, composed of Indian Muslims

The Indian Rebellion of 1857 was a major uprising in India in 1857–58 against the rule of the British East India Company, which functioned as a sovereign power on behalf of the British Crown. The rebellion began on 10 May 1857 in the form of a mutiny of sepoys of the company's army in the garrison town of Meerut, an Urdu-speaking city, 40 miles (64 km) northeast of Delhi. It then erupted into other mutinies and civilian rebellions chiefly in the upper Gangetic plain and central India. (Note: "The 1857 rebellion was by and large confined to northern Indian Gangetic Plain and central India.") (Note: "The revolt was confined to the northern Gangetic plain and central India.") Most of the rebellion took place in Urdu-speaking areas of India such as UP and Delhi, where Muhajirs are from.

== Pakistan Movement ==
The Pakistan Movement (Urdu: تحریکِ پاکستان, romanized: Teḥrīk-e-Pākistān) was a political movement in the first half of the 20th century that aimed for the creation of Pakistan from the Muslim-majority areas of British India. It was connected to the perceived need for self-determination for Muslims under British rule at the time. Muhammad Ali Jinnah lead this movement after the Pakistan Resolution was passed by the All-India Muslim League, on March 23, 1940.

The Pakistan Movement started originally as the Aligarh Movement, and as a result, the British Indian Muslims (mostly Urdu-speakers) began to develop a secular political identity. Soon thereafter, the All India Muslim League was formed, which perhaps marked the beginning of the Pakistan Movement. Many of the top leadership of the movement were educated in Great Britain, with many of them educated at the Aligarh Muslim University. Many graduates of the Dhaka University soon also joined. In 1937, the West Punjabis, Sindhis and Pushtuns rejected the AIML. Jinnah won in India's UP and elsewhere (with AIML second only to Congress in India overall), yet received almost absolute rejection in Pakistan. The largest support for independent Pakistan was from Muhajirs, chiefly from UP. Most of Pakistan's founders were Muhajirs.

== Migration ==
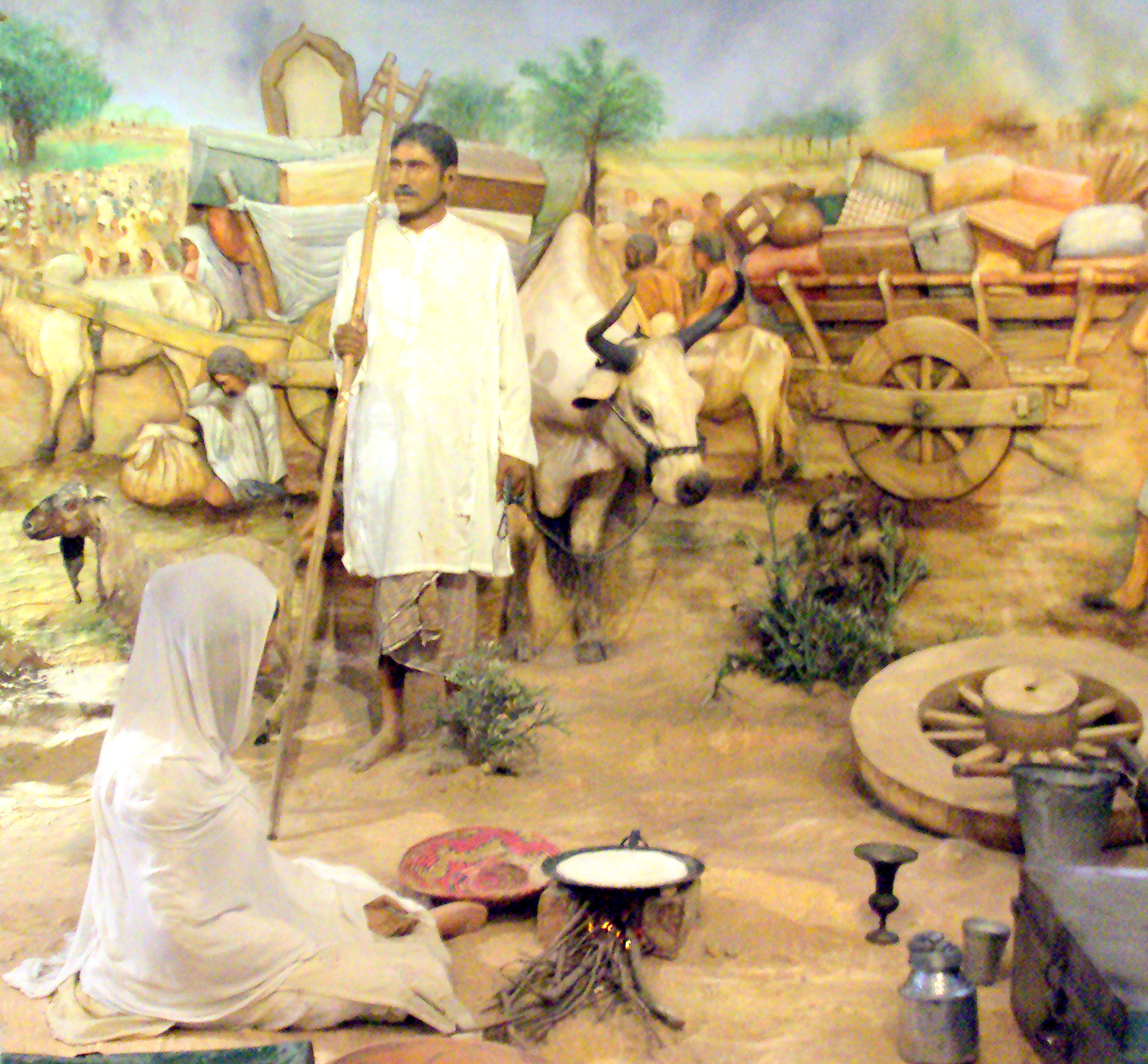
The photo monument depicting a couple migrating from India To Pakistan with their household stuff and cattle during Partition of India.

It was the largest involuntary migration in human history, many Muslims migrating from India to Pakistan were killed by Hindus and Sikhs, many Muslims lost their families. However, the Muslims struck back and killed many innocent Hindus and Sikhs as well, who were migrating from Pakistan to India.

=== First stage (August–November 1947) ===
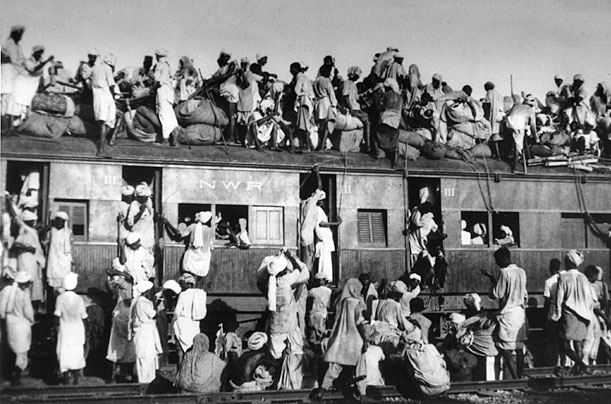
Muslim refugees boarding a train in September 1947, similar to those involved in the massacre, with the intent of fleeing India.

There were three predominant stages of Muslim migration from India to West Pakistan. The first stage lasted from August–November 1947. In this stage of migration the Muslim immigrants originated from East Punjab, Delhi, the four adjacent districts of U.P. and the princely states of Alwar and Bharatpur which are now part of the present day Indian state of Rajasthan. The violence affecting these areas during partition precipitated an exodus of Muslims from these areas to Pakistan. Punjabi Muslims from East Punjab crossed to West Punjab and settled in a culturally and linguistically similar environment.

The migration to Sindh was of a different nature to that in Punjab as the migrants to Sindh were ethnically heterog enous and were linguistically different from the locals. The migrants were also more educated than the natives, and predominantly rural, Sindhi Muslims who had been less educated and less prosperous than the former Sindhi Hindu residents, suffered as a result. The migrants, who were urban, also tended to regard the local Sindhis as "backwards" and subservient to landowners.

Prior to the partition, the majority of urban Sindh's population had been Hindu but after the independence of Pakistan in 1947, the majority of Sindh's Hindus migrated to India, although a substantial number of Hindus did remain in Sindh. 1.1 million Muslims from Uttar Pradesh, Bombay Presidency, Delhi and Rajasthan settled in their place; half in Karachi and the rest across Sindh's other cities. By the 1951 census, the migrants constituted 57 percent of the population of Karachi, 65 percent in Hyderabad and 55 percent in Sukkur. As Karachi was the capital of the new nation, educated urban migrants from Delhi, Uttar Pradesh, Bombay, Bihar and Hyderabad Deccan preferred it as their site of settlement for better access to employment opportunities. The migrants were compensated for their properties lost in India by being granted the evacuee property left behind by the departing Hindus. A sizable community of Malayali Muslims (the Mappila), originally from Kerala in South India, also settled in Karachi. The partition brought about quite exceptional circumstances that facilitated the implementation of these strategies.

=== Second stage (December 1947 – December 1971) ===
This film contrasts the old and new India and Pakistan, with emphasis on the Bangladesh and Kashmir disputes.

Many Muslim families from India continued migrating to Pakistan throughout the 1950s and even early 1960s. This second stage (December 1947 – December 1971) of the migration was from areas in the present-day Indian states of U.P., Delhi, Gujarat, Rajasthan, Maharashtra, Madhya Pradesh, Karnataka, Telangana, Andhra Pradesh, Tamil Nadu and Kerala. The main destination of these migrants was Karachi and the other urban centers of Sindh.

In 1959 the International Labor Organization (ILO) published a report stating that between the period of 1951–1956, a number of 650,000 Muslims from India relocated to West Pakistan. However, Visaria (1969) raised doubts about the authenticity of the claims about Indian Muslim migration to Pakistan, since the 1961 Census of Pakistan did not corroborate these figures. However, the 1961 Census of Pakistan did incorporate a statement suggesting that there had been a migration of 800,000 people from India to Pakistan throughout the previous decade. Of those who had left for Pakistan, most never came back. The Indian Prime Minister Jawaharlal Nehru conveyed distress about the continued migration of Indian Muslims to West Pakistan:

There has...since 1950 been a movement of some Muslims from India to Western Pakistan through the Jodhpur-Sindh via Khokhropar. Normally, traffic between India and West Pakistan was controlled by the permit system. But these Muslims going via Khokhropar went without permits to West Pakistan. From January 1952 to the end of September, 53,209 Muslim emigrants went via Khokhropar....Most of these probably came from the U.P. In October 1952, up to the 14th, 6,808 went by this route. After that Pakistan became much stricter on allowing entry on the introduction of the passport system. From 15 October to the end of October, 1,247 went by this route. From 1 November, 1,203 went via Khokhropar.

Indian Muslim migration to West Pakistan continued unabated despite the cessation of the permit system between the two countries and the introduction of the passport system between the two countries. The Indian Prime Minister Jawaharlal Nehru once again expressed concern at the continued migration of Indian Muslims to West Pakistan in a communication to one of his chief ministers (dated 1, December 1953):

A fair number of Muslims cross over to Pakistan from India, via Rajasthan and Sindh daily. Why do these Muslims cross over to Pakistan at the rate of three to four thousand a month? This is worth enquiring into, because it is not to our credit that this should be so. Mostly they come from Uttar Pradesh, Rajasthan or Delhi. It is evident that they do not go there unless there is some fear or pressure on them. Some may go in the hope of employment there. But most of them appear to feel that there is no great future for them in India. I have already drawn your attention to difficulties in the way of Government service. Another reason, I think, is the fear of Evacuee Property Laws [EPL]. I have always considered these laws both in India and Pakistan as most iniquitous. In trying to punish a few guilty persons, we punish or injure large numbers of perfectly innocent people...the pressure of the Evacuee Property Laws applies to almost all Muslims in certain areas of India. They cannot easily dispose of their property or carry on trade for fear that the long arm of this law might hold them down in its grip. It is this continuing fear that comes in the way of normal functioning and normal business and exercises a powerful pressure on large numbers of Muslims in India, especially in the North and the West.

In 1952 the passport system was introduced for travel purposes between the two countries. This made it possible for Indian Muslims to legally move to Pakistan. Pakistan still required educated and skilled workers to absorb into its economy at the time, due to relatively low levels of education in the regions which became part of Pakistan. As late as December 1971, the Pakistan High Commission in New Delhi was authorized to issue documents to educationally qualified Indians to migrate to Pakistan. The legal route was taken by unemployed but educated Indian Muslims seeking better fortunes, however poorer Muslims from India continued to go illegally via the Rajasthan-Sindh border until the 1965 India-Pakistan war when that route was shut. After the conclusion of the 1965 war, most Muslims who wanted to go to Pakistan had to go there via the India-East Pakistani border. Once reaching Dhaka, most made their way to the final destination-Karachi. However, not all managed to reach West Pakistan from East Pakistan.

A large number of Urdu-speaking Muslims from Bihar went to East Pakistan after the independence of India and Pakistan in 1947. After the formation of Bangladesh in 1971, the Biharis maintained their loyalty to Pakistan and wanted to leave Bangladesh for Pakistan. The majority of these people still await repatriation, however, 178,000 have been repatriated. In 2015, the Pakistani government stated that the remaining 'Stranded Pakistanis' are not its responsibility but rather the responsibility of Bangladesh.

=== Third stage (1973-1990s) ===
The third stage which lasted between 1973 and the 1990s was when migration levels of Indian Muslims to Pakistan was reduced to its lowest levels since 1947.

Indian Muslim migration to Pakistan had declined drastically by the 1970s, a trend noticed by the Pakistani authorities. In June 1995, Pakistan's interior minister, Naseerullah Babar, informed the National Assembly that between the period of 1973–1994, as many as 800,000 visitors came from India on valid travel documents. Of these, only 3,393 stayed. In a related trend, intermarriages between Indian and Pakistani Muslims have declined sharply. According to a November 1995 statement of Riaz Khokhar, the Pakistani High Commissioner in New Delhi, the number of cross-border marriages has declined from 40,000 a year in the 1950s and 1960s to barely 300 annually.

== Sources ==
- Bose, Sugata; Jalal, Ayesha (2004), Modern South Asia: History, Culture, Political Economy (2nd ed.), London: Routledge, p. 253, ISBN 978-0-415-30787-1
- David, Saul (2003), The Indian Mutiny: 1857, London: Penguin Books, p. 528, ISBN 978-0-14-100554-6
- Marshall, P. J. (2007), The Making and Unmaking of Empires: Britain, India, and America c.1750–1783, Oxford and New York: Oxford University Press., p. 400, ISBN 978-0-19-922666-5
