= Ovington =

Ovington may refer to:

== Places ==
In England:

- Ovington, County Durham
- Ovington, Essex
- Ovington, Hampshire
- Ovington, Norfolk
- Ovington, Northumberland

== People with the surname ==
- John Ovington (1653–1731), an English priest
- Earle Ovington, American inventor
- Henry Alexander Ovington (1796-1886), Assistant Chamberlain of New York City.
- Mary White Ovington, American civil rights activist
