= Jean-Pierre Nicéron =

French encyclopedist

Jean-Pierre Nicéron (11 March 1685 – 8 July 1738) was a French lexicographer.

== Biography ==
Nicéron was born in Paris, a relative of the mathematician and Minim friar Jean François Niceron. After his studies at the Collège Mazarin, he joined the Barnabites, where he had an uncle, in August, 1702. Nicéron taught rhetoric in the college of Loches, and soon after at Montargis, where he remained ten years.

While engaged in teaching, Nicéron made a thorough study of modern languages. In 1716 he went to Paris and devoted his time to literary work. His aim was to put together, in a logically arranged compendium, a series of biographical and bibliographical articles on the men who had distinguished themselves in literature and sciences since the time of the Renaissance.

After eleven years Nicéron published the first volume of his monumental work under the title of "Mémoires pour servir à l'histoire des hommes illustres de la république des lettres avec le catalogue raisonné de leurs ouvrages" (Paris, 1727). Thirty-eight volumes followed from 1728 to 1738. The last volume from his pen was published two years after the author's death (Paris, 1740).Casimir Oudin, J.-B. Michauld, and Abbé Goujet later contributed three volumes to the collection and a German translation of it was published in 1747–1777.

Louis Delamarre the author of Nicéron's biography in the Catholic Encyclopedia states it has been said that "Mémoires" lacks method, and that the length of many articles is out of proportion to the value of the men to whom they are devoted, but the work does contain a great amount of information that could hardly be obtained elsewhere. They refer also to sources which could be easily overlooked or ignored.

Nicéron translated also various books from English, including "Le voyage de John Ovington à Surate et en divers autres lieux de l'Asie et de l'Afrique, avec l'histoire de la révolution arrivée dans le royaume de Golconde" (Paris, 1725); "La Conversion de l'Angleterre au Christianisme comparée avec sa prétendue réformation" (Paris, 1729).
