= Garha =

Muslim caste of India

Gada Muslims
Regions with significant populations
- India, Pakistan

Languages
- Hindi • Urdu • Punjabi

Religion
- Islam

Garha (also spelled Gaud, Gada ) are a Muslim community in the subcontinent. They live pre-dominantly in the states of Punjab, Delhi, Uttar Pradesh, Haryana, Uttarakhand and Rajasthan.

== History and origin ==
The Garha have 51 sub-divisions, known as biradari. Some of these are based on territorial groupings and some on the sects and castes they belonged prior to their conversion to Islam. Their main biradari is the Gaur Brahmin. Some Garha sub-groups descent from the Gaur (Clan) of Rajput. But most of Gada groups are descent from the Gaur Brahmin community, and Garha is the khadi boli transformation of the original Sanskrit word "Gauda" which means "fair one" an allusion to the learnedness and high status.

Some Garha Biradari sub-groups also descent from the tribe of Muhammad Ghouri or Muhammad of Ghor. They merged with the Gaur Muslims through marriage and political alliance and use surname Ghouri or Gouri and Ghazi. Although as per Historical evidences, Muhammad Ghori didn't have any sons, his only child was his daughter who died in his lifetime.

Thus it can be concluded that Gaur Muslims are a mixed community of Gaur Brahmin (major and the main part), Rajput and Gauri Turk.

The Garha have a caste association, called the Anjuman Garha (Garha association), whose primary purpose is to look after their socio-economic welfare. The association runs schools imparting education and making arrangements of boarding house for poors. They live in multi-caste villages, occupying their own quarters and they are landlords and well educated as well as powerful. They are upper caste and Swarn or Ashraaf.

The community comprises mostly peasants called Lambardaar, Gour, Padhaan, Zamindaar, Jagirdar, Chaudhary, Gauri and Ghazi concentrated in the Doab region of Uttar Pradesh and neighbouring Haridwar District of Uttarakhand and Yamuna Nagar district of Haryana. Each of their settlements contains a village-based caste council, known as a biradari panchayat, which acts as an instrument of social control and resolves intra-community disputes. In terms of religion, they are fairly orthodox Sunni Muslims, and have customs similar to other neighbouring Muslim peasant castes such as Muslim Tagas, Muslim Jats, Ranghars and Rohillas. The Garha speak Urdu, Hindi, Punjabi and the local Khari boli dialect.

== See also ==
- Gaur Brahmins
- Gaur Rajputs
- Muhammad ibn Suri
