= Jean François Niceron =

Jean-François Niceron (5 July 1613 – 22 September 1646) was a French mathematician, Minim friar, and painter of anamorphic art, on which he wrote the ground-breaking book La Perspective Curieuse (Curious Perspectives).

== Biography ==
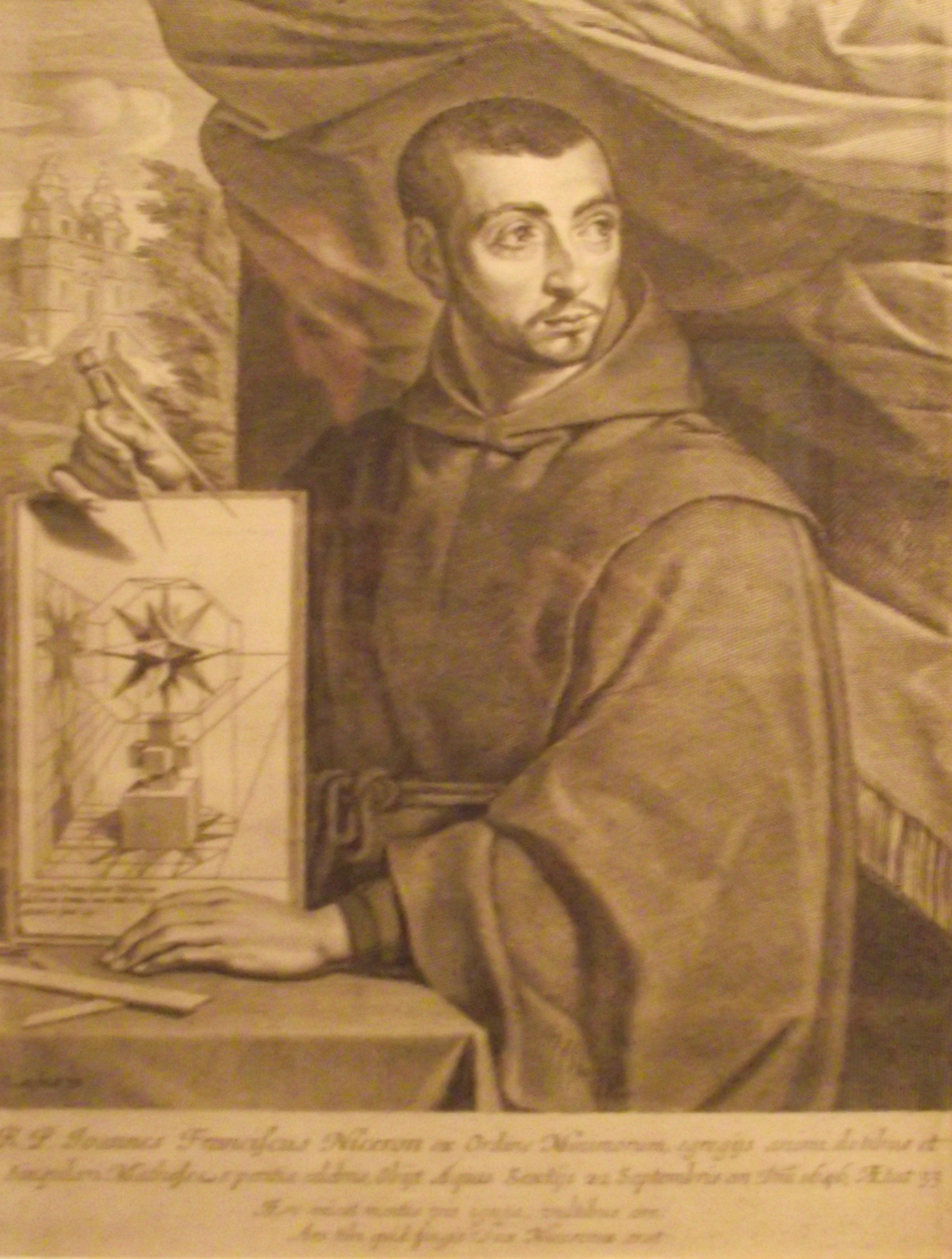

Jean-François Niceron was a mathematical prodigy. He studied under Father Marin Mersenne, a famed mathematician and Minim friar, at the College de Nevers. In 1632, at the age of nineteen, he joined the Order of Minims.

Niceron was also an artist, with a particular interest in the use of anamorphosis in religious art. He was acquainted with the leading scientists in France and Italy, such as Fermat, Descartes, Cavalieri, and Kircher, and was aware of the latest theoretical developments. Intent on finding a scientific solution to the problems presented by perspective, Niceron worked out the geometric algorithms for producing anamorphic art and in 1638, at the age of 25, published a treatise titled La perspective curieuse, ou magie artificielle des effets merveilleux (roughly translated as "The curious perspective or artificial magic of marvelous effects").

As a number of scientific societies formed in the early 1630s, Niceron became a member of the Circle of Mersenne, which was named after his mentor, Father Marin Mersenne. His connection with these societies led to associations with some of the top intellectuals from Paris and Rome. These relationships with the academic world helped him stay up to date with intellectual advancements. He closely followed optics and geometry, and used this knowledge to create the anamorphic paintings for which he is known.

He died in 1646 in Aix-en-Provence, aged 33. His portrait was engraved by Lasne.

The lexicographer Jean-Pierre Nicéron was a relative.

== Publications ==
- La perspective curieuse, ou magie artificielle des effets merveilleux (Paris, 1638, in-fol., reissued together with l'Optique and Catoptrique by P. Mersenne, ibid., 1652, in-fol.)

Niceron reworked La perspective curieuse, augmented it with new observations, and translated it into Latin under the title Thaumaturgus opticus, sive amiranda optices, etc. (Paris, 1646, in-fol.) This was to have been followed by two other editions, but Niceron died before he could complete them. The 1638 and 1663 editions are both available online.

La perspective curieuse, a richly illustrated manual on perspective, revealed for the first time the secrets of anamorphosis and trompe l'oeil. It contained the first published reference to Descartes's derivation of the law of refraction. First published in 1638 with 25 plates, Niceron's work was enlarged by Roberval and republished in 1663, along with the first edition, posthumously published, of a scholarly work on optics and catoptrics by Mersenne (1588–1648). In the original work, Niceron concentrated primarily on the practical applications of perspective, catoptrics, and dioptrics, and on the illusory effects of optics, then traditionally associated with natural magic. The work's first book (out of four) presents briefly the fundamental geometrical theorems and then develops a general method of perspective, borrowing heavily from Alberti and Dürer. The second book addresses the problem of establishing perspective for paintings executed on curved or irregular surfaces, like vaults and niches, and presents the general technique of anamorphosis. Here Niceron shows, for example, how to construct on the interior surface of a cone a distorted image that, when viewed from the end through the base, appears in proper proportion. Book three discusses and explains the anamorphosis of figures that are viewed by reflection from plane, cylindrical, and conical mirrors. Book four deals with the distortions created by refraction. The added work on optics by Mersenne contained the author's final contributions to optics, including experimental studies of visual acuity and binocular vision and a critical discussion of contemporary hypotheses on the nature of light.

- L'Interprétation des chiffres, ou Règle pour bien entendre et expliquer facilement toutes sortes de chiffres simples, tirée de italien et augmentée, particulièrement à l'usage des langues française et espagnole (Paris, 1641, in-8°). This work has been translated in part by Ant.-Marie Cospi.

== See also ==
- List of Roman Catholic scientist-clerics

== Other sources ==
- The painting at the Museum of the History of Science in Florence
- The Galileo project
- Mersenne's ‘'catoptrique'’ contains Niceron's plates
- First World Exhibition on Jean François Niceron at University Iuav of Venezia from 22 April until 31 May 2013
- “Jean François Niceron and Emmanuel Maignan: two Minim fathers, between science and faith”, exhibition curated by Alessio Bortot, Agostino De Rosa and Imago rerum, from 7 October 2023 to 6 January 2024 and from 27 March to 8 September 2024, in the Exhibition Hall of the Sanctuary of San Francesco di Paola in Paola, (CS). The exhibition offers an unprecedented experience which, through physical works and digital reconstructions, will allow visitors to take a journey between science, art and faith.
- Joe Frawley, "Curious Perspectives", Joe Frawley Music (ca476) (7 November 2011). Music composed by Joe Frawley for the exhibition "Jean François Niceron: Perspective, catoptrics & artificial magic", University Iuav, Venice, Italy, 22 April – 31 May 2013 .
