= Urdu in the United Kingdom =

British Urdu
- برطانوی اردو
- Pronunciation: [ˈbəɾt̪ɑːnʋiː ˈʊrduː]
- Ethnicity: British Asians
- Speakers: 270,000 (2021)
- Language family: Indo-European: Indo-Iranian; Indo-Aryan; Central Zone; Western Hindi; Hindustani; Urdu; British Urdu
- Writing system: Perso-Arabic (Urdu alphabet)

Language codes
- ISO 639-1: ur
- ISO 639-2: urd
- ISO 639-3: urd
- Glottolog: urdu1245 Urdu

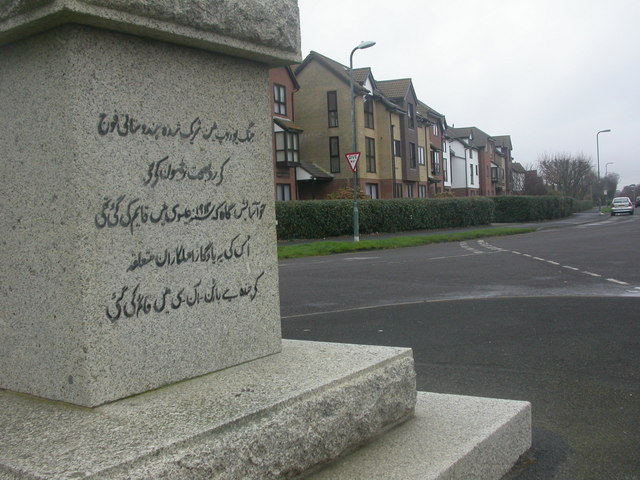
Urdu inscription on an obelisk in Barton about the First World War.

Urdu literature اردو ادب
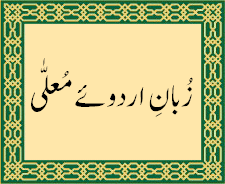

Urdu literature
- By category Urdu language Rekhta

Major figures
- Amir Khusrau - Wali Dakhani - Mir Taqi Mir - Ghalib - Abdul Haq - Muhammad Iqbal

Urdu writers
- Writers – Novelists – Poets

Forms
- Ghazal - Dastangoi - Nazm – Fiction

Institutions
- Anjuman-i Taraqqi-i Urdu; Urdu movement Literary Prizes

Urdu in the United Kingdom (Urdu: برطانیہ میں اردو) is the fourth most commonly spoken language. According to the 2021 census, 270,000 people (0.5% of UK residents) listed Urdu as their main language, an increase of 1,000 from 2011. Ethnologue reports the total number of Urdu speakers in the UK at over 400,000. Since the 1990s, the Department of Health has issued patient information (pamphlets etc.) in Urdu in conjunction with local authorities, which has also led other organisations, institutions and councils to publish public information in Urdu.

== Education ==
=== History ===
Britain's Anglophone tradition and inheritance centralises English as the national lingua and vernacular. Radical opportunities exist, however, for the productive growth of minority Commonwealth migrant languages such as Urdu and Punjabi, particularly in curriculum-based education, and many Urdu literary societies exist in the UK, such as the CU Urdu society. The history of Urdu in British Education can be traced to as early as the 1800s when Hindustani was being taught to EIC recruits and civil servants, which was mandatory for those wishing to join the Indian Civil Service. For this reason, the East India Company founded the Oriental Institute in London, in 1816.

In Britain, Urdu has been standardised for education, and opportunities to incorporate Urdu as part of teaching exist all the way from primary education to a PhD in Urdu. Urdu books are also widely found in British libraries, where in 1967, Britain's first Urdu library was opened in Nottingham.

=== England and Wales ===
In 1841, a grammar school in Gloucester began teaching Urdu to British children, which entailed other institutions to follow, such as the University College, London, followed by the University of Oxford and the University of Cambridge by 1859.

Curriculum-wise, students in the UK are able to take Urdu as a GCSE and A-Level subject, which is examined by the AQA and Edexcel exam-board, and in 2015, Manchester Metropolitan University became the first university in the UK to offer an Urdu degree. Around 5,000 students in England take Urdu as a GCSE subject every year, and as per Ofqual, in 2024, 4,370 students certified in GCSE Urdu, an increase of 5% from the year before.

=== Scotland ===
Urdu became the first non-European language which was recognised at a Higher level, back in 2006, when the SQA (Scottish Qualifications Authority) incorporated Urdu as a Higher subject for the first time. In 2022, 90 students partook an Urdu exam at Higher level.

== Media ==
=== Periodicals ===
==== 1880s-1920s ====
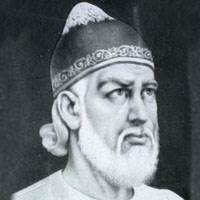
Ghulam Hamdani Mushafi, the poet first believed to have coined the name "Urdu" around 1780 AD for a language that went by a multiplicity of names before his time.

One of the earliest Urdu periodicals in the UK was established in London during the 1880-90s, and was known as the Ainah-e-Angrezi Saudagri (آئینۂ انگریزی سوداگری) – Mirror of British Merchandise and, undoubtedly, it revolved mainly around trade relations with the Raj. Following this, Urdu periodicals transpired during the First World War, when the Urdu press was established by the British government during the 1910s, when publications like Jangi Akhbar (the War Journal) emerged, shortly after Urdu captions being discontinued from the pictorial newspaper Al-Haqiqah – the Truth. Similar newspapers, like the فوجی اخبار (Fauji Akhbar – the Military Newspaper) also existed in London. It carried on until 1919, post World War I, which paved way for the Taswiri Akhbar (the Pictorial News) paper. In 1920, a newspaper by the name of ہند – Hind (which was later rebranded to United India) was established by some Indian students, which supposedly held on until 1930.

==== Immigration Era Press ====
The wave of migrants during the 1950s from South Asian countries like India and Pakistan, following World War II, introduced the modern era of Urdu periodicals in Britain. These Urdu papers were distinct in their approach and pattern of ownership and coverage. Urdu papers up until 1965 were all launched by immigrants from Pakistan and quickly became the source of communication for immigrants from Pakistan, due to the lack of coverage of news in British media regarding their homeland.

Weekly newspapers such as نوائے وقت – Nawa-e-Waqt (The Voice of the Time) published 'overseas editions' that were sent over to Britain, however, due to issues in logistics, it was unable to satisfy demand and eventually collapsed. In 1961, a weekly by the name of مشرق – Mashriq ('The East') was launched by a student, along with an editor of a Pakistani daily. The Mashriq, which published stories from the Pothohar Plateau from London, was embraced by the immigrants at the time, as a source of unity for a various reasons.

As a modern paper, it introduced advertisements for various industries, such as the Urdu magazines and Urdu cinemas. The paper would print rights on the columns to raise awareness. It continued on until the 1970s, when its decline came about due to the rise of the daily Urdu press. The Mashriq remained as the sole Urdu newspaper in Britain during this period until the launch of the weekly 'Asia' from Birmingham, setup by a Pakistani journalist from Azad Kashmir. It was eventually taken over by 'Mashriq' in 1969 to be turned into a daily in '71, however this again did not last as the paper turned into a weekly a year later, before finally disappearing.

The first non-Pakistani Urdu paper was published by an Indian Punjabi in August 1965, and was known as ملاپ – Milap (Reunion). Other weeklies like اخبارِ وطن – Akhbar-e-Watan (News of the Homeland) were brought out in London, in 1969 by the veteran journalist Inayat Ullah, who also launched The Mashriq, followed by جنگ – the Daily Jang (The War) in 1971. The latter is one of the few papers that has published regularly since its inception. Since then, many weekly, fortnightly, and monthly Urdu language periodicals were once published in the UK.

==== 21st century ====
Aside from BBC Urdu, The Independent, which was previously a print newspaper, operates an Urdu-branded website, which began in 2018. The Daily Al-Fazl, run by the Ahmadiyya Muslim Community, which started in Qadian, Punjab, India, launched its weekly international service in 1994. Since 2015, Daily Al-Fazl has shifted to Tilford, Surrey where it is published from. Other newspapers like the Daily Jang continue to operate a London Edition, which can be obtained from libraries.

=== Digital Media ===
==== Television ====
BBC Urdu, part of the BBC News network, is based in London and covers relevant news in the Urdu language, typically aimed towards middle-class Urdu speakers. It serves as a bridge for the Pakistani diaspora and certain parts of the Indian diaspora in the UK. In 2024, the Easter Sunday service at the Canterbury Cathedral, which was broadcast by the BBC included a segment in which the Lord's Prayer was led in Urdu, along with subtitles in English.

Other renowned Urdu television stations, usually based in Pakistan, such as PTV and ARY Digital UK are also typically broadcast on the Sky UK platform, while some Pakistani Urdu dramas are also broadcast on Indian channels like Zee Entertainment.

==== Radio ====
BBC Urdu began its radio service back in 1940, when it was known as 'BBC Hindustani', launched to mitigate wartime misinformation. Following the Partition of India, it was renamed to 'BBC Urdu', and continued until 2022 after which it was discontinued. Many other radio stations in Urdu are broadcast throughout the UK. A rugby match featuring the Huddersfield Giants was broadcast on a local station with Urdu commentary.

== Geographic distribution ==
The largest Urdu-speaking communities in the UK are predominantly found in Northern England. Urdu is the most spoken language, after English, in cities like Manchester, where in certain areas like Rusholme, Longsight and Cheetham Hill, signs and posters in Urdu are a common sight, and often used to promote businesses and products. London and Bradford are considered two major Urdu centres, among cities like Islamabad, Karachi and Lahore.

As per the 2021 UK Census in England and Wales
City	Region	Number	Percentage
Birmingham	West Midlands	25,131	2.28%
Manchester	North West England	17,672	3.31%
Bradford	Yorkshire and the Humber	15,270	2.91%
Luton	London	8,714	4.04%
Redbridge	London	8,315	2.79%
Newham	London	7,438	2.21%
Bolton	North West England	7,144	2.51%
Kirklees	Yorkshire and the Humber	6,857	1.64%
Slough	South East England	6,497	4.28%
Oldham	North West England	5,598	2.41%
Rochdale	North West England	5,218	2.43%

== Politics ==
Queen Victoria was taught to write Urdu after requesting her servant Abdul Karim, who had arrived in England to deliver a seal mark celebrating the Queen's Golden Jubilee. She began learning in 1887, and also began keeping a diary written in Urdu, which she called her 'Hindustani Journal', totalling 13 volumes altogether.

When Pakistani-origin Scottish MSP Bashir Ahmad was elected to the Scottish Parliament in 2007, he took his oath in both English and Urdu. Similarly, the ex-First Minister of Scotland, Humza Yousaf, also took his oath in Urdu when he became an MP in 2016.

In February 2026, the Green Party released leaflets, which had a picture of Green Party politician Hannah Spencer in front of a mosque, wearing a Keffiyeh. On the other side of the leaflet was a message written in Urdu, criticising the Reform UK and Labour parties. Hannah Spencer of the Green Party also created an advert in Urdu for the Gorton and Denton by-election.

== See also ==
- List of English words of Hindi or Urdu origin
- Glossary of the British Raj
- Roman Urdu
- BBC Urdu
- BBC India
- Languages of the United Kingdom
