= Kanmailia =

The Kanmailia are a Muslim community found in the state of Uttar Pradesh in India. Their preferred self-designation is Shaikh.
