= Tyagi =

Regions with significant populations
- India

Languages
- Urdu • Hindi • Khadi Boli

Religion
- Hinduism • Islam

Related ethnic groups
- Garha • Jats • Gurjars • Meds

Tyagi, originally called Taga, is a cultivator caste who claim Brahmin status. The landholding community is confined to Western Uttar Pradesh, Haryana, Delhi and Rajasthan, in India. They are often considered the highest of the agricultural castes. During the British Raj, they changed their name from Taga to Tyagi, and began claiming Brahmin status. As of a 1990 report by the Backward Classes Commission, Government of Haryana, they were mostly engaged in farming. The Government of Haryana granted reservation to Tyagis along with five other castes in 2016. However, the Punjab and Haryana High Court shortly put a stay on the government's order.

== Religion ==
The name Tyagi is prevalent in both Hindu and Muslim communities. Community members who embraced Islam are known as Muslim Tyagis, Mulla Brahmin, Musalman Taga, Mahesra and Moolay Taga.

== Diet ==
Members of the community are generally vegetarian but some do eat non-veg food.
