= Kingharia =

Muslim community in India

The Kingharia are a Muslim community found in the state of Uttar Pradesh in India and Nepal. They are also known as Panwariya.
