= Kankali =

The Kankali are a Muslim community found in the state of Uttar Pradesh in India. They are also known as Kankal and Mangta. They are not to be confused with the Kankalis, a nomad tribe of Central Asia.
