= Rangrez =

The Rangrez are an Indian caste and mostly part of the dyeing community. They are mainly Hindu and most live in the Marwar region, and the states of Bihar and Uttar Pradesh. A significant minority are Muslims.

== See also ==
- Savji
- Bhavsar
