= Qawm =

Social unit in Afghanistan

Qawm is a basic social unit of Afghanistan that is based on kinship, residence, or occupation. It is sometimes translated as "tribe", but the qawm relationship may cross tribal or even ethnic boundaries.

The protean word qawm is of Arabic origin, and is used in Afghanistan to refer to any form of solidarity. Afghans identify themselves by qawm, rather than by tribe or nationality. Qawm identity has added to the challenge of creating a national identity in Afghanistan. A qawm is typically governed by a jirga or shura (a council or assembly of elder males).

== Islamic background of the term ==
According to Youshaa Patel, in the Muslim world, qawm is a heterogeneous term denoting a network of social relationships representing a people, nation, community or group. It is one of Arabic terms used to collectively refer to Muslims alongside umma, milla, dīn, qabīla (qəbilə), jamāʿa, and shaʿb. In the Quran, it often has ethno-national, moral, and religious connotations, such as in the "qawm of Noah", "corrupt qawm", and "qawm of unbelievers".

== See also ==
- Ethnic groups in Afghanistan
