= Baradari (brotherhood) =

Social stratum in Indian and Pakistani culture

Barādarī (also spelled Birādrī or Biraderi; Urdu: برادری) means "brotherhood", and refers to the various tribes or clans found among South Asian Muslims. The word originates from the Farsi word Baradar (Persian: برادر), meaning "brother".

== History ==
According to British author Anatol Lieven, "the most important force in Pakistani society" are Baradaris, as political parties and alliances are usually based primarily on tribal affiliation, rather than any competing religious, ethnic, or ideological cause. The system is strongest in Pakistani Punjab, where rural tribes of Jutts, Rajputs, Gujjars, Arains, and Awans are dominant. The system is also present in Sindh, though it is comparatively less influential.

Baradaris have also influenced politics in some parts of the United Kingdom, where a significant number of people are of Pakistani descent, most notably in Bradford.

== See also ==
- Caste system among South Asian Muslims
- Phratry, an institution of Ancient Greece similar in meaning and etymology.
