= John Ovington =

English ecclesiastical writer and traveler

John Ovington (1653–1731) was an English priest known for his travel narrative A Voyage to Surat in the Year 1689, which described his journey to Surat and his experiences there as an East India Company chaplain. Ovington travelled to India on the Benjamin, disembarking for a few days in Bombay before settling in Surat where he was to live for two and a half years. His travel memories, translated into French by Niceron in 1725 under the title of "Voyages made to Surate & other places in Asia & Africa", depict Bombay as a city of debauchery populated by prostitutes and drunkards. From his stay in Surat, Ovington describes the Mughal influence, the religious and cultural particularities of the Hindus and the Parses, and finally speculates on the status of the fakir, a Muslim hermit. Ovington describes the tea ceremony and praises the drink's consumption, a stance that earned him criticism from Alexander Hamilton. But the most interesting aspect of Ovington's travels is still his description of the organization and procedures of the English manufacture in Surat. Of all the travel accounts of this period, those of Ovington are, according to Riddick, the most interesting and the most witty.

== Writings ==
- A Voyage to Surat in the Year 1689, (1698), impr. Jacob Tonson, Londres.
- An essay upon the nature and qualities of tea (1699), impr. R. Robert, Londres.
