= Shaikh =

Shaikh usually refers to:

- Sheikh, as an alternate Romanization; a term for elders, tribal leaders, and royalty in Arabic-influenced cultures

It may also refer to:

== Given name ==
- Shaikh Yahya bin Ahmed Afifi (1890–1940), Singaporean politician
- Shaikh Shamim Ahmed (1938–2019), Indian politician and social worker
- Shaikh Rabiul Alam (born 1971), Bangladeshi politician
- Shaikh Muhammad Amir, Bengali Muslim painter
- Shaikh Rohale Asghar (born 1952), Pakistani politician
- Shaikh Ayaz (1923–1997), Sindhi language poet and prose writer
- Shaikh Amadou Ba (1830–1875), Tijani prophetic leader
- Shaikh Nazrul Bakar (1913–1966), Pakistani civil servant
- Shaikh Farid Bukhari (died 1616), Mughal noble
- Shaikh Bahlol Daryai (1515–1575), Punjabi Sufi saint
- Shaikh Abdul Hannan (born 1963), Bangladeshi four-star air officer
- Shaikh Yusuf Harun (born 1962), Bangladeshi government official
- Shaikh Zahuruddin Hatim (1699–??), Urdu poet
- Shaikh Imam-ud-Din (1819–1859), Punjabi Muslim noble in the Sikh Empire
- Shaikh Faridul Islam (born 1970), Bangladeshi politician
- Shaikh Hasan Jalayir (died 1374), Jalayirid ruler
- Shaikh Hussain Jalayir (died 1382), Jalayirid ruler
- Shaikh Jamiruddin (1870–1937), Bengali Islamic preacher and writer
- Shaikh Gadai Kamboh (died 1574), Punjabi Sufi saint
- Shaikh Inayat Allah Kamboh (1608–1671), Mughal scholar, writer, and historian
- Shaikh Sama'al-Din Kamboh, Punjabi Sufi saint
- Shaikh Muhammad Karakunnu (born 1950), Indian author and Islamic Scholar
- Shaikh Dawood Khan (1916–1992), Indian tabla player
- Shaikh Asiri Lahiji (died 1506), Persian poet, theologian, and Sufi mystic
- Shaikh Hamid Lodi, Indian monarch
- Shaikh Mahmoud (died 1327), governor during the Ilkhanate
- Shaikh Din Muhammad, Pakistani jurist and politician
- Shaikh Basheer Ahmed Muhyiddin (1937–2005), Islamic scholar, preacher, and author
- Shaikh Ghulam Muhy-ud-Din (died 1846), Muslim official of the Sikh Empire
- Shaikh Nasiruddin (1916–1991), Indian cricketer
- Shaikh Paltu (died 1857), British Indian sepoy
- Shaikh Habib Al-Raee, Sufi saint
- Shaikh Monzurul Haque Rahad (born 1984), Bangladeshi politician
- Shaikh Aasif Shaikh Rashid, Indian politician
- Shaikh Riazuddin (born 1971), Indian cricketer
- Shaikh Abdus Salam (born 1955), Bangladeshi academic, writer, sports organizer, and professor
- Shaikh Rehan Shahid, Pakistani politician

== Surname ==
- Anwar Shaikh (writer) (1928–2006), Pakistani-born British author
- Anwar Shaikh (economist) (1945–2026), Pakistani American economist
- Arbaj Shaikh, Indian actor
- Fatima Sana Shaikh (born 1992), Indian actress
- Jibran Shaikh, fictional character in the 2023 Indian film Tiger 3

== Communities ==
- Shaikhs in South Asia, a social and ethnic grouping in South Asia
- Kashmiri Shaikhs, a large Kashmiri clan
- Gujarati Shaikh, a Muslim community found in the state of Gujarat
- Punjabi Shaikhs, a community found in Punjab consisting of Muslim converts from the Brahmin, Rajput, and Khatri castes
- Shaikhs of Uttar Pradesh
- Sindhi Shaikhs, a community found in Sindh consisting Muslim converts from the Lohana caste

== See also ==
- Cheikh (disambiguation)
- Shaik (disambiguation)
- Sheik (disambiguation)
- Sheikh (disambiguation)
