= Sheikh (disambiguation) =

Sheikh is an Arabic word meaning the elder of a tribe, a revered old man, or an Islamic scholar.

Sheikh, Shaikh, or Sheykh may also refer to:

== Communities ==
- Shaikhs in North India, a social and ethnic grouping in South Asia
- Kashmiri Shaikhs, a large Kashmiri clan
- Gujarati Shaikh, a Muslim community found in the state of Gujarat
- Punjabi Shaikhs, a community found in Punjab consisting of Muslim converts from the Brahmins, Rajputs, and Khatris castes
- Shaikhs of Uttar Pradesh
- Sindhi Shaikhs, a community found in Sindh consisting of Muslim converts from the Lohana caste
- Sheikhs of Bengal

== People with the family name ==
=== Families ===
- Al ash-Sheikh, Saudi Arabia's leading religious family
- Sheikh family of Tungipara, Bangladeshi political family

=== Individuals ===
- Aamina Sheikh (born 1981), Pakistani American actress
- Anwar Shaikh (critic of Islam) (1928–2006), Pakistani-born British author
- Anwar Shaikh (economist) (born 1945), Pakistani American economist
- Atif Sheikh (born 1991), English cricketer
- Jawed Sheikh (born 1954), Pakistani actor
- Khaled Sheikh, Yemeni diplomat
- Mohammed Sheikh (born 1973), English cricketer
- Saleem Sheikh (born 1967), Pakistani actor
- Shahnaz Sheikh, Pakistani hockey player
- Sheikh Abdullah (1905–1982), first Prime Minister of Jammu and Kashmir
- Simon Sheikh (born 1986), Australian community campaigner and economist

== Places ==
- Sheikh, Somaliland, a city in Sahil Province, Somaliland
- Sheykh, Golestan, a village in Iran
- Sheykh, Kurdistan, a village in Iran
- Sheykh, North Khorasan, a village in Iran
- Sheykh, West Azerbaijan, a village in Iran

== Other uses ==
- "Sheikh" (song), a 2020 song by Indian singer Karan Aujla
- Sheikh (Sufism), title for a Sufi leader
- Sheikh, a fictional character in the 2019 Indian animated series Chacha Chaudhary

== See also ==
- Al-Sheikh (surname)
- Cheikh (disambiguation)
- Shaik (disambiguation)
- Shaikh (disambiguation)
- Sheik (disambiguation)
- Sheikh Chilli (disambiguation)
