= Dihlawi (surname) =

Dihlawi (Dihlawī), also spelled Dehlawi, Dehlavi, Dehlvi and other variants, is a toponymic surname (nisba) for people from Delhi (i.e., transliteration of the Standard Urdu word Dihlī/Dehlī). Notable people with the surname include:

- 'Abd al-Haqq al-Dehlawi (1551–1642), Indian Islamic scholar from Delhi, author of Ma'arij-ul-Nabuwwah
- Abdul Rehman Jilani Dehlvi (1615–1677), Indian Sufi saint of the Qadri tariqa
- Ahmad Saeed Dehlavi (1888–1959), Indian Muslim scholar, writer and freedom fighter
- Ali Muhammad Khan Dehlavi (1875–c. 1946), Indian politician, educationist, Muslim reformer
- Bedil Dehlavi or Bedil Azimabadi or Abdul-Qādir Bēdil (1642–1720), Indian poet in Persian
- Bekhud Dehlvi (1863–1955), Indian Urdu poet and writer of ghazals
- Daagh Dehlvi (1831–1905), 19th-century Indian Urdu poet
- Faaiz Dehlvi (1609–1738), Indian noble and poet in Urdu and Persian
- Ghulam Ali Dehlavi (1743–1824), 19th-century Indian Sufi leader
- Gulzar Dehlvi (1926–2020), Indian Urdu poet
- Hafiz-ur-Rahman Wasif Dehlavi (1910–1987), Indian Muslim scholar, jurist and writer, and former rector of Madrasa Aminia
- Hossein Dehlavi (1927–2019), Iranian composer, ancestors settled in Delhi
- Houman Dehlavi (born 1971), Iranian musician
- Jamil Dehlavi (born 1944), British-Pakistani filmmaker, brother of Saidulla Khan Dehlavi
- Khalish Dehlavi (born 1935), Indian Urdu poet
- Kifayatullah Dehlawi (1875–1952), Islamic scholar and Grand Mufti of India
- Maulana Abdu Salam Niazi Dehlvi (–1966), Indian perfumer and Sufi scholar
- Mir Hasan Dehlavi (1736–1786), 18th-century Indian Urdu poet
- Mirza Muhammad Kamil Dehlavi (–1819/20), Indian Shiite author
- Mumtaz Jehan Begum Dehlavi or Madhubala (1933–1969), noted Indian film actress
- Nasiruddin Chiragh Dehlavi (1274–1337), 13th-century Indian Sufi saint
- Nazir Ahmad Dehlvi (1836–1912), Indian educationist, reformer and Urdu writer, best known for the social novel Mirat-ul-Uroos
- Sadia Dehlvi (1957–2020), Indian writer and columnist from Delhi
- Sadruddin Khan Azurda Dehlawi (1804–1868), Grand Mufti of Delhi, leader of the Indian Rebellion of 1857
- Saidulla Khan Dehlavi (1941–2014), Pakistani diplomat, brother of Jamil Dehlavi
- Shah Abdul Aziz Dehlavi (1746–1824), Indian Islamic scholar, reformer and Naqshbandi Sufi, son of Shah Waliullah Dehlawi
- Shah Abdur Rahim Dehlavi (1644–1719), Islamic scholar and a writer, compiler of Fatawa-e-'Alamgiri, father of Shah Waliullah Dehlawi
- Shah Ismail Dehlvi (1779–1831), Indian Islamic scholar and Sufi
- Shah Muhammad Ishaq Dehlawi (1783–1846), Indian Muslim scholar of hadith studies
- Shah Waliullah Dehlawi (1703–1762), Indian Islamic reformer, father of Shah Abdul Aziz Dehlavi, who brought Wahhabism into the Indian subcontinent
- Shahid Ahmad Dehlvi (1906–1967), Pakistani author and translator, grandson of Nazir Ahmad Dehlvi
- Soz Dehlvi (1720–1799), Indian Urdu poet in the court of Awadh
- Syed Ahmad Dehlvi (1846–1918), Indian Muslim scholar, educationist and linguist, editor of the Urdu dictionary Farhang-e-Asifiya
- Syed Nazeer Husain Dehlavi (1805–1902), Indian Muslim scholar of the reformist Ahl-i Hadith movement
- Syed Muhammad Dehlavi, Pakistani Shiite scholar
- Tabish Dehlvi (1913–2004), Pakistani writer
- Zakaullah Dehlvi (1832–1910), Indian scholar and historian, writer of the Urdu chronicle Tarikh-e-Hindustan

== See also ==
- Dehlavi dialect
- Delhi (disambiguation)
- List of people from Delhi
