= Cheikh (disambiguation) =

Cheikh is an African masculine given name. It is an alternate spelling of Sheikh, an Arab leader. Notable people with the name include:

== People with the given name ==
- Cheikh Ag Aoussa (1965/66–2016), Malian rebel leader and drug trafficker
- Cheikh el-Arab (1924–1964), Moroccan independence activist
- Cheikh Sidy Ba (born 1968), Senegalese footballer
- Cheikh Ahmed Baye (born 1954), Mauritanian politician
- Cheikh Bentounès (born 1949), Algerian Sufi master
- Cheikh Bouamama (1841–1908), Algerian rebel
- Cheikh Boumerdassi (1818–1874), Algerian resistance leader
- Cheikh Tidiane Boye (born 1961), Senegalese middle-distance runner
- Cheikh Abdoul Khadre Cissokho (born 1936), Senegalese agricultural engineer and politician
- Cheikh Yaya Dia (born 1974), Senegalese basketball player
- Cheikh Diamanka (born 2001), Senegalese footballer
- Cheikh-Alan Diarra (born 1993), French footballer
- Cheikh Diba (born 1978), Senegalese politician
- Cheikh Bamba Dièye (born 1965), Senegalese politician
- Cheikh Anta Diop (1923–1986), Senegalese historian and anthropologist
- Cheikh Mbacké Diop (born 2005), Senegalese footballer
- Cheikh Tidiane Diouf (born 1995), Senegalese sprinter
- Cheikh Touradou Diouf (born 1956), Senegalese sprinter
- Cheikh Fall (footballer, born 2004) (born 2004), Senegalese footballer
- Cheikh Amadou Fall (1946–2008), Senegalese basketball player
- Cheikh Sadibou Fall (1950–2020), Senegalese politician
- Cheikh Gadiaga (born 1979), Senegalese footballer
- Cheikh Tidiane Gadio (born 1956), Senegalese politician and diplomat
- Cheikh Tidiane Gaye (born 1971), Senegalese-Italian writer, essayist, poet, and peace activist
- Cheikh Gueye (born 1986), Senegalese footballer
- Cheikh El Haddad (1790–1873), Algerian resistance leader
- Cheikh Hamidi (born 1983), Algerian footballer
- Cheikh El Hasnaoui (1910–2002), Algerian singer
- Cheikh Hamidou Kane (1928–2026), Senegalese writer
- Cheikh El Avia Ould Mohamed Khouna (born 1956), Mauritanian politician
- Cheikh Lô (born 1955), Senegalese musician
- Cheikh Hamidou Kane Mathiara (1939–2009), Senegalese politician and economist
- Cheikh Mbacke, Senegalese statistician
- Cheikh M'Baye (born 1995), Senegalese footballer
- Cheikh M'Bengue (born 1988), French-Senegalese footballer
- Cheikh Mbodj (born 1987), Senegalese basketball player
- Cheikh Mokrani (1815–1871), Algerian rebel leader
- Cheikh Mwijo (1937–2020), Moroccan musician and songwriter
- Cheikh N'Diaye (born 1985), Senegalese football coach and player
- Cheikh N'Doye (born 1986), Senegalese footballer
- Cheikh Niang (born 1957), Senegalese diplomat and politician
- Cheikh Niasse (born 2000), Senegalese footballer
- Cheikh Raymond (1912–1961), Algerian musician
- Cheikh Sabaly (born 1999), Senegalese footballer
- Cheikh Samb (born 1984), Senegalese basketball center
- Cheikh Sane (born 1992), Senegalese basketball player
- Cheikh Sarr (died 2004), Senegalese-Italian lifeguard
- Cheikh Sarr (basketball) (born 1968), Senegalese basketball coach
- Cheikh Tidiane Sarr (born 1987), Danish footballer
- Cheikh Seck (born 1958), Senegalese footballer
- Cheikh Sidibé (born 1999), Senegalese football defender
- Cheikh Hadjibou Soumaré (born 1951), Senegalese politician
- Cheikh Tidiane Sy (born 1938), Senegalese politician
- Cheikh Taylor (born 1973), American politician
- Cheikh Tiberghien (born 2000), French rugby union player
- Cheikh Touré (born 1970), Senegalese long jumper

== See also ==
- Cheikh Taba, a town in the Akkar District, Lebanon
- Shaik (disambiguation)
- Shaikh (disambiguation)
- Sheik (disambiguation)
- Sheikh (disambiguation)
