= Behlim =

Total population
- 7400

Regions with significant populations
- India; Pakistan

Languages
- Urdu; Hindi; Gujarati

Religion
- Islam

Related ethnic groups
- Shaikh; Shaikh of Uttar Pradesh; Gori; Shaikh of Gujarat; Nagar Muslims

The Behlim are a Muslim community found mainly in North India. A small number are also found in the city of Karachi in Pakistan.

During the 1947 partition of India, some members of the Behlim community migrated from the border regions of Fazilka and other districts of Punjab and Haryana to South Punjab in Pakistan, mainly settling in areas such as Fort Abbas and Hasilpur.

== Origin ==
The Behlim trace their descent the Sufi Masud Ghazi, and the word is said to be a corruption of the word ba-ilm, meaning those who are knowledgeable in Arabic. There are in fact two distinct communities of Behlim, those of Gujarat, who are found mainly in Mehsana and Banaskantha districts, while those of Uttar Pradesh, who are found mainly in the Doab region of that state.

== Present circumstances ==
The Behlim are an agrarian community, found mostly in north Gujarat. According to some traditions, they were once Rajputs, and their customs are similar to other Muslim Rajput communities, such as the Maliks. The Behlim intermarry with other Gujarati Muslim communities of similar status such as Pathan, Shaikh and Molesalam Rajputs. Unlike other Gujarati Muslims, they have no caste association, and generally are allied to other Rajput landholding classes. They speak Gujarati , Teli in south Punjab and are Sunni Muslims. Some Behlim are also found in Rahim Yar Khan District and Ghotki District.
