= Qanungoh Shaikh =

Muslim clan in parts of Pakistan and Afghanistan

Qanungoh Shaikhs (also spelled Qanungo, Kanungoh, Kanungo etc.) are a clan of Muslim Shaikhs mainly in Punjab and other parts of Pakistan. The Qanungoh were the employees of the court and judicial systems in South Asia during the period of Muslim rule; the title Qanungoh literally referring to an "expounder of law" or the Qanun. These included judges; qazi who were styled sahib or sahibzada, lawyers and a wide variety of other legal functionaries, who would form the principal officers in district or regional courts of investigation, in criminal matters and in offences of a "spiritual nature". On a state level Qanungoh Shaikhs were hereditary government agents and “permanent repositories of information concerning the revenue receipts, area statistics, local revenue rates and (the) practice and customs” of local areas and municipalities, across the various empires that existed in the subcontinent. As land administrators they maintained a monopoly in the possession of esoteric and often ancient information and in this context, were considered at best the “refuge of the husbandmen” and at worst; corrupt high officers of empire who manipulated records to their remunerative advantage. Qanungoh Shaikhs today are the descendants of families who held the hereditary office of ‘’Qanungoh’’ during the Muslim period.

The Qanungoh have tribal and marital affinities with varied regional groups such as the Kukhran, Muslim Rajputs, Muslim Kayasths, Mohyal Brahmins, Awan, and Khattar as well as Rohillas, Rind and Gardezi and also Kakkezai in the Jullunder area. Some people known as Shiekhkhel are also said to have been the Qanungoh in North Waziristan. A small number of Qanungoh Shaikh also live in India and Bangladesh.

Qanungoh Shaikhs belong to all the districts of the Punjab as well as some districts in the Sarhad and Balochistan provinces, although can be found in small numbers in Paktika and Khost provinces in Afghanistan where they are sometimes referred to as Hindki. A minority of Qanungoh Shaikhs adhere to the Shia Islam whilst others originating in lower Punjab and Baluchistan are Sunni and may belong to various Sufi orders. Some Qanungo Shaikhs have also been known to be of the Zikri denomination.

Qanungoh Shaikhs even today remain influential and amongst most literate elements of Pakistani society. Many well-known political figures and other great academics have arisen from the Qanungo Shaikhs, examples being Sessions Judge Khan Bahadur Maulvi Imam Ali, Justice Chaudhry Muhammad Sharif, the former President of Pakistan Wasim Sajjad, the lawyer and jurist Sir Abdul Qadir, his son Manzoor Qadir who drafted the first constitution of Pakistan, Sheikh Anwarul Haq and also Shaikh Aftab Ahmed, the former Federal Minister for Parliamentary Affairs and MNA from Attock, amongst many others.

Today certain administrative areas in Pakistan retain the name of Qanungoh Halqas based on the jurisdiction of the regional Qanungoh and although the title does not officially exist in its previous contexts, it is still nevertheless sometimes used to refer to regional revenue officers, in certain circumstances.

== Origins ==
Qanungoh Shaikhs are the descendants of the Muslim Qanungohs of what is now Pakistan who are styled Shaikh and often retain their tribal or familial names.

The title of Qanungoh appeared in the Sub-Continent between 1270 and 1290 owing to migrations of the minor Arab aristocracy prompted by Hulegu Khan's destruction of the Abbasid Caliphate in Baghdad. The hereditary office of the Qanungoh was well established and instituted during the Khalji dynasty. The loose suzerainty of the Mamluk Caliphs over the Khaljis served as a further conduit for the movement of literate people from Central Asia and the Middle East to the Delhi Sultanate to serve as administration over the local populace.

Their office continued and was greatly extended under the Mughals. For the purposes of Qanungoh Shaikhs, the northern expansion of the Mughal empire particularly under Akbar resulted in people representing largely Sheikh Khatri and other Punjabi tribes as well as some Baluch and Pakhtoon tribes acquiring the title of Qanungoh. This was a golden age for the Qanungoh and these groups through marital and political affiliation collectively instituted and integrated the Qanungoh Shaikhs as a powerful and wealthy clan. From the early 15th century onwards a small number of Sikhs also joined the Qanungoh, the descendants of whom became the Rulers of Kangra.

During the British period the Qanungoh continued in their hereditary office although their importance declined particularly following the Indian Mutiny. As their influence waned during this period they were popularly portrayed as corrupt, debauched and tyrannical.

== See also ==
- Shaikhs in South Asia
- Khatri
- Muslim Kayasths
- Muslim Khatris
- Punjabi Shaikh
