= Nagar Muslims =

Muslim community of Uttar Pradesh, India

The Nagar Muslims are a Muslim community found in the state of Uttar Pradesh in India. They are Muslim converts from the larger Nagar Brahmin community. The Nagar are also known as Nagar Shaikh.

== Origin ==
The Ahar pargana of Bulandshahr District was held by the Nagar and Nagar artisans prior to the Muslim conquest of the region in the 11th century. During the invasion of Muhammad Ghori the great, many of them along with their ruler from the Baranwal community converted to Islam in a deal to prevent further bloodshed and to save the remaining community. During those times, there was a common practice in which part of the community would convert to Islam and the invader would grant clemency to the remainder of the community. The Barnwal converts were called Barani and the Nagar converts were called Nagar Muslims. Even today, many prominent Muslims from Western Uttar Pradesh belong to these communities. As the Nagar played a key role in the 1857 War of Independence, most of their estates were confiscated. They were led by Sohrab Khan, who set himself up as the independent ruler, taking advantage of the collapse of British authority.

== Present circumstances ==
The Nagar are largely endogamous, although there have been a few cases of intermarriage with the Behlim Shaikh of Bulandshahr city, a community of similar status. There remains a marked preference to marry close kin, and they practice both cross cousin and parallel cousin marriages. The Nagar are Sunni Muslims, and largely Barelvi. Their customs are similar to other Shaikh communities in the Doab region. The Nagar generally speak standard Urdu.

== See also ==
- Shaikh of Uttar Pradesh
