= Sheikh =

Arabic and Islamic honorific title

Sheikh (Also spelled as Shaikh /ʃeɪk, ʃiːk/ SHAYK, SHEEK, Arabic: شَيْخ, romanized: shaykh [ʃajx], commonly [ʃeːx], plural: شُيُوخ, shuyūkh [ʃujuːx]) (Note: Also romanized sheekh, sheyikh, shaykh, shayk, shekh, shaik, shaikh, and cheique) is an honorific title in the Arabic language, literally meaning "elder". It commonly designates a tribal chief or a Muslim scholar.

In some countries, it is given as a surname to those of great knowledge in religious affairs, by a prestigious religious leader from a chain of Sufi scholars. The word is mentioned in the Qur'an in three places: verse 72 of Hud, 78 of Yusuf, and 23 of al-Qasas.

Royal family members of the United Arab Emirates and some other Arab countries also have this title, since the ruler of each emirate is also the sheikh of their tribe.

== Etymology and meaning ==
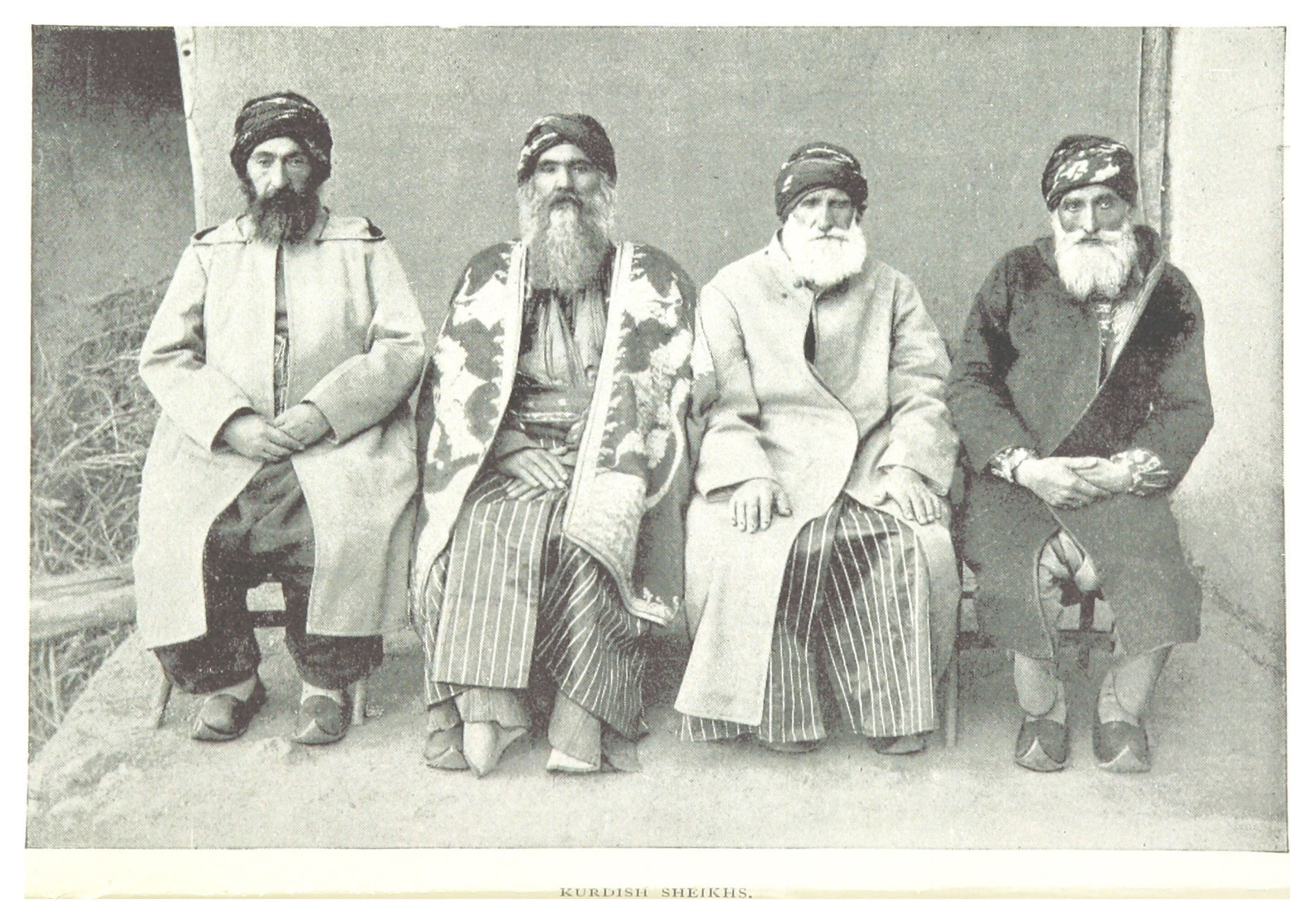
Kurdish sheikhs, 1895

The word in Arabic stems from a triliteral root connected with aging: ش-ي-خ, shīn-yā'-khā'. The title carries the meaning leader, elder, or noble, especially in the Arabian Peninsula within the Tribes of Arabia, where Shaikh became a traditional title of a Bedouin tribal leader in recent centuries. Due to the cultural impact of Arab civilization, and especially through the spread of Islam, the word has gained currency as a religious term or general honorific in many other parts of the world as well, notably in Muslim cultures in Africa and Asia.

== Sufi term ==
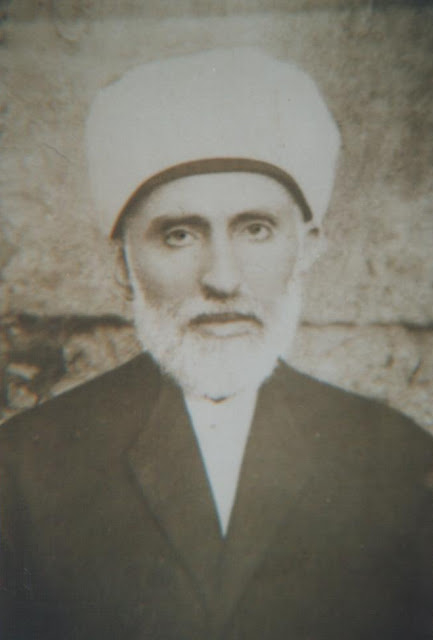
Mustafa Sabri Effendi, the second last Shaykh al-Islām (ultimate authority on religious affairs) of the Ottoman Empire and Caliphate, 1919-1920

In Sufism (tasawwuf), the word “shaikh” is used to represent a spiritual guide (murshid) who initiates a particular order (tariqa) which leads to Prophet Muhammad. Many saints can also have this title added before their names out of respect from their followers. A couple of prominent examples are Sheikh Abdul Qadir Jilani, who initiated the Qadiriyya order, and Sheikh Ahmad al-Tijani, who initiated the Tijaniyyah Sufi order.

== Regional usage ==
=== Arabian Peninsula ===
In the Arabian Peninsula, the title is used for chiefs of tribes. This also includes royalty in most of Eastern Arabia, where the royal families were traditionally considered tribal chiefs. For example, it is used by the UAE Al-Nahyan dynasty and Al Maktoum dynasty, who are considered the chiefs of the Bani Yas tribe; and by Sharjah's and Ras Al Khaimah's Al Qassimi dynasty who head the Quwasim confederation; as well Kuwait's Al Sabah dynasty and Bahrain's Al Khalifa dynasty of the Bani Utbah tribal confederation. The term is used by almost every male and female (Sheikha) member of the royal houses of the UAE, Bahrain, Qatar, and Kuwait. The title is not used by members of Al Saud of Saudi Arabia, where the title "Prince" (Arabic: أمير, romanized: ʾAmīr) is used instead.

The title is also used to refer to religious leaders for both Sunni and Shia Muslims. For example, the Saudi Arabian family Al ash-Sheikh (literally House of the Sheikh) is named after the religious leader and eponymous founder of Wahhabism, Muhammad ibn Abd al-Wahhab.

=== Lebanon ===
In Lebanon, the title had the same princely and royal connotation as in the Arabian peninsula until the Ottoman invasion in 1516, since it represented an indigenous autonomous "sui iuris" ruler or tribal chief. Examples of some ancient families that hold the title of "sui iuris" sheikh is the Al-Chemor family, ruling since 1211 CE in Koura and Zgharta until 1747 CE and the Boudib family (descendants of the Hashemite family) who were Ehdenian rulers of Jebbeh since 1471 CE until 1759 CE. The descendants of this sovereign family now live in Miziara, Mexico and Nigeria. Even the Abu Harmoush family heads, which ruled the Chouf region until the Battle of Ain Dara in 1711 CE, were "sui iuris" sheikhs. After the Ottoman rule and the implementation of the Iltizam system, the title gained a noble instead of royal connotation, since it was bestowed by a higher authority; in this case the Ottoman appointed Emir, who was nothing more than a mültezim or tax collector for the empire. Some very influential Maronite families, who had the title bestowed upon them, are (in chronological order): the El Hachem of Akoura (descendants of the Hashemite family, since 1523), the El-Khazen (since 1545), the Hubaysh of Kisrawan and the Douaihy of Zgharta. Other families who are nowadays addressed or known as "sheikhs" were not traditionally rulers of provinces, but instead they were high-ranking officials at the service of the Emir at that time.

=== Maghreb ===
In the Maghreb, during the Almohad dynasty, the caliph was also counseled by a body of sheikhs. They represented all the different tribes under their rules, including Arabs, (Bedouins), Andalusians and Berbers and were also responsible for mobilizing their kinsmen in the event of war.

=== Horn of Africa ===
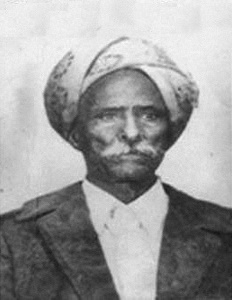
Sheikh Ali Ayanle Samatar, a prominent Somali Islamic scholar.

In the Muslim parts of the Horn of Africa, "shaikh" is often used as a noble title. In Somali society, it is reserved as an honorific for senior Muslim leaders and clerics (wadaad), and is often abbreviated to "Sh". Famous local sheikhs include Ishaaq bin Ahmed, an early Muslim scholar and Islamic preacher, Abdirahman bin Isma'il al-Jabarti, an early Muslim leader in Somaliland; Abadir Umar Ar-Rida, the patron saint of Harar; Abd al-Rahman al-Jabarti, Sheikh of the riwaq in Cairo who recorded the Napoleonic invasion of Egypt; Abd Al-Rahman bin Ahmad al-Zayla'i, scholar who played a crucial role in the spread of the Qadiriyyah movement in Somalia and East Africa; Sheikh Sufi, 19th century scholar, poet, reformist and astrologist; Abdallah al-Qutbi, polemicist, theologian and philosopher best known for his five-part Al-Majmu'at al-mubaraka ("The Blessed Collection"); and Muhammad Al-Sumaalee, teacher in the Masjid al-Haram in Mecca who influenced many of the prominent Islamic scholars of today.

=== South Asia ===
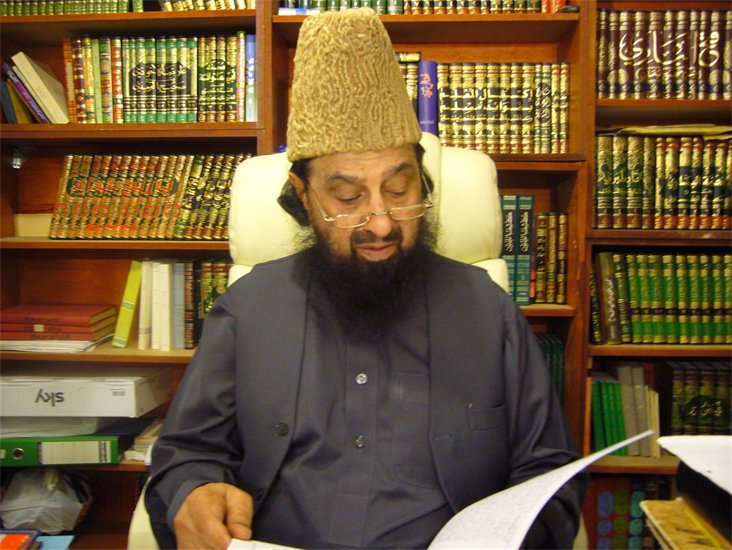
Pakistani Sheikh Syed Abdul Qadir Jilani, a prominent Sunni scholar

In the cosmopolitan hub of the South Asian sub-continent, it is not just an ethnic title but also often an occupational title attributed to Muslim trading families. After the advent of Islam in South Asia, many Hindu-Buddhists clans from different castes converted to Islam and adopted the title. In the Punjab region, Ismaili Pirs gave some converts, as well as Muslims who emigrated from Central Asia, especially after the Mongol conquests, the hereditary title of Ismaili Shaikhs.

=== Southeast Asia ===
In Indonesia and other parts of Southeast Asia, sheikhs are respected by local Muslims. In Indonesia, the term is usually spelled "syech", and this is usually attributed to elderly ulama. Higher knowledgeable people of Islamic studies in Indonesia are usually referred to as "ustad" or "kyai".

=== Iran ===
From the perspective of Iran, the word or title of sheikh possesses diverse meanings, among individuals who are aged and wise, it has been an honorific title used for elders and learned scholars, such as: Sheikh al-Rayees Abu Ali Sina, Sheikh Mufid, Sheikh Morteza Ansari. People who are proven to be descendants of the Prophet Muhammad are called Sayyid/Seyyed instead of sheikh.

== For women ==
Historically, female scholars in Islam were referred to as Sheikha or Shaykhah (Arabic: شيخة) (alt. shaykhat). Notable shaykha include the 10th-century Shaykhah Fakhr-un-Nisa Shuhdah and 18th-century scholar Al-Shaykha Fatima al-Fudayliyya. In 1957, Indonesian education activist Rahmah el Yunusiyah was awarded the title of syeikah by the faculty of Al-Azhar University, the first time the university had granted the title to a woman.

A daughter, wife or mother of a sheikh is also called a shaykhah. Currently, the term shaykhah is commonly used for women of ruling families in the Arab states of the Arabian Peninsula.

== See also ==
- Sheikh (Sufism)
- Allamah
- Al ash-Sheikh
- Ayatollah
- Īshān
- Kashmiri Shaikh
- List of maraji
- List of ayatollahs
- Manihar
- Seghatoleslam
- Punjabi Shaikh
- Qallu
- Qanungoh Shaikh
- Shaykh al-Islām
- Shaykhism
- Sindhi Shaikh
- Shekhani dialect
- Sheikhs of Bengal
- Cheikh (disambiguation)
- Shaik (disambiguation)
- Shaikh (disambiguation)
- Sheik (disambiguation)
- Sheikh (disambiguation)
