= Groom (profession) =

Horse and/or stable manager

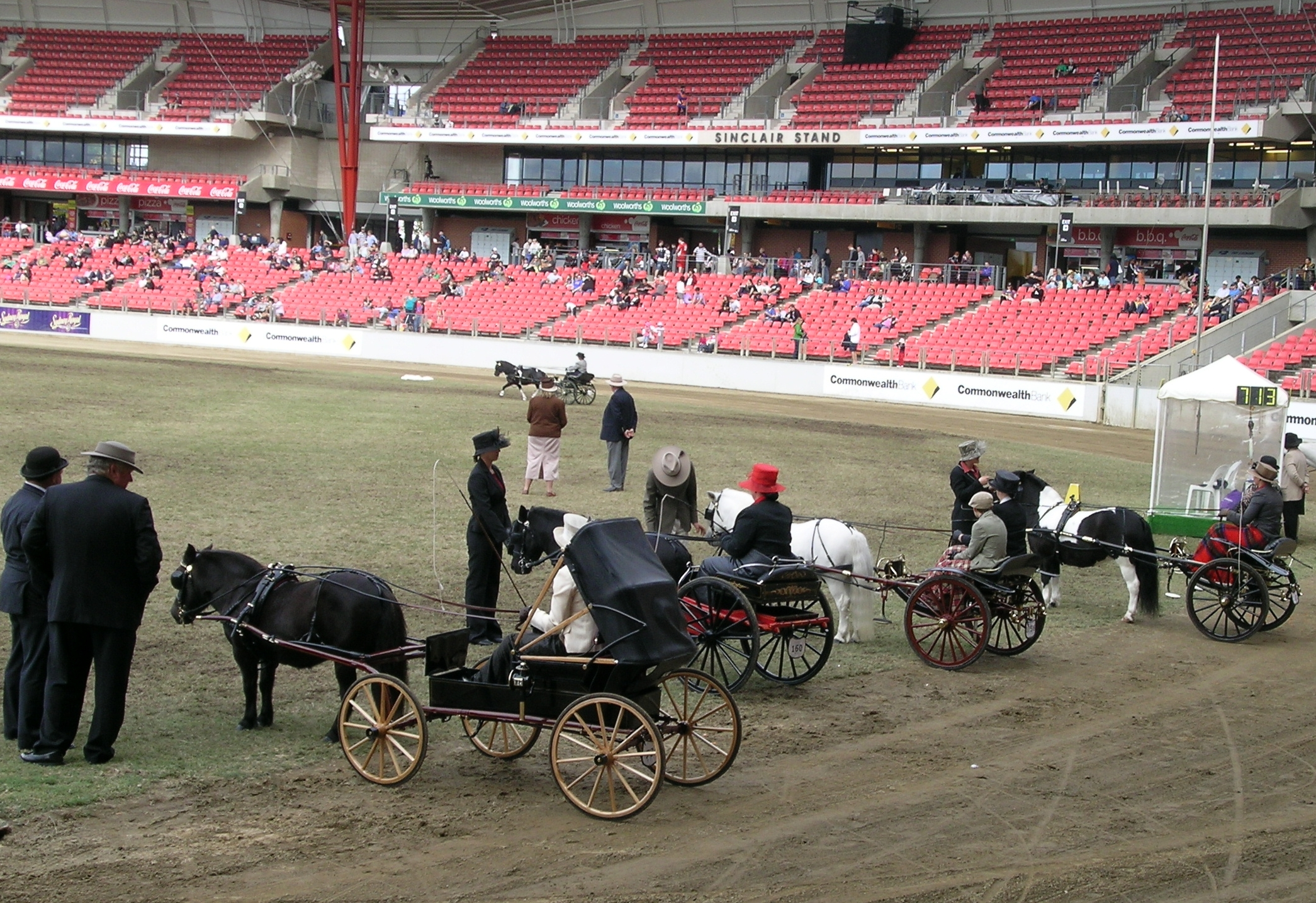
Shetland ponies with their drivers and formally dressed grooms in attendance.

A groom or stable boy (stable hand, stable lad) is a person who is responsible for some or all aspects of the management of horses and/or the care of the stables themselves. The term most often refers to a person who is the employee of a stable owner, but an owner of a horse may perform the duties of a groom, particularly if the owner possesses only a few horses.

== Etymology ==
The word appeared in English as grome c.1225, meaning "boy child, boy, youth". Its origin is unknown; it has no known cognates in other Germanic languages (e.g. Dutch and German use compound terms, such as Stal(l)knecht 'stable servant', or equivalents of synonyms mentioned below). Perhaps, it stems from an Old English root groma, related to growan "grow" or from Old French grommet "servant" (compare Medieval English gromet for "ship's boy", recorded since 1229).

The word was originally rather grander in status, as in bridegroom and the socially-elevated offices in the English Royal Household of:

- Groom of the Chamber, or of the Privy Chamber
- Groom of the Robes
- Groom of the Stool

The meaning "man servant who attends to horses" is from 1667 although women and girls are often grooms. The verb is first attested in 1809; the transferred sense of "to tidy (oneself) up" is from 1843; and the figurative sense of "to prepare a candidate" is from 1887, originally in U.S. politics.

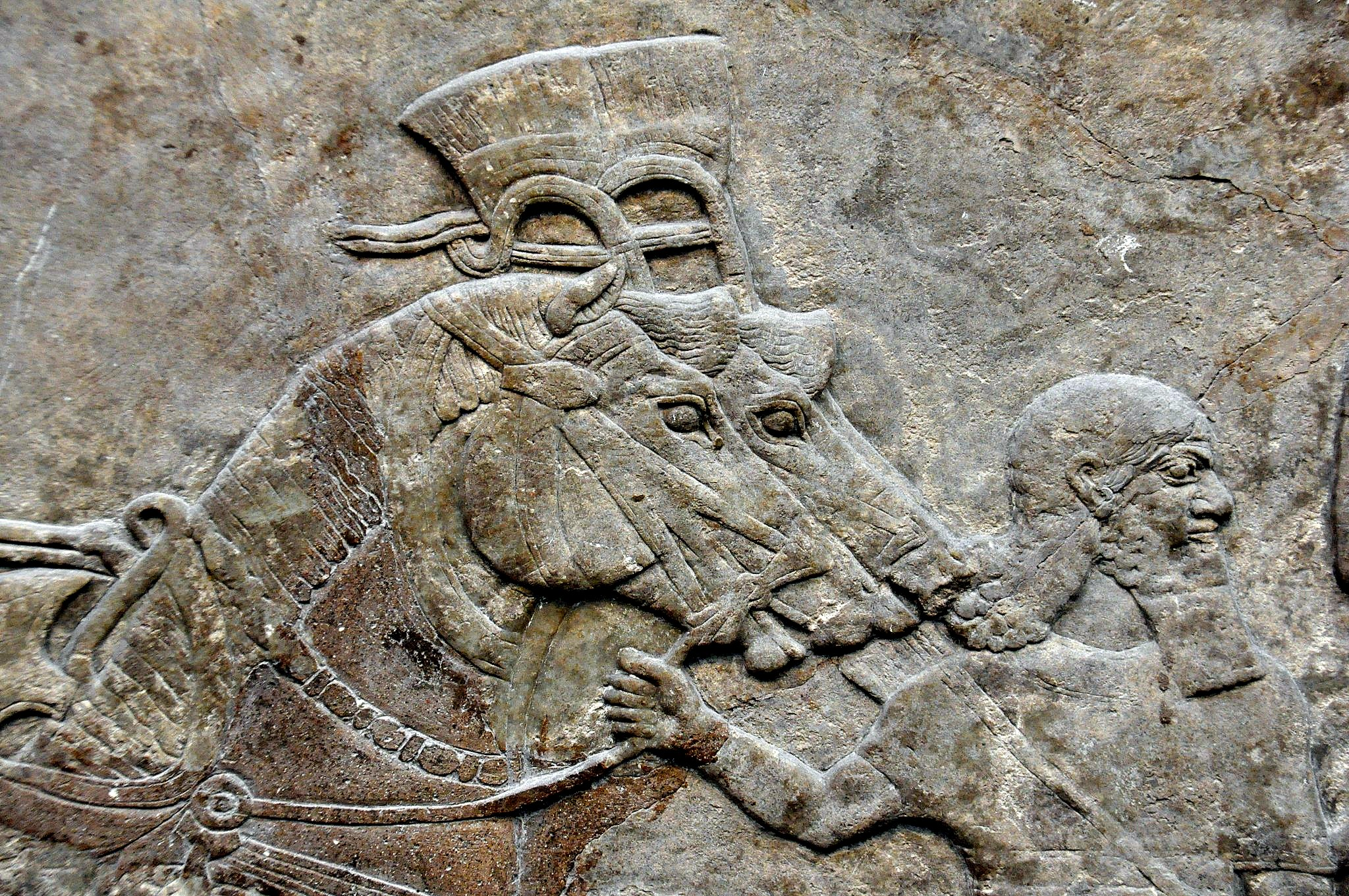
Assyrian grooms and horses, from Nimrud, Iraq. The British Museum.

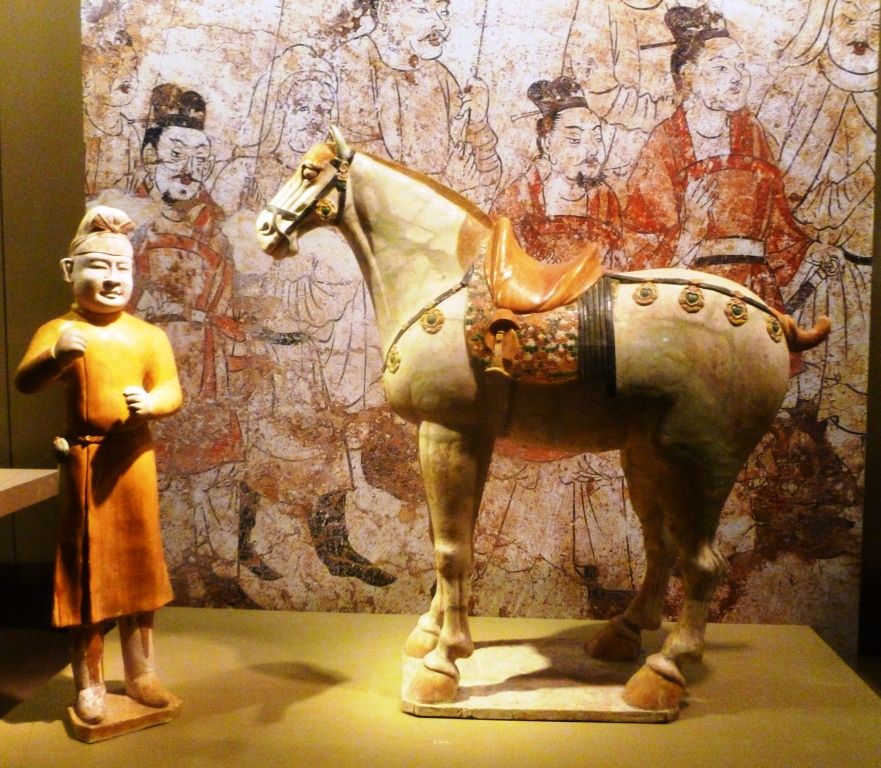
Tri-coloured pottery horse and groom. Tang dynasty 618-907 CE. Shaanxi History Museum, Xi'an, China.

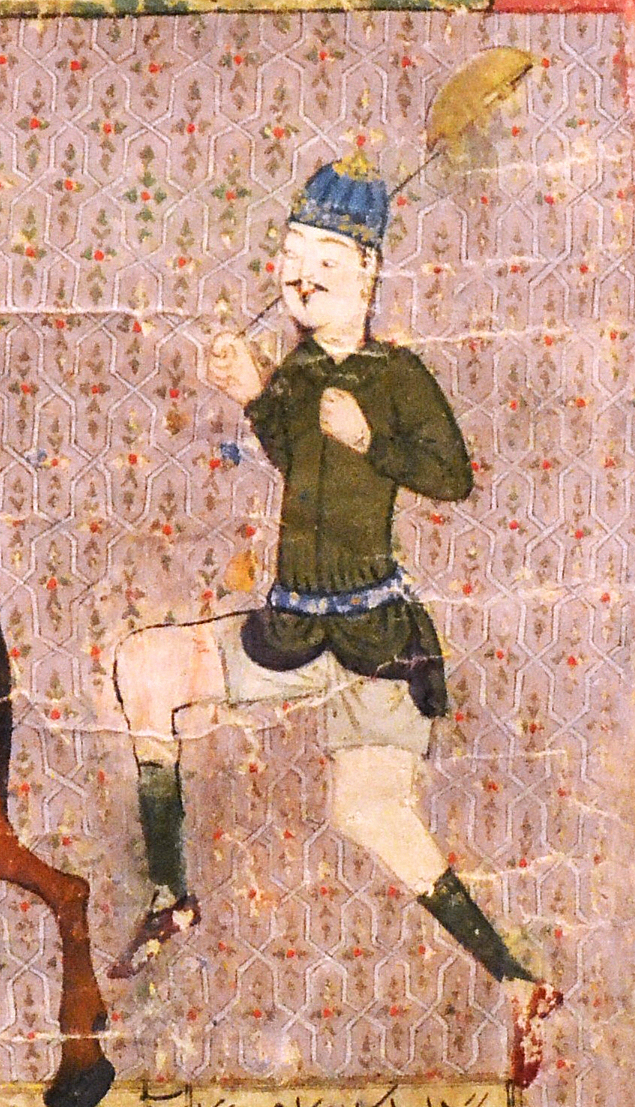
A payk groom in the Timurid Zafarnama of 1436.

== Job ==
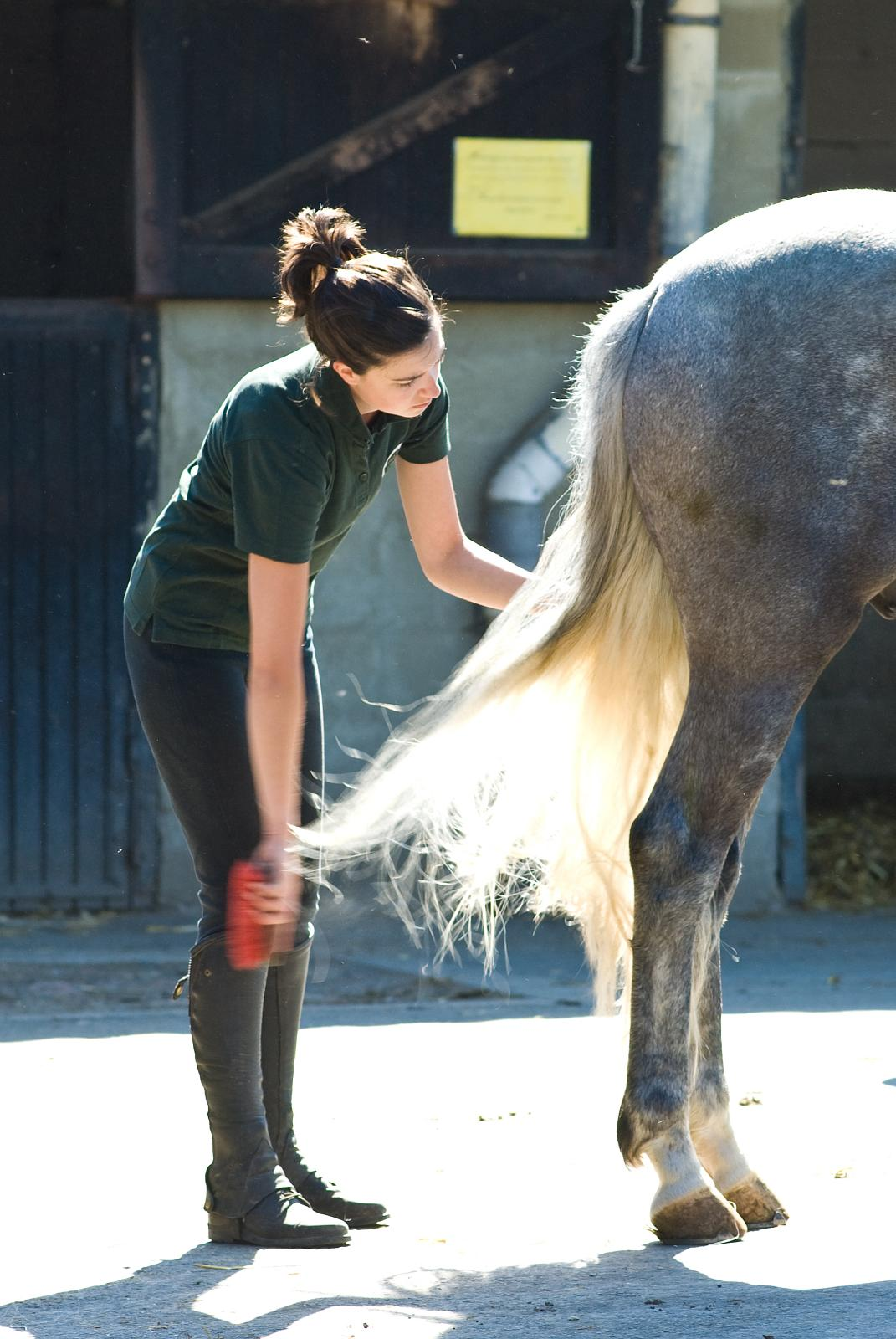
A woman grooming a horse's tail.

Grooms may be employed in private residences or in professional horse training facilities such as stables, agistment properties and riding academies.

The groom(s) usually clean stables (mucking-out), feed, exercise and groom horses.

A groom in private service is expected to be 'on call' during specified hours in case any member of the employer's family wishes to ride.

Grooms whose employers are involved in horse sports or horse racing are often required to travel with their employers to provide support services during competitions. The services required vary with the type of competition and range from simply ensuring that the horse is ready for the start of the competition to warming the horse up beforehand.

In competition, the term may have a distinct meaning. At a horse show, grooms outside of the ring perform standard grooming tasks, but if utilized inside the show ring are generally defined as an individual called in to assist an exhibitor with a horse while in competition. In combined driving the groom is the passenger and at speed is required to shift their weight to balance the carriage.

== Ranks, synonyms and terminology ==
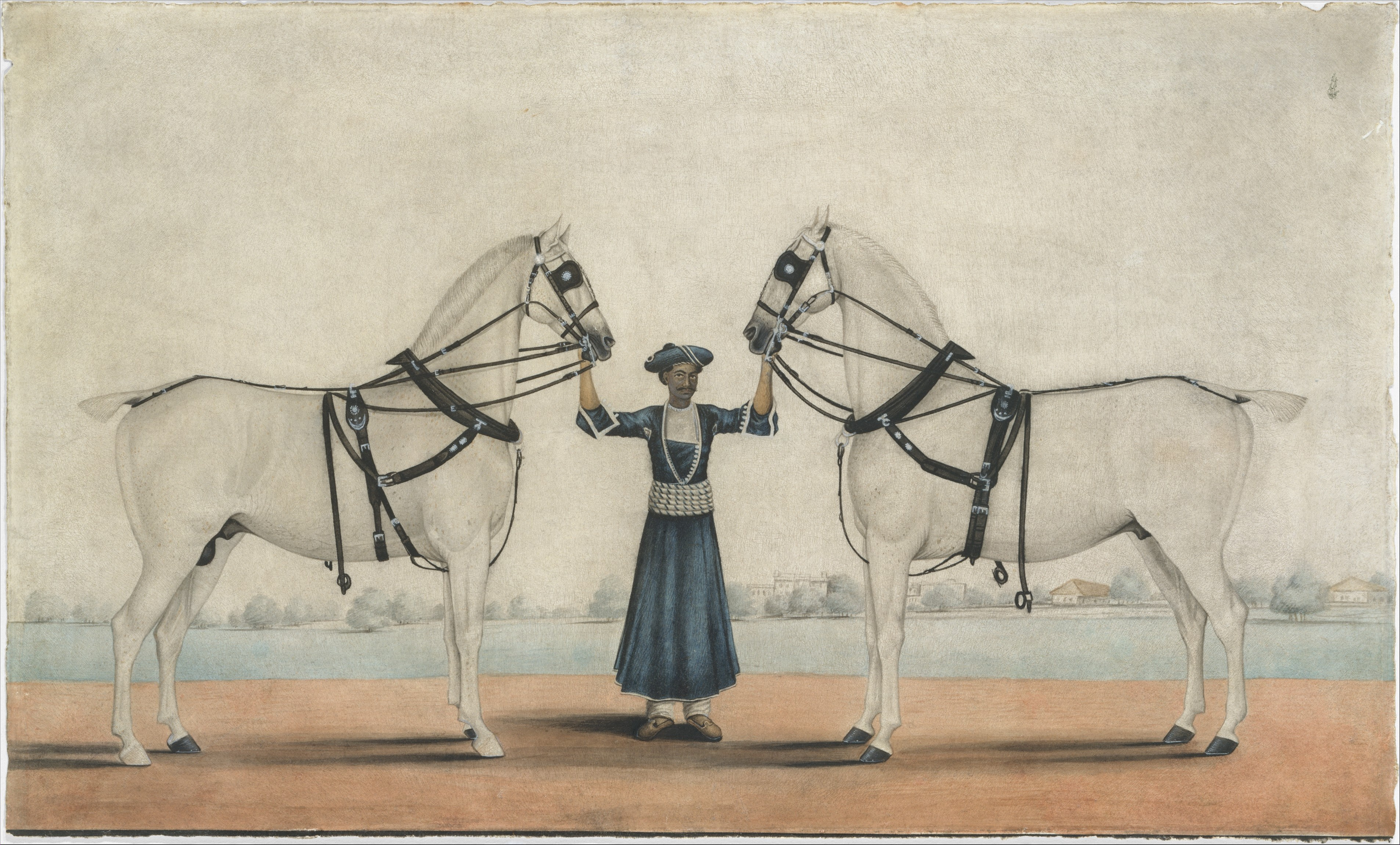
A painting by Shaikh Muhammad Amir of Karraya displaying a Bengali syce holding two carriage horses.

Stablehand is a more old-fashioned term; the variation stableman usually applies to an experienced adult, the lowest rank stableboy (corresponding to the first origin of groom) rather to a minor and/or trainee.

The historical synonym [h]ostler has meanwhile developed (in the United States) a new meaning of "rail employee".

Large establishments may employ several grooms under the management of the head groom or stablemaster. In many cases the head groom has complete responsibility for the horses including devising training schedules, choosing feeds for optimum nutrition and ensuring the horses are shod, wormed, inoculated and provided with timely veterinary care.

Several other words originally denoting other (often much higher) titles, notably Constable, Equerry and Marshal, have developed into terms for those working with horses.

In African or Asian contexts, English-speakers sometimes use the Arabic/Hindustani word sais or syce instead of "groom".

== See also ==
- Farrier
- Hostler
- Strapper
