= Shaik =

Shaik is an alternate spelling of Sheikh, an Arabic honorific title.

Shaik may also refer to:

== People with the surname ==
- Fatima Shaik (born 1952), American writer
- Schabir Shaik (born c. 1956), South African businessman convicted for corruption and fraud
- Moe Shaik (born 1959), South African civil servant
- Nowhera Shaik (born 1973), Indian businesswoman and politician
- Shanina Shaik (born 1991), Arab Australian model
- Jafreen Shaik (born 1997), Indian tennis player

== People with the given name ==
- Shaik Subrathie, South African politician
- Shaik Salauddin (born 1985), Indian trade unionist
- Shaik Basha (born 1993), Indian cricketer
- Shaik Ismail (born 2002), Indian cricketer
- Shaik Rasheed (born 2004), Indian cricketer

== See also ==
- Chiuli Shaik, Arizona
- Cheikh (disambiguation)
- Shaikh (disambiguation)
- Sheik (disambiguation)
- Sheikh (disambiguation)
- Shake (disambiguation)
