= Mujavir =

Muslim community of Uttar Pradesh, India

The Mujavir are a Muslim community in the state of Uttar Pradesh in India. They are also known as Shaikh Hashemi and Sheikh Masudi.

== See also ==
- Shaikh of Uttar Pradesh
