= Punjabi Saudagaran-e-Delhi =

Qaume-e-Punjaban Shamsi
Regions with significant populations
- Pakistan; India; Saudi Arabia

Languages
- Urdu; English; Persian; Arabic; Punjabi

Religion
- Islam

Related ethnic groups
- Punjabi Shaikh, other Punjabis

The Punjabi Saudagaran-e-Delhi, (Note: Punjabi and Urdu: پنجابی سوداگران دہلی, romanized: Pañjābī Saudāgarān-i Dihlī) sometimes referred to as the Qaum-e-Punjabian, (Note: Punjabi and Urdu: قوم پنجابیان, romanized: Qaum-i Pañjābiyān) Dehlavi, or simply Shamsi Biradari is a community of Punjabi Muslims in Delhi. Basically, they are a merchant community that historically came from Sargodha and Chiniot districts in West Punjab and settled mainly in Shahjahanabad, Delhi, India. The community got established in Delhi during the tenure of Sa'adullah Khan Chinioti, the Punjabi grand vizier of Shah Jahan, in the 17th century.

They also settled in a number of other cities, chiefly Kolkata, and towns in western Uttar Pradesh, such as Agra, Aligarh, Meerut, Moradabad, Bareilly, Pilibhit, Rampur, Kanpur; including areas that now fall in the state of Uttarakhand; namely Roorkee, Nainital and Haldwani. After the partition of India, and subsequent independence of Pakistan in 1947, many members of the community migrated to Pakistan, particularly Karachi and Lahore.

They are divided into various lineages and some also use Allah-Walay, Multani, Goronwalay, Beri, Kathuria, Namoonay Walay, Taar-Gitti Walay, Lahore Walay, Chawla, Chandna, Sarwana, Daftari, Jumlana, Kalia, Baweja, Kapray Walay, or Batla as a title.

== History ==
The community belongs to the Muslim Khatri community, some of whom were converted to Islam by Shams al-Din Multani. Some subgroups use the surname Shamsi (a disciple of Shams), in his honour. The families moved from Sargodha, Bhera, Khushab, and Pind Dadan Khan in what is now Punjab, Pakistan in the 17th century, on the invitation by Sa'adullah Khan Chinioti, the prime minister of the Mughal emperor Shah Jahan, in search of business opportunities to Uttar Pradesh and especially in Delhi.

== Quam-e-Punjabian Aonla ==
The Quam-e-Punjabian Aonla, is a separate subgroup of the Punjabi Saudagars. They are said to have settled in the town of Aonla in Rohilkhand in the early 17th century. The Aonla Punjabi Saudagar are now found scattered all over Rohilkhand, in particular, the city of Bareilly, where the settlement of Saudagar Tola is particularly ancient. In spite of their common ethnic origin with Qaum-e-Punjabian Delhi, they form a distinct community, with their own communal organisations. A significant number have immigrated to Kolkata and Mumbai. Their main Biradaris are the Soleja, Mahindarata, Chhabra, and Khera. A much smaller number have also settled in Karachi.

== Current position ==
The independence in 1947 was a traumatic event, and a significant portion of this community had to leave India. After the independence of Pakistan, a large number of these traders migrated to Lahore and Karachi. A few numbers of these traders migrated to Mecca and Medina and are usually referred to by the surname, “Ad-Dihlawi”. Some still continue to live in Delhi.

== Notable people ==
- Imran Ismail, former Governor of Sindh
- Sadia Dehlvi, Indian columnist and writer
- Tahir Shamsi, Pakistani professor of medicine
- Shamoon Sultan, founder of Khaadi

== See also ==
- Punjabi Muslims
- Punjabi Shaikh
