= Shaikhzada =

Baloch tribe in Balochistan, Pakistan

Shaikh hashiri
- Religions: Islam
- Languages: Urdu
- Populated states: Indian subcontinent
- Subdivisions: none

Shaikhzadah or Shaikhzada (Urdu: شيخ زاده) is a Baloch tribe in Balochistan, Pakistan.

== See also ==
- Shaikhs in South Asia
