= Madarij an-Nabuwwat =

Book by 'Abd al-Haqq al-Dehlawi

- Author: 'Abd al-Haqq al-Dehlawi
- Genre: Islamic
- Publication place: Worldwide
- ISBN: 9781157705017

Madarij-ul-Nabuwwah is a book by Sunni Islamic scholar 'Abd al-Haqq al-Dehlawi (1551–1642) who lived in Delhi during the Mughal era.

== See also ==
- List of Sunni books
