= Hostler =

Transport worker, either caretaker of horses or yard jockey

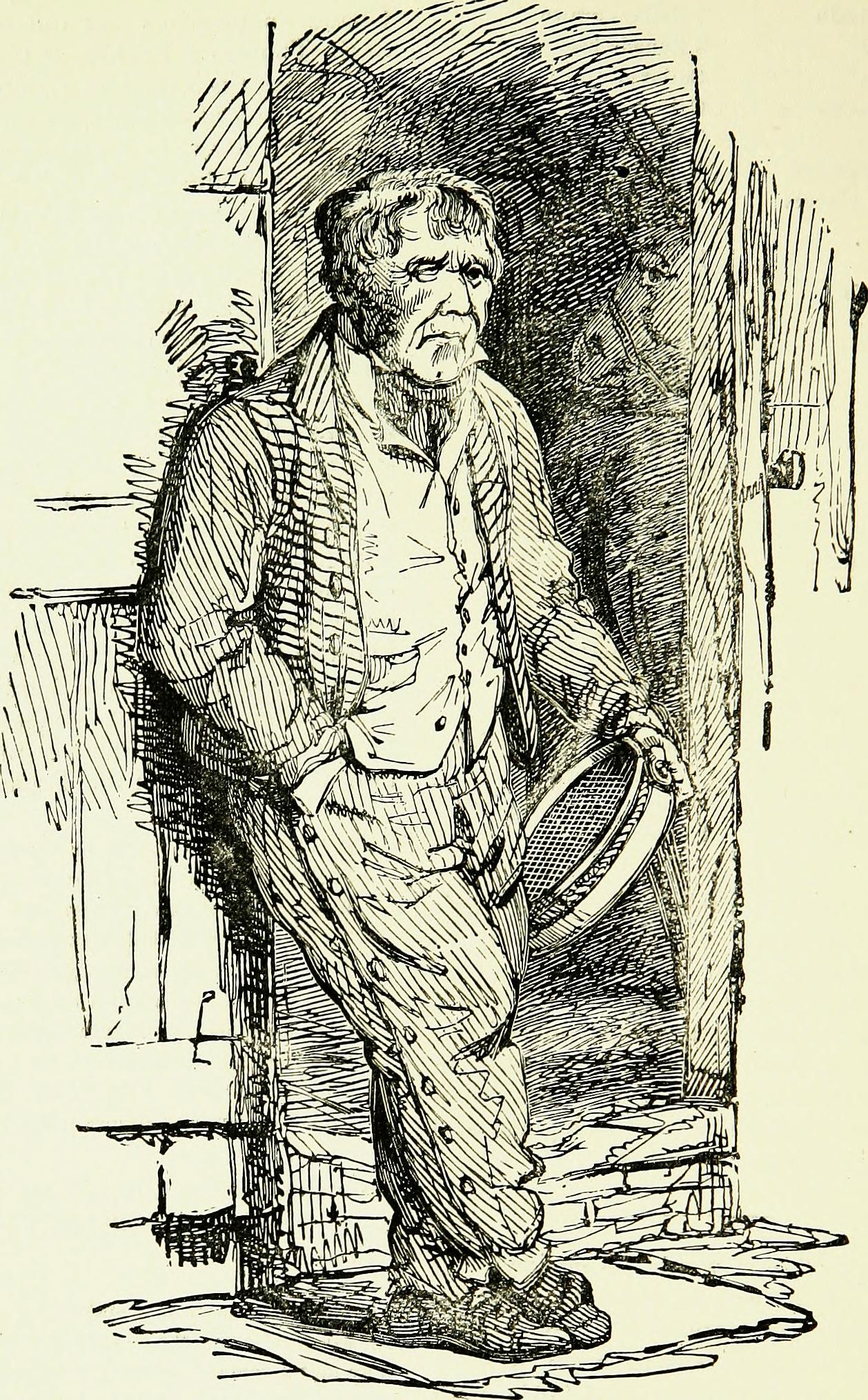
1827 drawing of an ostler at Keston Cross

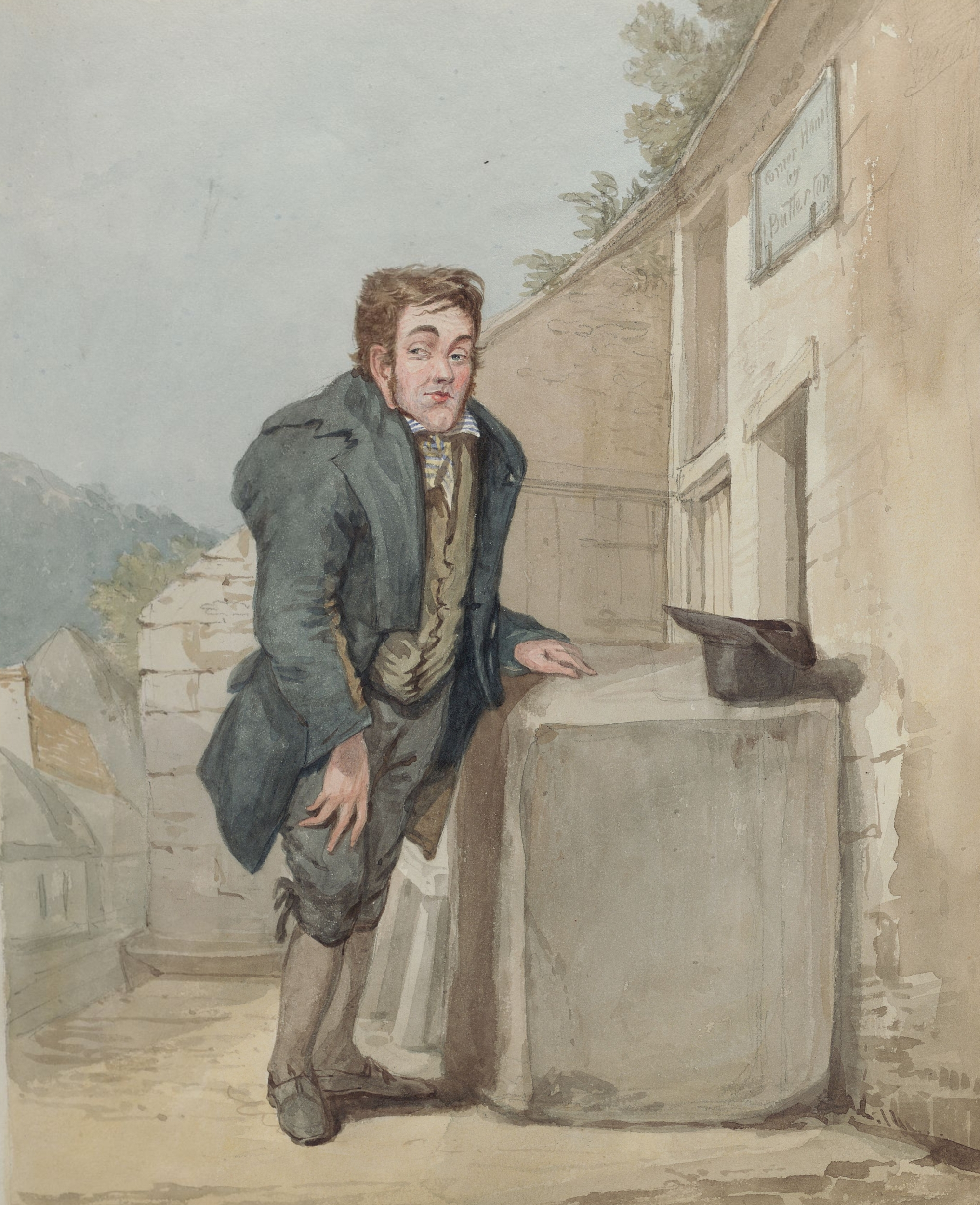
Ostler at Margam, 1818

A hostler (/ˈhɒslər/ or /ˈɒslər/) or ostler /ˈɒslər/ was traditionally a groom or stableman who was employed in a stable to take care of horses, usually at an inn, in the era of transportation by horse or horse-drawn carriage. In the twentieth century the word came to be used in the railroad industry for a type of train driver in rail yards with switcher locomotives or a type of truck driver in similar work with terminal tractors.

== Etymology ==
The word is spelled "hostler" in American English, but "ostler" in British English. It traces to c. 1386, meaning "one who tends to horses at an inn"—and also, occasionally, "innkeeper"—is derived from Anglo-French hostiler (modern French hostelier), itself from Medieval Latin hostilarius "the monk who entertains guests at a monastery", from hospitale "inn" (compare hospital, hospitaller, hospitality). A similar word, hostelero (innkeeper, the one that took care of a hostal), exists in Spanish.

== Modern uses ==
According to the Dictionary of Occupational Titles, an ostler in motor transportation is a type of truck driver who directs trucks or tractors at vehicle parking or docking areas to move, position, or park trucks or trailers. In the United States railroad industry a hostler is a train driver, a type of railroad engineer who moves locomotives in and out of service facilities.

== See also ==
- Teamster
- Groom (profession)
