= Abd al-Haqq Dihlawi =

Sunni Islamic scholar

ʿAbd al-Ḥaqq Dihlawī

Personal life
- Born: 1551 Delhi
- Died: 1642 (aged 90–91) Delhi
- Resting place: Hauz-i-Shamsi
- Region: Islamic philosophy
- Main interest: Hadith

Religious life
- Religion: Sunni Orthodox Islam
- Denomination: Sunni
- Jurisprudence: Hanafi
- Tariqa: Chishti Qadri
- Creed: Maturidi

Senior posting
- Influenced by: Abu Hanifa; Mu'in al-Din Chishti
- Influenced: Islam in South Asia

ʿAbd al-Ḥaqq Dihlawī (1551–1642) was one of the most influential Islamic scholars of Mughal India, renowned primarily as a muhaddith who laid the foundations of hadith scholarship in the Indian subcontinent.

Born in Delhi, he travelled to the Hijaz, where he studied hadith extensively in Mecca and Medina before returning to India to revive rigorous hadith studies. He was affiliated with the Qadiriyya Sufi order, yet firmly grounded in Sunni orthodoxy. Al-Dehlawī authored numerous works in Arabic and Persian, including commentaries on hadith, biographies of scholars, and treatises that integrated fiqh, hadith, and tasawwuf without diluting doctrinal discipline.

== Biography ==
He was born in 1551 (958 AH) in Delhi, hence the suffix Dihlawi to his name. In 1587 (996 AH), he made the pilgrimage to Mecca, where he remained for the next three years studying hadith and Sufism under various scholars. Upon his return to Delhi, he taught for half a century, and authored more than 100 works, including a history of Medina, and a work on the lives of saints.

== Death ==
He died in Delhi, in 1642 (1052 AH). His mausoleum is located at the edge of Hauz-i-Shamsi near Qutub Minar, Mehrauli, Delhi.

== Works ==
- Akhbar al Akhyar, 16th Century. Urdu Edition 1990.
- Sharh Mishkat Shareef, known as Ashatul Lam'at
- Perfection of Faith (Translation), Adam Publishers.
- Madarij-ul-Nabuwwah
- Tārīh-i Haqqī (The History by Haqq). General history of South Asia from the time of the Ğūrids to the 42nd year of Mughal Emperor Akbar’s reign (1005/1596-7).
- Takmeel-Ul-Iman (Farsi) - Book regarding beliefs of Suni Muslims.
- Aashoora - A book containing 16-17 pages written on the day of Aashoora
- Taeede Hanafi Mazhab - book written on Hanafi Madhab
- Taaruf Fiqh o Tasawwuff
- Zubdat-ul-Aasaar Talkhees Bahjat-ul-Asraar
- Sharah Fatooh Ul Ghaib
- Milad e Rasool e Azam
- Tareekh e Madina

== See also ==
- List of Islamic scholars

== Bibliography ==
- Mohd, Aqeel (2008). Shaikh Abdul Haque's Contribution to the Science of Hadith (PhD). Aligarh Muslim University.
