= A Syce Holding Two Carriage Horses =

Painting by Shaikh Muhammad Amir of Karraya

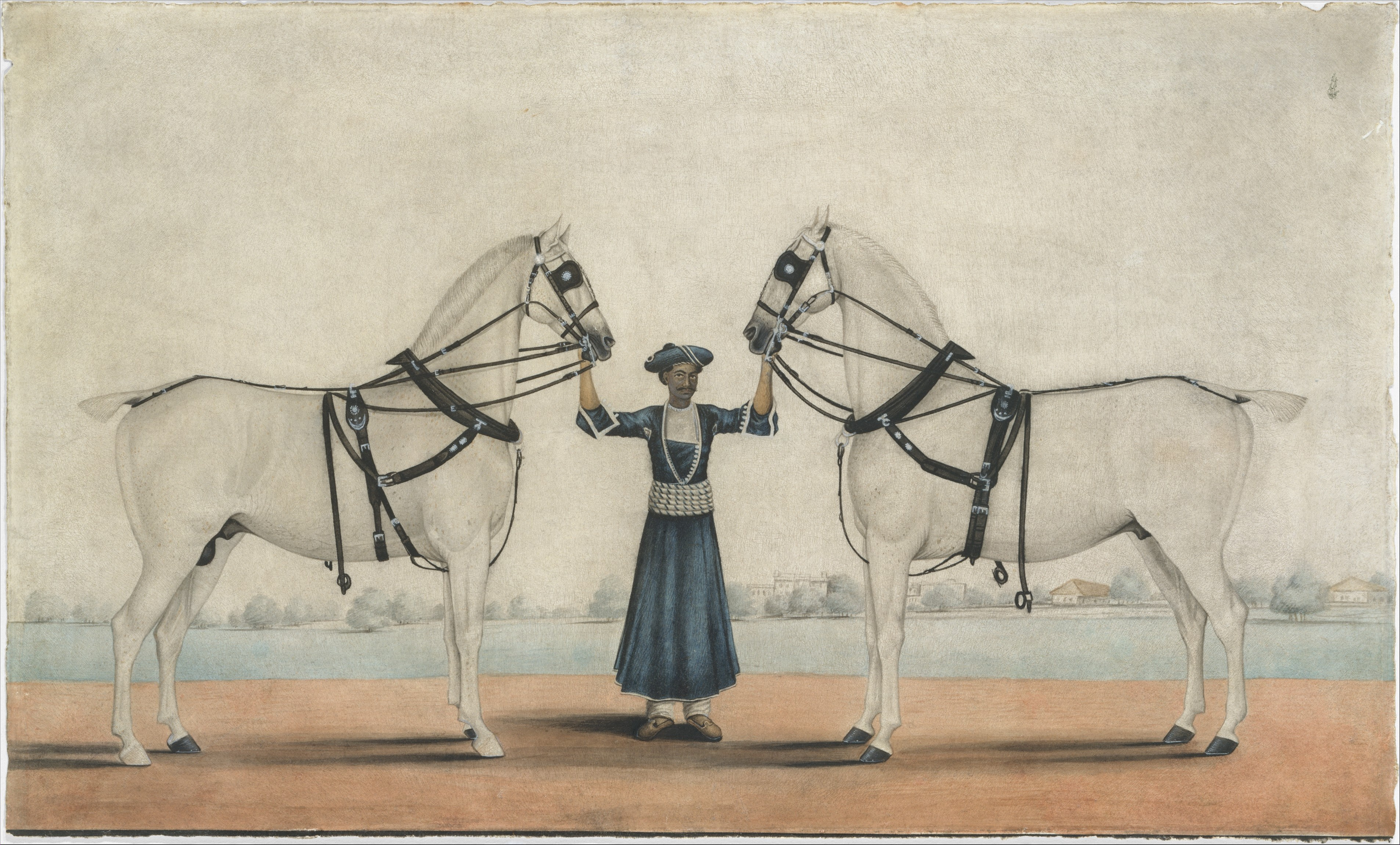
- Artist: Shaikh Muhammad Amir of Karraya
- Year: c. 1854
- Medium: Watercolor
- Dimensions: 30.5 cm × 50.8 cm (12.0 in × 20.0 in)
- Location: Metropolitan Museum of Art, New York City
- Accession: 1994.280

A Syce (Groom) Holding Two Carriage Horses is a watercolor painting by Shaikh Muhammad Amir of Karraya. The painting was finished circa 1845 in Calcutta, India. It is now in the Metropolitan Museum of Art in New York. It is an example of Company painting by Indian artists for the British in India.

The work is on view in the Metropolitan Museum's Gallery 464.
