= Sheik =

Sheik or Sheikh, literally 'elder' in Arabic, is the honorific title for the ruler of a tribe.

Sheik or The Sheik may also refer to:

== Arts and entertainment ==
- The Sheik (novel) a 1919 novel by Edith Maude Hull
  - The Sheik (film), a 1921 silent film starring Rudolph Valentino, based on the novel
  - The Son of the Sheik, a 1926 sequel to the earlier film also starring Rudolph Valentino
  - She's a Sheik, a 1927 film starring Bebe Daniels, based on the novel with a gender-reversed plot
- "Sheik", a 1973 song on ZZ Top's album Tres Hombres
- Sheik (The Legend of Zelda), an alias/disguise of Princess Zelda, mainly appearing in the 1998 game The Legend of Zelda: Ocarina of Time
- The Sheik, a character in the 1989 American action comedy movie Speed Zone
- "The Sheik", a 1988 episode of the American children's comedy science fiction sitcom Small Wonder

== People ==
- Blaize Shiek, American dancer
- Duncan Sheik (1969–2026), American singer-songwriter and composer
- Irina Sheik (born 1986), Russian supermodel

=== Professional wrestlers ===
- Adnan Al-Kaissie (1939–2023), frequently billed as The Sheik
- Ed Farhat (1926–2003), American wrestler who performed as "The Sheik"
- The Sheik II (born 1974), ring name of American wrestler Joseph Cabibbo
- The Iron Sheik (1942–2023), ring name of Iranian wrestler Khosrow Vaziri
- Shawn Daivari (born 1984), American wrestler who has performed as "Sheik Abdul Bashir"

== Other uses ==
- Sheik condom, a North American brand of condoms
- Sheiks, Hollywood High School's mascot

== See also ==
- Chad Morgan (1933–2025), Australian singer and comedian commonly referred to as "The Sheik of Scrubby Creek"
- Mississippi Sheiks
- Cheikh (disambiguation)
- Shaik (disambiguation)
- Shaikh (disambiguation)
- Sheikh (disambiguation)
