= Shaik Salauddin =

Indian Trade Unionist

- Born: 1985 (age 40–41); Amberpet
- Occupation: Trade Union Activist
- Years active: 2014-
- Other political affiliations: Telangana Four Wheeler Drivers' Association; Telangana Gig and Platform Workers Union

Shaik Salauddin (/ʃeɪkˈsæləˈʌdɪn/) is an Indian trade unionist. He has worked with app-based ride-hailing companies since 2012 and has been a driver organizer in Hyderabad since 2014. In his role as an organizer, he founded Telangana Four Wheeler Driver's Association to represent the interests of outsourced, contracted and other private drivers. In 2016, he established the Telangana State Taxi and Drivers' Joint Action Committee, which brought 20 drivers' associations and unions in the state under one organizational umbrella. He is the founder President of Telangana Gig And Platform Workers Union(TGPWU), and other gig transport workers. This includes the workers on platforms such as Ola, Uber, Swiggy, Zomato, Rapido and Dunzo, since 2019. In India First Person Organize Gig and Platform Workers Co-founder and National General Secretary, Indian Federation Of App Based Transport Workers (IFAT) He is also the founder and current president of the Telangana Four Wheeler Drivers' Association.

In this role, he has helped to advise and coordinate efforts across states, organizing collective action of drivers and delivery workers and meeting policy makers and other stakeholders. He has also been a key petitioner in petitions in the Supreme Court of India supporting platform workers' rights in India intending to avail social security benefits for app-based gig workers. He has also coordinated with political parties including the Indian National Congress regarding concerns of the platform based gig workers, especially during the Bharat Jodo Yatra. In 2022, he started a new organization called Telangana Gig and Platform Workers' Union (TGPWU).

His active advocacy resulted in bringing key policy reforms and discussions around social security and other rights of the platform-based gig workers, resulting in the Rajasthan Platform-based Gig Workers Bill, followed by the Karnataka Platform-based Gig Workers Bill. He was awarded the Shram Shakti Award by Ch. Malla Reddy, Minister for Labour and Employment, Factories, and Skill Development, Government of Telangana.
