= Sadia Dehlvi =

Indian writer (1957–2020)

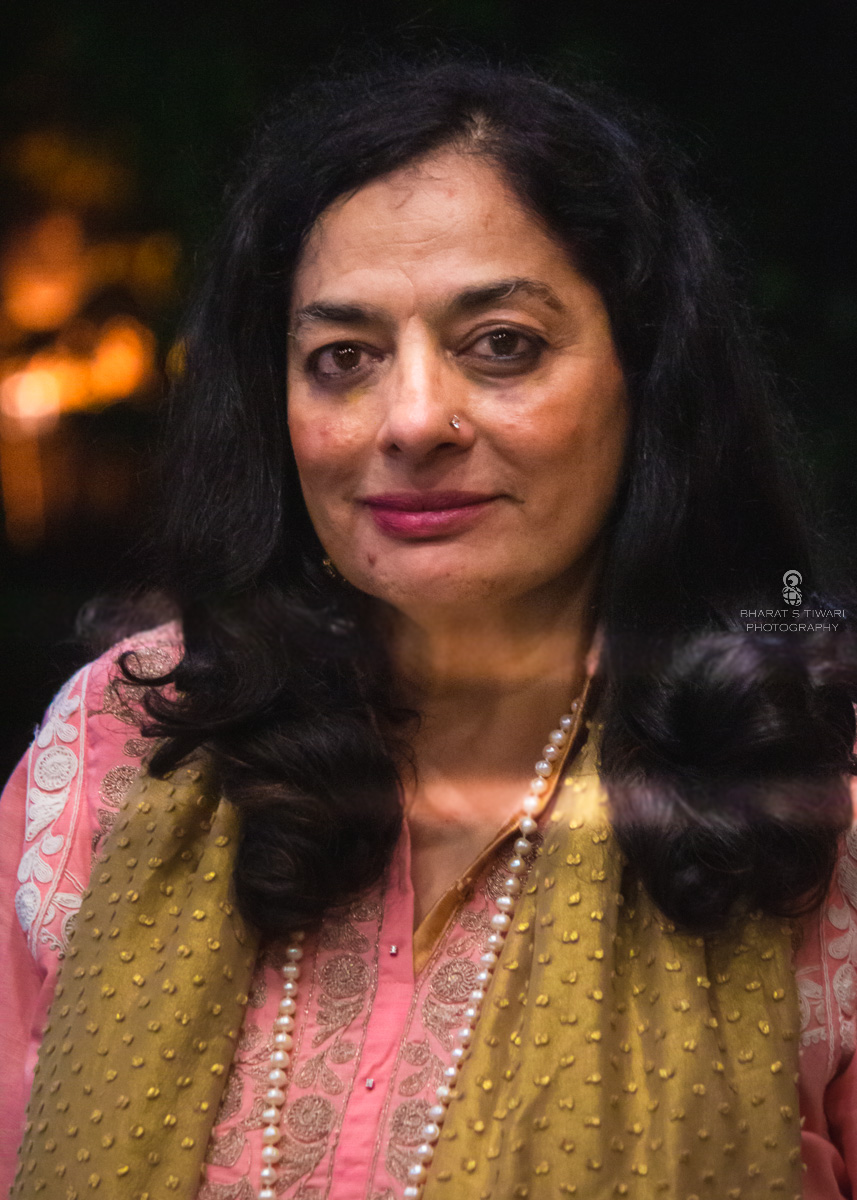
- Born: 1957; Delhi, India
- Died: 5 August 2020 (aged 62–63); Nizamuddin East, New Delhi, India
- Other name: Sadia Sayyed Karamat Ali
- Occupations: activist, columnist and writer
- Spouse: Sayyed Karamat Ali

Sadia Dehlvi (1957 – 5 August 2020) was a Delhi-based activist, writer and a columnist with the daily newspaper, the Hindustan Times, and frequently published in Frontline and Urdu, Hindi and English newspapers and magazines. She was a devotee of Khwaja Gharib Nawaz of Ajmer and Nizamuddin Auliya of Delhi. She criticized radical interpretations of Islam and called for a pluralistic understanding of Islam. She produced and scripted documentaries and television programs, including Amma and Family (1995), starring Zohra Sehgal, a veteran stage actor.

== Biography ==
Sadia Dehlvi was born in Delhi in 1957 into the Punjabi Saudagaran community. Her grandfather, Yusuf Dehlvi, and her father, Yunus Dehlvi, lived in Shama Kothi on Sardar Patel Road, in New Delhi where she was born. The one-time cultural hub of Delhi, today it houses Bahujan Samaj Party headquarters, (since 2002).

In April 2009 Dehlvi published a book on Sufism entitled Sufism: The heart of Islam published by HarperCollins Publishers, India. Her second book, The Sufi Courtyard: Dargahs of Delhi, detailing Delhi's Sufi history was also published by HarperCollins, India and released in February 2012.

She edited Bano an Urdu women's journal for the Shama Group, which published Shama an Urdu literary and film monthly. It eventually closed in 1999.

Dehlvi died on 5 August 2020.

== Personal life ==
She married a Pakistani, Reza Pervaiz, in 1990. She then stayed in Karachi, where the couple had a son, Armaan in 1992. This marriage lasted for 12 years but ended in a divorce when Pervaiz emailed her "Talaq" three times in 2002. She later married 45-year-old Sayyed Karamat Ali, whom she met at Hazrat Shah Farhad, a Sufi shrine in Delhi, which she had been visiting for the last 20 years. She later referred to herself as Sadia Sayyed Karamat Ali.

== Sufism ==
Dehlvi wrote Sufism: The Heart of Islam in which she details Islam's Sufi traditions and the importance of what she sees as the Sufi message of love, tolerance and brotherhood.

== Author ==
- Sufism, The Heart of Islam, HarperCollins, 2009. ISBN 81-7223-797-9.
- "Dilli ka Dastarkhwan" – chapter in City Improbable : An Anthology of Writings on Delhi/edited by Khushwant Singh. New Delhi, Viking, 2001, xv, 286 p. ISBN 0-670-91235-2.
- Dehlvi, Sadia (2012). The Sufi Courtyard: Dargahs of Delhi. HarperCollins. ISBN 978-93-5029-095-8.
- Dehlvi, Sadia (2017). Jasmine and Jinns: Memories and Recipes of My Delhi. HarperCollins. ISBN 9789352644360.

== Works ==
As Actress:

- Zindagi Kitni Khoobsoorat Hai (2001) TV series
- Amma and Family (1995) TV series

Producer:

- Not a Nice Man to Know (1998) TV series (associate producer)

Writer:

- Amma and Family (1995) TV series
