= Sheikh (Sufism) =

Sufi preachers

A Sheikh or shaykh (Arabic: شيخ, romanized: shaykh, pl. شيوخ, shuyūkh), of Sufism is a Sufi who is authorized to teach, initiate and guide aspiring dervishes in the Islamic faith. The sheikh is vital to the path of the novice Sufi, for the sheikh has himself travelled the path of mysticism. Viewed as the spiritual master, the sheikh forms a formal allegiance (bay'a) to the disciple of Sufism and authorizes the disciple's travels and helps the disciple along the mystical path. Islamic tradition focuses on the importance of chains and legitimization. In Sufism, sheikhs are connected by a continuous spiritual chain (isnad, sanad, silsila). This chain links every previous Sufi sheikh, and eventually can be traced back to the Successors, and in later times to the Prophet himself. As Sufism grew, influential sheikhs began to acquire spiritual centers and waypoints known as khanqah, ribat, and zaouia. Sheikhs duplicate the Prophetic realities, and are also expected to perform and act as an intermediary between the Creator and the created, since the sheikh has arrived close to God through his meditations and spiritual travels. There are several types of such sheikh.

The legitimacy of the sheikh is based on the unbroken chain of authors or other sheiks. The shorter the chain the more authoritative the person becomes. Teaching-sheiks provided their disciples with religious instruction as well as theology. During this time students travelled and interacted with different teacher-sheikhs. Sufi sheikhs flourished throughout the Islamic world more than any other type of personal authority because their mediatory skills were required for the smooth functioning of an agrarian-nomadic economy with a decentralized form of government.

== Khirka ==
An example of the importance of lineage in Sufism is the Khirka. Khirka, literally meaning 'Rough cloak, scapular, coarse gown,' an initiation process in Sufism known as "Investiture with the Cloak" in which the sheikh puts his khirka on the disciple. This acts as the manifestation of blessings being transmitted from sheik to disciple. The act is reminiscent of when Muhammad placed a cloak over Ali. After this the disciple is able to join the Sufi order and continue studying underneath the sheikh.

== Silsila ==
Silsila is used in Sufism to describe the continuous spiritual chain that links Sufi orders and sheikhs in a lineage relating back to Muhammad and his Companions.

== See also ==
- Pir (Sufism)
- Sheikh (disambiguation)
