= Cheikh Taba =

Cheikh Taba الشيخ طابا
- village
- Location within Lebanon
- Coordinates: 34°31′59″N 36°04′40″E
- Country: Lebanon
- Governorate: Akkar
- District: Akkar

Area
  - Total: 1.74 km^{2} (0.67 sq mi)
- Elevation: 220 m (720 ft)

Population (2009)
  - Total: 1,635 eligible voters
  - Density: 940/km^{2} (2,430/sq mi)
- Time zone: UTC+2 (EET)
  - Summer (DST): UTC+3 (EEST)
- Dialing code: +961

Cheikh Taba (Arabic: الشيخ طابا, romanized: ash-Shaykh Ṭābā) is a town in Akkar Governorate, Lebanon, close to the border with Syria.

The population in Cheikh Taba are mostly Greek Orthodox and Maronite.

== History ==
In 1838, Eli Smith noted the village as esh-Sheikh Taba, whose inhabitants were Greek Orthodox Christians, located west of esh-Sheikh Mohammed.

In 1856 it was named Sheikh Taba on the map of Northern Palestine/Lebanon that Heinrich Kiepert published that year.

== Bibliography ==
- Robinson, E.; Smith, E. (1841). Biblical Researches in Palestine, Mount Sinai and Arabia Petraea: A Journal of Travels in the year 1838. Vol. 3. Boston: Crocker & Brewster.
