= Soz Dehlvi =

Urdu poet

Mohammad Meer Soz Dehlvi (1720–1799) was an Urdu poet in the court of Nawab Asaf-ud-Daula. Soz was a master in Persian and Arabic language and an expert in calligraphy.

== Life and work ==
Mohammad Meer Soz son Ziauddin was born in 1720 in Delhi. His forefathers were from Bukhara and had migrated to India long back. His father Ziauddin was a prominent citizen of Delhi. Soz received his early education at home from his father and achieved a good knowledge of Persian, Arabic and religious studies. From his childhood he was very much inclined towards poetry and literature. In the beginning he adopted the pen name Meer but seeing the unusual popularity of Meer Taqi Meer he changed his mind and adopted Soz as his pen name.

Apart from poetry Soz was an expert in calligraphy, archery and horse riding. Peculiarity of his style and diction gave him popularity.

When he migrated from Delhi and finally arrived in Lucknow, Nawab Asaf-ud-Daula treated him with honour and respect and become his disciple too. This was a great honour for Soz. During his last days Soz kept himself in isolation and spent most of his time in prayers and other religious duties. He died in 1799 in Lucknow.
