= Muslim Kayasths =

Community of Muslims in Uttar Pradesh

Kayastha Musalman
Regions with significant populations
- India • Pakistan

Languages
- Urdu • Hindi • various Indic languages

Religion
- Islam

Related ethnic groups
- Kayastha • Shaikh of Uttar Pradesh

The Muslim Kayasths (Urdu: مسلمان کائستھ), also known as Siddiqui, are descendants of the Kayasth community of North India, mainly modern Uttar Pradesh, which embraced Islam during the medieval period. They are now mostly concentrated in the Pakistani provinces of Punjab and Sindh as well as northern India.

== History and origin ==
=== Origin ===
Muslim Kayasths consider themselves part of the Shaikh community and claim descent from Abu Bakr, as part of the wider trend of Ashrafization amongst Indian Muslim communities.

=== History ===
The Kayasths historically played a significant role in administration, particularly in maintaining land records, taxation, and governance. Kayasths were distinct from Brahmins, as they focused on secular knowledge like administration rather than religious scriptures. Their adaptability allowed them to thrive under changing political landscapes. Over time, some Kayasths converted to Islam, particularly during the Delhi Sultanate and Mughal Empire, while continuing to work in administrative and bureaucratic roles. Today, Muslim Kayasths primarily speak Hindustani (Hindi in India and Urdu in Pakistan). During Islamic rule, they served as scribes, officials, and administrators, quickly adapting to Persian, Arabic, and Turkish—the languages of governance. Their expertise in economics, taxation, and administration made them valuable.

== See also ==
- Kayastha
- Shaikhs of Uttar Pradesh
- Siddiqui
- Muhajirs
