= Cheikh Tidiane Gaye =

Senegalese-Italian writer (born 1971)

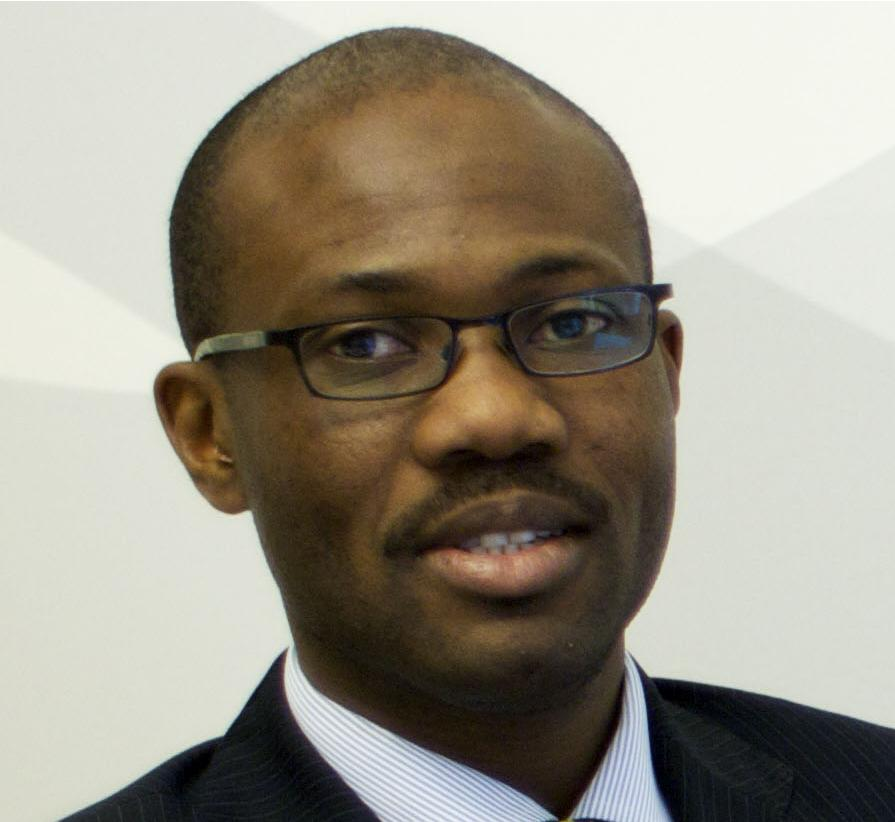
- Born: 1971 (age 54–55); Thiès, Senegal
- Occupations: Novelist, essayist, writer,
- Writing career
- Period: 2000–present
- Notable awards: Ordre des Arts et des Lettres, chevalier
- Website: www.cheikhtidianegaye.com

Cheikh Tidiane Gaye (born 1971 in Thiès, Senegal) Senegalese-Italian writer, essayist, poet and peace activist.

== Biography ==
He lives in Italy in the province of Monza and Brianza in Arcore and is also the literary founder of poetry and fiction of the City of Arcore. Participates in numerous meetings and cultural activities regarding African literature and immigration literature. He distinguished himself in numerous fields, leaving contributions as a poet, novelist. A well-known figure in Italian-language migrant literature, he has published several books of short stories and some of his poetic works are bilingual.

He is known as a follower of the singers of African orality and is the first African to translate the great poet of Negritude and the first president of the Republic of Senegal into Italian: Léopold Sédar Senghor. In the 2011 municipal elections in Milan, he was a candidate in support of the center left in the Milan Civica X Pisapia Sindaco Civic List.

In 2018 he founded the publishing house Kanaga Edizioni. In 2023 he was elected President of the Léopold Sédar Senghor International Academy. He is an ordinary member of the European Academy of Sciences and Arts. He is also President of the International Prize Léopold Sédar Senghor who started the 2015 edition. He received the appointment of Knight of the Order of Arts and Letters of the French Republic.

== International membership ==
- Member of the Academy of Science and Arts of Europe, Salsburg, Austria, 2024.
- Appointment of Wiki Academician Wikipoesia Academy – Encyclopedia of Italian poetry – April 2024.
- Knight of Academic Merit awarded by the Academy of Arts and Philosophical Sciences, Bari, 2023.
- Member of the Academy of Science, Arts and Literature of Europe, Paris, France, 2023.
- Honorary member of Academy Internacional "Mihai Eminescu", Romania, 2023.
- Associate Member of the Academia Hispanoamericano de Buenas Letras – October 2023.
- Honorary member of Academy of Arts and Philosofical Science, Bari, Italy,2022.
- Full member of the Tomitana Romania Academy – 2022.
- Nomination in academic capacity and honorary member of Asociaţiei Oamenilor de Ştiinţă, Cultură şi Artă Moldavia 2019.

== Bibliography ==
- Il Giuramento, Novel – Liberodiscrivere, Genoa, 2001.
- Mery, principlesa albina, with the preface by Alioune Badara Bèye, Novel – Edizioni dell’Arco, Milan, 2005.
- Il Canto del Djali, Poetry – Edizioni dell'Arco, Milan, 2007.
- Ode nascente/Ode nascente, Poetry- publication bilingual Italian-French, Edizioni dell'Arco, 2009.
- Curve alfabetiche, Poetry – Montedit Edizioni, 2011.
- L’étreinte des rimes/ Rime abbracciate, with the preface by Tanella Boni, poetry, Co-publication bilingual Italian-French, Éditions L'Harmattan Paris – France, 2012.
- Prendi quello che vuoi, ma lasciami la mia pelle nera, Novel- Preface by the Mayor of Milan Giuliano Pisapia, Editions Jaca Book Milan, 2013.
- Léopold Sédar Senghor: il cantore della negritudine, Poetry, Translation, Edizioni dell'Arco, 2014.
- Ma terre mon sang, Poetry, Ruba Editions, Senegal, 2018
- Il sangue delle parole, Poetry, Kanaga Edizioni, 2018
- Ombra, poetry, Kanaga Edizioni, 2022
- Voglia Di Meticciato – Il Dialogo Tra Le Culture Ed Etica, Essay, Kanaga Edizioni, 2022
- Les Litanies du cœur, Poetry, Kanaga Edizioni, 2023
- Siamo l'umanità - Costruire la pace per il bene dell'umanità, Essay, Kanaga Edizioni, 2024.
