= Molla Sheykh =

Molla Sheykh ملاشيخ
- Village
- Location within Iran
- Coordinates: 36°11′50″N 45°27′34″E
- Country: Iran
- Province: West Azerbaijan
- County: Sardasht
- Bakhsh: Central
- Rural District: Baryaji

Population (2006)
  - Total: 255
- Time zone: UTC+3:30 (IRST)
  - Summer (DST): UTC+4:30 (IRDT)

Molla Sheykh (Persian: ملاشيخ, also Romanized as Mollā Sheykh; also known as Sheykh) is a village in Baryaji Rural District, in the Central District of Sardasht County, West Azerbaijan Province, Iran. At the 2006 census, its population was 255, in 46 families.
