= Cheikh Sarr =

Senegalese hero

Cheikh Sarr was a Senegalese immigrant to Italy that died on Saturday August 21, 2004 while rescuing a swimmer from drowning in the ocean outside the beach at Marina di Castagneto, near Livorno. Sarr, who was 27 years old the day of his heroic deed, was posthumously awarded Italy's highest civilian honour for bravery.

== Biography ==
On August 14, 2004, he died, at the age of 27, after rescuing a man of Italian nationality who was in danger of drowning at sea. Sarr was swept away by the violence of the waves. According to reports, the survivor reportedly left without caring about the fate of his rescuer. Cheikh Sarr's body was found after two days.

The municipality of Castagneto awarded him honorary citizenship and arranged for his funeral in Donoratico cemetery and the transfer of the body to Senegal. The Senegalese worker, who is Islamic, had been in Italy since 1998 and worked as a bricklayer, was married and had a 10-month-old daughter, Yasin.

For this act of heroism, Italian President Carlo Azeglio Ciampi awarded him the Gold Award for Civil Valor on August 19.

On September 23, 2006, on the occasion of the Civil Defense Festival in Pisa, the 2nd “Marco Verdigi” Award in Memory of Cheikh Sarr was presented to his brother Kadim Sarr “for his selflessness and courage in making a selfless gesture.The award was presented to the brother Kadim Sarr.

== Bibliography ==
- Marco, Gasparetti (21 August 2004). "Archivio Corriere della Sera". archivio.corriere.it (in Italian). Corriere della Sera. Archived from the original on 31 October 2015.
- "Ciampi: "Al senegalese-eroe medaglia d'oro alla memoria"". www.repubblica.it (in Italian). la Repubblica. 19 August 2004.
