= Shaikh Yahya bin Ahmed Afifi =

Singapore politician (b. 1890, d. 1940)

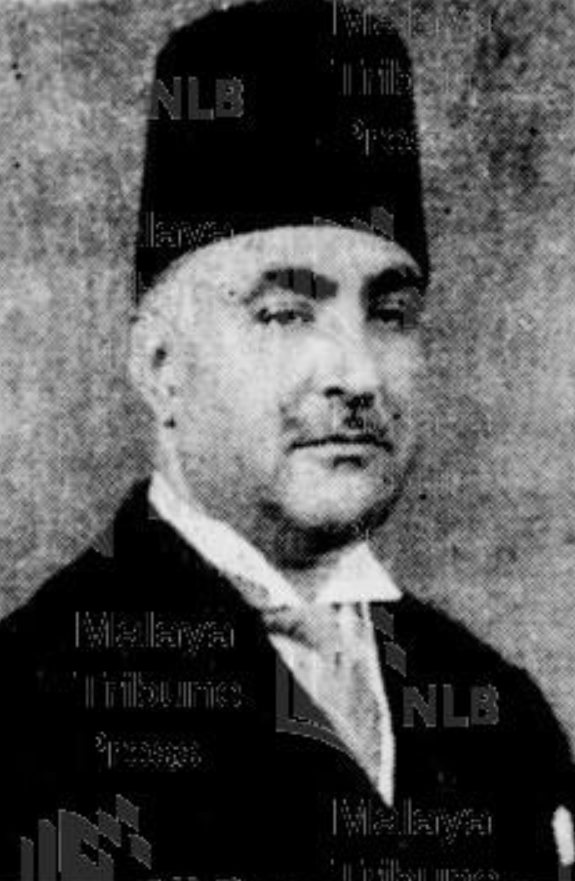
Shaikh Yahya bin Ahmed Afifi

Shaikh Yahya bin Ahmed Afifi (December 1890 – 12 July 1940) was a member of the Municipal Commission of Singapore and leader of the Arab community of Singapore.

== Early life and education ==
Afifi was born in Istanbul in December 1890. He was brought to Singapore in 1900. He attended the Kampong Glam Malay School, where he learnt to speak Malay, and later attended Raffles Institution, where he learnt to speak English.

== Career ==
After graduating from Raffles Institution, he joined the real estate firm of Alkaff and Co. in 1912. He eventually became the general manager of the firm, as well as the right-hand man of Syed Shaikh Alkaff. He was later appointed an attorney representing the company.

Afifi was the president of the Persenangan Stia Club, a prominent Malay club in Singapore. In 1925, he helped to found the Muslim Students' Aid Society. He also served as the society's president. He was also a member of the Singapore branch of the Straits Settlements Association. He was also a charter member of the Rotary Club of Singapore. He served as the president of the Arab Association, the vice president of the Muslim Association and a vice-president of the Clerical Union. He was a joint honorary secretary of the Masjid Sultan Building Fund, and the director of the Europe Hotel, Ltd., which owned the Europe Hotel. During World War I, he helped raise funds to support the British war efforts. He also served on the Poppy Day committee. He was made a justice of the peace in June 1932 for his contributions to public service.

In 1936, the Singapore Ratepayers' Association appointed him a member of the Municipal Commission of Singapore. He was also the association's vice-president. As a municipal commissioner, he opposed the transport monopoly in Singapore and attempted to rescind the houses along Malay Street. In early 1940, he became a trustee of the Singapore Improvement Trust.

== Personal life and death ==
In 1928, he was made a British subject. He died on 12 July 1940.

Jalan Afifi was named after him.
