= Tabish Dehlvi =

Writer, poet and novelist

Tabish Dehlvi تابش دہلوی
- Born: Syed Masood-ul-Hasan; 9 November 1913; Delhi, British India
- Died: 23 September 2004 (aged 90); Karachi, Pakistan
- Resting place: Sakhi Hassan Graveyard, Karachi
- Education: Darul Uloom, Hyderabad; University of Karachi (BA)
- Occupations: Writer; poet; broadcaster; newsreader
- Children: 5
- Writing career
- Language: Urdu, Hindi, Punjabi, English
- Notable awards: Tamgha-e-Imtiaz

Syed Masood-ul-Hasan Tabish Dehlvi, TI, (Urdu: تابش دہلوی) (born 9 November, 1911 - 23 September, 2004) was an Urdu poet. He was a broadcaster and Urdu news reader on radio in both India and Pakistan.

== Biography ==
He was born on 9 November, 1911, in Delhi as Syed Masood-ul-Hasan Tabish "Dehlvi" to Munshi Zakaulla. He obtained his early education from his mother and subsequently from Maulvi Sheiv Diyal. His grandfather, Maulvi Inayatullah, summoned him to Hyderabad-Deccan, where he concluded his secondary education at Darul Uloom. Subsequently, he became a student of the renowned poet Fani Badayuni in Hyderabad, India.

Due to a lack of financial means, Tabish was unable to continue his studies after completing matriculation. Consequently, he sought employment to support himself financially. He commenced his professional journey in the postal service in the role of a clerk. Later, he explored his old interest and became a member of All India Radio in 1941.

During partition, he moved to Karachi and joined Radio there as a broadcaster and news reader.

== Awards ==
Tabish received many awards in his lifetime and was finally decorated with the coveted award of Tamgha-i-Imtiaz by the government of Pakistan in 1998.

== Books ==
His notable collection of poetry includes:

- Nimroz (1963)
- Chiragh-e-Sehra (1982)
- Ghubar-e-Anjum (1984)
- Mah-e-Shikasta (1993)
- Kisht-e-Nawa (full collection)
- Nazr-e-Tabish
