= Sheykh Attar =

Sheykh Attar شيخ عطار
- Village
- Location within Iran
- Coordinates: 35°30′48″N 46°27′59″E
- Country: Iran
- Province: Kurdistan
- County: Marivan
- Bakhsh: Sarshiv
- Rural District: Gol-e Cheydar

Population (2006)
  - Total: 188
- Time zone: UTC+3:30 (IRST)
  - Summer (DST): UTC+4:30 (IRDT)

Sheykh Attar (Persian: شيخ عطار, also Romanized as Sheykh ‘Aţţār and Shaikh Attār; also known as Sheykh) is a village in Gol-e Cheydar Rural District, Sarshiv District, Marivan County, Kurdistan Province, Iran. At the 2006 census, its population was 188, in 42 families. The village is populated by Kurds.
