= Muslim Khatris =

Muslim Khatri
Regions with significant populations
- • India • Pakistan • Europe • United States • Canada • Australia • Dubai • Saudi Arabia • United Kingdom

Languages
- • Punjabi • Urdu-Hindi

Religion
- Islam

Related ethnic groups
- Khatris • Aroras • Punjabi Sheikh

The Muslim Khatris are descendants of the Khatri community of Punjab who embraced Islam during the medieval period. Today they mostly live in the Pakistani provinces of Punjab and Sindh as well as in northern India. The community is scattered throughout Punjab and Kutch.

== Origin ==
Khatris, from which Muslim Khatris are descended, are a Punjabi community. The origins of the community lies in the Punjab region, and the word Khatri itself is Punjabi form of Kshatriya.

The Khatri historian Baij Nath Puri wrote that Khatri Muslims had mostly converted during the middle of the 16th century and that in Punjab, such as in Multan and Jhang, they usually use the surname Khawaja, mainly hailing from the Kapoor clan.

== History ==
Khatris are divided into several clans. Many of the Muslim Khatris formed scholarly and military class under Mughal Empire.

=== Punjabi Saudagaran-e-Delhi ===
The Qaume-e Punjaban community of Delhi is of Khatri ancestry. Historically, this community lived in Delhi, and other north Indian towns, but after the partition of British India many members migrated to Pakistan.

== Notable people ==
- Mirza Hasan Qatil, 18th-century Urdu and Persian poet
- Ehsan Elahi Zaheer, Ahl-i Hadith scholar
- Mohammad Ibrahim Zauq, 18th-century Urdu poet
