= Faaiz Dehlvi =

Persian poet

- صدرالدین محمد خان فائز
- Born: Nawab Sadruddin Mohammad Khan; 1690; Delhi, Delhi Subah, Mughal Empire
- Died: 1738 (aged 47–48); Delhi, Delhi Subah, Mughal Empire
- Occupation: Poet
- Style: Ghazals Masnavis
- Father: Mohammad Khalil Zabardast Khan

Nawab Sadruddin Mohammad Khan Bahadur Faaiz (1690-1738), also known by his pen name Faaiz Dehlvi (Urdu; فائز دہلوی ), was an Urdu and Persian Poet. He is also regarded as the promoter of Indian culture and Traditions, along with being considered as the first Urdu poet of Northern India who composed poetry in Urdu and left a complete Diwan. His forefathers had come to India from Iran and settled in Delhi. His father Zabardast Khan was a noble man of distinction and had secured high positions and robes of honor from the Mughal emperors during the reign of Aurangzeb and Jahandar Shah, and was appointed as a Judge in Jaunpur in 1696 and an administration of Avadh in 1697.

== Biography ==
Faaiz was born in 1690 in Delhi. Faaiz got a good education and training under his father's supervision. Faaiz was brought up in a very disciplined and highly cultured atmosphere. He was gifted with a very fine literary taste. Under the Guidance of highly qualified teachers and well-established scholars, he developed a very refined taste for poetry and started writing poetry at an early age. Although Faaiz lived a happy and contented life, during his later years he had to face some financial problems. He became mentally upset and developed hysteric symptoms; consequently, he imprisoned himself in seclusion and stopped meeting people. Faaiz died in 1738 in Delhi and was buried there.

== His work ==
Faaiz was very knowledgeable of other sciences like logic, medicine, geometry, physiognomy etc. Faaiz was very fond of reading Persian classics and books of other prevailing subjects. He composed about nineteen thousand verses in Persian and five hundred verses in Urdu. His Diwan consists of Ghazals, Masnavis and other poems. Faaiz wrote in the local language commonly used in North India at that time. He used lots of words of dialects in his poetry and also adopted and used Persian compound words, similes, metaphors, etc. to improve the elegance of his poetry. His verses were marked by simplicity and lucidity. His work portrays divine love as well as the beauty and charm of the fair sex. His Ghazals mostly deal with the subject of love, in a very lucid and eloquent manner.
