= Shaikh Muhammad Amir of Karraya =

Indian painter (1830s-40s)

Shaykh Muhammad Amir
- শেখ মুহম্মদ আমির
- Citizenship: Bengal Presidency
- Occupation: Painter
- Years active: 1830s-40s

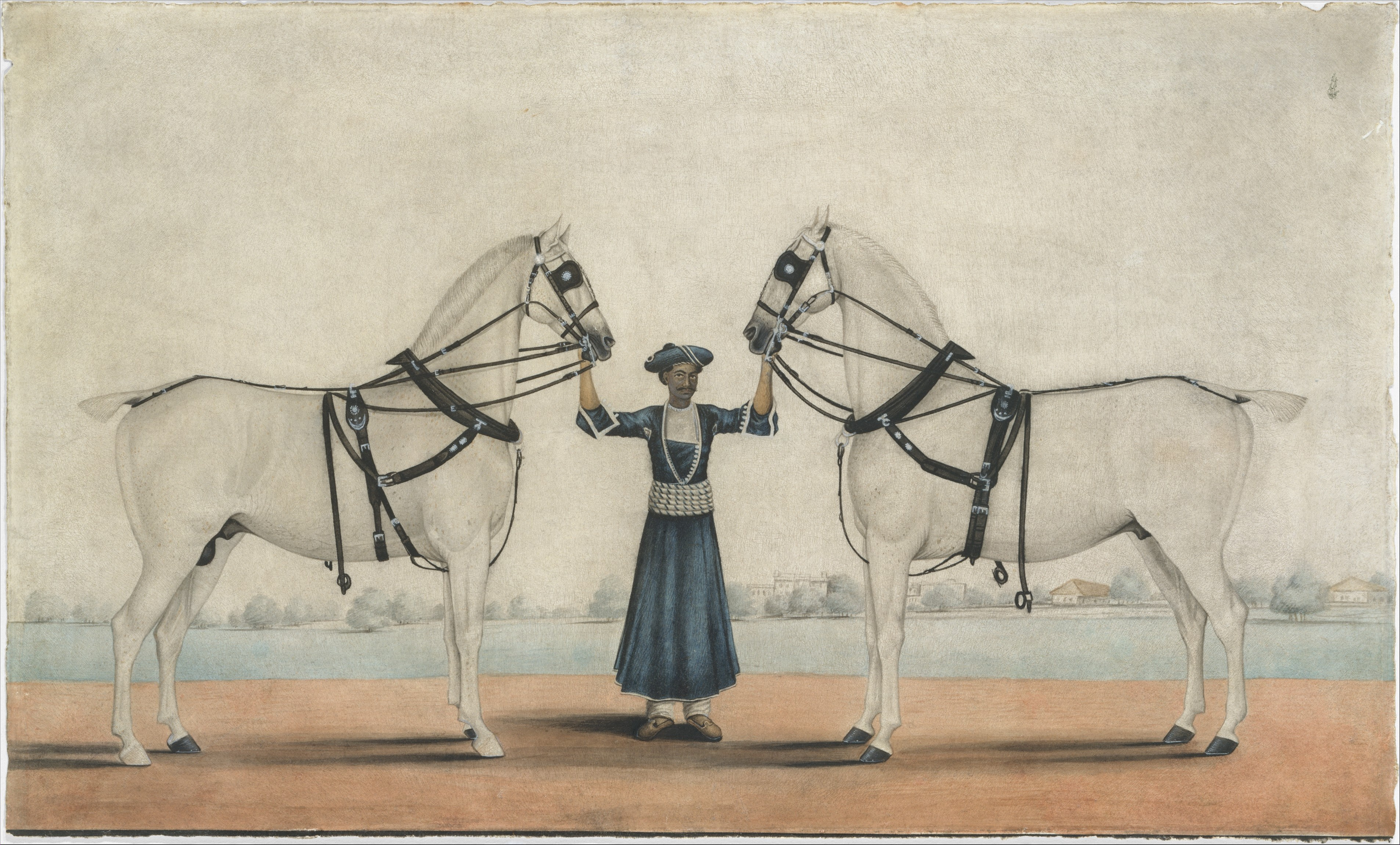
A Syce (Groom) Holding Two Carriage Horses.

Shaikh Muhammad Amir of Karraya (Bengali: শেখ মুহম্মদ আমির; fl. 1830s-40s) was a Bengali Muslim painter in the British Raj period from Karraya in Ballygunge, a suburb in Calcutta.

== Career ==
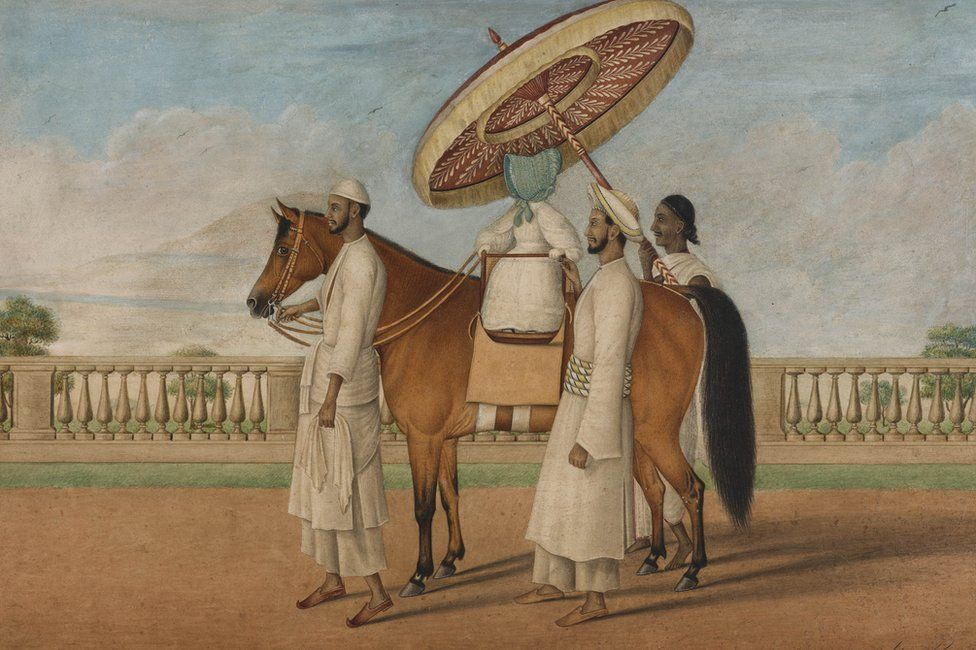
English child seated on a pony and surrounded by three Indian servants

His patron was Thomas Halroyd. Fanny Parks lithographed some of Amir's paintings into her 1850 book Wanderings of a Pilgrim in Search of the Picturesque. Some of his paintings can be found at the India Office Records in London's British Library. The work A Syce (Groom) Holding Two Carriage Horses in the collection of the Metropolitan Museum of Art is also attributed to Shaikh Muhammad Amir of Karraya.

Another work by Shaikh Muhammad Amir of Karraya is A Bay Racehorse with a Groom (ca.1842), which was recently acquired by the Yale Center for British Art. It may be viewed in the museum's Study Room by appointment.
