= Saidulla Khan Dehlavi =

Pakistani diplomat

Saidulla Khan Dehlavi was a Pakistani career diplomat.
