= Shaikhs in North India =

Family name of Indian muslims

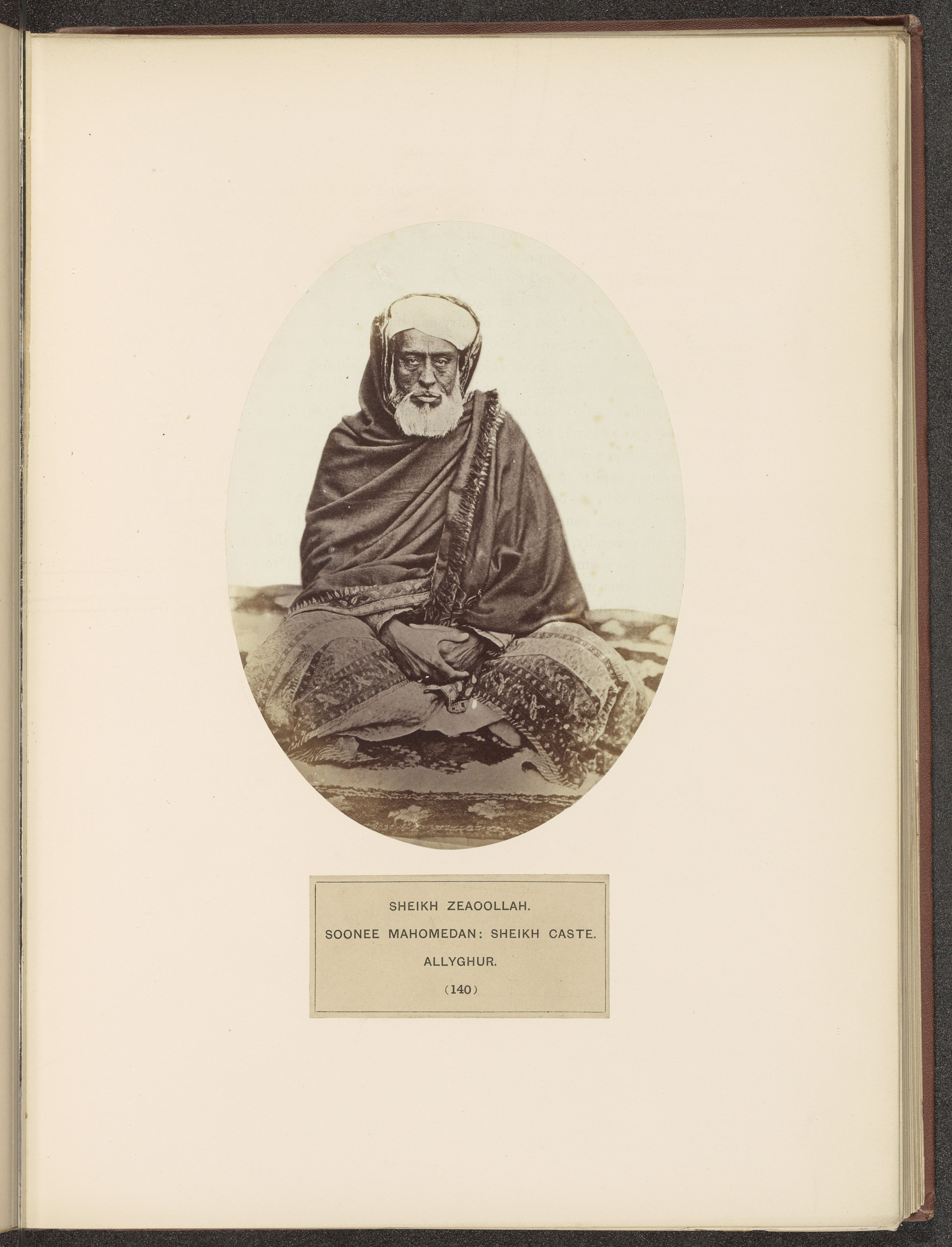
A Shaikh man from Aligarh, c. 1858–1868

Shaikh, also rendered as is a title given to many South Asian Muslim castes. It originally was a word or honorific term in the Arabic language that commonly designated a chief of a tribe, royal family member, Muslim religious scholar, or "Elder". However in Northern India, Shaikh was used as an ethnic title, by those with Arab descent & upper caste converts to Islam like Khatris, Brahmins, Kayasthas & Rajputs, etc., particularly from prominent Muslim figures such as the Rashidun Caliphs, majority of these.

== Origin ==
In North India, Shaikh is both an ethnic and occupational title attributed to Muslim trading families. Many Shaikhs from North India are descended from Arabs, and adopted 'Shaikh' as their last name through marriage or their job.

In the Frontier Regions and Punjab, the title Shaikh was given to recent converts who were not of foreign descent as a polite euphemism.

== Sub-divisions ==
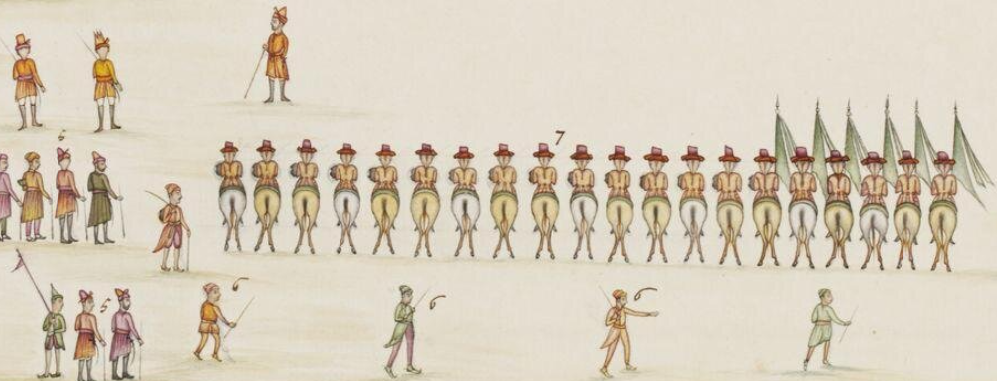
Camp of Shuja-ud-Daula of Awadh

The subdivisions of the Shaikh include:

- Shaikh Qidwai, who claim to be descendants of the Qazi Qidwa, a son of the Sultans of Rum. The Qidwai were recruited in the household cavalry of Shuja-ud-Daula, which was mainly composed of the Sheikhzadgan. These clans had not taken any profession other than a soldier or a civil officer.
- Shaikh Hashmi, who claim to be descendants of the Banu Hashim clan of the Banu Quraish tribe. The Islamic prophet, Muhammad belonged to this clan. Usually carry the title Sayyid.
- Shaikh Siddiqui, who claim to be descendants of Abu Bakar, the first Khalifa of Islam.
- Shaikh Usmani (Osmani), who claim to be descendants of Uthman Ibn Affan the third Khalifa of Islam
- Shaikh Farooqi, Honorific reverence to Umar Farooq Bin Al-Khattab
- Sheikh Alavi (Alvi), who claim to be descendants of Ali Ibn Abi Talib, the fourth Khalifa of Islam
- Sheikh Abbasi, who claim to be descendants of Abbas ibn abd-Muttalib, the uncle of holy Prophet Muhammad
- Shaikh Ansari,who belong & related with Hazarat Abu Ayyub Al-Ansari origin from Madina who was one of sahabi of holy Prophet Muhammad.
- Sheikh Mirza, who claim to be descendants of Umar Sheikh Mirza, the son of the conqueror Timur. They usually associate themselves with Mirza or Mughal caste, while some with the Sheikh caste while carrying the title Mirza.

== See also ==
- SheiShaikh
- ikhzada :
- Sindhi Shaikh
- Punjabi Shaikh
- Muslim Kayasths
- Kashmiri Shaikhs
- Gujarati Shaikh
- Rajasthani Shaikh
- Shaikh of Uttar Pradesh
