= Kashmiri Shaikh =

کٲشِری شیخ

Languages
- Kashmiri, Urdu

Religion
- Islam

Kashmiri Shaikh or Kashmiri Sheikh (Kashmiri: کٲشِری شیخ) is a Muslim community, who mainly live in the Kashmir and those who migrated to what is now Pakistani Punjab. The Kashmiri Shaikhs are considered to be a clan of Kashmiri origin also found predominantly in Pakistani Punjab and also in other parts of India.

After the advent of Islam into Afghanistan and Indian subcontinent, a significant number of Hindu Brahmins in Kashmir converted to Islam and adopted the title of Shaikh and later migrated to other regions of the country. In Punjab, they are known as Kashmiri Shaikhs. The Kashmiri Shaikhs are predominantly urban.

'According to the census return the number of Kashmiri Musulmans, who make up 60% of the inhabitants of the Jhelum River valley, was 765,442. They are no doubt mostly descendants of various Hindu castes, perhaps in the main of Hill Brahmans, but Islam has wiped out all tribal distinctions.

== Notable people ==
- Sheikh Abdullah, Kashmiri politician
- Ghulam Ahmad, Pakistani forestry official and businessman
- Sheikh Rasheed Ahmad, Pakistani politician
- Nadeem Anjum, DG ISI, Mohra Sheikhan, Pakistan.
- Allama Muhammad Iqbal, A Kashmiri Sheikh belonging originally to the Sapru Clan of Brahmins.

== See also ==
- Kashmiri Muslims
- Kashmiri Hindus
