= Shaikhs of Uttar Pradesh =

Shaikh
Regions with significant populations
- India

Religion
- Islam

Related ethnic groups
- Shaikh

The Shaikh are a Muslim community found in the state of Uttar Pradesh in India.

== History ==
Shaikh is a word or honorific term in the Arabic language that literally means "elder." It is commonly used to designate an elder of a tribe, a revered wise man, or an Islamic scholar. Some members of Kayasthas, Brahmins, Rajputs and Khatri communities also converted to Islam. Some Muslim Khatris, Brahmins and Rajputs use shaikh and khan as their surnames, and consider themselves belonging to the Shaikh community.

A community of early Shaikh are the Qidwai, whose ancestor was claimed to be Qazi Qidwa, a son of the Sultans of Rum, in what is now modern Turkey. The Qazi is said to have been sent to the Awadh region to spread Islam, where he is said to have won over fifty local villages to Islam. These fifty villages were later awarded to him, and the region became known as Qidwara. The converts of these fifty villages were called Qidwai. According to another tradition, Kazi Kidwa is said to have defeated a local ruler in the Awadh region by the name of Raja Jagdeopur. This Raja was said to have belonged to the aboriginal Tribal community. The original settlement of the tribe was Juggaur in Lucknow district, from where they spread to Barabanki District. These early colonists were often required to make converts, and these converts often adopted the clan name of those at whose hand they accepted Islam, and this led to a substantial growth in the Shaikh community.

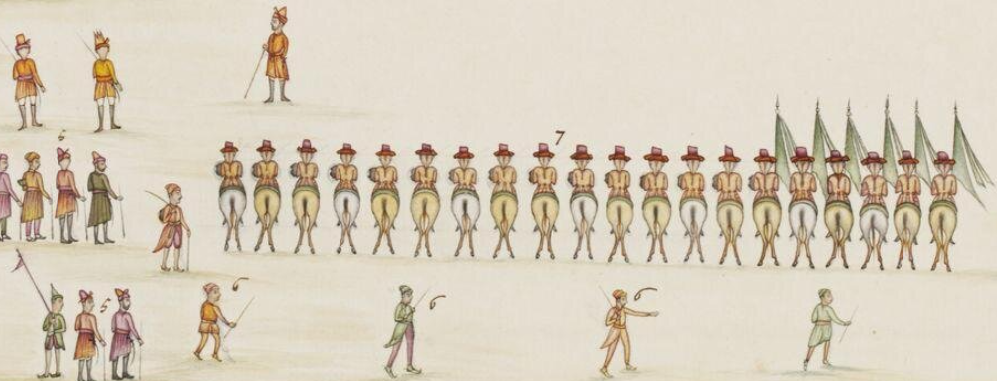
Camp of Shuja-ud-Daula of Awadh

The Qidwais were recruited in the household cavalry of Shuja-ud-Daula, which was mainly composed of the Sheikhzadgan.

Historically, the Siddiqui, Hashmi and Farooqui shaikhs of Awadh and Rohilkhand (Budaun and Bareilly) were substantial landowners, often zamindars, taluqedar and jagirdar. In the urban townships, Shaikh families served as priests, teachers and administrators, with the British colonial authorities giving the community a preference in recruitment as soldiers and civil officers.

Notable people from the Shaikh community:

- Muqarrab Khan
- Shaikh Farid Bukhari
- Anwaruddin Khan
- Muhammad Ali Khan Wallajah
- Umdat ul-Umara
- FS Hussain
- Nasser Hussain
