= Punjabi Shaikh =

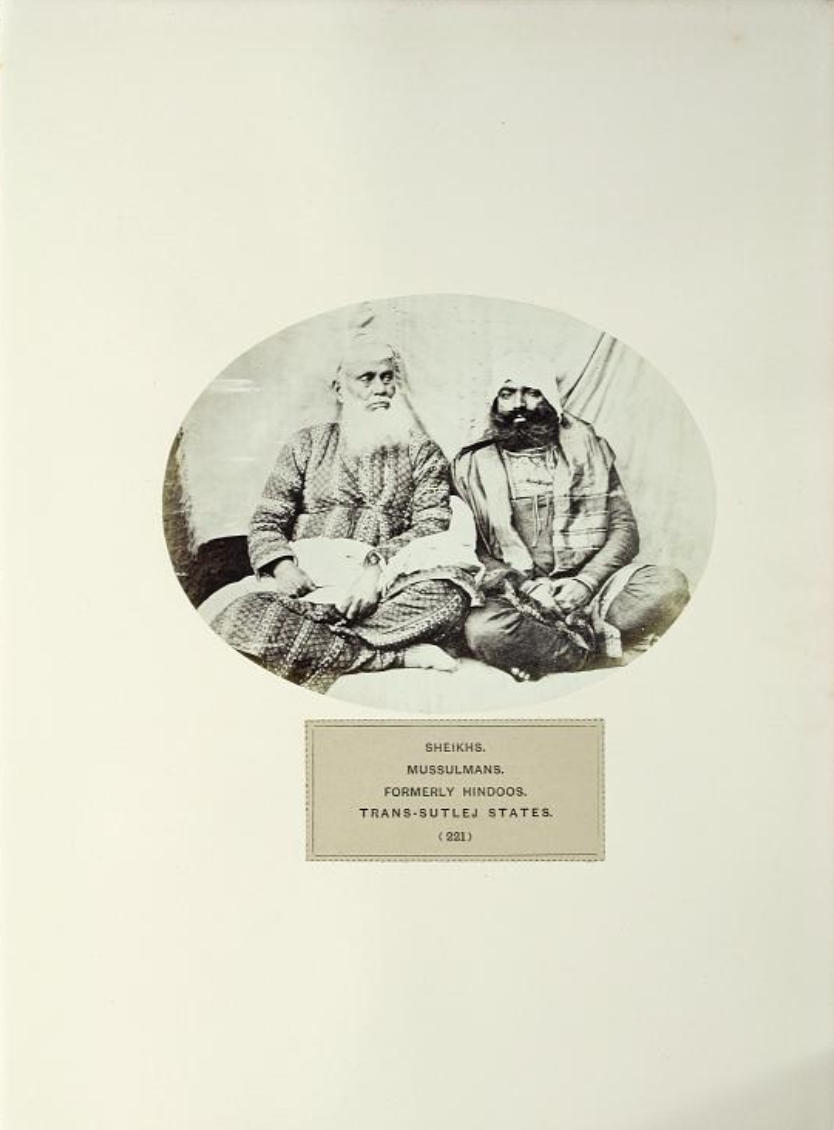
- Punjabi Sheikhs from the Trans-Sutlej States in 1869

Regions with significant populations
- Pakistan

Languages
- Punjabi; English • Urdu

Religion
- Islam

Punjabi Shaikh (Punjabi: پنجابی شيخ) is a Punjabi Muslim community and a branch of the Shaikhs in South Asia. In Punjab, the title Shaikh was given to recent converts to Islam and not to those of Arab descent as a polite euphemism.

The Shaikh caste were originally agricultural and can be found in the Faisalabad, Chiniot and Rawalpindi districts of Punjab. However, in recent years, they have become urbanised and are involved in business and trade. The Punjabi Shaikhs are well-off but have a small population in the Punjab. Notable people include Sheikh Rasheed Ahmad, a Pakistani politician.

== Notable people with this surname ==
- Ehsan Elahi Zaheer, a Pakistani Islamic scholar
- Sheikh Rasheed Ahmad, a Pakistani politician and a businessman
- Javed Shaikh, a Pakistani actor and film director
- Saleem Sheikh, a Pakistani actor
- Shahnaz Sheikh, a Pakistani field hockey player
- Shehnaz Sheikh, a Pakistani TV actress
- Farooq Sheikh, an Indian film actor

== See also ==
- Qanungoh Shaikh
- Punjabi Saudagaran-e-Delhi
- Siddiqui
- Sindhi Shaikh
- Mian (surname)
