= List of Pakistani family names =

The following are some of the tribal names in Pakistan.

== Naming system ==
Pakistani surnames are divided into three categories: Islamic naming convention, cultural names and ancestral names. In Pakistan a person is either referred by his or her Islamic name or from tribe name (if it is specified), respectively.

== Islamic / Indo-European ==
- Mohammad
- Khan

== Baloch tribal names ==
- Bizenjo(Baloch tribe)
- Bugti
- Buledi
- Buzdar
- Chandio
- Chhalgari
- Damanis
- Darzada
- Dehwar
- Dewala
- Domki
- Gabol
- Golo
- Gadhi
- Gashkori
- Ghazini
- Gurmani
- Jagirani
- Jamali
- Jarwar
- Jatoi
- Jiskani
- Kalmati
- Kalpar
- Kambarzahi
- Kashani
- Kenagzai
- Khalol
- Khetran
- Khushk
- Khara
- Langhani
- Loharani
- Lund
- Magsi
- Malik
- Marri
- Mazari
- Mirza
- Mugheri
- Pitafi
- Qaisrani
- Rahija
- Rahmanzai
- Rind
- Rind (Baloch tribe)
- Ravani
- Saifi
- Sanjrani
- Satti
- Sherzai
- Shirani
- Syed
- Thingani
- Talpur
- Umrani
- Wadeyla
- Zardari

== Brahui tribal names ==
- Bangulzai
- Bizenjo (Brahui)
- Bahrani
- Hasni
- Jhalawan
- Khanzada
- Kharal
- Kurd
- Lango
- Lehri
- Mirwani
- Mengal
- Muhammad Shahi
- Raisani
- Rodini
- Sarpara
- Sasooli
- Shahwani
- Sumalani

== Gujarati clan names ==
- Alpial
- Bhatia
- Lakhani
- Memon
- Patel

== Kashmiri clan names ==
- Butt
- Dar
- Kashmiri Shaikh
- Khawaja
- Lone
- Malik clan (Kashmir)
- Mir
- Wani

== Punjabi clan names ==
- Arain
- Aulakh
- Ansari
- Bahmani
- Bajwa
- Bangial
- Basra
- Baig
- Bhabra
- Batwal
- Bhati
- Barsar
- Buttar
- Chattha
- Chaudhry
- Chauhan
- Chughtai
- Derawal
- Dhariwal
- Dhillon
- Dogar
- Duggal
- Gakhar
- Gill
- Grewal
- Gujjar
- Gurmani
- Ibrahim
- Indra
- Iqbal
- Janjua
- Jatt
- Jutt
- Johiya
- Kathia
- Kahloon
- Khara
- Khandowa
- Kharal
- Khokhar
- Kamboh
- Kirmani
- Sahni
- Khawaja
- Langra
- Langrial
- Lau
- Leel
- Longi
- Machi
- Mahar
- Mahtam
- Makhdoom
- Malik
- Meghwar
- Meo
- Mirza
- Mian
- Mighiana
- Minhas
- Mughal
- Muslim Khatris
- Rajput
- Nanda
- Paracha
- Parihar
- Passi
- Patel
- Sheikh (Punjabi)
- Qureshi
- Raja
- Ranjha
- Roy
- Sahi clan
- Sangha
- Sanghera
- Satti
- Sehgal
- Sukhera
- Sethi
- Sheikh
- Shanzay
- Sial
- Siddiqui
- Sidhu
- Sandhu
- Shah
- Sirki
- Tarar
- Uzair
- Virk
- Warraich

== Sindhi clan names ==
- Abro
- Arain
- Bhati
- Bhutto
- Bughio
- Burfat
- Channa
- Chachar
- Chhutta
- Chauhan
- Chandio
- Dahar
- Detha
- Dodai
- Dhareja
- Daudpotro
- Effendi
- Gurchani
- Hingora
- Hingorja
- Halaypotra
- Indhar
- Jokhio
- Jakhro
- Joyo
- Jogi
- Jareja
- Junejo
- Jamote
- Jadgal
- Kalhoro
- Khowaja
- Kalwar
- Khaskheli
- Kachela
- Khuhro
- Kehar
- Khushk (Baloch)
- Kumbhar
- Lakhani
- Lohana
- Langah
- Langha
- Lasi
- Lanjar
- Mahar
- Mahesar
- Memon
- Mirani
- Malkani
- Mirbahar
- Mallah
- Miyano
- Mangnejo
- Mugheri
- Magsi
- Numria
- Ogahi
- Palh
- Palijo
- Panhwar
- Parihar
- Qureshi
- Qaimkhani
- Rajar
- Rajper
- Rahimoon
- Rathore
- Roonjho/Runjho
- Rind (Baloch)
- Samma
- Shah
- Shaikh
- Soho
- Shoro
- Solangi
- Sheedi
- Siyal
- Soomro
- Thebo
- Thaheem
- Unar
- Waryah
- Wagan
- Wassan

== Saraiki tribal names ==
- Ansari
- Arain
- Bhait
- Bhati
- Bosan
- Bukhari
- Chachar
- Chandio
- Chughtai
- Hashmi
- Kalwar
- Khokhar
- Laar
- Makhdoom
- Malik
- Noon
- Panwar
- Qureshi
- Rind
- Ravani
- Raronjah
- Shah
- Sial
- Sipra
- Soomro
- Tangwani

== Pashtun tribal names ==
- Achakzai
- Afridi
- Alizai (Note: Muhammad Zaheer-ud-Din Khan Alizai)
- Akakhel
- Badrashi
- Bangash
- Banuchi
- Bettani
- Burki
- Chamkani
- Dawar
- Dilazak
- Durrani
- Gandapur
- Esakhelvi
- Jadoon
- Kakakhel
- Kakar
- Kakazai
- Kasi
- Khalil
- Khattak
- Lohani (Rohani)
- Lodi
- Mahsud
- Mamund
- Marwat
- Musakhel
- Niazi
- Orakzai
- Popalzai
- Panni (Balailzai)
- Swati
- Sadduzai
- Sherani
- Sulemani
- Suleimankhel
- Suri
- Tareen
- Utmankhel
- Wazir
- Yousafzai

== Iranian ancestral names ==
- Ansari
- Bukhari
- Chishti
- Fareedi
- Firdausi
- Gardezi
- Ghazali
- Gilani
- Hamadani
- Hameed
- Isfahani
- Jafari
- Jalali
- Jamshidi
- Kashani
- Kayani
- Kermani
- Askari
- Mirza
- Montazeri
- Muker
- Nishapuri
- Noorani
- Pirzada
- Qadiri
- Qizilbash
- Razavi
- Reza
- Rizvi
- Rouhani
- Sistani
- Yazdani
- Zain
- Zand

== Arabic ancestral names ==
These surnames are mostly common among Urdu-speaking people and Shia Muslims.

- Abbasi
- Abidi
- Alvi
- Awan
- Bukhari
- Baqri
- Dhanial
- Ehsan
- Farooqi
- Ghazali
- Hashmi
- Hassan
- Hussain
- Hussaini
- Hyder
- Hyderi
- Idrisi
- Jafari
- Kazmi
- Khagga
- Makhdoom
- Mousavi
- Najafi
- Osmani
- Qazi
- Qidwai
- Rizvi
- Sadat
- Saeed
- Saifi
- Sajjadi
- Salehi
- Sayyid
- Siddiqui
- Taqvi
- Tirmizi
- Turabi
- Usmani
- Wasti
- Zubairi
- Zaidi

== Turkic ancestral names ==
- Agha
- Baig
- Barlas
- Effendi
- Gul
- Mirza
- Mughal
- Pasha
- Tanoli
