= List of Baloch tribes =

Ethnic group in South Asia

Following is the list of notable Baloch tribes and clans:

== B ==
- Bajkani
- Babbar
- Bangulzai
- Baranzai
- Barazani
- Bhurgari
- Bugti
- Buzdar
- Buledi
- Bijarani
- Bizenjo

== C ==
- Chandio

== D ==
- Dodai
- Damani
- Domki

== G ==
- Gabol
- Gurchani

== J ==
- Jamaldini
- Jarwar
- Jatoi
- Jamali

== K ==
- Khoso
- Katbar
- Khushk
- Kaisrani

== L ==
- Lanjwani
- Langove
- Lashari
- Leghari
- Lund
- Loharani
- Langhani

== M ==
- Magsi
- Marri
- Mazari
- Mengal
- Mullazai
- Muhammad Shahi

== N ==
- Noohani

== P ==
- Pitafi
- Powadhi

== Q ==
- Qaisrani

== R ==
- Rakhshani
- Rind

== S ==
- Sanjrani
- Sarmastani
- Shirani

== T ==
- Talpur

== U ==
- Umrani

== W ==
- Wadhela

== Y ==
- Yarahmadzai

== Z ==
- Zardari

== Baloch tribes in Diaspora ==
- Baluch (Rajasthan) (India)
- Baluch (Uttar Pradesh) (India)
- Makrani caste (in Gujarat, India)

== See also ==
- Iranian peoples
