= Langrial =

Langrial may refer to:

- Langrial, Abbottabad, a village in Abbottabad district, Pakistan
- Langrial (Gujrat district), a village in Punjab, Pakistan
- Langrian, a village in Punjab, India
- Langrial clan, a tribe of Jatt and Rajput people
- Nauman Ahmad Langrial, Pakistani Politician
