= 1997 Balochistan Provincial Assembly election =

Elections to the Provincial Assembly of Balochistan were held in 1997. Balochistan National Party formed a coalition government with Jamhoori Wattan Party; Akhtar Mengal became the Chief Minister of the province.

== Results ==
Constituency-wise result
Constituency Number	Constituency Name	Name	Party
PB-1	Quetta I	Abdul Rahim Khan	PKMAP
PB-2	Quetta II	Sardar Nisar Ali	Independent
PB-3	Quetta III	Saeed Ahmed Hashmi	PML(N)
PB-4	Quetta IV	Moulana Allahdad Khair-Khawa	JUI(F)
PB-5	Chagai	Haji Ali Mohammad Notezai	JWP
PB-6	Pishin I	Sardar Ghulam Mustafa Khan Tareen	PKMAP
PB-7	Pishin II	Mohammad Sarwar Khan Kakar	PML(J)
PB-8	Killa Abdullah I	Bismillah Khan Kakar	PPP
PB-9	Killa Abdullah II	Haji Bahram Khan	JUI(F)
PB-10	Loralai I	Sardar Abdul Hafeez Khan	Independent
PB-11	Loralai II	Moulvi Ameer Zaman	JUI(F)
PB-12	Barkhan	Sardar Abdur Rehman Khetran	PML(N)
PB-13	Zhob-cum-Killa Saifullah	Moulana Faizullah Akhunzada	JUI(F)
PB-14	Zhob	Jaffar Khan Mandokhail	PML(N)
PB-15	Killa Saifullah	Moulana Abdul Waseh	JUI(F)
PB-16	Sibi	Mir Abdul Jabbar	JWP
PB-17	Ziarat-cum-Sibi	Moulvi Nasibullah	JUI(F)
PB-18	Kohlu	Hyrbyair Marri	Independent
PB-19	Dera Bugti	Saleem Akbar Bugti	JWP
PB-20	Jaffarabad I	Mir Jan Mohammad Khan Jamali	Independent
PB-21	Jaffarabad II	Mir Faiq Ali Jamali	Independent
PB-22	Jaffarabad-cum-Nasirabad	Zahoor Hussain Khoso	JWP
PB-23	Naseerabad	Sardar Fateh Ali Umrani	JWP
PB-24	Kachhi I	Mohammad Asim Kurd Galloo	JWP
PB-25	Kachhi II	Sardar Mir Chakar Khan	Independent
PB-26	Jhal Magsi	Nawab Zulfiqar Ali Magsi	Independent
PB-27	Mastung	Sardar Bahadur Khan Bangulzai	BNP
PB-28	Kalat-cum-Mastung	Prince Mossa Jan	BNP
PB-29	Kalat	Mir Israrullah Zehri	BNP
PB-30	Khuzdar I	Wadera Abdul Khaliq	JUI(F)
PB-31	Khuzdar II	Sardar Muhammad Akhtar Mengal	BNP
PB-32	Awaran	Mohammad Aslam Gichki	BNP
PB-33	Kharan	Mir Abdul Karim Nosherani	BNM
PB-34	Lasbela I	Shahzada Muhammad Yousaf	PML(N)
PB-35	Lasbela II	Sardar Muhammad Saleh Bhotani	Independent
PB-36	Panjgur	Asadullah Baloch	BNP
PB-37	Kech I	Syed Ehsan Shah	BNP
PB-38	Kech II	Muhammad Aslam	BNM
PB-39	Kech III	Mir Mohammad Ali Rind	BNP
PB-40	Gwadar	Mir Abdool Ghafar Kalmati	BNP
Reserved for Christian		Shaukat Naz	Independent
Reserved for Hindus		Tara Chand	Independent
Reserved for Sikhs, Buddhists, and Parsis		Satram Singh	Independent
