= Seistan Force =

British Indian Army unit in World War I

The Seistan Force, originally called East Persia Cordon, was a force of British Indian Army troops set up to prevent infiltration by German and Ottoman agents from Persia (Iran) and Balochistan into Afghanistan during World War I. The force was established to protect British interests in Persia from subversion by German agents, most notably Wilhelm Wassmuss. The force was also tasked to intercept and destroy the Turco-German expedition to Kabul that sought Afghan alliance in the Central war effort and Afghan assistance to wartime revolutionary conspiracies in British India.

== Unit history ==
In August 1914 (at the start of World War I) a small force, under the orders of the 2nd Quetta Brigade, was maintained in Western Balochistan to suppress arms traffic. In July 1915 this force was expanded and became the East Persia Cordon to prevent enemy infiltration from Persia into Afghanistan. A similar Russian Cordon was established to prevent infiltration into north-west Afghanistan. From March 1916 the force became the Seistan Force under the commander-in-chief in India. Following the Revolution in Russia, the Malleson mission was sent to Trans-Caspia and the Seistan Force became the Lines of Communication for the Mission from September 1918 under the orders of the 4th (Quetta) Division. With the withdrawal of the force from Trans-Caspia, the troops in Persia were withdrawn and the last elements left in November 1920.

The Germans established contact with the Baloch and provided them military strategy. The Baloch war with the British army resulted in several clashes and casualties to the British forces in Makran in 1916.

=== Despatches ===
The following is part of the text of a despatch by General Sir Charles Monro, Commander-in-Chief, India, on military operations in the Indian Empire from March 1916 to March 1917, published in the London Gazette on 31 October 1917:

In conjunction with the Russians a small force was maintained in East of Persia to ensure the tranquillity of this region and frustrate the activity of German agents. Raids on the lines of communication of the force were made by the Baloch and certain Baloch tribes of Persian Baluchistan, notably the Damanis of Sarhad with strategic and military assistance from the German agent, Zugmayer. In order to prevent these, and to control the Damanis, Brig.-Gen. R. E. Dyer, Commanding in East of Persia, moved a part of his force to Khash in May, 1916.

In July the hostile attitude of the Damanis necessitated punitive measures. The Damanis are a Baloch tribe which divided into two main sections, the Yarmahomedzai and the Gamshadzais. Brig.-Gen. Dyer determined to move to Gusht in order to intervene between these two sections, and to deal with each in detail. Operations in the vicinity of Gusht from 12th July to 29th July resulted in the capture of the bulk of the Yarmahomedzai flocks and herds, the infliction of considerable loss, and the separation of the two Damani sections. During this period several small actions were fought under trying conditions of climate and terrain, the chief engagement being one at Kalag, near Gusht, on 21st July.

Sardar Jiand Khan Yarahmadzai, Juma Khan the tribal chief of the Ismaelzais and Khalil Khan Gamshadzai fought against Reginald Dyer, in the battle Jiand lost his son and the Gamshadzais chief (Khalil Khan) got killed during one of the battles. two of the yarahmadzais lost their lives while the losses for Dyer were devastating.

On the 5th October 1916, Brig.-Gen. Dyer returned to India on account of ill-health, and was succeeded in command of the Sistan force by Brig.-Gen. C. O. O. Tanner.

As a result of the above operations agreements were arrived at with the chiefs of the Damanis, by which they promised to pay certain fines and to refrain from future hostility. The fines imposed have now been paid in full, and the settlement has allowed of a portion of the Sistan force being withdrawn to Quetta. The troops maintaining a cordon in Sistan were engaged with hostile bodies on three occasions.

At Kalmas, on 26th September, a party of 23 men of the Light Cavalry and 36 levies, under the command of 2nd Lt. Wahl, attached Light Cavalry, defeated a party of gunrunners, capturing a large number of rifles, ammunition, and camels. 2nd Lt. Wahl was killed on this occasion.

Near Chorab, on the 24th March, 1917, a party consisting of 16 men of the Light Cavalry and one British officer and 25 men of the Punjabis, the whole under the command of Captain J. A. C. Kreyer, Cavalry, attacked a gunrunner's caravan. The whole of the transport of 20 camels, as well as 447 rifles and some 23,600 rounds of ammunition were captured.

== Commanding officers ==
- Lt Colonel J. M. Wikely, August 1915
- Brig-General Reginald Dyer, March 1916
- Brig-General C. O. O. Tanner, October 1916
- Lt Colonel (later Brig-General) G. A. Dale, May 1917

== See also ==
- Dunsterforce
