= Ali Rizvi =

Ali Rizvi or Ali Razvi may refer to:

- Ali A. Rizvi (born 1975), Pakistani-born Canadian physician, writer and ex-Muslim atheist activist
- Ali Rizvi Badshah, Canadian comedian
- Ali Hussain Rizvi (born 1974), former Pakistani cricketer
- Naushad Ali (cricketer) (1943–2023), Naushad Ali Rizvi, Pakistani cricketer
- Syed Ali Nawaz Shah Rizvi (born 1942), Pakistani politician
- Syed Ali Qutab Shah Rizvi, member of the Pakistani Sindh Provincial Assembly

== See also ==
- Rizvi
