= Khumra =

Khumra may refer to:

- Khumra (Islam), an Islamic community in India
- Khumra (Judaism), a prohibition or obligation in Jewish practice
- Ali Abu Khumra (born 1981), Iraqi filmmaker
