= Usmani =

Usmani, Othmani or Uthmani is a large Muslim community (Urdu: عثمانی), found mainly in South Asia.

== Notable people ==
=== Last name ===
- Fazlur Rahman Usmani, Indian Muslim scholar
- Aziz-ul-Rahman Usmani, Indian Muslim scholar
- Shabbir Ahmad Usmani, Pakistani Muslim scholar
- Atiqur Rahman Usmani, Indian Muslim scholar
- Rafi Usmani, Pakistani Muslim scholar
- Taqi Usmani, Pakistani Muslim scholar
- M. A. G. Osmani, Bengali military leader
- Sumayya Usmani, Pakistani-born Scottish food writer
- Vjosa Osmani, fifth President of Kosovo
- Maskoor Usmani, Indian politician

=== Given name ===
- Osmany Cienfuegos, Cuban politician
- Osmani García, Cuban rapper
- Osmany Juantorena, Cuban-Italian volleyball player
- Osmani Urrutia, Cuban baseball player

== See also ==
- Abbasi (disambiguation)
- Alavi
- Behna
- Farooqi
- Gardezi
- Hashemi
- Osmany
- Quraishi
- Siddiqui
