= Mir Abdul (given name) =

Mir Abdul is a given name. Notable people with the name include:

- Mir Abdul Ali, Indian police detective
- Mir Abdul Jabbar Khan, Pakistani politician
- Mir Abdul Karim Nousherwani, Pakistani politician
- Mir Abdul Majid Abro (born 1981), Pakistani politician
- Mir Abdul Qayyum (1939–1971), Bangladeshi psychologist and martyr
- Mir Abdul Rasool Mir (1950–2019), Sindhi Language poet and educationist
