= Wadhela (tribe) =

Tribe in Pakistan

Wadhela is a Baloch tribe inhabiting the Makran division of Balochistan. They are one of the principal tribes in the Kulanch sub-tehsil of Pasni city in Gwadar. They also inhabit the Kech district of Balochistan, where they were largely responsible for the '1898 Baloch uprising' of Gokprosh.

Some of their principal sub-tribes are the Shahbekzai, Bijarzai, Gamizai, Mahmadzai, Bukkarzai, Saeetzai and Kaurkuchi. Majority of these sub-tribes live in regions of Gwadar, Bahu Kalat, Dashtiari, Kulanch, Turbat and Chabahar.
