= Rizvi =

Rizvi or Ridhwi رِضوي
- Al-Rida
- Nisba: al-Musawi al-Ridhwi al-Taghwi or Taqvi
- Location: Iraq; Kuwait; Iran; Pakistan; India; UK
- Descended from: Al-Musawi, Kazmi, Rizvi, Taqvi
- Parent tribe: Banu Husayn
- Branches: Musawi,Kazmi,Rizvi,Taqvi,Al-Mushhadi
- Religion: Shia Islam
- Surnames: Shah, Syed,Al-Musawi , Kazmi, Rizvi,Taqvi,Mashhad/al-Mashhad

Rizvi or Razavi (Arabic/Urdu: رضوي) is the Urdu variant of the Arabic surname Ridawi and the Persian surname Razavi. It is a Muslim surname commonly associated with the branch of Husaynids, who claim descent from the Imam Ali al-Rida, a descendant of the Islamic prophet Muhammad through his grandsons, Husayn ibn Ali (patrilinealy, through his great great-grandfather Ali Zayn al-Abidin, who was the son of Husayn) and Hasan ibn Ali (through his great great-grandmother, Fatima bint Hasan, who was the daughter of Hasan). Since the Rizvi clan traces their lineage to Fatimah (the prophet's daughter), many of them often use the prefix Sayyid (or its synonyms) before their name.

== Notable people with the surname ==
=== Rizvi or Razavi ===
- Abis Rizvi, Indian film producer and businessman
- Adeebul Hasan Rizvi, head of Sindh Institute of Urology and Transplantation (SIUT)
- Ali Hussain Rizvi, Pakistani cricketer
- Anusha Rizvi, Bollywood director
- Asif Iqbal Rizvi, Pakistani cricketer
- Gowher Rizvi, Bangladeshi historian
- Haidar Abbas Rizvi, Pakistani politician
- Syed Hasan Rizvi was a Pakistani Urdu poet under the pen name Shakeb Jalali
- Jalaluddin Rizvi, Indian field hockey player who represented India
- Khawar Rizvi, poet in Urdu and Persian
- Khurshid Rizvi, Pakistani scholar, poet, linguist and historian of Arabic languages and literature
- Komal Rizvi, Pakistani singer and TV host
- Majida Rizvi, first woman judge of a High Court in Pakistan
- Naushad Ali Rizvi, Pakistani cricketer
- Parveen Rizvi, known as Sangeeta, is a Pakistani film actress, director and producer.
- Qasim Razvi was the leader of a local militia, the Razakars of Hyderabad, India who masterminded a Hindu pogrom in Princely state of Hyderabad.
- Saeed Rizvi is a Pakistani film director, producer, and writer.
- Ayatollah Sa'id Akhtar Rizvi was an Indian advocate of Islam in East Africa.
- Suhail Rizvi is an Indian-American co-founder and Chief Investment Officer of Rizvi Traverse Management.
- Ayatollah Syed Ahmed Rizvi Kashmiri was a Shia Mujtahid
- Allamah Syed Ali Akhtar Rizvi was an Indian Twelver Shī'ah scholar, public speaker, author, historian and poet.
- Syed Ali Nawaz Shah Rizvi is a Pakistani politician.
- Syed Ali Qutab Shah Rizvi was a member of the Pakistani Sindh Provincial Assembly.
- Syed Meesaq Rizvi was a Pakistan sprinter and middle-distance runner.
- Syed Shaukat Hussain Rizvi was a pioneer of the Pakistani film industry.
- Syed Zaheer Rizvi is a Pakistani music director and teacher.
- Uzma Z. Rizvi is an archaeologist and anthropologist whose work focuses on urbanization and decolonizing practice.
- Zameer Rizvi is a Canadian singer and musician
- Ziauddin Rizvi was a Shi'a cleric born at Aumphary, Gilgit

=== Kazmi or Musawi ===
- Shah Abdul Latif Kazmi (1617–1705), known as Bari Imam, Qalanderi poet and philosopher of Fiqh E Jafria IthnaAshria
