= Abdul Kadir Ali Muwaya =

Sheikh Abdul Kadhir Muwaya
- Born: 1950; Kavule Village, Mayuge District, Uganda
- Died: September 26, 2014 (aged 63–64); Mayuge District, Uganda
- Cause of death: Assassination
- Other name: Dakhtur (Doctor)
- Citizenship: Ugandan
- Education: Namakoko Islamic Primary School; Machakos Islamic High School; Bilal Muslim Mission, Mombasa; Islamic philosophy studies, Hawza of Qom; Master's degree – Imam Khomeini International University; PhD (1985)
- Occupations: Islamic scholar, social activist, translator
- Organizations: Ahlul Bait Islamic Foundation; Bilal Muslim Mission
- Known for: Leadership of the Shi'ite Muslim community in Uganda; founding the Ahlul Bait Islamic Foundation
- Notable work: Translation of the speeches and works of Ali Hosseini Khamenei
- Children: 12
- Relatives: Sheikh Ibrahim Saad Luwemba (maternal uncle)

Sheikh Abdul Kadhir Muwaya (1950–2014) also known as Dakhtur (Doctor) was a social activist and translator from Uganda. He was the leader of the Shi'ite Muslim sect in Uganda who was assassinated at his home in 2014.

== Early life and education ==
Muwaya was born in 1950s in a family of 14 children in Kavule village, Imanhyiro Sub-county in Mayuge District. His mother was from a Sunni Muslim sect and he was initially tutored by his maternal uncle, Sheikh Ibrahim Saad Luwemba, the late former Mufti of Uganda.

He started his education at Namakoko Islamic Primary School in Namutumba District, Macahkos Islamic High School and Bilal Muslim Mission in Mombasa. He studied Islamic Philosophy in the city of Hawza of Qom in Iran and later joined Khomeini International University for his Masters and finally received his PhD degree in 1985.

== Career ==
Muwaya worked with the Iranian Embassy in Kenya together with the Iranian ministry of culture and Islamic guidance where he translated the speeches and works of Ali Hosseini Khamenei who was the then president and spiritual leader.

He initiated the establishment of Tawheed Primary School in 1979 which provided free education to majority of its pupils.

He participated in the Nairobi Peace talks due to the desire to return in Uganda and continue with his developments.

He founded the Ahlul Bait Islamic Foundation that watched the construction of more than 24 mosques, 20 primary schools, extension of electricity to Mayuge, digging more than 40 boreholes in the district. It has also provided free medical care, running water, ICT training and employment opportunities to people.

He advocated for the politics of justice and truthfulness hence encouraged people and his son Omar Bongo to join active politics.

== Death ==
He was assassinated on September 26, 2014 on the way back from Komeil prayer ceremony on Thursday night. His funeral was held after Friday prayer in the presence of Ugandan Prime minister, the Police chief of the region, scholars and students and other people. He was laid to rest at the headquarters of Ahlul Bait Islamic in Buyembe village, Bukatuube Sub-couty in Mayuge district.

== Personal life ==
Muwaya died at 60 years of age and left four wives with 12 children.

== See also ==
- Rebecca Kadaga
- Islam in Uganda
- Shi'a Islam
