= Ganai (surname) =

Kashmiri surname

Ganai ( Kashmiri : گنائی ) also spelled as Ganie is a Kashmiri Muslim Surname. Muhammad Din Fauq’s Tarikh-i-Aqwam-i-Kashmir gives a particularly interesting account. As summarized from that work, Ganai was historically an old and respected title, reportedly used by learned people, writers and officials; Tareekh-i-Hassan is cited as explaining Ganai in Persian in the sense of a learned cleric/writer (munshi). The name was already in use around the period of Sultan Zain-ul-Abidin (Budshah). The historical tradition summarized by Fauq divides people bearing the Ganai name into different origins, including descendants attributed to Hazrat Asim bin Hazrat Umar Farooq RAzA. This becomes especially interesting in connection with Baba Dawood Khaki (RA). Historical accounts discussing prominent Ganai scholars include Baba Dawood Khaki, Sheikh Yaqoob Sarfi, Baba Usman Uchap Ganai, Mulla Mohsin Fani Ganai and others, suggesting that Ganai was also associated with important scholarly and religious families of Kashmir. Ganais of Kailashpora Srinagar, a few families in Anantnag known commonly as Khakis and so many others spread across north and south Kashmir. Ganai of Baramulla Ganai Hamam are believed to be part of this lineage. ‘Ganai ba Kashmir daana buud/khuda wand tadbeer wakh ama buud’

[Ganai were fully knowledgeable about Kashmir/in wisdom and intelligence they were masters of the time.]

Ganai cast is also associated Meat Seller or Butcher in Kashmiri Language.
