= Langrial (Gujrat district) =

Langrial لنگڑ يا ل
- Location within Pakistan
- Coordinates: 32.8366°N 74.0432°E
- Country: Pakistan
- Province: Punjab
- District: Gujrat
- Tehsil: Kharian
- P/O: Langrial
- Time zone: UTC+5 (PST)
- Postal code: 50991
- Website: Official website

Langrial (لنگڑيال) is one of the union councils of Kharian Tehsil, Gujrat District in the Punjab province of Pakistan. Langrial is situated on both side of Kotla Arab Ali Khan-old Guliyana road, which goes from Kotla Arab Ali Khan to Guliyana. Langrial is 2 km from Kotla Arab Ali Khan. The town was founded in 1478 by Ratan Langrial who came from Multan.

The headquarters of the Union Council is Langrial, which lies almost midway between Bhimber in Azad Kashmir and Gujrat in Punjab. The village derives its name from the Langrial tribe of Jats. Langrial is one of the most modern and well-developed villages in the region, offering both basic and advanced facilities to its residents. The village has separate government high schools for boys and girls, ensuring quality education opportunities for both genders. In addition, there are two private schools that further contribute to the educational development of the community. Essential public services such as a bank and post office are also available, making daily life convenient for the residents. The village is further supported by a number of qualified doctors and physicians who provide reliable and quality medical treatment to the people.

The hygiene and sanitation conditions in Langrial are commendable. The village has three water treatment plants that supply safe and clean drinking water to the community. Cemented streets add to the cleanliness and accessibility of the area, especially during rainy seasons. The people of Langrial are known for their friendly and cooperative nature, which has created a peaceful and cohesive social environment. Sports and recreational activities are also an important part of village life, with cricket, volleyball, and football being the most popular games enjoyed by the youth and residents alike.

Bangial village, Mandhar, Bhandgran, KaluChak, Rathori, Sheikhpur, Mathana Chak, Chakfazal comprise the Langrial Union Council. Tribe of Jatt, Rajput, Malik, Sayed, Mughal, Mirza are the main castes of the village population.

== See also ==
- Mola Langrial
