= Action at Kalmas =

1916 battle

The action at Kalmas was a battle between the British Army and a group of guerrilla fighters in Afghanistan in 1916.

On 26 September 1916 an action took place at Kalmas, thirty miles north of Nasratabad Sipi, between a small British detachment and some gun-runners moving a convoy of arms towards Afghanistan. 2nd-Lt B. W. Wahl, with 23 sowars of the 23rd Light Cavalry and 36 levies, surprised and attacked the gun-runners. The whole convoy was captured, four of its escort being killed and one taken prisoner. However, Lt Wahl and one sowar of the 23rd Light Cavalry were killed in the cavalry charge which opened the action.
