= Osmany =

Osmany is both a masculine given name, occurring especially in Cuba, and a surname, occurring in South Asia. Notable people with the name include:

== Given name ==
- Osmany Alvarez (born 1963), Cuban racing cyclist
- Osmany Cienfuegos (1931–2025), Cuban politician
- Osmany Juantorena (born 1985), Cuban-born Italian volleyball player
- Osmany Uriarte (born 1995), Cuban volleyball player
- Osmani Urrutia, also Osmany Urrutia (born 1976), Cuban baseball player

== Surname ==
- Laleh Osmany (born 1992), Afghan women's rights activist
- Mufleh R. Osmany, former foreign secretary of Bangladesh and diplomat
- Sarmad Jalal Osmany (1950–2025), Pakistani jurist, chief justice of the Sindh High Court

== See also ==
- Usmani, people with this name
