= Kashmiri Muslims =

Ethnic Kashmiris who practice Islam in the Kashmir Valley

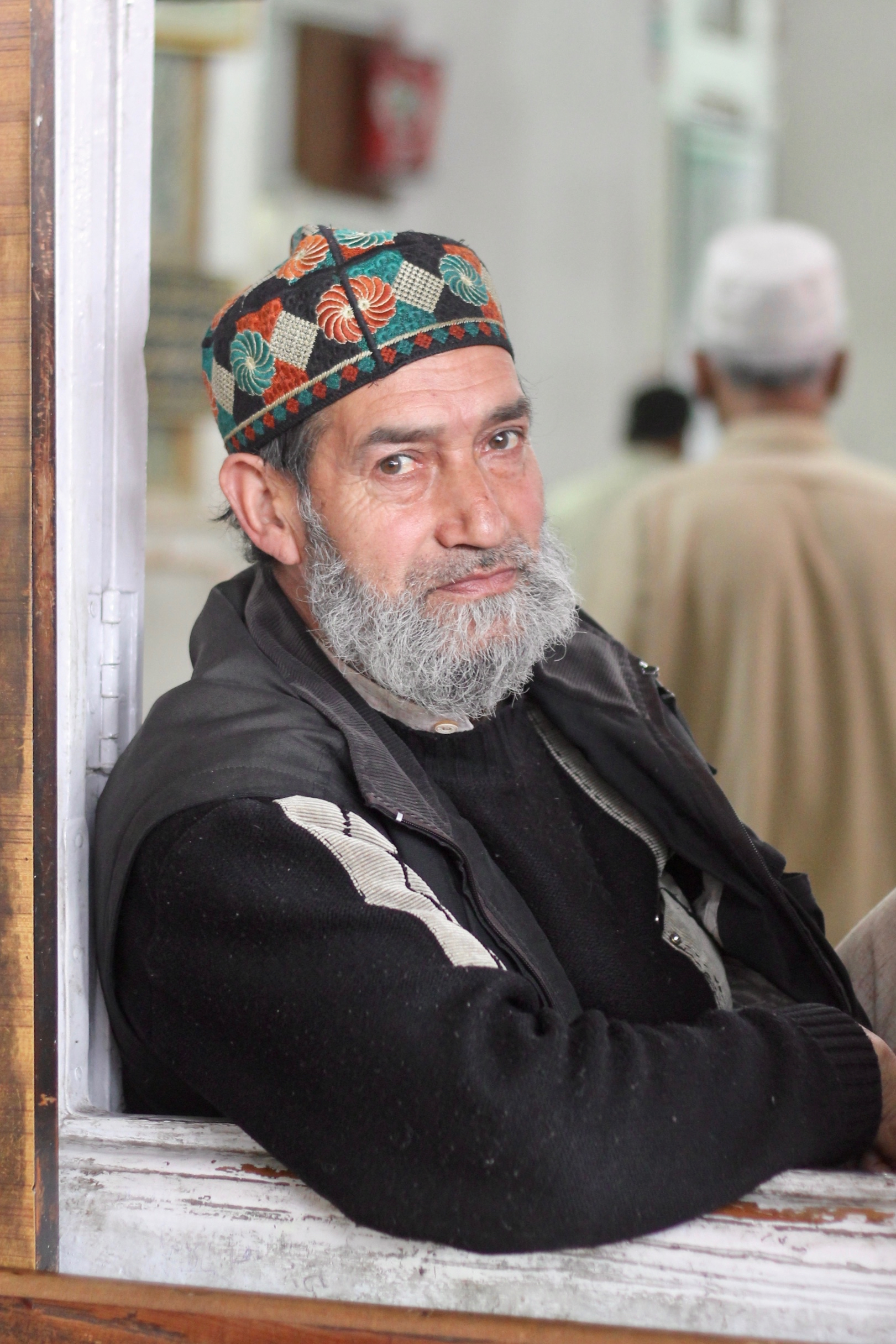

Religions
- Islam (Sunni majority) (Shia minority)

Languages
- Kashmiri, Urdu, English

Kashmiri Muslims are ethnic Kashmiris who practice Islam and are native to the Kashmir Valley of Indian-administered Jammu and Kashmir. The majority of Kashmiri Muslims are Sunni, while Shias form a minority. They refer to themselves as "Koshur" in their mothertongue, Kashmiri.

Currently, the Kashmiri Muslim population is predominantly concentrated in Kashmir Valley. Smaller communities also live in other regions of Jammu and Kashmir. Kashmiri Muslims have similar ethnic roots to the Kashmiri Hindu community. Both Kashmiri Hindus and Muslims trace their descent patrilineally. Property and titles are usually inherited through the male line, but some inheritances may also be accrued through the female lineage. Of the Kashmiri Hindus that were converted to Islam, many largely retained their family names (kram) which indicated their original profession, locality or community.

A small population of Kashmiri Muslims also live in other regions of Jammu and Kashmir. In the Jammu region, they reside in areas surrounding the Kashmir Valley, such as Kishtwar, Bhaderwah, Doda and Ramban, while in Pakistani-administrated Kashmir they can be found in the Neelum and Leepa Valleys. Since 1947, many have also lived in Punjab, Pakistan, migrating from the Kashmir Valley during the Dogra and Sikh rule.

== History ==
Islam started making inroads in Kashmir during the 12th and 13th centuries. The earliest copy of Quran in Kashmir dates back to 1237 AD and was calligraphed by Fateh Ullah Kashmiri who is believed to be a then Kashmiri Islamic scholar.

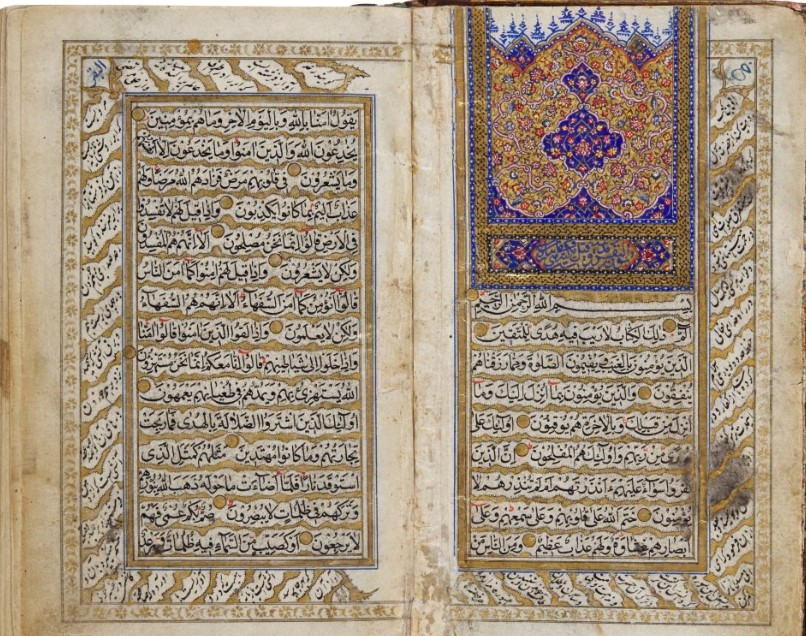
A Quran from Kashmir, dated to around 1821-22.

The first Muslim missionary in Kashmir was Syed Sharaf-ud-Din Abdur Rahman Suhrawardi, popularly known as Bulbul Shah.

He was an extensively traveled preacher, he came to Kashmir during the reign of Raja Suhadeva (1301–20) the king of Lohara dynasty. After Suhadeva was killed by Rinchan and became the ruler, he married Suhadeva's widow Kota Rani and appointed his son as chief, who later he adopted Islam per the advice of Shah Mir. In 1339 Kashmir's throne was captured by Sultan Shahmir who founded the Shah Mir dynasty.

Soon after, according to some accounts, some 10,000 Kashmiri people converted to Islam and hence the seeds of Islam in Kashmir were sown. The spread of Islam among Kashmiris was further boosted by arrival of other Sayyids, most prominent among them being Sayyid Jalal-ud-Din, Sayyid Taj-ud-Din and Sayyid Hussain Simanani.

However, the greatest missionary whose personality wielded the most extraordinary influence in the spread of Islam in Kashmir was Mir Sayyid Ali Hamadani of Hamadan (Persia) popularly known as Shah-i-Hamadan. He belonged to the Kubrawi order of Sufis and came to Kashmir along with seven hundred disciples and helpers. His emphasis was on the Islamization of royal family and the court as a pre-requisite for Islamizing people. This was an important modus operandi adopted by Syed Ali and his disciples. He was of the firm belief that the common masses followed the conduct and culture of their rulers. His disciples established shrines with lodging and langar at many places in Kashmir which served as centers for propagation of Islam. His preaching resulted in a large number of people, including priests of Hinduism and Buddhism and their followers converting to Islam, which became the vastly dominant religion of the Kashmiri masses by the fourteenth century. A greater part of the population converted during the reign of Sultan Sikandar Shah Miri. Mir Sayyid Ali Hamadani's impact in Kashmir was not only confined to religion but had a great say on culture, industry and economy of Kashmir. Spread of shawl making, carpet manufacturing, cloth weaving, etc. gained great prominence by his efforts.

=== Sufi Orders ===
The Rishi order, an indigenous Sufi tradition founded in the 15th century by Sheikh Noor-ud-din Noorani emphasized asceticism, vegetarianism, and communal harmony between Hindus and Muslims. This order significantly influenced Kashmiri Muslim culture, promoting unified practices that integrated local traditions with Islamic teachings.

=== Sikh Empire ===
In 1800, there was a period of drought in the Kashmir Valley, that forced many people to migrate to Punjab. The drought passed by 1820 and many Kashmiris returned home, but others chose to stay in Punjab.

In 1819 Kashmir came under Maharajah Ranjit Singh's Sikh Empire and Sikh rule over Kashmir lasted for 27 years till 1846. These 27 years of Sikh rule saw 10 Governors in Kashmir. Of these 10 Governors five were Hindus, three were Sikhs and two were Muslims. Due to the fact that Kashmiris had suffered under the Afghan rulers, they initially welcomed the Sikh rule. However the Sikhs turned out to be hard taskmasters and their rule was generally considered oppressive. Scholar Christopher Snedden states that the Sikhs exploited Kashmiris regardless of religion.

The Sikhs enacted a number of anti-Muslim policies, subjecting the Muslim majority population of the Valley to a number of hardships in the practice of their religion. The central mosque, Jama Masjid, was closed for 20 years and Muslims were prohibited from issuing the azan (call to prayer). If a Sikh murdered a Hindu the compensation amount allowed was four rupees. However, if a Sikh murdered a Muslim the compensation amount allowed was only two rupees.

During the Sikh rule Kashmir had begun to attract European visitors, several of whom wrote of the abject poverty of the Muslim peasantry and the exorbitant taxes under the Sikhs. According to some contemporary accounts, high taxes had depopulated large tracts of the countryside. Kashmiri histories emphasize the wretchedness of life for common Kashmiris during the Sikh rule. According to them, the peasantry became mired in poverty and migrations of Kashmiri peasants to the plains of Punjab reached high proportions. Several European travelers' accounts from the period testify to and provide evidence for such assertions.

The Sikhs lost their independence with the Battle of Subraon. In 1846 Kashmir came under the rule of Gulab Singh, a Hindu Dogra Maharajah under the British suzerainty.

=== Dogra Regime ===
The 100 year Dogra regime turned out to be a disaster for the Muslim peasantry of Kashmir Valley. Walter Lawrence described the conditions of the Kashmir Valley's peasantry as being 'desperate' and noted that the valley's peasantry attributed their miseries to the Maharajah's deputies rather than the rulers themselves. The state officials apparently kept the rulers from knowing the conditions of the Muslim peasantry in the Kashmir Valley.

Lawrence in particular criticized the state officials who belonged to the Kashmiri Pandit community. Lawrence provided evidence that while many of the Kashmiri Pandit officials may have been ''individually gentle and intelligent, as a body they were cruel and oppressive.'' Scholar Ayesha Jalal states that the Maharajahs nurtured ties with Kashmiri Pandits and their Dogra kinsfolk in Jammu to trample on the rights of their subjects. Christopher Snedden also states that the Kashmiri Muslims were often exploited by the Kashmiri Pandit officials.

Wingate and Lawrence spent many months in rural Kashmir and brought forth the tensions that underlay Kashmiri society, between the interests of the Hindu Kashmiri Pandit community and the numerically influential Kashmiri Muslim cultivators. However, while both acknowledged the oppression of Kashmiri Muslims, the solutions offered by Lawrence and Wingate differed from each other. While both acknowledged the responsibility of the Kashmiri Pandit community in exacerbating the situation of the Muslim cultivating classes, Wingate was far more uncompromising in demanding that the privileges of the Pandit community be eliminated. However, Lawrence proposed to provide relief to Kashmir's cultivating class without eliminating the privileges of the Kashmiri Pandits.

Gawasha Nath Kaul described the poor conditions of the Kashmir Valley's Muslim population in his book Kashmir Then And Now and in it he wrote that 90 percent of Muslim households were mortgaged to Hindu moneylenders. Muslims were non-existent in the State's civil administration and were barred from officer positions in the military.

Prem Nath Bazaz, one of the few Kashmiri Pandits who joined the movement for change, described the poor conditions of the Valley's Muslim population as such:

The poverty of the Muslim masses is appalling. Dressed in rags and barefoot, a Muslim peasant presents the appearance of a starved beggar...Most are landless laborers, working as serfs for absentee landlords.

There was a famine in Kashmir in the late 1870's, with a high death toll. Some authorities suggested that the population of Srinagar had been reduced by half while others estimated a diminution by three-fifths of the entire population of the Kashmir Valley. During the famine of 1877-9 not a single Pandit died of starvation during these annihilative years for the Muslim cultivators, according to reports received by Walter Roper Lawrence. During the famine the office of Prime Minister was held by a Kashmiri Pandit, Wazir Punnu, who is said to have declared that there ''was no real distress and that he wished that no Musulman might be left alive from Srinagar to Rambhan (in Jammu).''

When lands fell fallow temporarily during the famine, Kashmiri Pandits took over substantial tracts of them claiming that they were uncultivated waste. Numerous Kashmiri Muslim cultivators who had left the Kashmir Valley for Punjab to escape the devastation of those years found upon their return that they had been ousted from lands that they had cultivated over generations.

A large number of Muslim Kashmiris migrated from the Kashmir Valley to the Punjab due to conditions in the princely state such as famine, extreme poverty and harsh treatment by the Dogra Hindu regime (according to Prem Nath Bazaz the Kashmiri Muslims faced this harsh treatment because of their religion). According to the 1911 Census there were 177,549 Kashmiri Muslims in the Punjab. With the inclusion of Kashmiri settlements in NWFP this figure rose to 206,180.

== Population ==
The 1921 Census report stated that Kashmiri Muslims formed 31% of the Muslim population of the entire princely state of Jammu and Kashmir. The 1921 Census report also stated that Kashmiri Muslims are sub-divided into numerous sub-castes such as Bhatt, Dhar, Wani etc. The Kashmiri Muslim population in the 1921 Census was recorded as 796,804.

The 1931 Census report also reiterated that the 'Kashmiri Muslim' population occupied the foremost position in the State (other communities in the princely State being Gujjars, Brahmans, Sudhans, Rajputs and Arains etc.). It recorded the Kashmiri Muslim population as 1,352,822. The 1931 Census report explains that the 'phenomenal' increase in the number of Kashmiri Muslims by 556,018 was due to several castes such as Hajjam, Hanji, Sayed and Sheikh being merged into the community.

The 1931 Census report stated that the Bhat, Dar, Ganai, Khan, Lone, Malik, Mir, Pare, Rather, Sheikh, Varrier and Wani were the most major tribes among Kashmiri Muslims. Below are the population figures for the various sub-castes among the Kashmiri Muslim population according to the 1931 Census.

	Ailo	Akhoon	Bhat	Chaupan	Dar	Ganai	Hajam	Hanji	Khan	Khawaja	Lone	Magrey	Malik
Population in entire Jammu and Kashmir State													
Male	5807	2715	90477	6045	64446	32441	10371	2334	18195	3236	34312	4523	31211
Female	4622	2383	77751	5208	53906	26800	8504	1780	15770	2669	30055	4145	26743
Population in Kashmir Province													
Male	4934	2608	80444	5758	61512	31327	10010	2165	18017	2227	29593	4806	17458
Female	4280	2211	69286	5025	51418	25957	8154	1648	15672	1679	25870	3788	15604

	Mir	Pandit	Parray	Pirzada	Raina	Rather	Rishi	Syed	Sheikh	Tantrei	Varrier	Wani	Others
Population in entire Jammu and Kashmir State													
Male	55092	1911	8317	4452	2111	21765	5672	6756	40264	6158	10333	39670	222655
Female	47155	1673	7180	3995	1762	17960	4626	5821	34711	6095	9027	32443	189269
Population in Kashmir Province													
Male	49586	1902	7852	4444	2105	19643	5374	6059	37320	4875	10289	34080	196596
Female	42285	1670	6739	8995	1755	16572	4469	5298	31787	4790	9014	28622	164986

== Diaspora ==
In the early twentieth century, famines and the policies of the Dogra rulers drove many Kashmiri Muslims to flee their native land to Punjab. Kashmiri Muslims constituted an important segment of several Punjabi cities such as Gujranwala, Sialkot, Gujrat, Lahore, Amritsar and Ludhiana. Kashmiris who migrated from Amritsar in 1947 have had a big influence on Lahore's contemporary cuisine and culture. The Kashmiris of Amritsar were more steeped in their Kashmiri culture than the Kashmiris of Lahore. An exclusive research conducted by the "Jang Group and Geo Television Network" showed that the Kashmiri community had been involved in spearheading the power politics of Lahore district since 1947.

Notable members of the Kashmiri Muslim diaspora in Punjab include Pakistan's former Prime Minister Nawaz Sharif (paternal ancestry from Anantnag), Finance Minister Ishaq Dar, politician Khawaja Asif, and former Chief Justice Lahore High Court Khawaja Muhammad Sharif . Another notable member of the Kashmiri Muslim diaspora in Punjab was Muhammad Iqbal (who took pride in his Brahman ancestry and whose poetry displayed a keen sense of belonging to the Kashmir Valley). Another famous proud Kashmiri writer from Punjab was Saadat Hasan Manto.

According to the 1921 Census the total Kashmiri population in Punjab was 169,761. However, the Census report stated that only 3% of Kashmiris settled in Punjab retained their Kashmiri language. The number of people speaking Kashmiri in 1901 was 8,523 but had decreased to 7,190 in 1911. By 1921 the number of people speaking Kashmiri in Punjab had fallen to 4,690. The 1921 Census report stated that this fact showed that the Kashmiris who had settled in Punjab had adopted the Punjabi language of their neighbors. In contrast, the 1881 Census of Punjab had shown that there were 49,534 speakers of the Kashmiri language in the Punjab. The 1881 Census had recorded the number of Kashmiris in the Punjab as 179,020 while the 1891 Census recorded the Kashmiri population as 225,307 but the number of Kashmiri speakers recorded in the 1891 Census was 28,415.

Scholar Ayesha Jalal states that Kashmiris faced discrimination in the Punjab as well. Kashmiris settled for generations in the Punjab were unable to own land, including the family of Muhammad Iqbal. Scholar Chitralekha Zutshi states that Kashmiri Muslims settled in the Punjab retained emotional and familial links to Kashmir and felt obliged to struggle for the freedom of their brethren in the Valley.
