= Chumra (Judaism) =

Exceeding a halakhic requirement

A chumra (pronounced [χuˈmʁa]; Hebrew: חוּמרָה; pl. חוּמרוֹת, ḥumrôt) is a prohibition or obligation in the practice of Judaism that exceeds the bare minimum required by Halakha (Jewish law). One who imposes a chumra on oneself is said to be maḥmir (מַחמִיר, 'stringent') vis-à-vis the given practice.

A chumra can be adopted by an individual or an entire Jewish community. Early allusions to chumrot are found in the Talmud, but the meaning and application thereof have evolved since the Talmudic era. After a chumra has been observed for generations, it may take on the status of a minhag (מִנְהָג, 'custom'), thus becoming a halakhically binding requirement for religious Jews from families or communities that initially adopted the chumra.

== Types ==
=== Safeguards ===
One form of chumra is a precaution to help avoid transgressing Halakha, or else a way of keeping those who have taken on the stringency separate from those who have not. This follows the recommendation made by the Great Assembly, recorded in Pirkei Avot 1:1 of the Mishnah, for Torah scholars to "make a fence around the Torah", which the Rabbis considered implied by Leviticus 18:30. Nevertheless, Nachmanides urged his audience to understand that such "safeguards" were of Rabbinic origin, not Tanakhic origin.

=== Stringencies ===
A second meaning of chumra is simply a stricter interpretation of a halakhic ruling when two or more interpretations exist. Those who adopt greater stringency than the normative Halakha do not feel they are adding to the Halakha. Instead, they think they are following the baseline requirement (if the strict interpretation is correct) or at least 'covering their bases' (if it is impossible to determine whether the strict or lenient opinion is correct). Nevertheless, such stringency may be seen as adding to Halakha by someone who believes the lenient—or kulah (קוּלָה, qŭlaʾ, 'leniency')—interpretation is correct. In many cases, a rule followed by the majority (or even the totality) of halakhically observant Jews today is a stringency compared with more lenient rabbinic opinions that have existed in the past or continue to exist today.

=== Voluntary observance ===
Some individuals may adopt strict practices, even if they are not mandated, to prevent transgression, believing these practices carry spiritual or devotional significance. This approach is associated with Nachmanides, who, in his commentary on Leviticus 19:2, posited that individuals should conduct themselves in this manner as a general principle, steering clear of excessive physicality even when operating within the law, as a method for attaining holiness.

== Risks and dangers ==
Adopting a chumra is not necessarily considered a positive thing in Judaism. Adopting an unnecessary chumra can lead to negative consequences, according to Hershey Friedman of CUNY Brooklyn College, including:

- An "attitude of imprecision", which might lead one to become improperly lenient in other circumstances;
- Implicit disrespect or rejection of Halakha;
- Leniency in another area, the result being that one's attempt at stringency can cause violation of the law;
- Arrogance, as well as the embarrassment of loved ones;
- Implicit rejection of the practice of previous generations that did not prescribe the stringency;
- The imposition of stringency on another individual

For these reasons, the Talmud and other sources discouraged many types of chumra.

== Related terms ==
- lifnim meshurat hadin (beyond the letter of the law)
- midat chassidut (a pious practice)
- hiddur mitzvah (beautifying the commandment)

== See also ==
- Frum
- Khumra (Islam)
- Marit ayin
