= Bilal Muslim Mission =

The Bilal Muslim Mission is an international Shi'a twelver organization, established in East Africa on December 25, 1964 through the efforts of Sayyid Saeed Akhtar Rizvi, Hussein Nasser Walji and other dedicated volunteers. The organization is named after Bilal ibn Ribah, the famous Ethiopian Sahabi.

== History ==
When the organization was established, there were hardly any Shi'a communities of native African origin in the Sub-Saharan Africa. Now, there are several.

The website of their Tanzania branch writes:

When past Chairman Ebrahim Hussein Sheriff went to see Ayatullah Uzama Seyid Muhsin Al-Hakim A.M. in early Sixtys: Ayatullah asked Haji Ebrahim “How long are you people in East Africa?” to which Haji-Ebrahim replied “About a hundred years.” “How many Africans have accepted Mazhabe Haq?” Was the next question. To which the reply was “none”. Immediately Agha asked Haji Ebrahim that “Will these people not complain on Youmal Hashr that you knew the right path, yet you did not show them?” Allamah Sayyid Saeed Akhtar Rizvi conceived a plan in 1962, for propagating Islam. His plan was proposed and approved at the triennial Conference of the Supreme Council of Africa Federation of K.S.I Jamaats of Africa in Tanga in 1964. and became the Bilal Muslim Mission. BILAL MUSLIM MISSION OF TANZANIA was established in 1968 and a sister organization BILAL MUSLIM MISSION OF KENYA was incorporated in 1971 and Allamah Sayyid Saeed Akhtar Rizvi became Chief Missionary.

They are now part of the World Federation of KSI Muslim Communities, an international umbrella organization that was formed in the 1976, after 1500 Shi'a twelver families emigrated from East Africa to the United Kingdom and Canada.

The carried out missionary efforts aimed at both non-Muslims and Sunni Muslims, and their efforts intensified after the Iranian Revolution.

In the late 1970s, the Bilal Muslim Mission and World Organization for Islamic Services had sent many books to America, by July 1977, about 5,770 books and booklets had been mailed out.

The Bilal Muslim Mission had been able to accomplished at lot in its objective of spreading the true teaching of Islam, through the hard work of its dedicated founders. This was achieved with very limited means and resources. Main source of spreading the true faith was person to person or through correspondence and publication of books and its dissemination. People from Guyana in South America to Poland in Europe and from Malaysia to West Africa benefitted and embraced the true Islam.

At present, 2017, the Bilal Muslim Mission of Tanzania a still trying to get its rhythm since the void left by the death of Allama Sayyid Saeed Aktar Rizvi.

The Bilal Muslim Mission is recognized by the Ministry of Overseas Indian Affairs.

== Member organizations ==
- Bilal Muslim Mission of Kenya – kenbilal.org
- Bilal Muslim Mission of Tanzania – bilaltz.org
- Bilal Muslim Mission Moshi Branch – bilalmoshi.com
- Bilal Muslim Mission of Americas – bilalmma.org
- Bilal Muslim Mission of Scandinavia – immi.se (in Swedish)

== Publications ==
Bi-monthly magazines:

- Sauti ya Bilal (The Voice of Bilal) to cater for the Swahili readers, since 1965.
- 'The light' which has global readership, since March, 1963. This magazines also spawned a book named “Muhammad is the Last Prophet”.

Books: The Mission has more than 108 (57 English, 51 Swahili) books written on a wide range of Islamic topics.

- Music and its Effects
- A Few Questions and Answers. Bilal Muslim Mission of Kenya.
- A Lecture On Nahju 'l-Balãghah. Bilal Muslim Mission of Tanzania. 2001. ISBN 9789987620180.
- Day of Judgement. Bilal Muslim Mission of Tanzania. 1998. ISBN 9789987620029.
- Elements of Islamic Studies. Bilal Muslim Mission of Tanzania. 1986. ISBN 9789976956054.
- Fadak. Bilal Muslim Mission of Tanzania. January 1999.
- Family Life of Islam. Bilal Muslim Mission of Tanzania. 1988. ISBN 9789976956399.
- Fast. Bilal Muslim Mission of Tanzania. 1988. ISBN 9789976956313.
- Four Californian Lectures. Bilal Muslim Mission of Tanzania. 1989. ISBN 9789976956405.
- God : An Islamic Perspective. Bilal Muslim Mission of Tanzania. 1994. ISBN 9789976956801.
- Hijab: The Dress of Modesty in Islam. Bilal Muslim Mission of Tanzania. 1992. ISBN 9789976956740.
- Imamate: The vicegerency of the Holy Prophet. Bilal Muslim Mission of Tanzania. 1988. ISBN 9789976956139.
- In defense of Islamic Laws: Four Memoranda on various Personal Laws of Islam. Bilal Muslim Mission of Tanzania. 2007.
- Inner Voice. Bilal Muslim Mission of Tanzania. 1989. ISBN 9789976956450.
- Islam. Bilal Muslim Mission of Tanzania. January 1977.
- Meaning and Origin of Shi'ism. Islamic Education & Information Centre.
- Muhammad is the Last Prophet. Bilal Muslim Mission of Tanzania. 1988. ISBN 9789976956283.
- Need of Religion. Bilal Muslim Mission of Tanzania. 1988. ISBN 9789976956375.
- Pork. Bilal Muslim Mission of Tanzania. 1975. ISBN 9789976956160.
- Prophecies about Occultation of Imam al-Mahdi (a.s.). Bilal Muslim Mission of Tanzania. ISBN 9789987620234.
- Prophecies about the Holy Prophet of Islam in Hindu, Christian, Jewish & Parsi Scriptures. Bilal Muslim Mission of Tanzania. ISBN 9789987620210.
- Prophethood. Bilal Muslim Mission of Tanzania. 1987. ISBN 9789976956177.
- Sects of Islam. World Islamic Network.
- Taqiyah. Bilal Muslim Mission of Tanzania. 1992. ISBN 9789976956733.
- The Holy Prophet. Bilal Muslim Mission of Tanzania. 1975. ISBN 9789976956320.
- The Ideal Islamic Government. Bilal Muslim Mission of Tanzania. 1990. ISBN 9789976956634.
- The Justice of God. Bilal Muslim Mission of Tanzania. 1992. ISBN 9789976956641.
- The Quran and Hadith. Bilal Muslim Mission of Tanzania. 1975. ISBN 9789976956870.
- The Quran: Its Protection from Alteration. Bilal Muslim Mission of Americas. ISBN 0964987813.
- Wahhabis Fitna Exposed. Bilal Muslim Mission of Tanzania. 1996. ISBN 9789976956764.
- What a Muslim Should Know and Believe. Bilal Muslim Mission of Tanzania. January 1987. ISBN 9789976956061.
- Your Questions Answered volume I. Bilal Muslim Mission of Tanzania. January 1975.
- Your Questions Answered volume II. Bilal Muslim Mission of Tanzania.
- Your Questions Answered volume III. Bilal Muslim Mission of Tanzania.
- Your Questions Answered volume III. Bilal Muslim Mission of Tanzania.
- Your Questions Answered volume V. Bilal Muslim Mission of Tanzania. ISBN 9789976956672.
- Your Questions Answered volume VI. Bilal Muslim Mission of Tanzania. ISBN 9789976956900.
- Your Questions Answered volume VII. Bilal Muslim Mission of Tanzania. ISBN 9789987620074.
- Munajaat of Amirul Mumineen Ali ibn Abi Talib (a.s.). Bilal Muslim Mission of Tanzania.
- The Charter of Rights. Bilal Muslim Mission of Tanzania. ISBN 9789987620050.
- The Return of al-Mahdi. Bilal Muslim Mission of Tanzania. 1996. ISBN 9789976956962.
- On to the Right Path. Bilal Muslim Mission of Tanzania. 1999. ISBN 9789987620081.
- Bustani ya Elimu. Bilal Muslim Mission of Tanzania. January 2000. ISBN 9789976956665.
- The Light. - Bi Monthly English Magazine first started in 1963. Bilal Muslim Mission of Tanzania
- Haja ya Dini. Bilal Muslim Mission of Tanzania
- The Return of Al_Mehdi. Bilal Muslim Mission of Tanzania
- Justice of God. Bilal Muslim Mission of Tanzania
