= Barazani =

Barazani is a Baloch tribe living in Iranian province Sistan and Baluchistan.

== See also ==
- Baloch people
- Baloch tribes
- Baluchistan
- Barzani (disambiguation)

== Sources ==
- Countrystudies.us: Iran - Baluchis
- MNSU,edu: Baluchi
