= Varrier =

Varrier is a surname found amongst people in Jammu and Kashmir in India, meaning prosperous in Kashmiri. Varrier is a Kashmiri Muslim name and was the name of the leaders in Islamabad, now known as Anantnag. The surname belonged to the wealthy merchants that had come from Iran for trade and the leaders of the area during the Mughal Empire. Even in present day, Varriers own much of the property in Anantnag, Srinagar, and Uri in India.

Khurshid Drabu Varrier, known as Khurshid Drabu, was a notable Varrier who was the first Muslim to be a judge in Britain, serving on immigration and asylum tribunals. He also played first-class cricket for the Jammu and Kashmir cricket team from 1963 to 1970 as an opening batsman.
