= Hussein Nasser Walji =

Hussein Nasser Walji (3 September 1920 – 17 December 2005) was a founding member of the Bilal Muslim Mission. He previously had been president of a jamaat in Dar-es-Salaam, Tanzania, during the expansion of the community in the 1960s.

== Personal life ==
Walji's father died when he was young. Hussein Nasser moved to Canada and never returned to Tanzania, and died in 2005.
