= Bahadur Khan Bangulzai =

Bangulzai of Balochistan

Sardar Bahadur Khan Bangulzai
- Died: 2006

Sardar Bahadur Khan Bangulzai was the former chief of the Bangulzai of Balochistan. He was a member of the Provincial Assembly of Balochistan and served as provincial minister for education. Sardar Bangulzai was part of a jirga that helped to resolve a 4-year blood feud between rival clans of the Lango tribe in 2002. He began his career in the 1970s and remained a member of the assembly until his death on 20 August 2006 at the age of 87. He was buried in his ancestral graveyard in Splinji.

His son and successor Sardar Kamal Khan Bangulzai is the Nazim (governor) of Mastung District.
