= Sa'id Akhtar Rizvi =

Allamah Sayyid Sayyid Sa'eed Akhtar Rizvi
- سيد سعيد اختر رضوي

Personal life
- Born: 5 January 1927 Siwan district, Bihar
- Died: 20 June 2002 (aged 75) Dar es Salam, Tanzania
- Resting place: Dar es Salaam, Tanzania
- Home town: Gopalpur, Siwan, Bihar, India
- Spouse: Roshan Jahan and Fatima Zahra
- Children: 1. Qaisar Jahan; 2. Ali Imam 3. Muhammad 4. Zaki Imam 5. Masud Akhtar 6. Zainab; 7. Mukhtar Saeed (Murtaza)
- Parent: Father: Maulānā Ḥakīm Sayyid Abul Ḥasan Rizvi Mother: Ṣiddīqah Khātūn
- Citizenship: Indo-Tanzanian
- Known for: Chief Missionary of Bilal Muslim Mission
- Occupation: Islamic scholar
- Website: Allamah Rizvi Foundation

Religious life
- Religion: Islam
- Denomination: Shia
- Jurisprudence: Jafari (Usuli)
- Creed: Twelver

Sayyid Sa‘eed Akhtar Rizvi (Urdu: سيد سعيد اختر رضوي) (January 5, 1927 - June 20, 2002) was an Indian born, Twelver Shī‘ah scholar, who established the Bilal Muslim Mission in East Africa to spread the Twelver creed. He was granted authorizations (Arabic: اجازة) by fourteen Grand Ayatollahs for Hadith, Ahkam, and Fiqh.

== Biography ==
Sayyid Saeed Akhtar Rizvi was born in Ushri, Saran district, Bihar, India, in 1927. His father, Sayyid Abul Hassan Rizvi, was a religious scholar. Rizvi had five sons and two daughters. His second eldest son, Sayyid Muhammad Rizvi, resides in Toronto, Ontario, Canada, where he serves as the Imam of the Islamic Shia Ithna‘asheri Jamaat (ISIJ).

Rizvi was fluent in Urdu, English, Arabic, Persian, and Swahili. He was also familiar with Hindi and Gujarati.

In 1959, Rizvi was appointed as an Islamic scholar (Arabic: 'alim) in Lindi, Tanzania. In 1962, he developed a plan for promoting Islam, which was proposed and approved at the triennial conference of the Supreme Council of the Africa Federation of K.S.I. Jamaats of Africa in Tanga in 1964. This initiative led to the establishment of the Bilal Muslim Mission.

Rizvi was transferred from Arusha to Dar es Salaam, where the Bilal Muslim Mission of Tanzania was officially registered in 1968. The Bilal Muslim Mission of Kenya was founded in 1971. Through this mission, Rizvi introduced correspondence courses in Islamic studies in both English and Swahili. He also traveled and lectured to university students in Africa, Europe, Canada, and the United States.

Rizvi died in Dar es Salaam. His funeral was attended by officials and scholars from several countries. Two scouts carrying black flags accompanied the cortege to the burial site. The Islamic funeral prayer (Salat al-Mayyit) was led by his son, Muhammad Rizvi.

Rizvi authored over 140 books, some of which have been translated into multiple languages.

The Bilal Muslim Mission contributed to the spread of Islamic teachings through publications, correspondence, and personal outreach. Its work reached individuals in regions including Guyana in South America, Poland in Europe, Malaysia, and West Africa.

At the time of Rizvi's death, according to PEW Research, there were approximately two million Shias in Tanzania.

== Bibliography ==
=== As author ===
- A Few Questions and Answers. Bilal Muslim Mission of Kenya.
- A Lecture On Nahju 'l-Balãghah. Bilal Muslim Mission of Tanzania. 2001. ISBN 9789987620180.
- Day of Judgement. Bilal Muslim Mission of Tanzania. 1998. ISBN 9789987620029.
- Elements of Islamic Studies. Bilal Muslim Mission of Tanzania. 1986. ISBN 9789976956054.
- Fadak. Bilal Muslim Mission of Tanzania. January 1999.
- Family Life of Islam. Bilal Muslim Mission of Tanzania. 1988. ISBN 9789976956399.
- Fast. Bilal Muslim Mission of Tanzania. 1988. ISBN 9789976956313.
- Four Californian Lectures. Bilal Muslim Mission of Tanzania. 1989. ISBN 9789976956405.
- God : An Islamic Perspective. Bilal Muslim Mission of Tanzania. 1994. ISBN 9789976956801.
- Hijab: The Dress of Modesty in Islam. Bilal Muslim Mission of Tanzania. 1992. ISBN 9789976956740.
- Imamate: The vicegerency of the Holy Prophet. Bilal Muslim Mission of Tanzania. 1988. ISBN 9789976956139.
- In defense of Islamic Laws: Four Memoranda on various Personal Laws of Islam. Bilal Muslim Mission of Tanzania. 2007.
- Inner Voice. Bilal Muslim Mission of Tanzania. 1989. ISBN 9789976956450.
- Islam. Bilal Muslim Mission of Tanzania. January 1977.
- Meaning and Origin of Shi'ism. Islamic Education & Information Centre.
- Muhammad is the Last Prophet. Bilal Muslim Mission of Tanzania. 1988. ISBN 9789976956283.
- Need of Religion. Bilal Muslim Mission of Tanzania. 1988. ISBN 9789976956375.
- Pork. Bilal Muslim Mission of Tanzania. 1975. ISBN 9789976956160.
- Prophecies about Occultation of Imam al-Mahdi (a.s.). Bilal Muslim Mission of Tanzania. ISBN 9789987620234.
- Prophecies about the Holy Prophet of Islam in Hindu, Christian, Jewish & Parsi Scriptures. Bilal Muslim Mission of Tanzania. ISBN 9789987620210.
- Prophethood. Bilal Muslim Mission of Tanzania. 1987. ISBN 9789976956177.
- Sects of Islam. World Islamic Network.
- Taqiyah. Bilal Muslim Mission of Tanzania. 1992. ISBN 9789976956733.
- The Holy Prophet. Bilal Muslim Mission of Tanzania. 1975. ISBN 9789976956320.
- The Ideal Islamic Government. Bilal Muslim Mission of Tanzania. 1990. ISBN 9789976956634.
- The Justice of God. Bilal Muslim Mission of Tanzania. 1992. ISBN 9789976956641.
- The Quran and Hadith. Bilal Muslim Mission of Tanzania. 1975. ISBN 9789976956870.
- The Quran: Its Protection from Alteration. Bilal Muslim Mission of Americas. ISBN 0964987813.
- Wahhabis Fitna Exposed. Bilal Muslim Mission of Tanzania. 1996. ISBN 9789976956764.
- What a Muslim Should Know and Believe. Bilal Muslim Mission of Tanzania. January 1987. ISBN 9789976956061.
- Your Questions Answered volume I. Bilal Muslim Mission of Tanzania. January 1975.
- Your Questions Answered volume II. Bilal Muslim Mission of Tanzania.
- Your Questions Answered volume III. Bilal Muslim Mission of Tanzania.
- Your Questions Answered volume III. Bilal Muslim Mission of Tanzania.
- Your Questions Answered volume V. Bilal Muslim Mission of Tanzania. ISBN 9789976956672.
- Your Questions Answered volume VI. Bilal Muslim Mission of Tanzania. ISBN 9789976956900.
- Your Questions Answered volume VII. Bilal Muslim Mission of Tanzania. ISBN 9789987620074.
- اتمام حجت. المعارف پبلیکیشن، گوپالپور.
- A History of the Shi’a People. Al-Maarif Foundation
- Haja ya Dini. Bilal Muslim Mission of Tanzania
- Understanding Karbala. Ansariyan Publications - Qum
- Slavery - From Islamic and Christian Perspectives. Bilal Muslim Mission of Tanzania
- Alcohol. WOFIS
- Completion of Argument. Ansariyan Publication, Qum

=== As translator ===
- Extracts from Correspondence between A Muslim and A Christian. World Organization for Islamic Services. 1980.
- Munajaat of Amirul Mumineen Ali ibn Abi Talib (a.s.). Bilal Muslim Mission of Tanzania.
- The Charter of Rights. Bilal Muslim Mission of Tanzania. ISBN 9789987620050.
- The Return of al-Mahdi. Bilal Muslim Mission of Tanzania. 1996. ISBN 9789976956962.
- Al-Mizan An Exegesis of the Quran - Volume 1. WORLD ORGANIZATION FOR ISLAMIC SERVICES (WOFIS)
- Al-Mizan An Exegesis of the Quran - Volume 2. WORLD ORGANIZATION FOR ISLAMIC SERVICES (WOFIS)
- Al-Mizan An Exegesis of the Quran - Volume 3. WORLD ORGANIZATION FOR ISLAMIC SERVICES (WOFIS)
- Al-Mizan An Exegesis of the Quran - Volume 4. WORLD ORGANIZATION FOR ISLAMIC SERVICES (WOFIS)
- Al-Mizan An Exegesis of the Quran - Volume 5. WORLD ORGANIZATION FOR ISLAMIC SERVICES (WOFIS)
- Al-Mizan An Exegesis of the Quran - Volume 6. WORLD ORGANIZATION FOR ISLAMIC SERVICES (WOFIS)
- Al-Mizan An Exegesis of the Quran - Volume 7. WORLD ORGANIZATION FOR ISLAMIC SERVICES (WOFIS)
- Al-Mizan An Exegesis of the Quran - Volume 8. WORLD ORGANIZATION FOR ISLAMIC SERVICES (WOFIS)
- Al-Mizan An Exegesis of the Quran - Volume 9. WORLD ORGANIZATION FOR ISLAMIC SERVICES (WOFIS)
- Al-Mizan An Exegesis of the Quran - Volume 10. WORLD ORGANIZATION FOR ISLAMIC SERVICES (WOFIS)
- Al-Mizan An Exegesis of the Quran - Volume 11. WORLD ORGANIZATION FOR ISLAMIC SERVICES (WOFIS)
- Al-Mizan An Exegesis of the Quran - Volume 12. WORLD ORGANIZATION FOR ISLAMIC SERVICES (WOFIS)
- Al-Mizan An Exegesis of the Quran - Volume 13. WORLD ORGANIZATION FOR ISLAMIC SERVICES (WOFIS)

=== As editor ===
- On to the Right Path. Bilal Muslim Mission of Tanzania. 1999. ISBN 9789987620081.
- Bustani ya Elimu. Bilal Muslim Mission of Tanzania. January 2000. ISBN 9789976956665.
- The Light. - Bi Monthly English Magazine first started in 1963. Bilal Muslim Mission of Tanzania

=== Journal articles ===
- "Imam Hasan, The Myth of his Divorces". Al-Serat Journal. 4 (3).
- "Martyrdom of Imam Husayn and the Muslim and Jewish Calendars". Al-Serat Journal. 6 (3–4).
- "The Illustrious Period of the Imamate of Imam Zayn al-'Abidin". Al-Serat Journal. 5 (3–4).
- "The Scholarly Jihad of the Imams - 95 - 148 A.H Part One". Al-Serat Journal. 9 (1–2).
- "The Scholarly Jihad of the Imams - 95 - 148 A.H Part Two". Al-Serat Journal. 9 (1–2).
- "The Fast of Ashura". Al-Serat Journal. 8 (3–4).
- "Imam Ali Ibn Abi Talib (a.s.) and Bayah to Shaykhain".

== See also ==
- Rizvi
- List of Islamic scholars
- Bilal Muslim Mission of Tanzania

== Suggested reading ==
- Outline of Shi'a Ithna-ashari History in East Africa by Marhum Mulla Asgharali M.M. Jaffer
