= Pakistani name =

Pakistani names reflect the country's diverse linguistic, ethnic and religious heritage. Most Pakistani names are derived from Arabic, Persian and Turkic origins, owing to the strong influence of Islam in the region.

In contrast to Western naming systems, family names are not always fixed or inherited. Instead, names in Pakistan may follow patronymic or tribal structures, or use honorific titles such as Syed, Sheikh, Malik, Khawaja, and Khan.

Names may also indicate lineage, geographic origin, or ancestral profession, such as Bukhari (from Bukhara), Qureshi (descendant of the Quraysh tribe), or Butt (from the Kashmiri Butt clan).

While many Pakistanis use only given names in daily life, tribal or ancestral identifiers are often included in formal and legal documents such as NADRA identity cards and passports.

== Given names ==
In Pakistan, children are typically given one or two given names at birth, though occasionally three names may be used. One of the given names may be chosen as the person's most called name, which is used in daily life and informal settings.

For Muslim males, it is common to include Muhammad as the first given name, in honour of the Islamic prophet, though this is often not the most called name due to its widespread use. Females are usually given up to two names, which serve as both their full and most called names in most contexts.

Given names may also carry religious or cultural significance. Names can reference prophets, saints, virtues, or desirable qualities, such as Imran, Ayesha, Zainab, or Ali. Occasionally, names are derived from geography or historical figures, though these are less common.

In daily use, the given name is the primary identifier, and family or tribal names are not used when addressing a person informally. This practice reinforces the importance of given names in social interactions in Pakistan.

== Full name ==
Unlike in many Western countries, or countries with predominant European influence, there is no single standard for writing a full name in Pakistan. Most commonly, a person's full name consists of their given name followed by their father's most called name. Tribal or honorific titles may also be included, either as a prefix or, more often today, as a suffix. Common honorifics and titles include Syed, Sheikh, Malik, Khawaja, and Khan. Less frequently, the tribal or ancestral name may be appended to the given names, particularly in formal or legal contexts.

For females, tribal or ancestral identifiers are rarely used in daily life, though they may appear in formal records. Married women sometimes adopt their husband's most called name instead of their father's in official documents.

In official paperwork, such as NADRA identity cards, passports, or educational certificates, a person's identity is established by listing both their full name and their father's or husband's name, typically in the format: A son/daughter/wife of B. This practice ensures clarity in legal, civil, and governmental records.

While family or tribal names may appear in official documents, they are rarely used when addressing someone. Instead, the given name remains the primary identifier in most social and informal settings.

In many cases, the father's given name is used as a last name for children rather than an inherited family name. For example, if a father is "Shoukat Ali", his son may be named "Faisal Shoukat" . This practice is common in rural or less urbanised areas, and contributes to the variability of surnames across Pakistan.

Recent reforms in Pakistan have begun including the mother's name alongside the father's in official documents such as passports, recognising both parents in identity verification.

== Regional and ethnic variations ==
Pakistani names reflect the country's diverse ethnic and regional heritage. Names may indicate Arab ancestry, such as Sheikh, Siddiqui, Abbasi, Syed, Zaidi, and Khawaja; Afghan ancestry, such as Durrani, Yousafzai, Afridi, and Khattak; Mughal or Turkic ancestry, including Mughal, Baig, and Pasha surnames.

Tribal and clan names are widely used across Pakistan. Punjabi clans may have surnames like Malik, Chaudhry, or Bhatti, Sindhi tribes may use Soomro or Talpur, Pashtun tribes use identifiers such as Afridi, Yousafzai, and Wazir, while Baloch families often carry names like Marri, Mengal, or Raisani.

Many Pakistanis also have family names of Indian subcontinent origin, particularly those whose families migrated during the 1947 partition. These include surnames like Barelvi, Lakhnavi, Delhvi, Bilgrami, and various Rajput surnames such as Chauhan, Rathore, Parmar, and Janjua. These names often preserve ancestral links to specific regions, towns, or clans in pre-partition India.

In everyday interactions, Pakistanis generally use their given names rather than surnames, even in professional or formal contexts. Honorifics and titles, including Mr., Mrs., Dr., Professor, or Haji, are commonly placed before the given name to convey respect. Tribal, familial, or ancestral identifiers may also be used in rural or conservative settings.

While caste is not formally recognised in Pakistan, it influences social and cultural practices, particularly in rural communities and among diaspora populations.

== See also ==
- List of Pakistani family names
- Honorifics in Pakistan
