= Bangial, Gujrat =

Village in Punjab, Pakistan

Bangial is a village in the Langrial union council of Kharian Tehsil, Gujrat District, in the Punjab province of Pakistan. It is located at 32°49′35″N 74°02′12″E.
