= Dodai =

- Locality
- Location in SomaliLand.
- Coordinates: 8°47′09″N 48°14′55″E
- Country: Somaliland
- Region: Sool
- District: Taleh District
- Time zone: UTC+3 (EAT)

Dodai, also called Doddi or Dodhais, is a border-locality in the Sool region of Somaliland, opposite to Geida Debabo which is across the border in the Garowe District in Somalia.

== Overview ==
British parliamentarian Leopard Amery in 1920 described the locality as a "waterhole ... close to the Italian frontier."

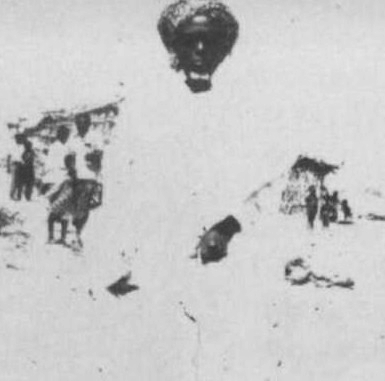
Dervish Speaker Aw Abdille Ibrahim

On the 12th of February 1920, Dodai was the final refuge of the last independent figures of the Dervish inner circle in their traditional territories of the Nugaal before their escape into Abyssinia. This inner circle of Dervishes included Abshir Dhoore, Cismaan Boos, the Sayid himself and two of his sisters. The presence of Aw Abdille Ibraahiim at their destination at the Shebelle tributary suggests he may have been the third male.

== See also ==
- Administrative divisions of Somaliland
- Regions of Somaliland
- Districts of Somaliland
- Somalia–Somaliland border
