= Ziauddin Rizvi =

Pakistani cleric (1958–2005)

Shaheed Agha Ziauddin Rizvi (Urdu: شہید آغا ضیاء الدین رضوی; died 2005) was a Pakistani Shi'a cleric born in Gilgit, Baltistan in a religious family. He completed his early schooling in Gilgit; later moving to Lahore, and afterwards Iran for higher religious education. He also visited the UK and Kuwait as a member of a Tablighi delegation in the early 1980s.

He rose to prominence in 1990 after playing an important role in restoring peace and reconciliation after the sectarian attack by terrorists, which left over 300 people dead. He served as Imam of Friday prayers at Markazi Jamia Imamia Masjid Gilgit and head of shia community of Gilgit-Baltistan for 15 years until his death.

He was attacked by terrorists on January 8, 2005 in an attack in which three of his bodyguards were killed. He was transferred to a Combined Military Hospital Rawalpindi via helicopter. He martyred at CMH Rawalpindi on January 13, 2005 at 10:00 PST.
