= Batwal =

Hindu caste

The Batwal are a Hindu caste found in the state of Jammu and Kashmir, Himachal Pradesh, Punjab, Haryana and Rajasthan in India.In the term of confidential remarking they may ranked bellow the agro-martial tribes of Punjab, who are mostly attributed as Jatt (zamindar)in present classification including rest of others.

== History ==
In the Jammu region, from where the Punjab Batwal claim to have originated, The Batwal are found mainly in Kathua, Jammu and Udhampur, Pathankot, Gurdaspur, Batala, Amritsar, Jalandhar, chandigarh, Haryana, Dabwali, Kaithal, Mumbai, Surat and Ahmadabad in Gujrat, Kolkata.

== Present Circumstances ==
Like other neighbouring Hindu communities, the Batwal are striucly exogamous, never marrying within the clan. The major clans include the Basae, a name derived from the Beas River and meaning those settled along the banks of that river, and the Chariya, i.e. those who were inhabitants of Shimla. Other clans include the Sindhi, Sandhu or Sundha, Shinde, Thage, Basse Kaith, Kalanoria, Lahoria, Mandee, Nakhotra, Nandan, Sajotra and Sargotra. Most Batwal in India have been strongly influenced by/and part of the Sindhis, while some Batwals have come under the influence of other Hindu reformists. Like the Punjab Batwal, the Jammu Batwal community also consists of clans. Their main clans are the Nakodar and Kasim. The Batwal shares the customs and traditions of the locally dominant Sindhis ethnic group and speak Punjabi, Sindhi and Dogri languages.
