= Mola Langrial =

Coordinates: 32°38′26″N 74°10′24.9″E

Mohla Langrial موھلہ لنگڑیال
- Interactive map of Mohla Langrial
- Country: Pakistan
- Province: Punjab
- District: Gujrat
- Time zone: UTC+5 (PST)
- Calling code: 053

Mohla Langrial (Urdu: موھلہ لنگڑیال) is a village in Gujrat District, of Punjab, Pakistan. The village is located near the University of Gujrat.
