= Gardezi =

Gardezi (also spelled Gardezy or Gardizi) refers to someone whose origin can be traced back to the city of Gardez in Afghanistan.

There have been a few known Gerdezi families from Gardez who migrated to different parts of Pakistan. Their descendants still carry the surname Gardezi. Gardezi community are traditionally the descendants. Mostly Gardezi are living in Azad Kashmir and Multan, Pakistan.

Same as the ones who carry the surname "Bukhari". Bukhara today is in Uzbekistan.

== People ==
- Abu Sa'id Gardezi, 11th century Persian historian
- Aziza Gardizi, Afghan politician
- Sameer Asad Gardezi (born 1983), Pakistani screenwriter
- Syed Hussain Jahania Gardezi, Pakistani politician
- Saadia Gardezi, Pakistani peace activist, artist and journalist

== See also ==
- Gardēzī Sadaat
