= Noohani =

Tribe in Pakistan and Iran

The Noohani, Nohani or Logur (Sindhi: نُحاڻي) is a Sindhi tribe originating from Sindh, found in the Sindh province of Pakistan and the Makran region of Iranian Baluchistan and Pakistani Baluchistan. As of 2016, the chief of the tribe was Sardar Hakim Ali Noohani.

== Notable people ==
- Mariyam Sultana Noohani
