= Baranzai =

Baloch tribe

Baranzai (Balochi: بلوچ) are a Baloch tribe who live in Sistan and Baluchestan province. Mir Dost Mohammad Khan Baloch was a member of the tribe who ruled Western Balochistan till 1928.

Baranzai is a sub-clan of the Balochi tribe of Mengal, who are a large tribe. Notable sub-clans are Shahizai, Lehri, and Mahmudzai.
