= World Organization for Islamic Services =

Publishing company based in Tehran, Iran

World Organization for Islamic Services (WOFIS) is an Iranian, Tehran based Shi'a Twelver publishing company.

They translate, research and write original Islamic books regarding hadith, Tafsir and the history of Islam as well as other Shi'a topics since 55 years ago. Several of their publications are available on Google Books.
