= Shanzay =

Shanzay or Shanzey
- Pronunciation: [shanˈzay] 1
- Gender: female

Origin
- Language: Persian
- Origin: Persian,French
- Meaning: royalty

Other names
- Short form: Shanzé

Shanzay (also spelled Shanzae, "Shanzeh",Persian شانزے) is a feminine name meaning "princess" or "royalty".

Shanzay or Shanzey ( French: Champs-É ) is a female name of Old Persian origin, and its basic root is either from Shah- an -zay (literally "daughter of king"/"royal princess") or Shaan-zeh ("Of dignity/magnificent"). The name is also associated with the famous French avenue, Champs-Élysées, pronounced roughly as "shahn zay-lee-ZAY", with a nasal "ahn" sound, a soft 's' linking "champs" and "élysées" (like a 'z'), and the final 'é' sounding like 'ay' in "day". The name "Shanzey" is often noted for its phonetic elegance and stylistic resonance with prestigious French landmarks, contributing to its perception as a sophisticated and distinctive choice.It reinforces the qualities associated with the avenue: elegance, luxury, beauty, art, and quintessential Parisian flair.

Background

The most likely French link is the surname and place name Chancy (pronounced shahn-SEE in French). It is a commune in Switzerland, near the French border. As a surname, it exists in Francophone regions. It's plausible that Shanzey emerged as a creative respelling or Anglicization of Chancy, transforming it into a given name. .
