= Gokprosh =

Gokprosh is a ridgeline of hills, part of the Coast Range of Baluchistan, Pakistan. The area is noted for being the site of engagements between the British and Baloch rebels in the 1898 Baloch uprising.

== Physical description ==
Gokprosh consists of a single ridge at the eastern end which, however, gradually widens into the usual collection of parallel ridges as it approaches the western boundary of the country. Here the little valley of Kastag is to be found enclosed within it. Midway in its length, the Nihing and Kech rivers join at Kaur-e-awaran and, forming the Dasht river, break southward through a fine gorge known as Gatt.

The summit of the range varies considerably in its general character, the peaks being sometimes pointed and sometimes having flat tops, which broaden out occasionally into plateaux of considerable extent. The principal ones are at the eastern end and include Janzat (4,345), Mukh (3,984) and Khudaband (1,315). It is uninhabited except at Kastag, which was held by Sardar Mir Ahmad of Baho in 1903, and was peopled by Kosags and Lagors. The vegetation is similar to that of the main range. The rocks at the western end of the range are nummulitic, but their age is undecided. A little north of Kastag they consist of very fine grey shales and sandstones with vertical beds and a regular east and west strike.

A 1907 publication notes: There are few difficulties in travelling across the Gokprosh hills. Tal-e-sar is crossed by the track from Pasni to Panjgur via Pidark; and the bridle-path from Pasni to Turbat crosses the range to the south of Turbat; the main track from Gwadar to Turbat passes over the range between Kani and Gushtang, and that from Gwadar to Tump runs via Pittok, crossing the range to the north of Mach Chat. Several tracks also lead from Nigwar and Dasht to Mand, the principal one being that which goes over the Talidar-e-kandag to Mand, and is known as Sargwap-e-rah on account of its frequent zigzags.
