= Machi (name) =

Machi is both a surname and a feminine Japanese given name. Notable people with the name include:

Surname:

- Carmen Machi (born 1963), Spanish actor
- Jean Machi (born 1983), Venezuelan major league baseball pitcher
- Yūji Machi (born 1962), Japanese voice actor

Given name:

- Ike Gyokuran (1727–1784), Japanese painter and poet whose birth name was Machi
- Machi Tanaka (born 1983), Japanese long-distance runner
