= Sarmastani =

Sarmastani is a Baloch tribe settled in Balochistan, Pakistan. They derive their tribal name from their heroic ancestor; Sardar Sarmast, who was a blacksmith by profession. Their name implies a connection with the historical Sarmatians tribes of the Caucasus.
