= Sajjadi =

Sajjadi is a surname of Persian origin, that is most prevalent in Iran as well. It is derived from the Arabic word Sajjad, meaning one who prostrates (in reference to prayer).

== People with the surname Sajjadi ==
- Abdul Qayyum Sajjadi - Afghani politician
- Abdol-Hamid Heyrat Sajjadi - Iranian Historian and scholar
- Bakhtiar Sajjadi - Kurdish writer
- Seyed Kamal Sajjadi - Iranian politician
- Shahrdad G Sajjadi - British Mathematician
- Kamal Sajjadi - Iranian Diplomat and Politician
