= Yarahmadzai tribe =

Baloch tribe

Yarahmadzai - Baloch Tribe
Total population
- 30,000 (est.)

Regions with significant populations

Languages
- Balochi, Persian

Religion
- Islam

Yarahmadzai (Balochi: یار احمدزی), also known as Shahnavazi, is a Baloch tribe inhabiting the region of Balochistan in Iran. The majority of the tribe are settled in Sarhad, an area in the city of Khash. The population of the Yarahmadzais is estimated 30,000 and are divided into three smaller groups; Sohrabzai, Hosseinzai and Rahmatzai.

== History ==
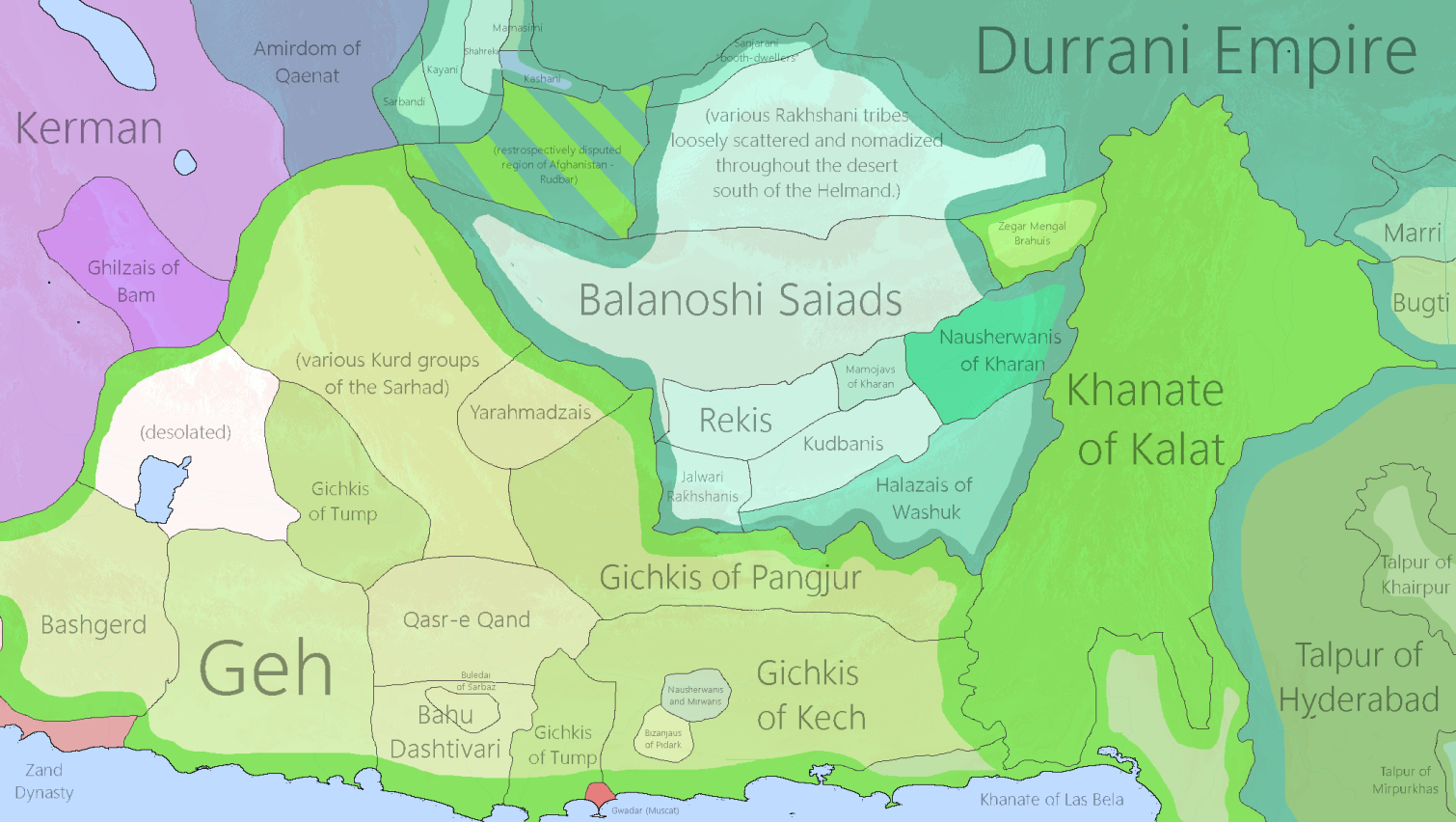
Balochistan in the year 1789. Yarahmadzais can be seen as a tribe under suzerainty to the Khanate of Kalat

This tribe originates from the hills of Sibi, East Balochistan, The tribe had migrated to the Sarhad plateau in the beginning of the 18th century, have expanded since then, while becoming one of the most prominent and powerful tribes in the region of Sarhad. Before the arrival of the Yarahmadzais, Khash was mainly populated by the Kurds. The Kurds were originally sent to the Sarhad region of Balochistan by Abbas the Great as a part of his policy to weaken rebellious Baloch tribes through removing them from their local territories. As the Yarahmadzai tribe established themselves in Sarhad, the tribe grew larger and became more powerful. This tribe was seen as a big threat to representatives of the rulers established in Western Balochistan, as well as in the regions of Bampur and Khash. Unlike neighboring Baloch tribes, particularly in Southern Balochistan, the Yarahmadzais never recognized nor served foreign governors of the Sarhad region. Instead, they had established their own political leader, the Sardar, who was a representative for the tribe. Several disputes occurred between the Gamshadzai sub-tribe of the Yarahmadzais and the Kurds, once resulting in the Kurds being driven out from the Sarhad region, and giving up the area to the Yarahmadzais.

According to Percy Molesworth Sykes, the Yarahmadzai became the most influential tribe under the notorious Sardar Jiand Khan of Sarhad, where 50 families controlled over 1,000 families; next in importance were the Rekis who aggregated over 600 families. This tribe would mostly gain income through banditry, from predatory raiding of livestock, goods, and slaves outside Sarhad, mostly from Kerman and Jiroft areas.

=== The British Campaign in 1916 ===
During World War I, the Yarahmadzais disturbed the lines of communication of the British frontier and raided their goods, this gave some concerns to the British forces and the fact that the Germans have through Turkish agents supplied the Sarhadi tribes with weapons and promised them that the Germans have converted to Islam in order to let the Sarhadi tribes show allegiance with them. The British knew that the Sarhad route was important for their purpose and to keep control over India. The mission to prevent the tribes from raiding fell on General Reginald Dyer. The three major tribes that performed raids and disturbed the British line were the Yarahmadzais, Gamshadzais and Ismaelzais is even known as Damanis.

According to Reginald Dyer he went to Sarhad with a small troop and he managed to keep the Sarhadi tribes in line with account the campaign of arms and bluffs. Dyer used many spies to obtain information about the movements of the Yarahmadzai tribe and their plans, one of the spies who Dyer was proud of was Ido Khan Reki(Rigi) who contributed well. Juma Khan the tribal chief of the Ismaelzais decided to surrender when he heard about the plans of Dyer, while Sardar Jiand Khan and Halil Khan (Chief of the Gamshadzai) decided to resist the British forces. Several battles occurred between Dyer and the Damanis (Yarahmadzai, Gamshadzai) Jiand lost his son and the Gamshadzais chief (Khalil Khan) got killed during one of the battles.

In a documentary that was made about Baloch tribes and sardars, the late tribal leader Sardar Khan Mohammad recounts from what he has been told about what happened during one of the last battles his tribe had against the British.

He tells about when Jiand khan and his son were arrested and they (the British garrison) were on their march to Quetta to bring them (the hostage) into captivity when they were suddenly ambushed by the Yarahmadzais and Gamshadzais in an area called Nalak (a narrow passage nearby Khash). They managed to free them and in the battle two of the yarahmadzais lost their lives while the losses for Dyer were devastating. Dyer himself was not present in the battle but after what happened he never showed up in Sarhad. He never mentioned the battle of Nalak in his book instead he wrote about how they have succeeded and weakened the Sarhadi tribes and that an agreement was reached with the Yarahmadzais and Gamshadzai after that two tribes sent letters to Dyer to allow them to return to their home.

The story about what happened during Dyer's campaign lacks credibility in Sarhad, which was one of the reasons that Abdol Hossein Yadegari a Baloch intellectual (he died in an accident in 2006) decided to make research about what really happened in Dyers Campaign. Abdol Hossein Yadegari translated Dyer's book with additional comments based on his research, his work was published posthumously in Persian.

Little record exists of what Sarhad was after Dyer but from what was heard and been told among the tribesmen the raiding continued, or like Coleridge Kennard describes it "Just as we are preparing for the night a jambaz rider arrives from the desert to announce that a Balochi raiding army, a very powerful one a thousand men ride in it is close to his heels, marching from Khwash under Shasavar Khan (Yarahmadzai)"

=== Pacification of Sarhad ===
In 1921, Reza Khan who was a member of the Cossack Brigade performed a coup by taking control over Tehran and establishing his own government with the dissolution of the previous. This occurred during a time were Persia became a battlefield between Soviets and Britain, Britain used Persia to perform attacks on Russia to be able to reverse the Revolution (Russian Revolution). With the help of Britain Reza Khan managed to establish his power and one of his first tasks was to secure the borders by starting the pacification of Persia. After a series of campaigns against Azeris, Qashqais, Turkmens and the Lurs the last region that remained to be pacified and brought under the control of the central government was Balochistan.

The pacification of western Balochistan started in 1928 in the south where the army of Reza Khan's successfully defeated Dost Mohammad Khan's of Bampur, but the real battle was left for Reza Khan army to defeat the Damanis. The battle with Damanis proved to be more difficult than expected, Dyer's campaign had strengthened the tribes of Damanis in warfare they were well prepared for the army of Reza Khan. The Ismaelzais led by Juma Khan resisted from Shuro (West of Zahedan) while the Yarahmadzai led by Jiand Khan (by then aged ninety years old) resisted from the Khwash area. As reported by Nigel Colett Jiand khan was leading the resistance until he was arrested and replaced by his nephew, Shaswar Khan, who became the head of the tribe and continued to lead the resistance. The war lasted for six years from 1928–1934. Philip Carl Salzman summarizes the pacification of western Balochistan "Reza Shah then turned his attention to the most remote region claimed to be part of Iran, Balochistan. An army was sent in 1928 and succeeded, with the help of artillery and primitive bombing from early aircraft, in pacifying all of Balochistan, except for the Sarhad. Led by the Yarahmadzai, who had earlier fought the British, the Sarhadi tribes resisted successfully, until finally settling and accepting the suzerainty of the Persian crown in 1935". The Yarahmadzais were defeated but not forcibly settled. As a result of the pacification, the Yarahmadzai lost their tribal name and became the Shah Navazi (Shah strokers) while Ismaeilzais became Shah Baksh (Shahs Pardon).
