= Bhait =

- Village
- Location in Punjab, India Bhait (India)
- Coordinates: 31.768948°N 75.532246°E
- Country: India
- State: Punjab
- District: Gurdaspur

Government
  - Type: Panchayati raj (India)
  - Body: Gram panchayat

Population (2011)
  - Total: 988
- Sex ratio 508/480♂/♀

Languages
  - Official: Punjabi
  - Other spoken: Hindi
- Time zone: UTC+5:30 (IST)
- PIN: 143527
- Telephone code: 01822
- ISO 3166 code: IN-PB
- Vehicle registration: PB-06
- Website: gurdaspur.gov.in

Bhait is a village in Gurdaspur district of Punjab State, India, located 29 kilometres (18 mi) from Gurdaspur. The village is administrated by a Sarpanch, an elected representative of the village as per the Constitution of India and the Panchayati raj system.

== Demography ==
According to the report published by Census India in 2011, Bhait has 207 houses and a population of 988 residents, 508 males and 480 females. Its literacy rate is 78.54%, higher than the state average of 75.84%. The population of children under the age of 6 years is 98, forming 9.92% of its population, and the child sex ratio is approximately 633, lower than the state average of 846.

== Population data ==
Particulars	Total	Male	Female
Total No. of Houses	207	-	-
Population	988	508	480
Child (0–6)	98	60	38
Schedule Caste	360	187	173
Schedule Tribe	0	0	0
Literacy	78.54 %	81.70 %	75.34 %
Total Workers	309	272	37
Main Worker	282	0	0
Marginal Worker	27	22	5

== Transportation ==
The closest airport to the village is Sri Guru Ram Das Ji International Airport.
