= Mugheri =

Arab tribe

Mugheri (or Mughery, Mughairi) are a social group in Pakistan descended from Arabs. Sources claim the Mugheri are descended from a Field Marshal Mughera Bin Zaid Bin Hatim, who was appointed as a Field Marshal for Sindh by his elder brother and famous Governor of Sindh during Abbasid Caliphate named Daud Bin Zaid Bin Hatim. Daud was appointed as a Governor of Sindh in 800AD (184 Hijri) by Caliph Haroon-ur-Rashid (786-809). Governor Daud Bin Zaid Bin Hatim governed Sindh for the longest period of nine years and later his son Bashar Bin Daud Bin Hatim became the next successor Governor of Sindh during the caliphate of Mamoon-ur-Rashid. Additionally, the Mughera tribe was at the climax because they ran their business, trade, affairs and matters effectively and were considered as wealthy tribe under the Abbasid Caliphate.

== History ==
=== Researchers and scholars ===
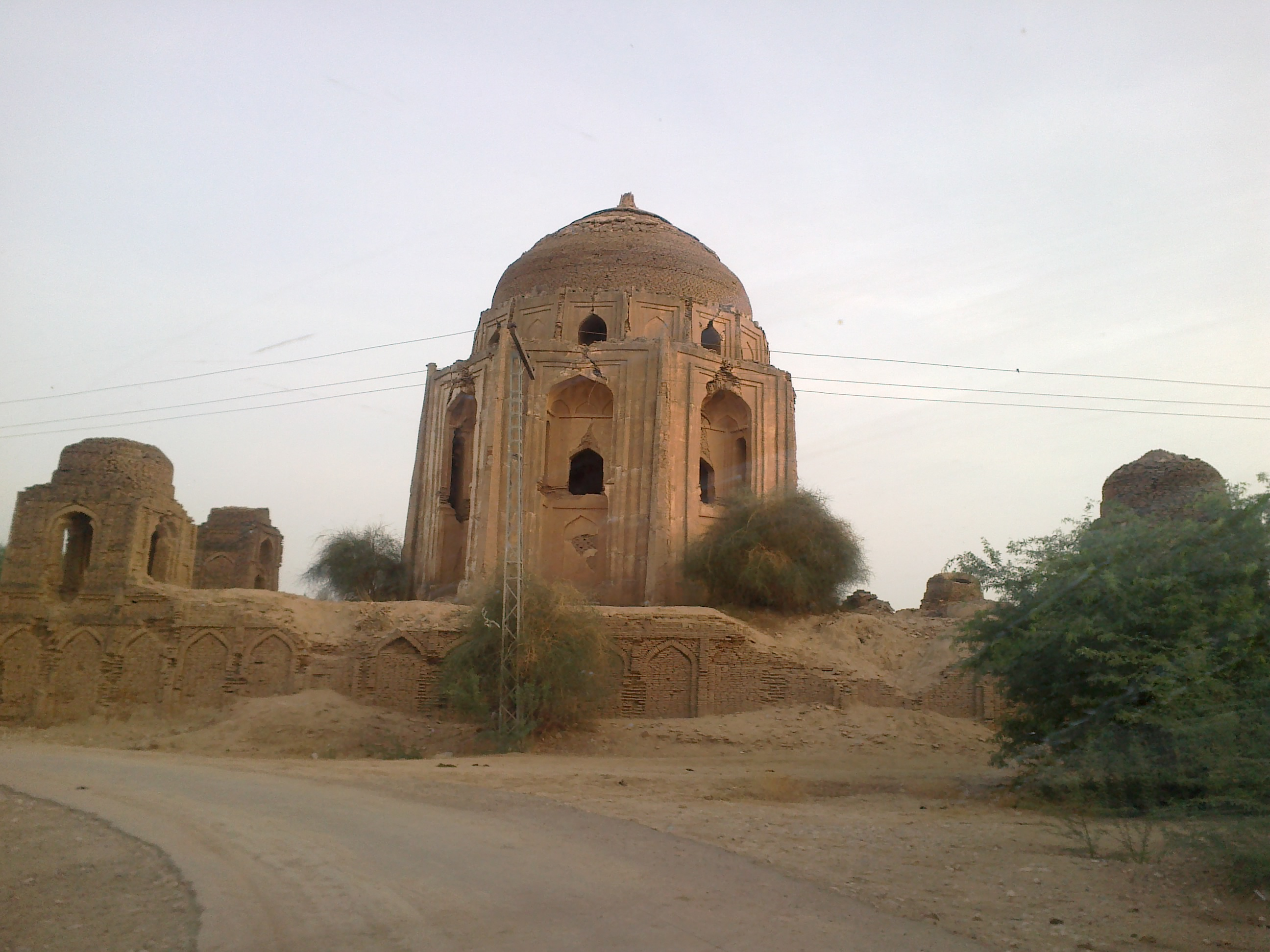
Bhag, Baluchistan; This is possible second place after Iraq where Mughera's tribe settled in majority

==== Khair Muhammad Buriro ====
According to this researcher Mugheri are directly descended from Mir Ali Khan, the second son of Mir Jalal Khan who is believed to be an ancestor of Baloch. The researcher further mentions in his book that, in a Burdi tribe, there was a Hajija Family, which had Mugher Khan and Buland Khan as two brothers. Moreover, Mugheri tribe is descended from Mugher Khan who had three sons Rozi, Khushal and Hassan Mugheri while Rozi had four sons namely Nazar, Feroz, Jaghir and Dighar.

==== Ayaz Bhagat ====
A well known Researcher on Castes living in Sindh Pakistan found that Mugheri are Baloch because, Rai bahadur Lala Hetoram, who was a local person and the first historian of Baluchistan include Mugheri in Baloch tribes. Further, this indicated that, Mugheri belong to Baloch tribe. Ayaz further says that Mugheri are descended from Warrior Mughera Bin Zaid Bin Hatim, who came in Sindh in 800AD along his delegation.

==== Shaikh Sadik Ali Ansari ====
Ansari writes in his book The Musalamn Races that Burdi (Buledi) tribe is descendant of Mir Ali the second son of Mir Jalal Khan. Mir Ali had two sons Zendi Khan and Murad Khan, while Zendi had two sons Sundar and Haji. All Burdi (Buledi) are descendant of Sundar and Haji Khan or in other words Burdi are descendant of Zendi Khan. He further added that Mugheri are descendant of Haji Khan (Hajija) or in other words they are said to be sub-caste of Burdi tribe.

==== Rai Bahadur Lala Hetoram ====
The first historian of Baluchistan Lala Hoat Ram of 1907 in his book “History of Baluchistan” did not consider and mention Mugheri in any Baloch tribes and even he did not consider Mugheri as sub-caste of Magsi and Burdi.

==== Justice(R) Khuda Bux Marri ====
The research work of Mansel Longworth Dames and his combined English poetry was translated in Sindhi by Justice(R) Khuda Bux Marri, who wrote a book “Baluchistan in the constitution of History” in the last of this book he made an index of Baloch tribes in which he did not mention Mugheri in Burdi (Buledi) tribe but he considered them as sub-caste of Magsi.

=== Origin ===
After the review of various above research, it has concluded that Mugheri are not clan of Baloch or Rajput or Soomra or Kalhoro or Channa or Bhatti or Machi or Muhani or Jat but Mugheri are in fact descended from great Field Marshal Mughera Bin Zaid Bin Hatim. Thus descendants of Mughera call themselves as Mugheri (i.e.; Descendant of Mughera Bin Zaid Bin Hatim). In addition, the Caliph Haroon-ur-Rashid, who remained famous caliph in Abbasid Caliphate. In his caliphate Sindhi tribes were fighting for their freedom and tribes who were inhabitants of Sindh such as Yemeni and Hejazi were great opponents of each other. For controlling the critical situations of Sindh in 184 Hijri (800AD) Caliph Haroon-ur-Rashid appointed Daud Bin Zaid Bin Hatim as a Governor of Sindh.

=== Arrival of Mughera in Sindh ===
The Governor Daud Bin Zaid Bin Hatim before going to Sindh, appointed his brother Mughera Bin Zaid Bin Hatim as Nawab (Naib) or Field Marshal and sent him with the delegation to Sindh for controlling the critical situations of Sindh. Since, the conditions of Sindh were critical, one side there was a war of detention of Sindhi people and on other side two tribes were opponents of each other. When Mughera Bin Zaid Bin Hatim reached Mansura the doors of the city were closed by Nazadya tribe and they made one condition for Mughera that he wouldn't take revenge from nazadya so ultimately they would leave the city.

=== The death of Mughera ===
According to the book" History of Yaqoubi" when Mughera entered in the city, there was a huge crowd of nazadya tribe who started fighting with Mughera and killed him in that war. Though in other books of history, it is found that when Mughera reached the Mansura he got defeat from Nazadya tribe, and eventually, he ran and got shelter in mountainous area. Later, who told whole story to his brother Daud Bin Zaid Bin Hatim, who later came to Sindh and controlled the situations. However, before his arrival in Sindh Mughera was killed. Governor Daud Bin Zaid Bin Hatim remained ruler of Sindh for the period of nine years. The warriors and tribes who came along Mughera Bin Zaid Bin Hatim to Sindh, they ascribed their names with him after his death as Mugheri.

=== Rule of Mughera’s tribe ===
According to Scholar and writer Qazi Athar Mubarkapori that Daud Bin Zaid Bin Hatim, brother of Mughera remained ruler of Sindh for the period of nine years and later his son Bashar Bin Daud Bin Hatim became the next successor Governor of Sindh during Mamoon-ur-Rasheed caliphate. They settled their many people, who then became the inhabitants of Sindh. As Mughera Bin Zaid Bin Hatim was killed in Sindh thus the people his tribe affiliated their names with Mughera. Who later, moved to Northern Sindh and called themselves with their Leader's name as “Mugheri”.

=== Climax of Mugheri tribe ===
Qazi Athar Mubarkapori in his book “Abbasid Caliphate and Hindustan” writes that in Abbasid Caliphate Mughera's tribe was at the climax because they ran their business, affairs and matters in a great way and from this tribe most of the people were considered as riches in the Abbasid Caliphate. As compared to other Islamic countries, in Sindh Mughera's tribe was a rich, remained rulers and later their population converted into the majority. Thus Governors of Mughera's tribe contributed a lot for their tribe and they played vital role in the development of Sindh.

=== Settlement of Mugheri tribe ===
The major areas occupied by Mugheri tribe are; Bhag, District Bolan, Baluchistan, Jacobabad, Larkana, Qamber Shahdadkot District, Warah, Waggan, Nasirabad District, Mehar, Dadu District, La lu Rawnk, Khairpur District, Sanghar District, Nawabshah, Karachi, and lower Punjab, Pakistan

== Sub-castes ==
The sub-castes of this tribe in Pakistan are:

- Arbani (derived from Arban Khan)
- Notkani (derived from Noat Khan)
- Hajija (derived from Haji Khan)
- Sathiyani (derived from Sathi Khan)
- Ferozani (derived from Feroz Khan)
- Kalani (derived from Kaalan Khan)
- Sirajani (derived from Siraj Khan)
- Bambrani
- Latifani (derived from Latif )
- Digarani (derived from Digaar)
- Rehanzai
- Madozai
- Wahdadani (derived from Wahadad)
- Khor
- Rustamani (derived from Rustam Khan)
- Nazrani (derived from Nazar)
- Kherani (derived from Kher)
- Somarani (derived from Soomar)
- Rolyani
- Jaghirani (derived from Jhagir)
- Nariwal (derived from Bhag Nari, area in Baluchistan)
- Fazulzai ( Fazal of Bhag Nari)
- Mirozai
- Gujar

== See also ==
- History of Sindh
