= Sumayya Usmani =

Pakistan-born Scottish food educator

Sumayya Usmani is a Pakistani-born author, memoirist, food writer and writing mentor based in Scotland.

== Biography ==
Usmani was born in Karachi, Pakistan, and moved to England in 2006, and to Glasgow in 2015. Her early childhood was spent on board ship as her father was a merchant navy captain. She practised law for 12 years before developing a career as a food writer, with a blog called My Tamarind Kitchen.

Her first published book, Summers Under the Tamarind Tree: Recipes & Memories From Pakistan (2016, Frances Lincoln) was listed by The Independent in its "11 best new cookbooks 2016", described as "spellbinding" and "an unprecedentedly authentic snapshot into the culinary culture of this often overlooked country". Her next book Mountain Berries and Desert Spice: Sweet Inspiration From the Hunza Valley to the Arabian Sea with photographs by Joanna Yee was published in 2017. Her third book, a food memoir called Andaza for which she won the Scottish Book Trust's Next Chapter Award 2021, was published in April 2023. As of 2023 she was studying for a master's degree in creative writing at the University of Glasgow and working on a book which she describes as "a braided narrative of folklore, food and history from an ancient city in my homeland".

== Selected publications ==
- Usmani, Sumayya (2016). Summers under the tamarind tree: recipes & memories from Pakistan. Frances Lincoln. ISBN 978-0-7112-3678-3.
- Usmani, Sumayya (2017). Mountain berries & desert spice: sweet inspiration from the Hunza Valley to the Arabian Sea. London: Frances Lincoln. ISBN 978-0711238527.
- Usmani, Sumayya (13 April 2023). Andaza: a memoir of food, flavour and freedom in the Pakistani kitchen. [S.l.]: Murdoch Books. ISBN 9781922616197.
