= Muhammad Zaheer ud Din Khan Alizai =

Pakistani politician

Member of the Provincial Assembly of the Punjab
- In office 15 August 2018 – 14 January 2023
- Constituency: PP-214 Multan-IV
- In office 29 May 2013 – 31 May 2018

Personal details
- Born: 21 September 1973 (age 53) Multan, Punjab, Pakistan
- Party: IPP (2023-present)
- Other political affiliations: PTI (2013-2023)

Muhammad Zaheer ud Din Khan Alizai is a Pakistani politician who was a Member of the Provincial Assembly of the Punjab, from May 2013 to May 2018 and from August 2018 to January 2023.

== Early life and education ==
He was born on 21 September 1973 in Multan.

He received matriculation level education.

== Political career ==
He was elected to the Provincial Assembly of the Punjab as a candidate of Pakistan Tehreek-e-Insaf (PTI) from Constituency PP-194 (Multan-I) in the 2013 Pakistani general election.

He was re-elected to Provincial Assembly of the Punjab as a candidate of PTI from Constituency PP-214 (Multan-IV) in the 2018 Pakistani general election.

On 18 May 2023, he left the PTI due to the 2023 Pakistani protests.
