= Dewala =

Coordinates: 29°52′N 71°01′E

- Town and union council
- Interactive map of Dewala
- Country: Pakistan
- Province: Khyber-Pakhtunkhwa
- District: Dera Ismail Khan District
- Time zone: UTC+5 (PST)

Dewala is a town and union council of Dera Ismail Khan District in Khyber-Pakhtunkhwa province of Pakistan.
