= Sameer Asad Gardezi =

Sameer A. Gardezi (born 1983) is a WGA Award Winning Pakistani American Muslim screenwriter and television writer who has written for Aliens in America, Modern Family, Mr. Sunshine, Outsourced and Goodwin Games.

Sameer has written for several networks including Nickelodeon, Comedy Central, The CW, FOX, ABC and NBC and studios such as 20th Century, Universal and Disney. For his work on Modern Family, he was awarded a Writers Guild of America Award for his excellence in writing. Most recently, he collaborated with The Daily Show's Trevor Noah.
