= 1898 Baloch uprising =

The 1898 Baloch uprising was a revolt that occurred in Balochistan, modern-day Pakistan. It was instigated by Sardar Mehrab Khan Gichki and Mir Baloch Khan Nousherwani.

== History ==
Sardar Mehrab Khan Gichki started the revolt by attacking the Nazim, Diwan Udho Dass. He was then taken prisoner in the morning of 6 January. At the same time, the rebels, led by Mir Rustam Khan, launched an attack on the camp which resulted in loss of lives and a great portion of Government property. After the rebels took control of the Turbat fort, the Nazim had to sought refuge at Kalatuk. After the attack, Mehrab Khan communicated with his brother and some of the rebels moved towards the direction of the sea coast.

They looted Pasni, and destroyed the telegraph line between Pasni and Gwadar on the way. However, a column was despatched by Karachi under Colonel Mayne consisting of 400 Infantry and two guns. The rebels were defeated with heavy losses in action at the defile of Gokprosh. They were also defeated south of Turbat. Baloch Khan was killed along with about 150 others. The forts of Shahrak, Nag, Hor, and Sehr were subsequently demolished.

== Motives ==
There appeared to have been five causes of the outbreak. Mir Baloch Khan, Nausherwani, who already held the surrounding country, had been granted the Bit fort in Buleda by the Khan of Kalat. However, it was occupied by Mir Azam Khan, Buledi, who held a sanad for its possession from the Khan and consequently refused to give it up, and the question was referred to the Agent to the Governor-General who decided it in favour of Mir Azum Khan, thus incensing Mir Baloch Khan against the Nazim who was considered responsible for the decision.

Secondly, Mehrab Khan, Gichki, had long cherished resentment at Sir Robert Sandeman's action in nominating to the chieftainship of the Kech Gichkis, his elder brother, Sheh Umar, a man of much inferior capacity to himself. Innovations introduced by the Nazim into the system of levying revenue, his personal unpopularity among the Muslim people, and the general unrest which had extended all down the North-Western frontier during the previous year, were other factors in the situation.

== Outcome ==
The rising led to arrangements for the introduction of a new form of administration. And at the end of the year, Mir Mehrulla Khan, Raisani, was sent to Makran as Nazim, where he has since continued to direct affairs (1905).
