= Noorani =

Noorani (Arabic: نوراني) is a Muslim surname, derived from the Persian nurani, meaning "luminous" or "bright", from the Arabic nur, meaning "light". The Noorani word is specifically used to refer to the immediate family members of His Highness the Aga Khan.

== Noorani family ==
The term Noorani family refers to the immediate family members of the Imam of the Shia Imami Nizari Ismaili Muslims, headed by Aga Khan V, the current Aga Khan and the 50th hereditary Imam, upon his succession to the 1,400-year-old family's dynasty.

The term Nur (light), is a core concept in Ismaili belief, representing the Divine-ilm (eternal knowledge) and guidance that the Imam possesses, signifies the inheritance of authority which, mentioned in the verses of the Holy Qur’an, ayat al-Nur (24:35)

Roz-e-Nur (The Day of Light) is celebrated on every spring in May by the Ismaili Jamat of the Pamir valley and its diaspora to commemorate the first historic visit of His Highness the Aga Khan IV, to the Gorno-Badakhshan region and Dushanbe, Tajikistan, on 25 May 1995. The day has come to symbolise peace, a holiday of light, faith, and hope for the future.

Alternative spellings include Noorany, Nourani and Nurani.

== Other people with the surname ==
People who are not related to the Noorani family but share the surname include:

- A. G. Noorani (1930–2024), Indian lawyer and historian
- Ali Noorani (born 1977), American political activist
- Asif Noorani (born 1942), Pakistani writer
- Dilawar Noorani, Indian architect known for designing the Usha Kiran skyscraper in Mumbai
- Ehsaan Noorani (born 1963), Indian musician
- Kaukab Noorani Okarvi (born 1957), Pakistani scholar
- Motez Nourani (born 2002), Tunisian footballer
- Syed Muhammad Shah Noorani (born 1951), Pakistani religious leader
- Tasneem Noorani, Pakistani bureaucrat
- Zain Noorani (1927–1992) Pakistani politician
