= Liukang Kalmas =

- District
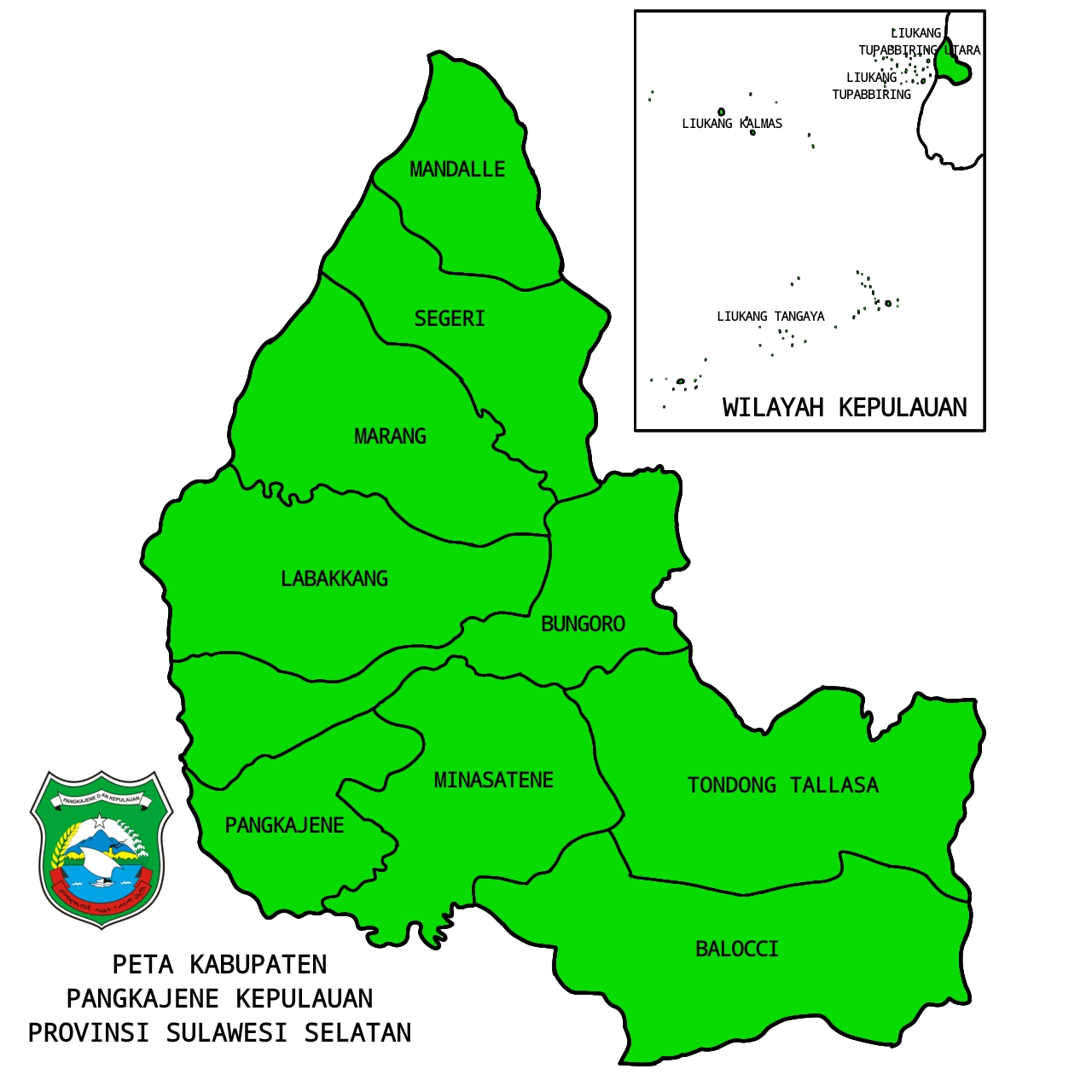
- Liukang Kalmas District is located in the archipelago of Pangkep Regency, South Sulawesi, and is included in the cluster of islands far to the west of the mainland of Sulawesi. On the map, Liukang Kalmas is located on the far left of the inset (archipelago area box), indicating its fairly remote location.

- Location within South Sulawesi Location within Sulawesi Location within Indonesia
- Coordinates: 5°11′34.9476″S 117°39′18.5904″E
- Country: Indonesia
- Province: South Sulawesi
- Regency: Pangkajene and Islands Regency
- District seat: Kalukuang

Area
  - Total: 91.50 km^{2} (35.33 sq mi)

Population (2023)
  - Total: 15,314
  - Density: 167.4/km^{2} (433.5/sq mi)

Liukang Kalmas is a district (kecamatan) in Pangkajene and Islands Regency, South Sulawesi, Indonesia. As of 2023, it was inhabited by 15,314 people, and has a total area of 91.50 km^{2}.

== Geography ==
Liukang Kalmas consists of seven villages (desa):

- Dewakang
- Doang Doangan Lompo
- Kalukuang
- Kanyurang
- Marasende
- Pammas
- Sabaru
