= Khushk =

Kushik Baloch
کشک کشک بلوچ

Regions with significant populations
- Pakistan

Languages
- Siraiki, Balochi, Sindhi

Religion
- Islam

Related ethnic groups
- list of Baloch tribes

Kushik Baloch (Khushak, Khoshk, Kuchik, Khishk, Koshk or Kushik) is Baloch tribe located in Sindh, Balochistan and Punjab provinces of Pakistan. It is a branch of Rind tribe.

== See also ==
- List of Baloch Tribes
