= Ogahi =

Mughal tribe of Pakistan

Ogahis
اوڳاھي

Total population
- 80,000 approx

Regions with significant populations
- Pakistan (Sindh, Punjab, Baluchistan)

Languages
- Sindhi, Punjabi, Saraiki, Urdu

Religion
- Islam

Ogahi (Sindhi: اوڳاھي; Punjabi: اوگاہی) is a land-owning tribe, primarily living in the provinces of Sindh and Punjab, Pakistan. They belong to the Saman or Samma ethnic group. The majority lives in Sindh and Punjab while a small number is also present in Khyber Pakhtunkhwa and Balochistan. The Ogahi tribesmen speak Sindhi, Saraiki and Punjabi languages and are predominantly Muslims. They have the surnames Mir, Sardar, Jam, Khan and Mian.

In the early 21st century, the Ogahi were involved in a long-running dispute with the Teghani tribe, which started over the theft of cattle and resulted in at least 85 deaths on both sides.
