= Langrial, Abbottabad =

Langrial Abbottabad
- Union council
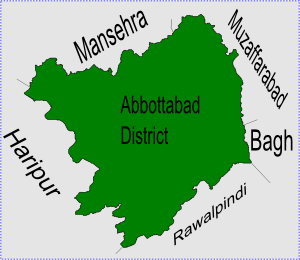
- Langrial is located in Abbottabad District
- Interactive map of Langrial Abbottabad
- Coordinates: 33°56′0″N 73°7′0″E
- Country: Pakistan
- Province: Khyber-Pakhtunkhwa
- District: Abbottabad
- Tehsil: Havelian

Government
  - Nazim: Faisal Khan Jadoon
  - Naib Nazim: Aurang Zeb Khan

Langrial is one of the 51 union councils of Abbottabad District in Khyber-Pakhtunkhwa province of Pakistan. It is located in the south west of the district and borders Haripur District. It is surrounded by the tall mountains and beautiful valleys. The people of the town are very hospitable and its literacy rate is comparatively higher than the surrounding villages because it has numerous Govt and private schools and colleges.

== Subdivisions ==
The Union Council is subdivided into the following areas: Basgora, Chotala, Dabran, Danna Nooral, Faqir Mohammad, Gali Batgran, Karhakki, Langrial, Lassan and Manjia. Other villages are Kialapain and Basara.
