= Langrian =

- Village
- Location in Punjab, India Langrian (India)
- Coordinates: 31.0921004°N 75.7392822°E
- Country: India
- State: Punjab
- District: Jalandhar

Government
  - Type: Panchayat raj
  - Body: Gram panchayat
- Elevation: 240 m (790 ft)

Population (2011)
  - Total: 337
- Sex ratio 173/164 ♂/♀

Languages
  - Official: Punjabi
- Time zone: UTC+5:30 (IST)
- PIN: 144409
- ISO 3166 code: IN-PB
- Vehicle registration: PB- 08
- Website: jalandhar.nic.in

Langrian is a village in Jalandhar district of Punjab State, India. It is located 12.2 km away from Phillaur, 35.9 km from district headquarter Jalandhar and 122 km from state capital Chandigarh. The village is administrated by a sarpanch who is an elected representative of village as per Panchayati raj (India).

== Education ==
The village has a Punjabi medium, co-ed primary school (GPS Langrian). The school provide mid-day meal as per Indian Midday Meal Scheme and the meal prepared in school premises and it was found in 1970.

== Demography ==
According to the report published by Census India in 2011, Langrian has a total number of 62 houses and population of 337 of which include 173 males and 164 females. Literacy rate of Langrian is 75.17%, lower than state average of 75.84%. The population of children under the age of 6 years is 39 which is 11.57% of total population of Langrian, and child sex ratio is approximately 500 lower than state average of 846.

Most of the people are from Schedule Caste which constitutes 94.96% of total population in Langrian. The town does not have any Schedule Tribe population so far.

As per census 2011, 63 people were engaged in work activities out of the total population of Langrian which includes 58 males and 5 females. According to census survey report 2011, 28.57% workers describe their work as main work and 71.43% workers are involved in marginal activity providing livelihood for less than 6 months.

== Transport ==
Bhattian railway station is the nearest train station; however, Phillaur Junction train station is 11.6 km away from the village. The village is 42.6 km away from domestic airport in Ludhiana and the nearest international airport is located in Chandigarh also Sri Guru Ram Dass Jee International Airport is the second nearest airport which is 134 km away in Amritsar.
