= Khumra (Islam) =

Regions with significant populations
- • Pakistan • India

Languages
- • Urdu • Hindi • Punjabi

Religion
- Islam

Related ethnic groups
- • Momin Ansari • Bisati • Shaikh • Behna

Khumra (Arabic: خمرة) are a Muslim community found mainly in the Rohilkhand region of Uttar Pradesh in India. They are also known as Sangtarash and Hansiri. A few were also found in Panipat and Karnal in Haryana, most of whom are now found in Pakistan. They generally refer themselves as Khumra Shaikh.

The community has been granted Other Backward Classes status in Uttar Pradesh.
