= Parihar (surname) =

Surname list

Parihar is a Nepali and Indian surname of Hindu origin.

Notable people with the surname include:

- Seema Parihar, Indian politician
- Navni Parihar, Indian actress
- Daleep Singh Parihar, Indian politician
- Shakti Raj Parihar, Indian politician
- Sonal Parihar, Indian actress
- Kan Singh Parihar, judge of Rajasthan high court
- Ruby Parihar, South Indian actress
- Dilip Singh Parihar, Indian politicians

== See also ==
- Parihar (disambiguation)
