= Mangnejo =

Sindhi tribe

Mangnejo (Sindhi: منڱڻيجو) is a Sindhi tribe in Sindh, Pakistan. Mangneja tribe is settled in Kamber Shahdadkot, Khairpur, Karachi, Sukkur, Naushahro Feroze, Tando Allahyar, Hyderabad and Larkana districts of Sindh. The Mangneja speak the Sindhi language.
