= Syed Ali Qutab Shah Rizvi =

Syed Ali Qutab Shah Rizvi was a member of the Pakistani Sindh Provincial Assembly in the 1970s and 1980s, representing the district of Tharparkar. He served in the fifth (1972–1977), sixth (1977), and eighth (1988–1990) assemblies.
