= Mir Abdul Jabbar Khan =

Pakistani politician

Deputy Chairman of the Senate of Pakistan
- In office 21 March 1994 – 20 March 1997

Mir Abdul Jabbar Khan was a Pakistani politician who served as the Deputy Chairman of the Senate of Pakistan from 21 March 1994 to 20 March 1997.
