= Pitafi =

Baloch clan

The Pitafis (پتافي) are an ethnic Baloch tribe found in Pakistan, present especially in the Dera Ghazi Khan district.
