= Behna =

Regions with significant populations
- India

Languages
- • Urdu • Hindi

Religion
- Islam

The Behna are a Muslim community found in North India.
