= Lone (caste) =

Kashmiri caste

Lone (Kashmiri: Devanagari: लोन्; Perso-Arabic: لون, 'lōn'; /loːn/), historically known as Lavanya (from Sanskrit लावण्य/lāvaṇya) is a Kashmiri surname found in the Indian administered union territory of Jammu and Kashmir and the Pakistani administered province of Azad Kashmir.

== Origin ==
Lones are believed to be the descendants of ancient Lavanya clan of Kashmir. The 11th-century Sanskrit-language text Rajatarangini mentions the Lavanyas of a place called Lahara. Lahara is identified with the modern Lar town of Kashmir.

Another account of the possible back migration of Lones comes from Sir Walter Lawrence according to which the villagers of Kashmir said that Lones had come from Chilas.

== Notable people ==
- Sajjad Gani Lone
- Abdul Gani Lone
- Shabnam Gani Lone
