= Mir Abdul Karim Nousherwani =

Pakistani politician

Member of the Provincial Assembly of Balochistan
- In office 2013–2018
- Constituency: PB-46 (Kharan)
- In office 1997–1999
- Constituency: PB-33 (Kharan)
- In office 1990–1993
- Constituency: PB-33 (Kharan)
- In office 1985–1988
- Constituency: PB-33 (Kharan)

Personal details
- Party: Pakistan Muslim League (Q)

Mir Abdul Karim Nousherwani is a Pakistani politician who was a Member of the Provincial Assembly of Balochistan, between 1985 and May 2018.

== Education and personal life ==
He was born in Kharan District.

He has received Islamic education and is an agriculturist by profession.

== Political career ==
He was elected to the Provincial Assembly of Balochistan in the 1985 Pakistani general election.

He ran for the seat of the Provincial Assembly of Balochistan as a candidate of IJI Constituency PB-33 (Kharan) in the 1988 Pakistani general election but was unsuccessful. He received 6,206 votes and lost the seat to an independent candidate, Dost Muhammad Muhammad Hassani.

He was re-elected to the Provincial Assembly of Balochistan as a candidate of JWP Constituency PB-33 (Kharan) in the 1990 Pakistani general election. He received 12,648 votes and defeated an independent candidate, Dost Muhammad Muhammad Hassani.

He was re-elected to the Provincial Assembly of Balochistan as a candidate of BNM from Constituency PB-33 (Kharan) in the 1997 Pakistani general election. He received 11,103 votes and defeated a candidate of Balochistan National Party.

He was re-elected to the Provincial Assembly of Balochistan as a candidate of Pakistan Muslim League (Q) from Constituency PB-46 Kharan in the 2013 Pakistani general election. He received 3,413 votes and defeated Sanaullah Baloch.
