= Taqvi =

Taqvi is an Arabic-language surname used by descendants of Imam Muhammad al-Jawad.

- Muhammad al-Jawad (811–835), ninth of the Twelve Imams of Islam
- Nasim Amrohvi (1908–1987), a Pakistani Urdu poet, philosopher, and lexicographer
- Syed Ahmad Khan (1817–1898), Islamic pragmatist, Islamic reformer, and philosopher
