= Langrial clan =

Langrial
- Jāti: Jatt, Rajput
- Religions: Islam
- Languages: Punjabi
- Country: Pakistan
- Region: Punjab
- Ethnicity: Punjabi
- Family names: Langrial/Langryal

The Langrial (لنگريال) is a clan of Jats in Pakistan. Some Langrials claim Rajput descent. They are scattered across the Punjab and some parts of KPK.
