= Damanis =

Damani
Languages
- Balochi

Religion
- Islam

Related ethnic groups
- Baloch people

Damani are a Baloch tribe in the Balochistan region, which incorporates regions of Iran, Afghanistan and Pakistan. The majority of Damanis live in the Balochistan, Kerman, Khorasan and Hormongan regions of Iran, with minority populations in Eastern Balochistan in Southern Afghanistan and the Chagai District of the Balochistan province of Pakistan. The chief clans of Damanis are Yarahmadzai, Ismailzai and Gamshadzai.

The Damani tribe is one of the oldest tribes of the Balochis. The Damani are very similar to other Baloch tribes, as they also came from the south of the Caspian, therefore, they must also be of Parthian origin.

At the end of the 19th century, the tribe played a significant role in the Seistan Force. They faced the British Indian Army and fought them with strategic and military assistance from the German agent, Zugmayer during years 1915-1916. In order to prevent these, and to control the Damanis, Brig.-Gen. R. E. Dyer, Commanding in Balochistan a, moved a part of his force to Khash in May, 1916.
