= Bangulzai tribe =

Brahui tribe in Pakistan

The Bangulzai (Brahui: بنگلزی) is an ethnic Brahui tribe in the Balochistan province of Pakistan, belonging to the Sarawani branch of the Brahui tribes. The tribe inhabits Sarawan and Kacchi, and is bilingual in Brahui and Balochi.
