= Maiwand (disambiguation) =

Maiwand is a village in Afghanistan.

Maiwand or Maywand may also refer to:

- Maywand District, in Kandahar Province, Afghanistan
- Maiwand, Pakistan, a town
- Maiwand Kabul F.C., an Afghan sports club
- Maiwand (mountain), in Bavaria, Germany
- Maiwand TV, a television network channel in Kabul, Afghanistan

== See also ==
- Battle of Maiwand in 1880
