= Khetran =

Ethnic group in Balochistan and Pakistan

The Khetrans are an ethnolinguistic group primarily native to Barkhan in Balochistan and Dera Ghazi Khan in Punjab, Pakistan. Their total population was estimated at approximately 150,000 in 2017, with at least two-thirds speaking their native Khetrani language, an Indo-Aryan language. Many Khetrans in Barkhan are also bilingual in Balochi, while those settled further east in the Dera Ghazi Khan region commonly speak Saraiki.

== Origins ==
Colonial ethnographers struggled to classify them as a group. Early reports variously classified them as Afghan, Baloch, or a distinct ethnic group. Certain reports also linked them traditions concerning the Mianai and Kasi Afghans. The Khetrans themselves also reflected this duality; with some sources citing that the Khetrans of Vehowa claimed to be pashtuns while those in Barkhan aligned themselves with the Baloch.

According to the 1st edition of Encyclopedia of Islam, Khetrans pre-date Baloch migrations into their native hilly tract of the Sulaiman Mountains. Khetrans were already going through assimilation by the Baloch in the 19th century, a process slowed down only by the advent of British rule, and were organized in a similar way to a Baloch tuman. Conversely, Khetrans have assimilated several other peoples in their vicinity as well, including Jats, Baloch and Pashtuns.

== History ==
In 1845 under the command of Sir Charles James Napier 7,000 men attacked the Bugtis, killing many of them. Khetrans provided sanctuary to hundreds of Bugtis who took refuge in their lands.

In 1847 Sir William attacked the Bugtis with full strength; this time the Bugtis lost 500 fighting men and 120 were arrested. Marris took the opportunity and also attacked the Bugtis, seizing much of their area. The Bugtis went to the Khetran Sardar and asked for his help; that same year a combined attack of Khetrans and Bugtis drove the Marris off, killing more than 70 of their men and taking possession of their cattle.

=== 1918 rebellion against British rule ===
Operations against the Marri and Khetran tribes (also known as the Marri Punitive Expedition) was the British name for a punitive expedition carried out against the Marri and Khetran tribes of Balochistan, British India between February and April 1918. The Marri rose against the British authorities around 18 February, encouraged by rumours that the British were short of manpower due to the First World War. British attempts at conciliation were repulsed and, on 20 February, a major attack was made by 1,000 – 3,000 Marri upon the British post at Gumbaz. This attack was repulsed by a much smaller British force that inflicted heavy losses upon the Marri. A subsequent withdrawal of British forces from Kohlu and its occupation by the Marri led the Khetrans to join the rising. The town of Barkhan was occupied by Marri-Khetran forces and raids were made upon villages in the Sibi and Loralai districts; railways in the area were also attacked.

The British assembled the Marri Field Force of British Army and British Indian Army troops under Major-General Richard Wapshare to combat the rising. Two columns under Brigadier-Generals T. H. Hardy and Philip Miles went on the offensive into territory occupied by the tribes. Miles inflicted a heavy defeat upon a Marri-Khetran force at Fort Munro on 15 March and then captured Barkhan, ending Khetran involvement in the rising. Hardy defeated a large Marri force at Hadb on 3 April and afterwards, assisted by bombing by the Royal Flying Corps, captured the Marri capital of Kahan. The Marri sardar Khair Bux Mari surrendered to the British on 8 April.

The campaign caused a significant reduction in tax revenue from the area and damage to private and government property. A council of elders was assembled after the campaign which recommended compensation payments be made by the Marri and the imprisonment of members of both tribes. The rising inspired rebellions by the Mengal and Gurgnari tribes, who killed their own sardars, and by the Musakhel, which was put down by part of the Marri Field Force.
