= Operations against the Marri and Khetran tribes =

1918 rebellion against British rule in India

- Part of the conflicts on the North-West Frontier
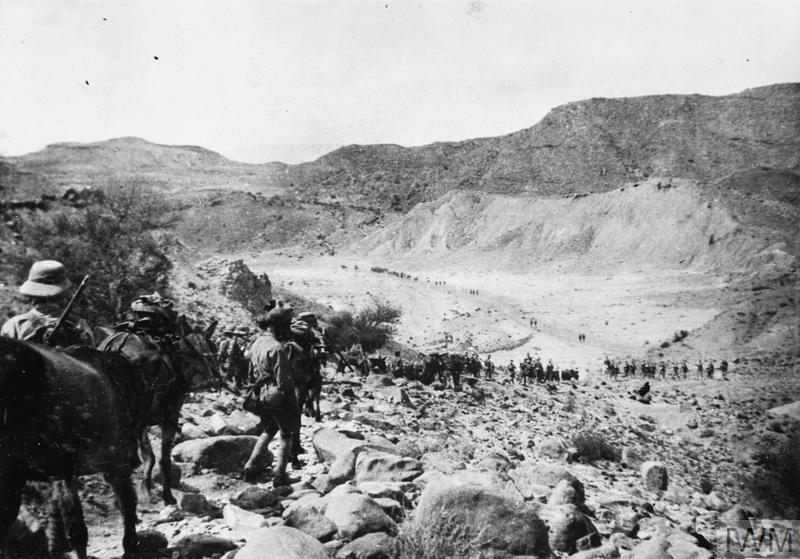
- Part of the British force returning from the conflict, passing through the hills at the southern border of Marri country.
Date	18 February 1918 – 8 April 1918
Location	North-Eastern Balochistan, British India
Result	British victory

Belligerents
United Kingdom; British India	Marri tribe Khetran tribe

Commanders and leaders
Richard Wapshare	Khair Bux Mari; Khudadad Mari

Casualties and losses
	300 killed and 700 wounded

Operations against the Marri and Khetran tribes (also known as the Marri Punitive Expedition) was the British name for a punitive expedition carried out against the Marri and Khetran tribes of Balochistan, British India between February and April 1918. The Marri rose against the British authorities around 18 February, encouraged by rumours that the British were short of manpower due to the First World War. British attempts at conciliation were repulsed and, on 20 February, a major attack was made by 1,000 – 3,000 Marri upon the British post at Gumbaz. This attack was repulsed by a much smaller British force that inflicted heavy losses upon the Marri. A subsequent withdrawal of British forces from Kohlu and its occupation by the Marri led the Khetrans to join the rising. The town of Barkhan was occupied by Marri-Khetran forces and raids were made upon villages in the Sibi and Loralai districts; railways in the area were also attacked.

The British assembled the Marri Field Force of British Army and British Indian Army troops under Major-General Richard Wapshare to combat the rising. Two columns under Brigadier-Generals T. H. Hardy and Philip Miles went on the offensive into territory occupied by the tribes. Miles inflicted a heavy defeat upon a Marri-Khetran force at Fort Munro on 15 March and then captured Barkhan, ending Khetran involvement in the rising. Hardy defeated a large Marri force at Hadb on 3 April and afterwards, assisted by bombing by the Royal Flying Corps, captured the Marri capital of Kahan. The Marri sardar Khair Bux Mari surrendered to the British on 8 April.

The campaign caused a significant reduction in tax revenue from the area and damage to private and government property. A council of elders was assembled after the campaign which recommended compensation payments be made by the Marri and the imprisonment of members of both tribes. The rising inspired rebellions by the Mengal and Gurgnari tribes, who killed their own sardars, and by the Musakhel, which was put down by part of the Marri Field Force.

== Background ==
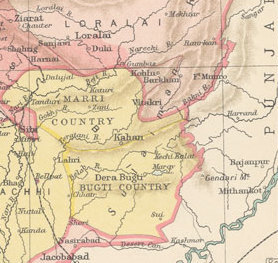
Map showing, at right, Marri Country with the adjacent Loralai region (which included the Khetran territory)

Balochistan, in modern Pakistan came under indirect British rule in 1839 through the Khan of Kalat. The 1876 Treaty of Kalat brought the province and its tribes under direct control as part of British India. The Marri tribe live in Marri-Bugti Country and are one of the most north-easterly of the Baloch peoples. Marri Country, at an elevation of 800–3,000 metres (2,600–9,800 ft), is mountainous and difficult to traverse with few passes; it is surrounded by the flatter land of the Sibi and Indus basins. Their hereditary leader was known as the sardar, though often referred to by the British as the Marri nawab; he was assisted by a number of chief men, also usually hereditary. The Marri-Bugti country was administered by the British from Sibi District.

The Marri were traditionally raiders and slavers, though these activities were somewhat curtailed under British rule. In 1840 the Marri had ambushed the communications lines of Sir John Keane's army fighting in the First Anglo-Afghan War; a subsequent punitive expedition against the Marri was repulsed with heavy British losses. The Marri supported the British in a war with the Bugti in 1845 but in the following decades again came into conflict with the British. British officers John Jacob and Robert Groves Sandeman did much work to keep the peace but in 1880 the Marri attacked British lines of communication during the Second Anglo-Afghan War. An expedition by British Brigadier-General Charles MacGregor, led to the submission of the Marri and the payment of fines, after which there was peace until the 1910s.

The Khetran tribe are of Baloch origin and their territory lies to the north of the Marri and their only other neighbours are Pathans. Their leader, the tomundar, was based at the capital Barkhan. Their lands consist of a series of fertile valleys. By the late 19th century they were closely linked with the Marris, Bugtis and Lagharis. The British authorities passed messages to the Khetrans via the Lagharis. They were described as a peaceful tribe in 1879, not noted for raiding. They sometimes came into conflict with the British for harbouring fugitives and accepting stolen property.

== Prelude ==
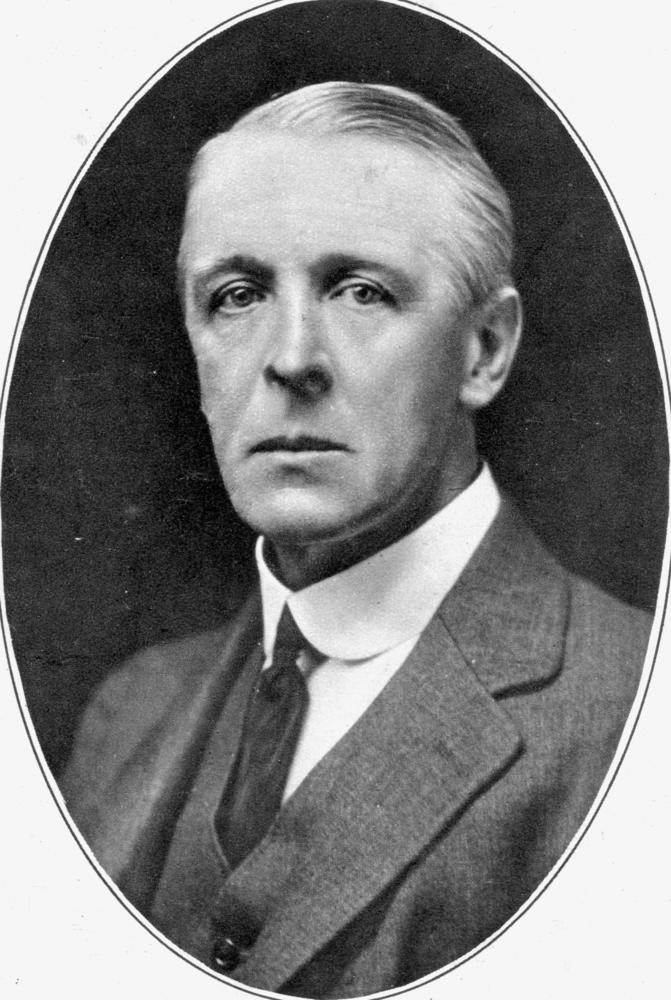
Viscount Chelmsford

During the early 20th century the Marri had become more restive. The First World War, a major draw on British manpower, began in 1914. The Marri carried out a series of raids in 1915 and 1916 for which they received light punishment from the British administration. In July 1917 members of the tribe quarrelled with men from the neighbouring Bugti, resulting in the deaths of six Marri and four Bugti and the wounding of two Marri and three Bugti. The quarrel was resolved by a jirga, a traditional meeting of tribal leaders, in November. In August 1917 the Marri quarrelled with the Khetrans, leading to the deaths of two Marri and three Khetrans.

In October 1917 the Marri sardar, Mir Khair Bux Mari, visited Quetta to pay homage to the Viceroy of India, Frederic Thesiger, 1st Viscount Chelmsford. The sardar was publicly rebuked by Chelmsford over his tribe's recent behaviour. During the visit the sardar and his chiefs seem to have been influenced by rumours, common at the time, that the British were losing battles in the First World War and were withdrawing troops from India. This impression was strengthened by British attempts to recruit men from the Baloch tribes: the sardar reasoned that the British must be very desperate if they sought recruits from his tribe for the first time. The sardar refused a request made at Sibi by the British political agent, Colonel Allen McConaghey. This led to increasing tension between the two parties and the sardar sought support from other tribes. The decision to oppose the British may have originated with the Bijarani section of the tribe who were prominent in the subsequent rising.

== Rising ==
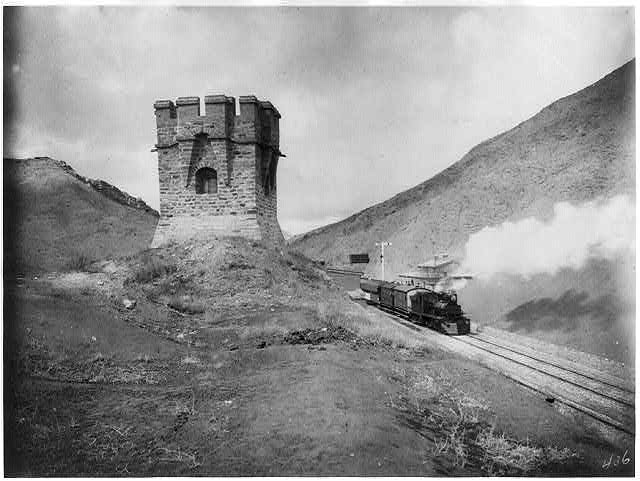
Kach blockhouse and railway

The rising against British rule began around 18 February 1918. On 19 February McConaghey, with fifty sowars of the 3rd Skinner's Horse, arrived at Gumbaz, a pass in Marri country, where a British post and garrison was maintained. He found that the Marri tribal levies had deserted and the pass had been blocked by a force of tribesmen who had cut the telegraph line to Kohlu. McConaghey sent the sardar of the Loni tribe to the Marri force to invite their sardar to a conference but he was fired upon and wounded, after which McConaghey withdrew.

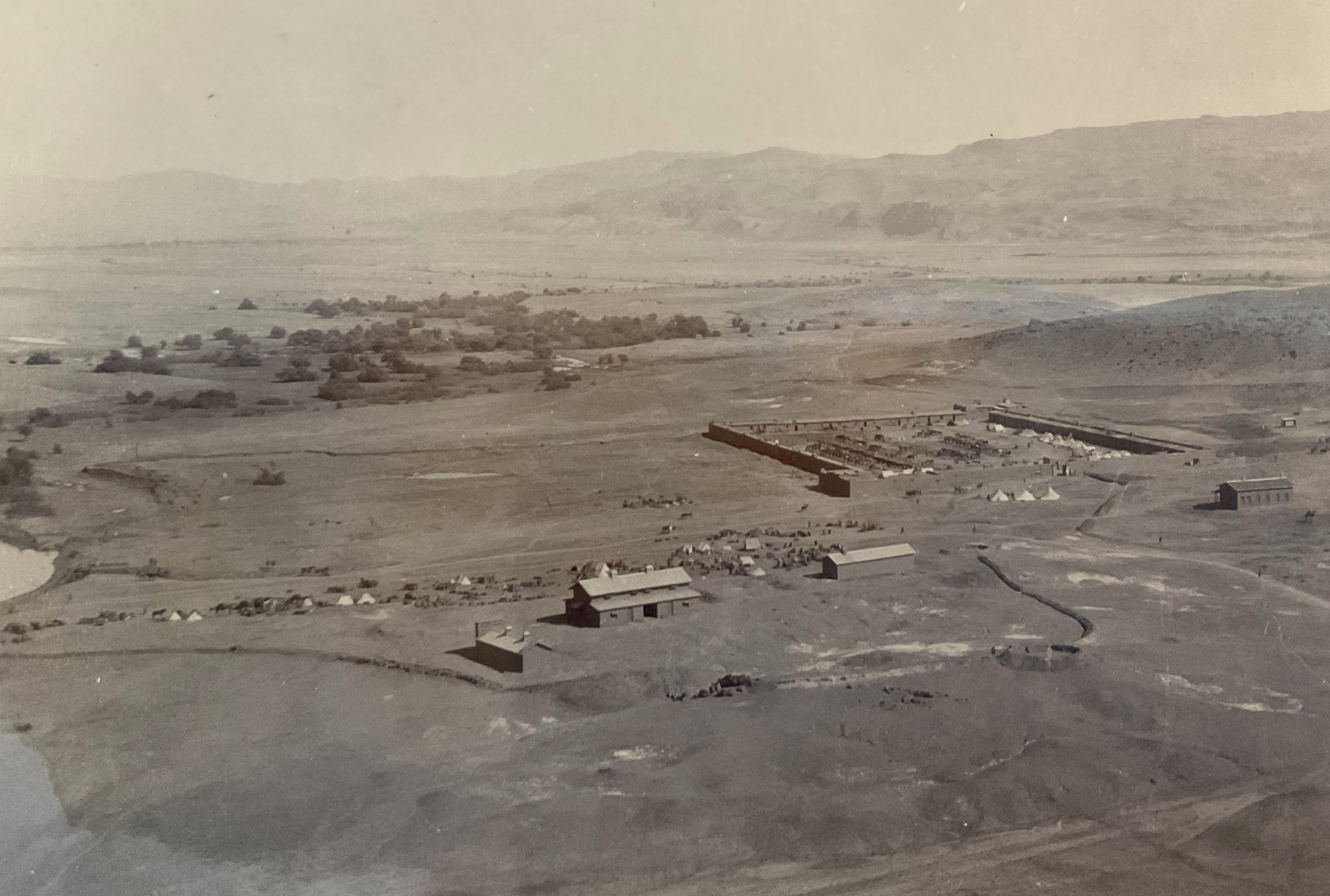
Photo of Gumbaz Fort after the attack once reinforcements had arrived

At 1.30am on 20 February the British post at Gumbaz was attacked by a force of Marri, estimated as being 1,000 – 3,000 strong, equipped with scaling ladders, under the command of Mir Khudadad Mari. The British garrison of 75 sowars, in two parties under Lieutenant-Colonel Gaussen and Lieutenant Harold Watson, together with a number of Indian Imperial Police officers defended the post for the next six hours. After hard fighting, during which the perimeter wall was overrun, the Marri withdrew just before dawn. The British estimated the Marri loss at 125 killed and 135 wounded, though when reviewed at the end of the war this was considered a significant under-estimate. The British recovered 77 dead and wounded tribesmen from the battlefield the following morning.

There were a number of policemen and civil service revenue collectors at Kohlu who were evacuated to Barkhan. Government buildings in the town were afterwards burnt by the Marri, despite further attempts at conciliation by McConaghey. The Khetran tribe then joined the rising and Barkhan was reinforced with men from the Frontier Constabulary and Punjab levies. Despite this, the British commander at Barkhan, a police officer, determined that the town could not be defended and withdrew his men to Dera Ghazi Khan on 5 March. The Marri and Khetrans then entered Barkhan, looted the government treasury and burnt the administrative buildings.

Raids were also made upon Fort Munro, which was partly burnt, and upon the inhabitants of Sibi and Loralai districts. Hindu-owned bunnia were particularly targeted and many camels and cattle were stolen. Attacks upon the Sind–Pishin and Bolan Pass railways led to the British placing garrisons at each station. In one attack on a goods train at Kach, six Indians and one European were killed and a further three Indians wounded. The railway station at Harnai was a major resupply point for the British during the operations.

== Punitive expedition ==
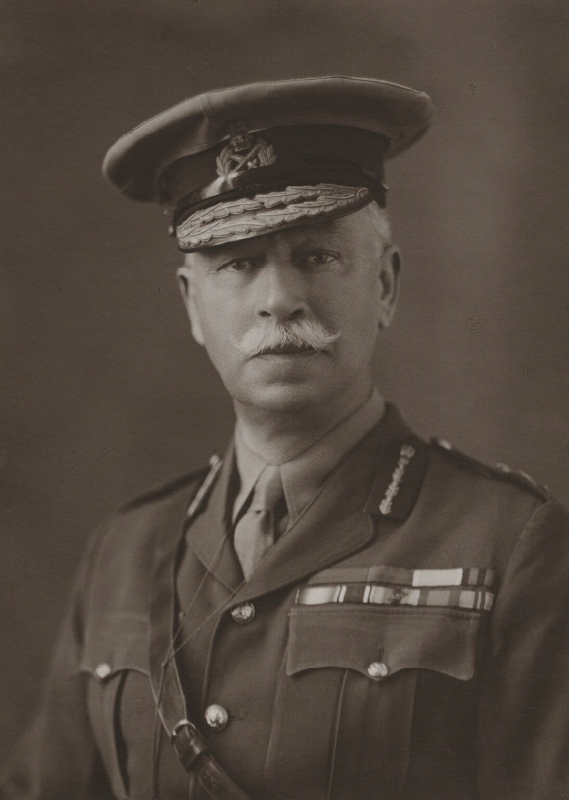
Major-General Richard Wapshare

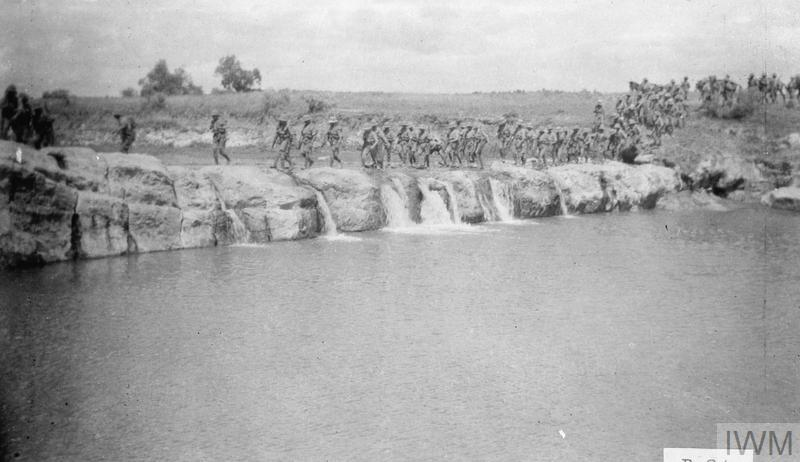
Men of Miles' column cross a river near Dera Ghazi Khan

The attacks on Kohlu caused the British to consider sending a punitive expedition to punish the Marri and Khetran tribes and such an expedition was ordered by the Government of India on 28 February. Major-General Richard Wapshare was placed in overall command of the expedition and gathered troops to form two columns; one at Duki under Brigadier-General Thomas Henry Hardy and one at Rakhni under Brigadier-General Philip Miles. Miles' column was also known as the Dera Ghazi Khan column after the district that it operated in. The whole was known as the Marri Punitive Expedition or the Marri Field Force. The British were initially underequipped for an operation in Marri territory, lacking tents they had to improvise bivouacs against the cold and rain. Towards the end of the campaign the weather grew hot and the force endured conditions of 110 °F (43 °C) in the shade.

Miles' column included infantry from the 55th Coke's Rifles and was reinforced by the Peshawar Battery of the Indian Mountain Artillery under Major EG Campbell on 9 March. Detachments of these units advanced to Fort Munro on 13 March where, two days later, they were attacked by a force of 3,000 Marri and Khetrans, armed largely with swords. The Marri occupied a number of bungalows as well as a hill overlooking the British position. An attack made by two companies of Coke's Rifles, with supporting artillery fire at a range of 1,700 yards (1,600 m), cleared the bungalows. The hill was cleared with artillery fire alone, some 32 shells being sufficient to cause the Marri to withdraw. Marri losses in this action were 21 killed and wounded.

Miles, whose column was around brigade strength, advanced the 50 miles (80 km) to Barkhan, the capture of which effectively ended Khetran involvement in the fighting. Miles afterwards moved around 18 miles (29 km) south-west to Vitakri, meeting no opposition. The majority of Khetrans formally submitted to the British by 3 April and Miles' force withdrew to Dera Ghazi Khan on 20 April.

Hardy's column advanced through Marri-held territory burning their villages and crops and driving off livestock. He reached Kohlu on 23 March, having met no resistance. On 3 April Hardy's column reached Hadb where they met a force of 1,200 Marri, which were attacked and forced to retreat after losing 70–80 men killed and 100 wounded. The next day Hardy moved on Maiwand, by which time he considered that the main threat was over and the Marri limited to only minor raids against his men.

The Royal Flying Corps, despite being hindered by poor weather, engine problems and mountainous terrain, operated with Hardy's column carrying out bombing and strafing attacks and aerial reconnaissance up to 20 miles (32 km) in advance of the British forces. The unit's commander, Captain George Roulston Travis, during a bombing raid was forced to land in Marri-held territory and walk the 21 miles (34 km) to Hardy's column; he was awarded the Distinguished Flying Cross for his contributions to the campaign. Travis' unit repeatedly bombed the Marri capital Kahan with nine Royal Aircraft Factory B.E.3 aircraft, which helped induce the surrender of the tribe. Hardy occupied Kahan without resistance and on 8 April Khair Bux Mari surrendered, marking the formal end of the British combat operations. The surrender was reported in the international press on 22 April and formally announced at Kahan on 2 May and at Barkhan on 7 May.

== Aftermath and impact ==
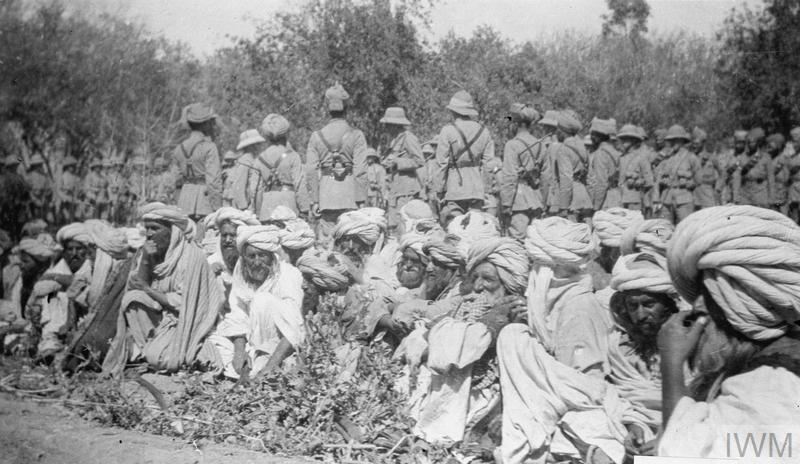
The Khetran chiefs surrender at Barkhan

At the end of the campaign the Marri estimated their losses at 300 killed and 700 wounded; a significant proportion of their total male population of around 12,500. The campaign had a number of negative effects for the British. Tax revenues for Sibi district, affected by the conflict, flooding and grasshopper swarms, were down by 74,000 rupees on the previous year. Government-issued agricultural loan repayments were also reduced. The fighting threatened the grazing grounds in the Sibi district so the British authorities permitted villagers to graze livestock in the state forest. Because the horses were moved during breeding season there was a reduction in the number of foals produced at Sibi for the army remount service. The camels of the expedition caused considerable damage to olive trees at Sanjawi, Tuvekan and Harnai. The additional levies raised to protect the railway cost the British 11,837 rupees.

At the campaign's conclusion a council of elders, led by the wazir of Las Bela, met at Harnai to decide peace terms. The council was attended by representatives of the Marri and Khetran tribes, who were said to be in a penitent mood. The council concluded that the rising had resulted from a feeling of self-importance among the Marri and Khetran tribes, with the immediate trigger being the rumoured reduction in British manpower. The council made a number of recommended actions against the two tribes, which were approved by the British authorities. A financial penalty, totalling 558,580 rupees, as compensation for damage to British government and private property was levied on the tribes; due for repayment in four instalments over the following years. The final Khetran repayment was made in the 1920–21 financial year, though the final Marri repayment was not made.

The tribes also lost 75 breech-loading rifles and the land taken by the Royal Flying Corps for use as aerodromes, which the tribes were required to maintain at their expense. The council recommended that nine Marri and 41 Khetrans be imprisoned as punishment and that the Marri pay the costs for construction of a new road through their territory (the Baluchistan Agency had recommended this due to deficiencies in communications during the expedition). The Khetran prisoners received sentences of imprisonment ranging from 3 months to five years, the Marri prisoners were all released on 18 January 1919 in recognition of good behaviour of the tribe, with the number of robbery and cattle theft offences both considerably reduced. A jirga to resolve the August 1917 Marri-Khetran dispute, which had been postponed because of the expedition, was held in August 1918.

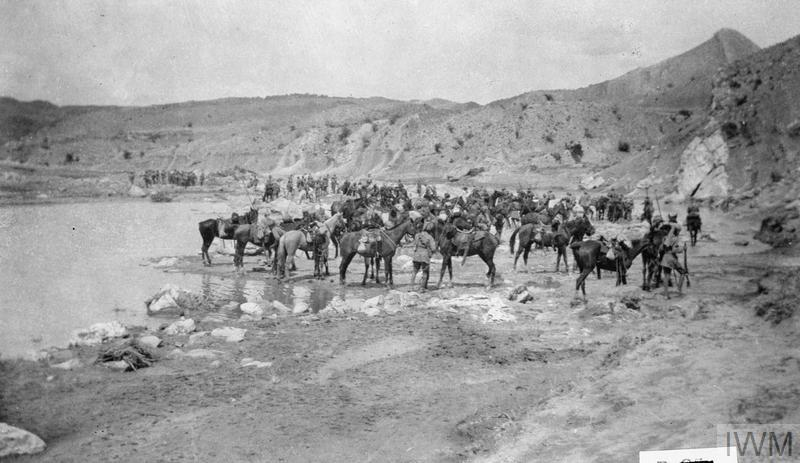
A detachment of the 10th Lancers watering their horses in southern Marri Country

The Marri-Khetran rising led to other acts of rebellion against the British. The sardar and some of the chief men of the Mengal and Gurgnari (part of the Jhalawan) tribes were killed by their own men. The excuse was that both leaders had agreed to provide recruits to the British, but both men were unpopular within their tribes for their attempts to curb raiding activities. The Musakhel, a Pashtun tribe located north of Khetran territory, also rose in March 1918 but were subdued by units of the Marri Field Force in co-operation with militiamen from Zhob. The rest of Baluchistan was quiet during this time and the major leaders, such as the Khan of Kalat, pledged their continuing loyalty to the British. Indeed, British targets for recruitment from the region were actually exceeded. Many units of the Marri Field Force, including the South Lancashire Regiment, Kent Cyclist Battalion, the Peshawar Mountain Battery, the Bengal Sappers & Miners, the Bombay Sappers & Miners and the 2nd King Edward's Own Gurkha Rifles (The Sirmoor Rifles) were also deployed in the 1919 Third Anglo-Afghan War.

In his official dispatches at the end of the Marri Punitive Expedition Wapshare mentioned the good work of Hardy and Miles during the war and that of the Indian government agent Henry Dobbs. Wapshare also thanked Khan Mahmud II of Kalat and other Indian leaders for their contribution of gifts for the comfort of his troops; the Khan had donated 4,000 rupees to aid the sick and wounded soldiers of the expeditionary force. Wapshare was honoured with appointment to companion of the Order of the Star of India for his war service in George V's 15 June 1918 Birthday Honours and on the same day was promoted to lieutenant-general. Hardy was promoted to major-general in May 1918, backdated to 3 December 1917. Marri leader Khair Bux Mari's grandson Khair Bakhsh Marri, named in his honour, became a nationalist Baloch politician.

== British forces involved ==
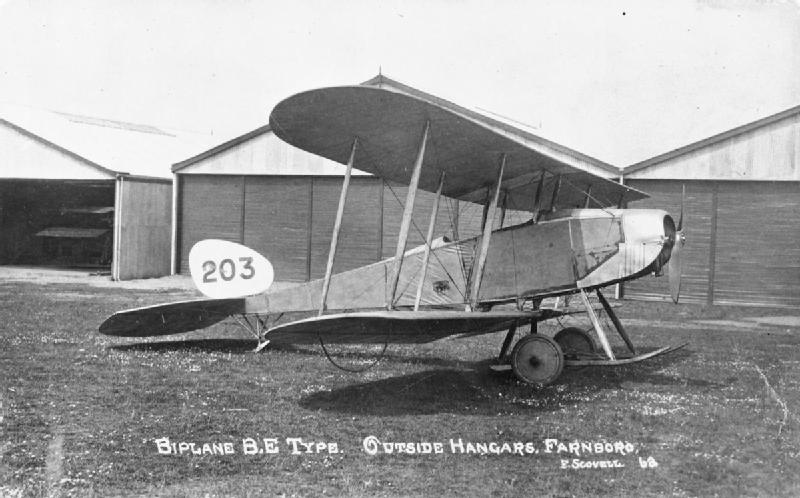
A Royal Flying Corps BE3 as used during the expedition

Elements of the following forces are known to have served during the operations against the Marri and Khetran tribes. Those units marked with a dagger (†) were awarded the battle honour "Baluchistan 1918" for their participation in the campaign.

=== British Army ===
- South Lancashire Regiment† (1st battalion) – A regular army infantry unit, the regiment chose to bear the battle honour on their colours.
- Kent Cyclist Battalion† – A Territorial Force bicycle infantry unit, the battalion chose to bear the battle honour on their colours.
- Indian Establishment, Royal Flying Corps (RFC) – aerial support. After 1 April the RFC was separated from the British Army as the Royal Air Force.

=== British Indian Army ===
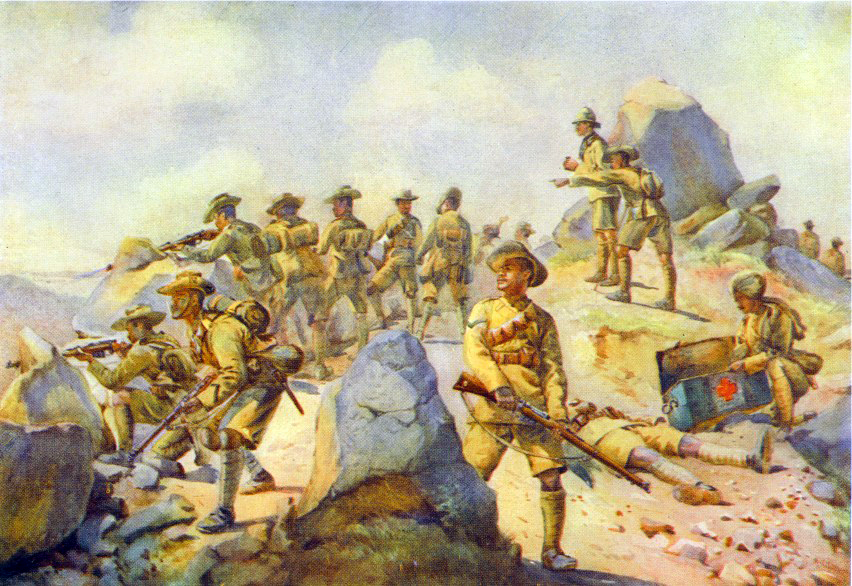
A 1909 depiction of the 4th Ghurkha Rifles in action

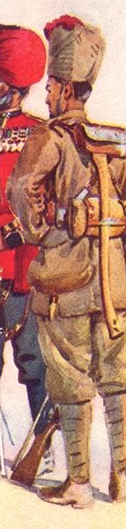
A 1911 depiction of a member of the 107th Pioneers

- 3rd Skinner's Horse† – horse-mounted cavalry
- 10th Duke of Cambridge's Own Lancers (Hodson's Horse) – horse-mounted cavalry.
- Bahawalpur Mounted Rifles – camel-mounted infantry.
- Peshawar Mountain Battery† – mountain artillery.
- Bengal Sappers & Miners† – engineers.
- Bombay Sappers & Miners† – engineers.
- 81st Pioneers† – pioneers. The battle honour was awarded to the Madras Pioneers into which this unit was amalgamated in 1922
- 12th Pioneers & 107th Pioneers† – pioneers. The battle honour was awarded to the Bombay Pioneers into which these units were amalgamated in 1922
- 55th Coke's Rifles (Frontier Force)† – infantry. The battle honour was awarded to the 13th Frontier Force Rifles, into which this unit was amalgamated in 1922.
- 2nd King Edward's Own Gurkha Rifles (The Sirmoor Rifles)† (2nd battalion) – infantry.
- 4th Gurkha Rifles† – infantry.
- 5th Gurkha Rifles (Frontier Force) (3rd battalion) – infantry.

== Bibliography ==
=== Books ===
- Cardew, Francis Gordon (1928). Hodson's Horse, 1857–1922. W. Blackwood. OCLC 561602734.
- Cardozo, Ian (2019). The Indian Army in World War I, 1914–1918. Abingdon, UK: Routledge. ISBN 978-1-000-45867-1.
- Concepts Division of the Aerospace Studies Institute (December 1962). The Role of Airpower in Guerrilla Warfare (World War II). Maxwell Air Force Base, Alabama: Air University. OCLC 396055.
- Cook, Hugh C. B. (1987). The Battle Honours of the British and Indian Armies, 1662–1982. Leo Cooper. ISBN 978-0-85052-082-8.
- Dashti, Naseer (2012). The Baloch and Balochistan: A Historical Account from the Beginning to the Fall of the Baloch State. Trafford Publishing. p. 247. ISBN 978-1-4669-5897-5.
- Graham, C A L (1957). The History of the Indian Mountain Artillery. Aldershot: Gale & Polden. OCLC 3832809.
- Her Majesty's Stationery Office (1925). Battle Honours Awarded for the Great War. London: Andrews UK Limited. ISBN 978-1-78150-187-0.
- Latham, Bryan (1967). A Territorial Soldier's War. Gale & Polden.
- McConaghey, Allen; Rai, Jamiat (1907). Baluchistan District Gazetteer Series: Volume III: Sibi District. Bombay: Times Press. OCLC 1181301543.
- Sherring, Matthew Atmore (1879). Hindu Tribes and Castes. Thacker, Spink & Company.
- Rodger, Alexander (2003). Battle Honours of the British Empire and Commonwealth Land Forces 1662–1991. Marlborough, Wiltshire: The Crowood Press. ISBN 1-86126-637-5.
- Shakespear, Leslie Waterfield (1921). History of the 2nd King Edward's Own Goorkha Rifles (The Sirmoor Rifles): 1911–1921. Gale & Polden. OCLC 220775830.

=== Newspaper and journal articles ===
- Talpur, Mohammad Ali (29 June 2014). "A Love for Liberty". Dawn.
- Dupree, Louis (1968). "The Social Organization of the Marri Baluch. Robert N. Pehrson". American Anthropologist. 70 (1): 140–142. doi:10.1525/aa.1968.70.1.02a00520. ISSN 1548-1433.
- "Punitive Forces Make Progress". The Gazette. 4 April 1918. p. 1.
- "No. 30699". The London Gazette (Supplement). 21 May 1918.
- "No. 30723". The London Gazette (Supplement). 31 May 1918.
- "No. 30799". The London Gazette (Supplement). 16 July 1918.
- "No. 31235". The London Gazette (Supplement). 17 March 1919.
- "No. 31378". The London Gazette (Supplement). 30 May 1919.
- "Baluchistan Campaign". Malaya Tribune. 24 April 1918.
- "The Review of the River Plate: Revista Del Río de La Plata" (1518–1542). 1921.

=== Reports ===
- Battles Nomenclature Committee (1922). The Official Names of the Battles and other Engagements fought by the Military Forces of the British Empire during the Great War, 1914–1919, and the Third Afghan War 1919. London: Her Majesty's Stationery Office (Cmd. 1138). p. 45.
- Administration Report of the Baluchistan Agency, for the year 1917–18 (Bound together with reports 1915–16 to 1919–20, starts page 294 of this binding). Calcutta: Superintendent Government Printing. 1919.
- Administration Report of the Baluchistan Agency, for the year 1918–19 (Bound together with reports 1915–16 to 1919–20, starts page 446 of this binding). Calcutta: Superintendent Government Printing. 1920.
- Administration Report of the Baluchistan Agency, for the year April 1, 1920 to March 31, 1921. Calcutta: Superintendent Government Printing. 1922.

=== Websites ===
- Chisholm, Hugh, ed. (1911). "Marri" . Encyclopædia Britannica (11th ed.). Cambridge University Press.
- Johnson, Douglas J. "The Marri Baluch of Pakistan". The Improvement of Tropical and Subtropical Rangelands. New Zealand Digital Library, University of Waikato.
