= General Miles (disambiguation) =

General Miles was a steamship constructed in 1882. General Miles may also refer to:

- Charles Miles (general) (1884–1958), Australian Army lieutenant general
- Eric Miles (1891–1977), British Army major general
- Herbert Miles (1850–1926), British Army lieutenant general
- Nelson A. Miles (1839–1925), U.S. Army lieutenant general
- Philip Miles (Indian Army officer) (1864–1948), British Indian Army brigadier general
- Sherman Miles (1882–1966), U.S. Army major general
