= Harold Watson (cricketer, born 1893) =

English cricketer

Personal information
- Full name: Harold Boyes Watson
- Born: 23 September 1893; St Margarets, Middlesex, England
- Died: 19 March 1972 (aged 78); Thorpe Bay, Essex, England
- Batting: Unknown
- Bowling: Unknown

Domestic team information
- Years: Team
- 1919: Oxford University

Career statistics
Competition	First-class
Matches	1
Runs scored	2
Batting average	2.00
100s/50s	–/–
Top score	2
Balls bowled	48
Wickets	2
Bowling average	17.50
5 wickets in innings	–
10 wickets in match	–
Best bowling	2/35
Catches/stumpings	–/–
- Source: Cricinfo, 19 April 2020

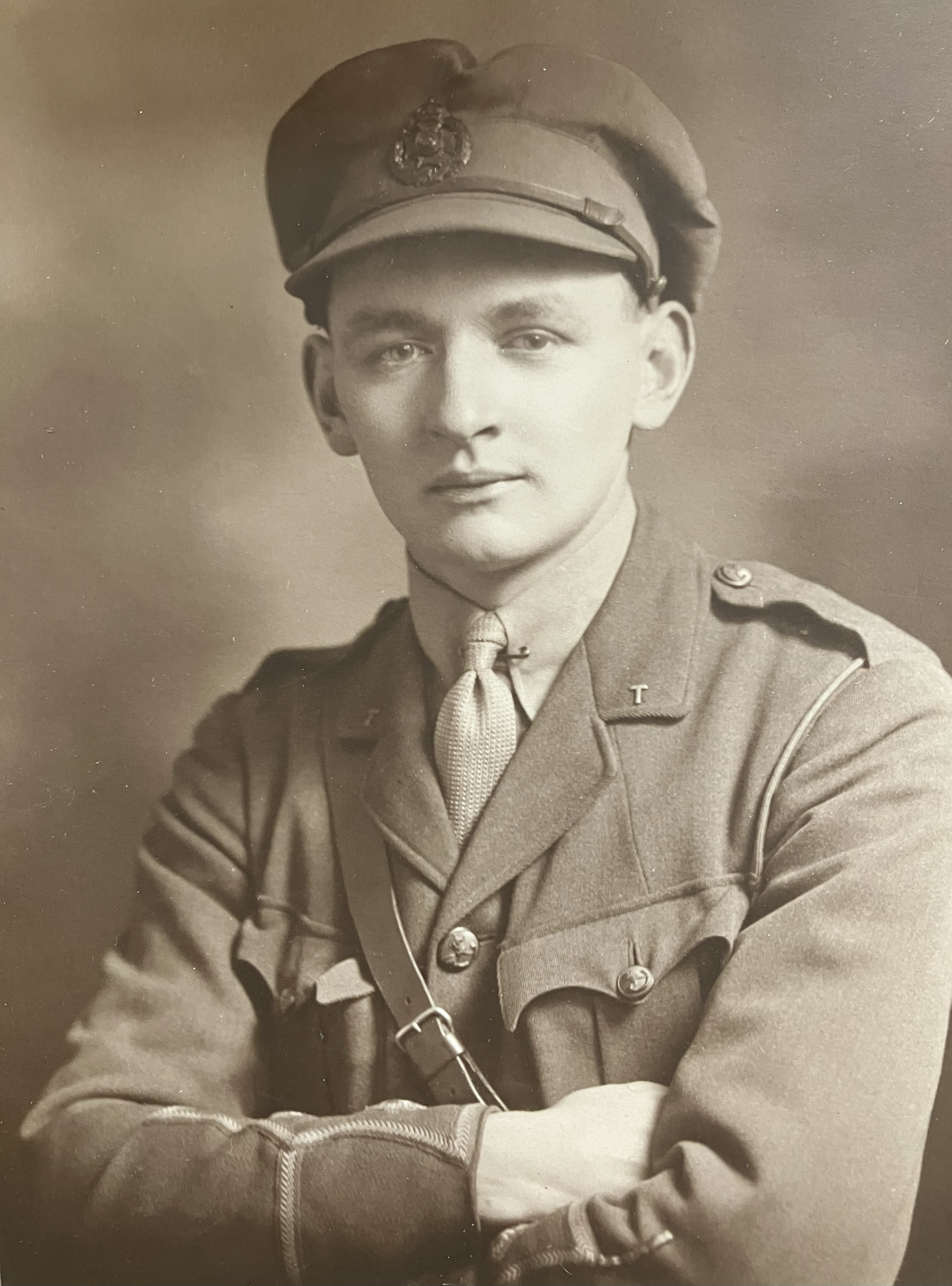
Harold after being commissioned as Second Lieutenant for the Leeds Rifles in 1914

Harold Boyes Watson MC (23 October 1893 – 19 March 1972) was an English first-class cricketer and an officer in both the British Army and the British Indian Army.

== Biography ==
Harold was born on 23 October 1893 at St Margarets, Middlesex. His father was Joshua Watson, (born 18 April 1863) and his mother was Annie Margaret Boyes, (born 23 May 1860) who combined their names to Boyes-Watson. His parents were school master and mistress at Swillington School on the edge of Leeds, where Harold went to school before going to Leeds Grammar School. Harold was a keen sportsman winning first prizes in the 100 yards race and broad jump in 1912, when the prize money was donated to the Lord Mayors Relief Fund for the coal strike. In 1912, he took up a place to study classics at Trinity College, Oxford. When the First World War broke out in 1914, he volunteered for the territorial force most closely associated with his school, the Leeds Rifles Prince of Wales' Own West Yorkshire Regiment.

He was commissioned on the 29 August 1914 as a second lieutenant with the 7th and 8th Battalions. He was second with the 26th Provisional Battalion in August 1915, and upon its disbandment prior to the Military Service Act 1916, he became liable for overseas service. He was injured in fighting in the Battle of the Somme in July 1916 and was repatriated to Kings College Hospital, Denmark Hill. After recovering he became a Bombing Instructor at Clipstone Camp, where he was mentioned in dispatches on 18 February 1917 for his bravery in dealing with a bomb dropped by a corporal under his instruction. He was promoted to the rank of lieutenant in November 1916, precedence from July 1916.

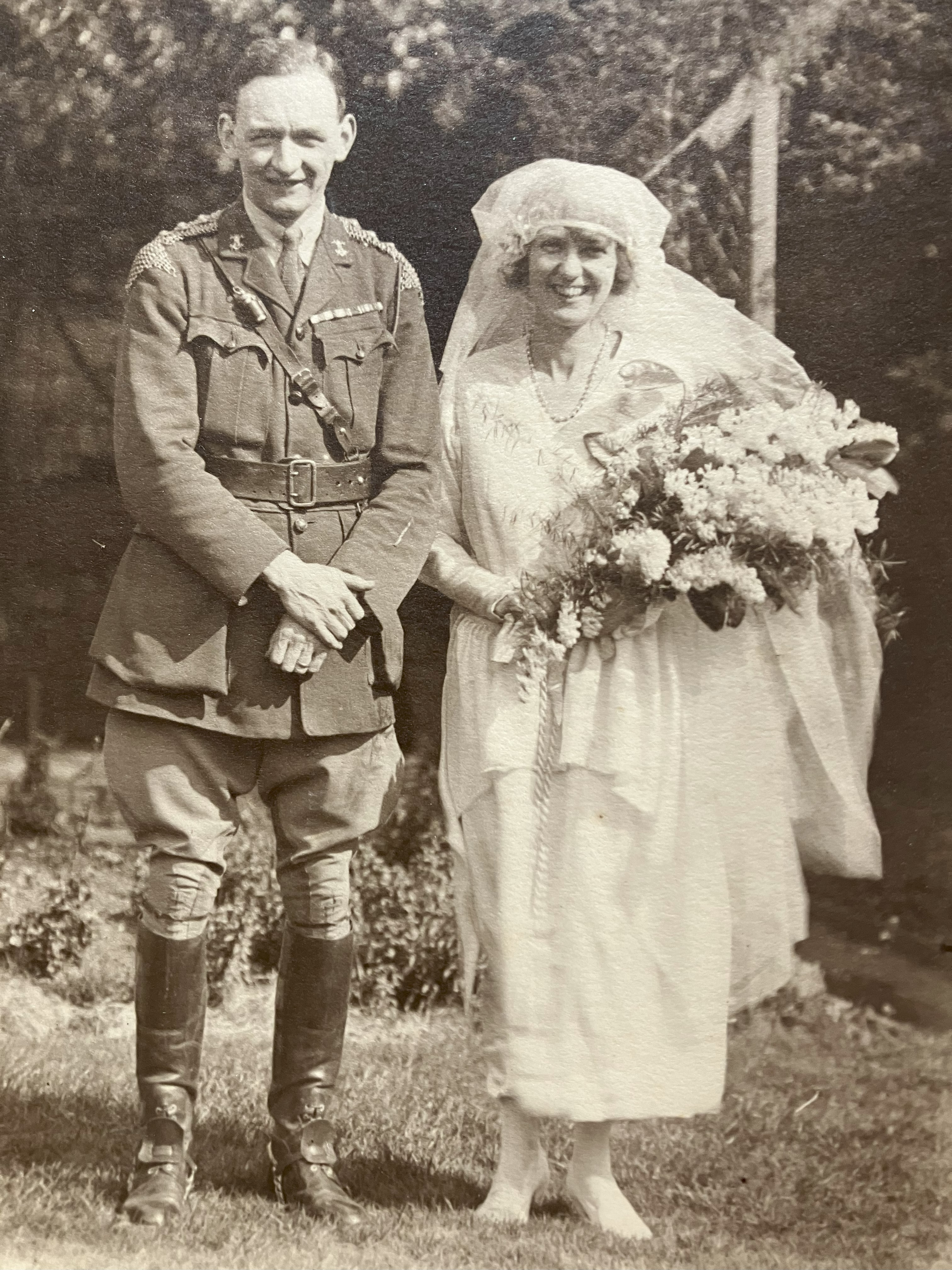
Harold and Hilda on their wedding day.

In May 1917, he was seconded for duty with the British Indian Army, where he served with 3rd Skinner's Horse. He saw action in Balochistan against the Marri and Khetran tribes in 1918. During a Marri attack on Gumbaz Fort on the night of 19–20 February 1918, Harold was one of four officer's and 75 men charged with the defence of the fort against a Marri force estimated at 3,000. For his actions in the successful defence, he was awarded the Military Cross. In March 1919, he was made a temporary captain.

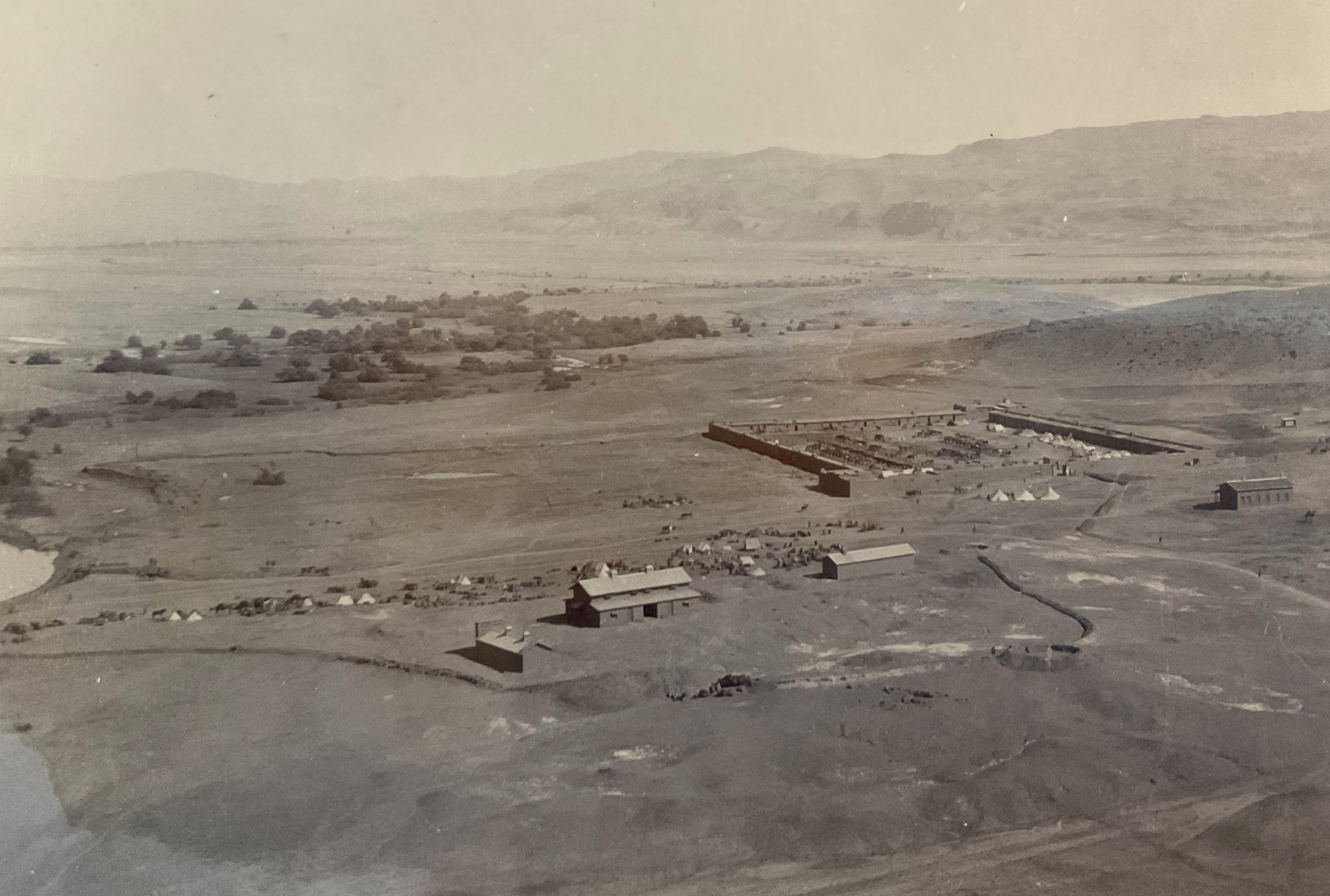
Gumbaz fort in a photo taken by Harold from the nearby hill

He returned to England in 1919 to complete his studies at Trinity College, Oxford. While studying at Oxford, he made a single appearance in first-class cricket for Oxford University against Australian Imperial Forces at Oxford in 1919. Batting once in the match, he scored 2 runs in the Oxford first innings before he was dismissed by Charlie Kelleway, while with the ball he took the wickets of Kelleway and Bert Oldfield in the Australian Imperial Forces first innings, conceding 35 runs. He relinquished his commission in the West Yorkshire Regiment in September 1921, retaining the rank of captain.

After graduating from Oxford, Harold embarked on a career in education starting as Assistant Master at his old school, Leeds Grammar School. He then worked as Technical Officer for Leeds Educational Authority from 1920 to 1924. On 31 March 1920 he married Hilda Cooper in West Bridgford, Nottingham. He moved to Nottingham as assistant director of the Education Authority 1924–27. He then worked as Assistant Education Officer in Birmingham 1927–31, before becoming Director of Education. He was appointed Director of Education for Southend in May 1931 and managed the evacuation of Southend's schools to Derbyshire during World War II. He continued as Director in Southend until his retirement on ill-health grounds in 1951. Harold died at the age of 78 in March 1972 at Thorpe Bay, Essex.
