= Maiwand (mountain) =

Mountain in Bavaria, Germany

Maiwand (Berg)
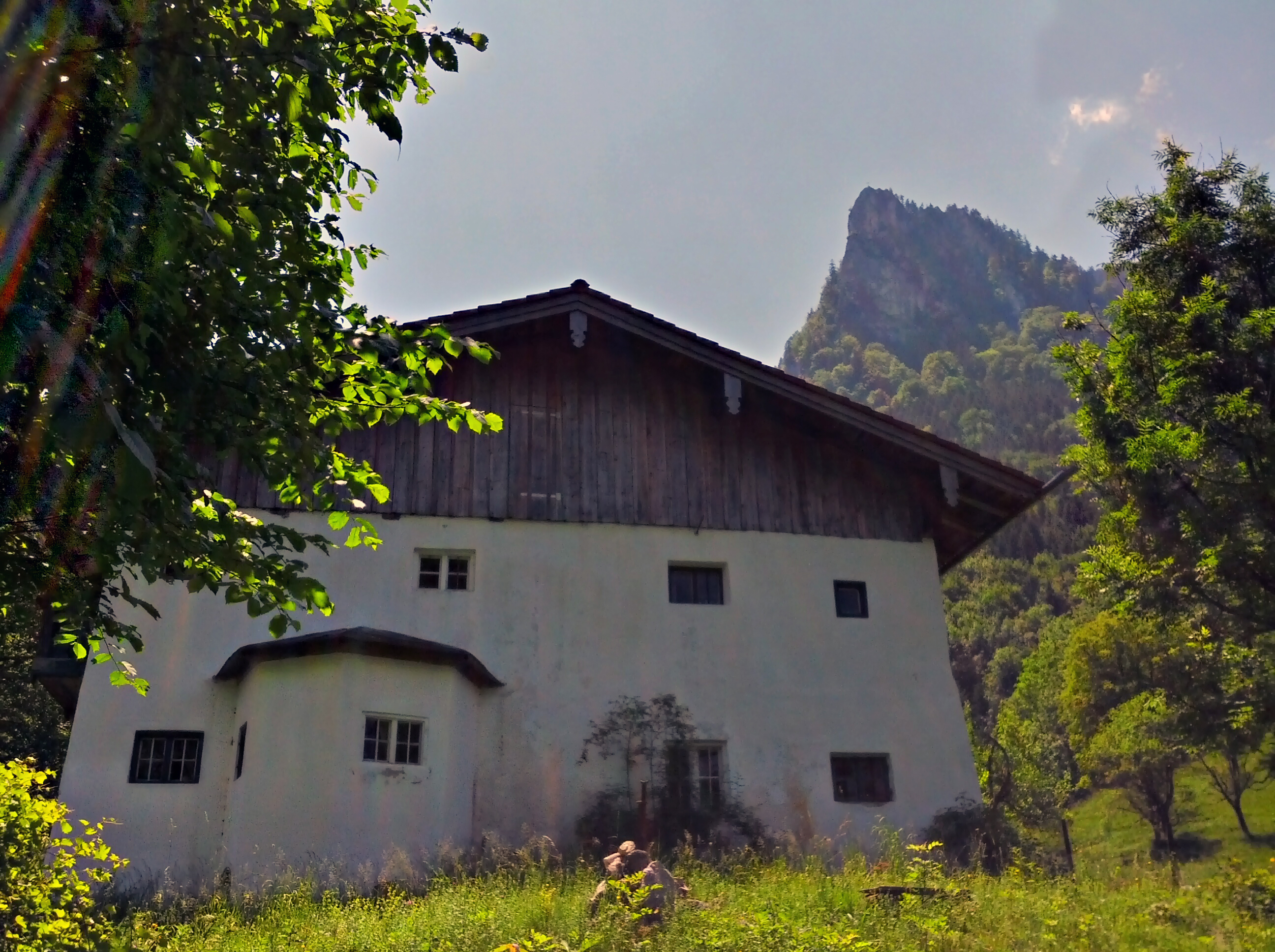
- Maiwand near Flintsbach, in the foreground the "Wagner am Berg" building

Highest point
- Elevation: 1,135 m (3,724 ft)
- Parent peak: Grosser Riesenkopf
- Coordinates: 47.70976°N 12.11363°E

Geography
- Location: Flintsbach, Bavaria, Germany
- Parent range: Mangfall Mountains

Maiwand (Berg) is a mountain in Flintsbach, of the Inntal valley, Bavaria, Germany, its peak altitude is of 1135 m (3723 ft.).

== Geology ==
The Maiwand is a Summit below the Riesenkopf mountain. It is located to the east of the Grosser Riesenkopf, in the Wendelsteingebiet of the Mangfall mountains in the Bavarian prealps. The rock on the Maiwand is mostly light-colored limestone from the lower and middle Jura, this rock can also be found on the top part of the Heuberg.

== Ascent ==
The easiest way up Maiwand, is through the southwest hiking path, although this is considered the easiest way, it is still rated a T5 of 6 on the SAC Hiking difficulty scale. Documented climbing routes exist leading up the east and south of the Maiwand, although they are considered to be far from easy and none are equipped with preinstalled safety measures.
