= Khetrani language =

Indo-Aryan language

Khetrani
- Native to: Pakistan
- Native speakers: over 100,000 (2017)
- Language family: Indo-European: Indo-Iranian; Indo-Aryan; Northwestern; Sindhi? Lahnda?; Khetrani

Language codes
- ISO 639-3: xhe
- Glottolog: khet1238
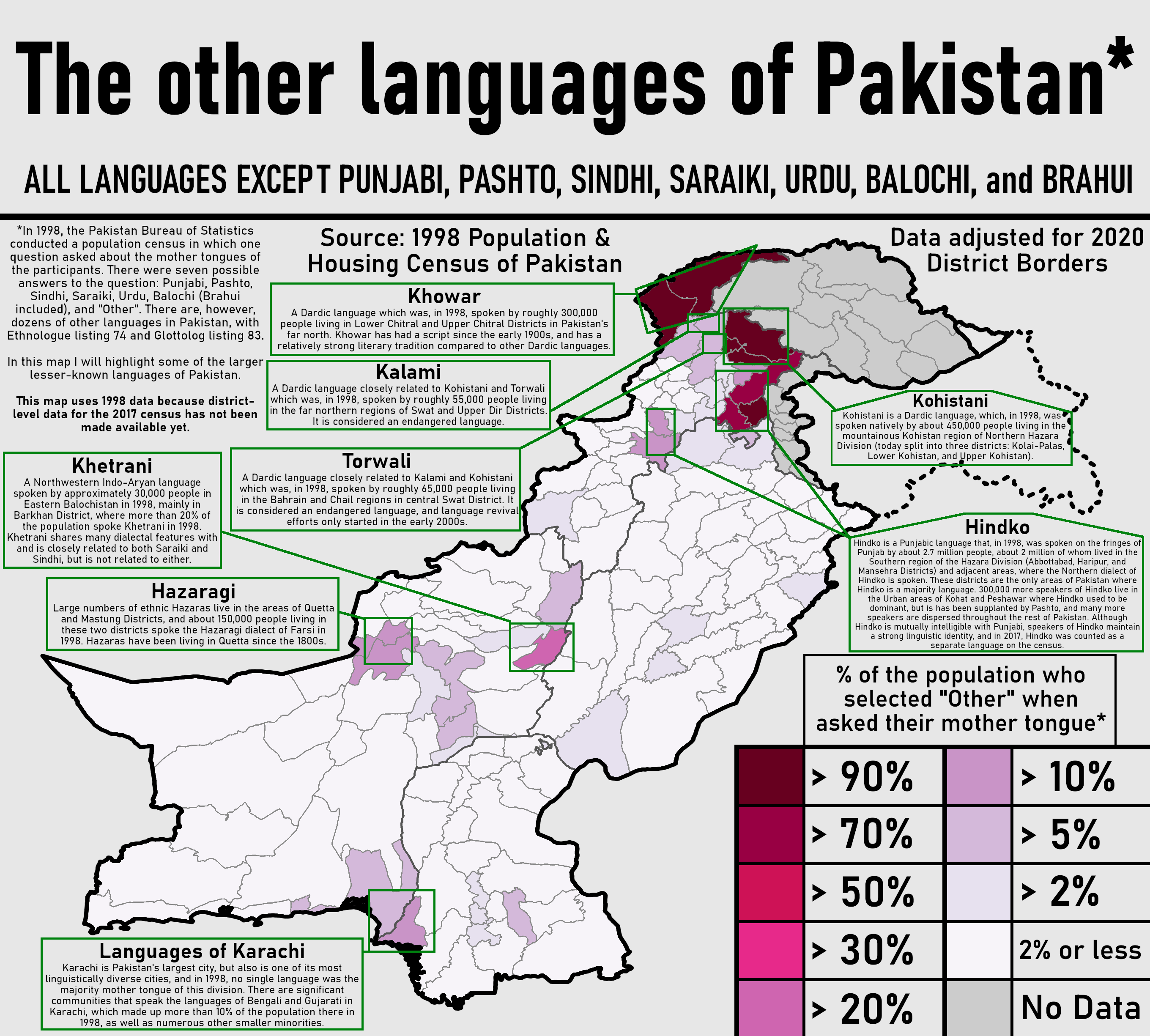
- Khetrani is a minor language of Pakistan which is mainly spoken in Barkhan District, it is given a space in this map.

Khetrānī, or Khetranki (کھیترانی, Khetrani pronunciation: [[kʰetɾɑːɳi]]), is an Indo-Aryan language of north-eastern Balochistan. It is spoken by the majority of the Khetrans, an ethnolinguistic tribe that occupies a hilly tract in the Sulaiman Mountains comprising the whole of Barkhan District as well as small parts of neighbouring Kohlu District to the south-west, and Musakhel District to the north. Alternative names for the language attested at the start of the 20th century are Barāzai and Jāfaraki.

Khetrani has grammatical features in common with both Sindhi and with Saraiki, but is not mutually intelligible with either. Khetrani has a relatively small number of Balochi loanwords in its vocabulary. Khetrani was formerly a dialect continuum of both Sindhi and Saraiki.

It is likely to have been formerly spoken over a wider area, which has been reduced with the expansion of Pashto from the north and Balochi from the south-east. The earlier suggestion that Khetrani might be a remnant of a Dardic language has been found "difficult to substantiate" by more detailed recent research.

== Phonology ==
=== Consonants ===
Khetrani Consonants
		Labial	Dental/Alveolar	Alveolo-Palatal	Velar	Glottal
Nasal		m	n	ɲ	ŋ	
Plosive	voiceless	p	t		k	ʔ
Plosive	aspirated	pʰ	tʰ		kʰ	
Plosive	voiced	b	d		ɡ	
Plosive	breathy	bʱ	dʱ		ɡʱ	
Affricate	voiceless		ts	tɕ		
Affricate	aspirated		tsʰ	tɕʰ		
Affricate	voiced		dz	dʑ		
Affricate	breathy		dzʱ	dʑʱ		
Fricative	voiceless	f	s	ɕ		h
Fricative	voiced	v	z	ʑ		ɦ
Lateral			l			

=== Vowels ===
Khetrani Vowels
	Front		Central	Back
	Unrounded	Rounded	Central	Back
Close	/i/	/y/		/u/
Close-mid	/e/	/ø/	/ə/	/o/
Open-mid	/ɛ/	/œ/	/ə/	/ɔ/
Open			/a/	

== History ==
The Khetrans. It is certain that the whole of the triangular block of hill now occupied by the Marris was in the possession of Indian tribes before the Baloch invasion. They were gradually destroyed or absorbed by the Baloch from the south and the Afghans from the north and such names as Shahdedja among the Marris and Haripal among the Afghans to the north indicate that fragments of these tribes remain among the Baloch and the Afghans. The Khetrans however between the Afghan and the Baloch have preserved their identity and their peculiar Indian dialect to the present day.

== Bibliography ==
- Birmani, Ali H.; Ahmed, Fasih (2017). "Language of the Khetrans of Barkhan of Pakistani Balochistan: A preliminary description". Lingua. 191–192: 3–21. doi:10.1016/j.lingua.2016.12.003. ISSN 0024-3841.
- Elfenbein, Joseph H. (1994). "Notes on Khetrāni phonology". Studien zur Indologie und Iranistik. 19: 71–82. ISSN 0341-4191.
- Grierson, George A. (1919). Linguistic Survey of India. Vol. VIII, Part 1, Indo-Aryan family. North-western group. Specimens of Sindhī and Lahndā. Calcutta: Office of the Superintendent of Government Printing, India.
- Masica, Colin P. (1991). The Indo-Aryan languages. Cambridge language surveys. Cambridge University Press. ISBN 978-0-521-23420-7.
- Minchin, C.F. (1907). Loralai District. Baluchistan district gazetteers. Vol. 2. Allahabad: Pioneer Press.
