= Marri-Bugti Country =

Tribal region during the British occupation of Baluchistan

- Autonomous Chieftain of Baloch
- 1877–14 October 1955
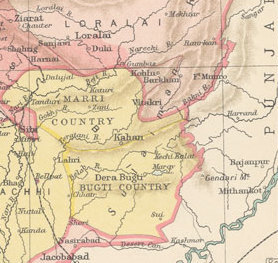
- Map of Pakistan with Marri-Bugti Country highlighted
- Capital: Sibi
- Area
- 7,129 km^{2} (2,753 sq mi)
- History
  - Established: 1877
  - Disestablished: 14 October 1955
- Today part of: Pakistan

Marri-Bugti Country (Marri and Bugti Country) was a tribal region during the period of British colonial rule in Baluchistan. Marris and Bugtis are the prevalent Baloch tribes in the Balochistan. The Marris own 8,460 square kilometres (3,268 sq mi) in the north, while the Bugtis own 10,000 square kilometres (3,861 sq mi) in the south. Today, the region is divided into three districts: Kohlu, Dera Bugti and Sibi.

== History ==
The Marris and Bugtis first met the British when a Major Billamore entered their territory during the First Anglo-Afghan War. In April 1840, Captain Lewis Brown was sent to occupy Kahan but surrendered to Marri Chief Doda Khan five months later. Meanwhile, Bugtis had trouble with Sir Charles Napier and General John Jacob came greater trouble with both tribes. In 1845 after the treaty was signed which shows that both tribes were supported financially by Khan of Kalat.

== Demographics ==
By 1901, the total population of the Country was around 39,000, of which 19,000 or so were Marri, 18,500 Bugti, and 415 Hindu. Most inhabitants were nomadic.

The Marris were divided into three sub-clans: the Bijarani, Gazaini, Loharani.

The Bugti clans were Pairozani Nothani, Durragh Nothani, Kalpar, Habibani, Mondrani, Shambhani Mareta, Masori and Rahija.

Religious groups in Marri-Bugti Country (British Baluchistan era)
Religious group	1901		1911		1921		1931		1941	
Religious group	Pop.	%	Pop.	%	Pop.	%	Pop.	%	Pop.	%
Islam	38,507	98.94%	34,395	98.93%	36,730	99.21%	54,903	99.42%	57,831	99.52%
Hinduism	412	1.06%	371	1.07%	294	0.79%	321	0.58%	281	0.48%
Sikhism	0	0%	0	0%	0	0%	0	0%	0	0%
Christianity	0	0%	0	0%	0	0%	0	0%	0	0%
Zoroastrianism	0	0%	0	0%	0	0%	0	0%	0	0%
Judaism	0	0%	0	0%	0	0%	0	0%	0	0%
Jainism	0	0%	0	0%	0	0%	0	0%	0	0%
Buddhism	—N/a	—N/a	0	0%	0	0%	0	0%	0	0%
Tribal	—N/a	—N/a	—N/a	—N/a	—N/a	—N/a	0	0%	0	0%
Others	0	0%	0	0%	0	0%	0	0%	0	0%
Total population	38,919	100%	34,766	100%	37,024	100%	55,224	100%	58,112	100%
Note: Marri-Bugti Country formed part of Sibi District during the British Baluchistan era.

== See also ==
- Operations against the Marri and Khetran tribes

== Bibliography ==
- Ahmed, Mukhtar (25 October 2014), Ancient Pakistan - an Archaeological History, ISBN 9781495966439
- (Pakistan), Baluchistan (1979), Balochistan Through the Ages: Geography and history
- (Pakistan), Baluchistan (1907), Baluchistan District Gazetteer Series: Sibi
- Cotton, James Sutherland; Burn, Sir Richard; Meyer, Sir William Stevenson (1908), Imperial Gazetteer of India
- Possehl, Gregory L. (1999), Indus age: the beginnings, ISBN 9780812234176
- World Writers on Pakistan, 1968
- Sarkar, Jayanta; Ghosh, G. C. (2003), Populations of the SAARC Countries: Bio-cultural Perspectives, ISBN 9788120725621
- Stewart, John (1989), Envoy of the Raj, ISBN 9781870304030
- Manchanda, Rita (16 March 2015), SAGE Series in Human Rights Audits of Peace Processes: Five-Volume Set, ISBN 9789351502135
- Census Commissioner, India (1923), Census of India, 1921: Baluchistan
- Dutta, Simanti (2002), Imperial Mappings, ISBN 9788176462365
