= Großer Riesenkopf =

Mountain in Bavaria, Germany

Coordinates: 47°43′N 12°07′E

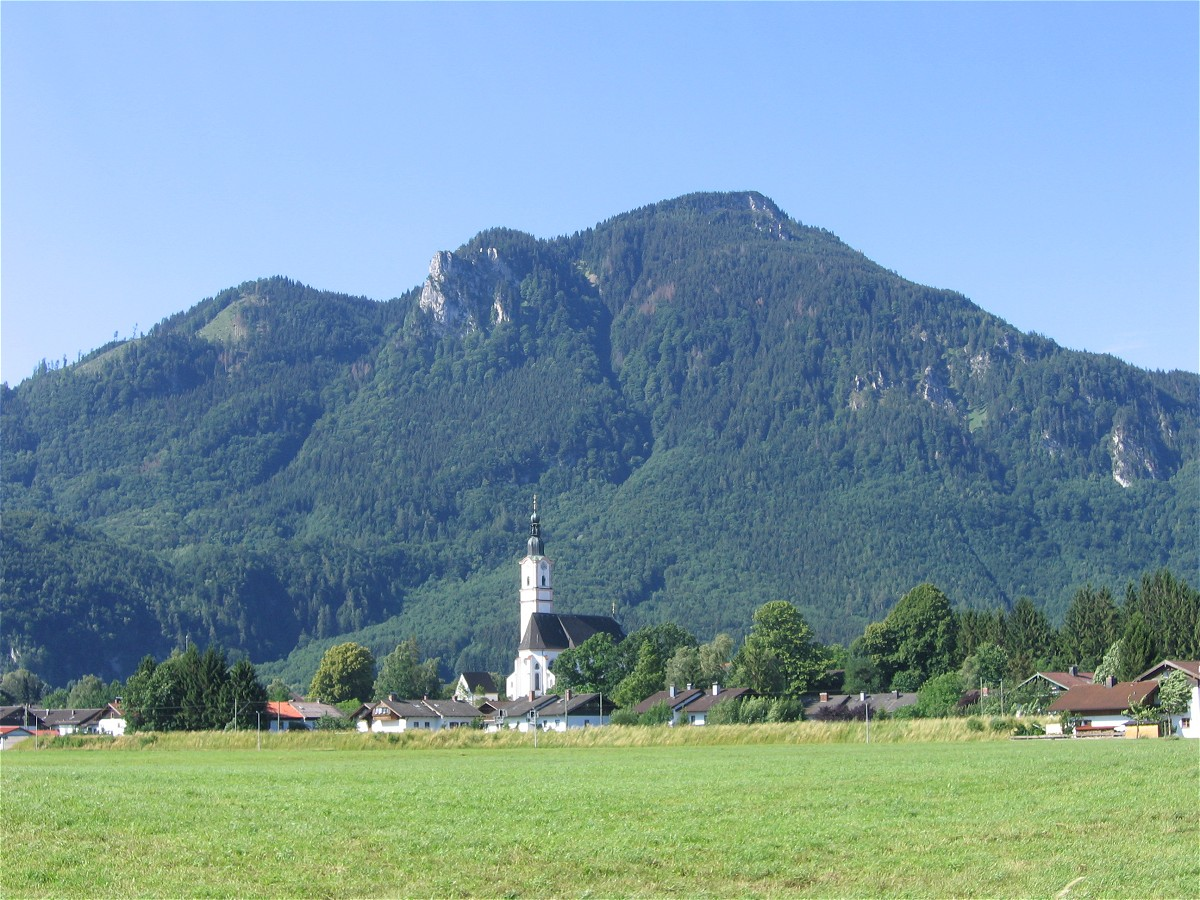

Highest point
- Elevation: 1,337 m (4,386 ft)

Geography
- Location: Bavaria, Germany

Großer Riesenkopf (literally, "Big Giant Head") is a mountain in Bavaria, Germany, southeast of the municipality of Flintsbach. It rises to 1337m in the Mangfall Mountains at the far east of the Bavarian Prealps.
