= 47th Brigade (United Kingdom) =

Military unit

The 47th Brigade was a formation of British Army. It was part of the new army also known as Kitchener's Army. It was assigned to the 16th (Irish) Division and served on the Western Front during the First World War. Philip Miles of the Indian Army briefly commanded this brigade.

As the 47th (London) Brigade, it was part of the 56th London Division/District in the 1960s.

== Units in the First World War ==
The infantry battalions did not all serve at once, but all were assigned to the brigade during the war.

- 6th Battalion, Royal Irish Regiment
- 6th Battalion, Connaught Rangers
- 7th Battalion, Leinster Regiment
- 8th Battalion, Royal Munster Fusiliers
- 1st Battalion, Royal Munster Fusiliers
- 2nd Battalion, Leinster Regiment
- 14th Battalion, Leicestershire Regiment
- 6/7th Battalion, Royal Scots Fusiliers
- 9th Battalion, Black Watch
- 18th Battalion, Welsh Regiment
- 47th Machine Gun Company
- 47th Trench Mortar Battery
