= Richard Wapshare =

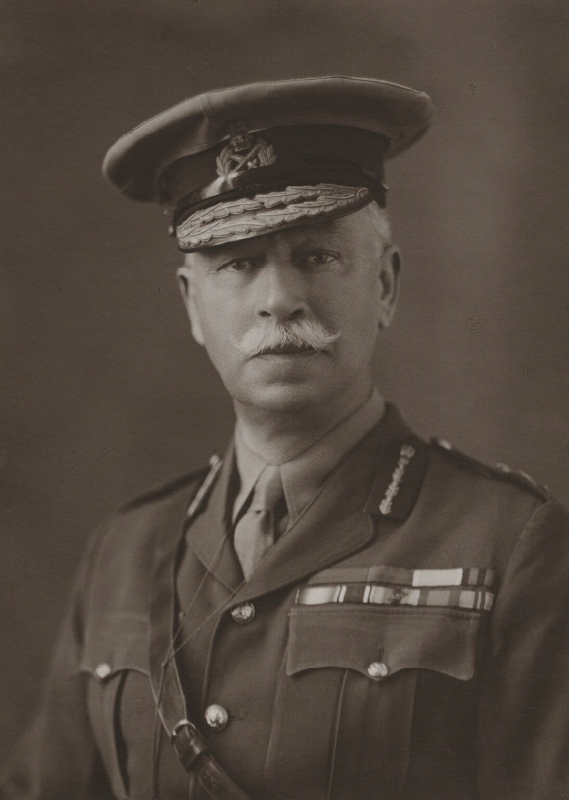
- Born: January 1860; Ooty, Pudukkottai State, British Raj
- Died: 23 December 1932 (aged 72); Cheltenham, England, United Kingdom
- Military career
- Allegiance: United Kingdom; British India
- Branch: British Army; British Indian Army
- Service years: 1880 — 1925
- Rank: Lieutenant General
- Commands: Bangalore Brigade; 6th Poona Divisional Area; 9th (Secunderabad) Division; 9th (Secunderabad) Cavalry Brigade
- Conflicts: Third Anglo-Burmese War; World War I; East African campaign; Battle of Tanga; Battle of Jassin; North-West Frontier; Marri Punitive Expedition; Third Anglo-Afghan War

Sir Richard Wapshare, KCIE, CB, CSI (1860–1932) was a British Lieutenant General in the Indian Army. He served in the East African campaign during World War I and participated in the battles of Tanga and Jassin. He also took part in the Operations against the Marri and Khetran tribes in 1918.

== Biography ==
Wapshare was born in Ooty in January 1860, the youngest son of William Henry Wapshare (1814–1864), an officer in the Indian Army, and Emma Elizabeth (1818–1905), daughter of Rev. William Chester, a minister in Wales and subsequently in India. He began his education in Germany. In February 1880 he was gazetted lieutenant in the Royal Marine Light Infantry, however in November 1882 transferred to the 14th Native Infantry of the Bombay Army. In 1884 he transferred to the Hyderabad Contingent where he would remain for the rest of his regimental service. He served in the 4th Cavalry and 3rd Cavalry regiments and participated in the Third Anglo-Burmese War.

On 18 May 1903 he was granted the temporary rank of lieutenant colonel whilst employed as commander of an Indian regiment.

In 1906, he was Assistant Adjutant-General at the Army Headquarters at Simla and remained there until 1910 when he was assigned to the Saugor Cavalry School. In 1912 he joined the Secunderabad Cavalry and later in the year transferred to the Bangalore Brigade.

When World War I broke out, Wapshare served in the East African campaign as part of the Indian Expeditionary Force. As a major general, having been promoted to that rank on 5 March 1915, he commanded a brigade in the Battle of Tanga, ending in a British defeat. He was described by Richard Meinertzhagen as a "dear fatherly old gentleman, kind and considerate" but "he has little military instinct and is nervous of all responsibility, maybe because he is hopelessly ignorant on all subjects connected to his profession". Wapshare then participated in the Battle of Jassin only to end in another British defeat. He was made a Companion of the Order of the Bath in the 1915 Birthday Honours in June 1915, a Companion of the Order of the Star of India in May 1918 and a Knight Commander of the Order of the Indian Empire in July 1920.

Later, back in India, he participated in the Operations against the Marri and Khetran tribes and the Third Anglo-Afghan War and retired in 1925.

He died on 23 December 1932 in Cheltenham.
