= Maiwand TV =

Television channel in Afghanistan

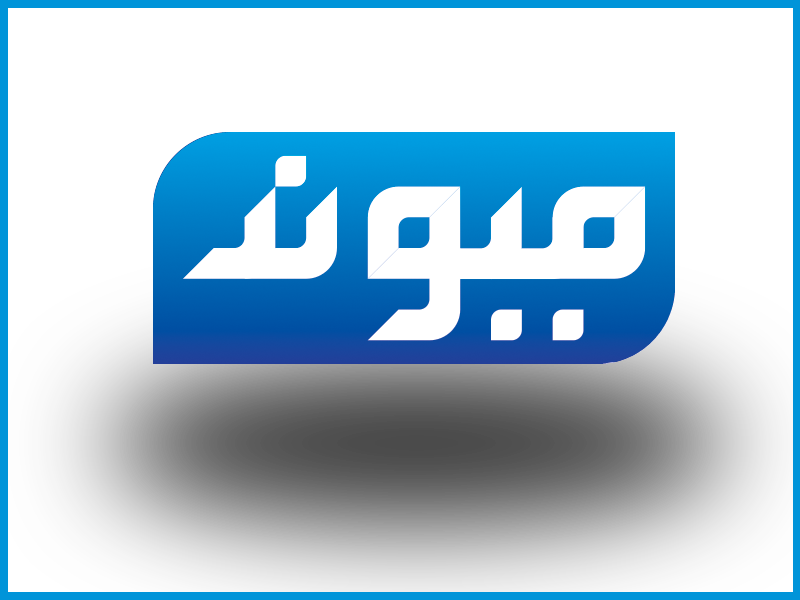
- Country: Afghanistan

Programming
- Picture format: SDTV

Links
- Website: http://www.maiwandtv.com/fa/

Maiwand TV (Persian: تلویزیون میوند) is a television network channel in Kabul, Afghanistan.

== See also ==
- Television in Afghanistan
- Mass media in Afghanistan
