= Flintsbach =

Flintsbach am Inn
- Municipality
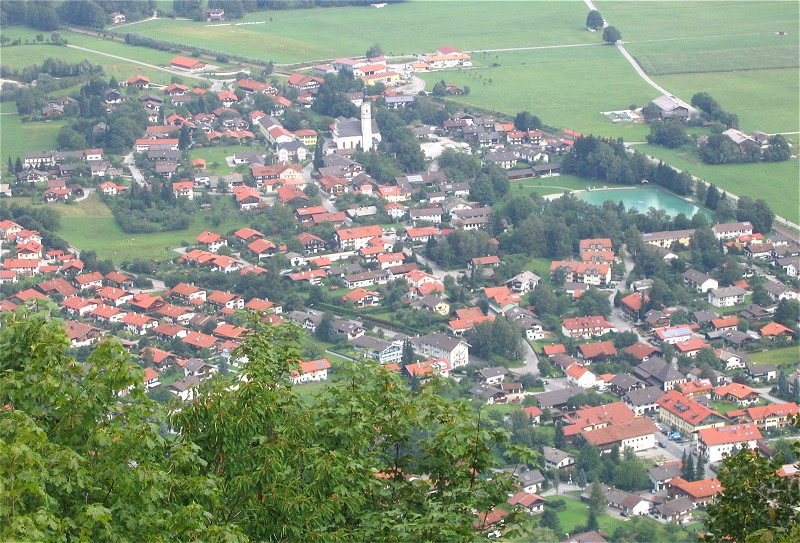
- Flintsbach seen from Petersberg

- Coat of arms

- Location of Flintsbach am Inn within Rosenheim district
- Interactive map of Flintsbach am Inn
- Location within Germany Location within Bavaria
- Coordinates: 47°43′N 12°08′E
- Country: Germany
- State: Bavaria
- Admin. region: Oberbayern
- District: Rosenheim

Government
  - Mayor (2020–26): Stefan Lederwascher (CSU)

Area
  - Total: 31.3 km^{2} (12.1 sq mi)
- Elevation: 479 m (1,572 ft)

Population (2025-12-31)
  - Total: 2,924
  - Density: 93.4/km^{2} (242/sq mi)
- Time zone: UTC+01:00 (CET)
  - Summer (DST): UTC+02:00 (CEST)
- Postal codes: 83126
- Dialling codes: 08034
- Vehicle registration: RO
- Website: www.flintsbach.de

Flintsbach am Inn (German pronunciation: [ˈflɪntsbax ʔam ˈʔɪn], lit. 'Flintsbach on the Inn'; Central Bavarian: Flinschboch a.Inn) is a municipality in the district of Rosenheim in Bavaria in Germany, on the river Inn.
