= Marri (tribe) =

Tribe in Balochistan, Pakistan

The Marri are a Balochi-speaking tribe of the Baloch people, who inhabit a large arid region in northeastern Balochistan, Pakistan. The Marri area is bounded to the west by the plains of Sibi. To the north are the Kakar and Loni tribes of the Pashtuns; to the east lie the lands of the Khetrans, to the south the Bugti tribe.

Traditionally, the Marri people, like other Baloch tribes, were nomadic and earned their livelihood primarily from animal herding, fighting and raiding. Many of them hold key high positions in Pakistan both in Provincial and Federal levels of Government.

== Early history ==
Marri tribe is divided into 3 sub-tribes 1 Gazani 2 Loharani and 3 bijarani. when Mir Chakar Khan, the folk hero of many Baloch romances and leader of the Rind tribe and confederacy. After his quarrels with the Lasharies, and after he had been driven out of Sibi, Mir Chakar went to Satghara Punjab near okara there is present tomb of Mir Chakar Rind.

The particular spot where Bijar Khan parted ranks from Mir Chakar has been known as Bijar Wad. After that the marri tribe removed themselves frim the rind confederacy.

The sub-tribes of Gazini:

1. Bahawalanzai (Chief Nawab Changez Khan Marri)
2. Chief of Marri:Haji khair Muhammad Rahzan
3. Mehandani (Chief Mir Alam Zaib Mahanadani Marri)
4. Langhani (Chief Wadera Dost Ali)
5. Zing (Chief Wadera Rab Nawaz Zing)
6. Jarwar Many of Jarwar still live in their native place near Kahan, Balochistan but they are now mainly split into various groups and living in various regions of Balochistan, Sindh and South Punjab provinces of Pakistan, Afghanistan and Iran.
7. Aaliani (Chief Wadera Mirzihan)
8. Tagani (Chief Wadera Ali Gul)
9. Nozbadgani (Chief Haji Khair Mohammad Rahzin)
10. Chalgari (Chief Wadera Sharbat Khan)
11. Badini (Chief Wadera Soba Khan)
12. Mazarani (Chief Wadera Qadir Khan)

The sub-tribes of Bijarani:

1. Qalandrani (Mir Mohabat Khan Marri)
2. Misrizai (Mir Ahmed Khan)
3. Kalwani (Wadera Ghulam Hussain Matiari Sindh)
4. Shaheja (Wadera mehrab khan)
5. Pavadi (Wadera Karim dad Diva khan)
6. Ramkani (Wadera Safar Khan)
7. Soomrani (Wadera Mir Miro khan Marri)

The sub-tribes of Loharani:

1. Chief of Loharani (Chief Wadera Bhotar Khan)
2. Sherani (Wadera Habib)
3. Mohmadani (Wadera Sohbat Khan)
4. Jalambani (Wadera Mian Khan)
5. Gowasrani
6. Loharani (Wadera Haibat Khan)

== See also ==
- Marri-Bugti Country
- Operations against the Marri and Khetran tribes
