= Musakhel (Pashtun tribe) =

Ghilji Pashtun tribe

The Musa Khel, or Moosa Khel (Pashto: موساخېل) is a Pashtun tribe of Panni origin. They are a sub-clan of the Panni tribe. The tribe resides in the tribal range of Musakhel Shangla (mostly in Puran tehsil and few in Chakesar) and Batagram Districts in the Khyber-Pakhtunkhwa province of Pakistan. They also reside in the Khost and Ghazni provinces of Afghanistan. The Musakhel originally migrated from Ghazni province, Afghanistan. Musakhel in Mianwali district of Punjab borders the district of the southern Pashtun belt. It separates the Pashtun belt from the Baloch belt and Punjab (Tunsa)

== Culture and Traditions ==
The Musakhel are a respected branch of the Panni tribe, one of the well-known clans of the Gharghasht Pashtuns. For centuries, they have lived in the rugged mountains and foothills of the Sulaiman Range, preserving their independence, tribal identity, and ancient traditions. Throughout history, the Musakhel have been recognized for their bravery, honor, resilience, and unwavering commitment to the Pashtun code of life, Pashtunwali.

According to Pashtun tribal tradition, the Panni tribe traces its ancestry to Qais Abdur Rashid, the legendary forefather of the Pashtuns. This lineage remains an important part of the tribe's cultural identity and heritage.

The Musakhel are renowned for living by the principles of Pashtunwali, including Jirga (tribal council), Melmastia (hospitality), Nanawatai (granting refuge), loyalty, honor, courage, justice, and the defense of one's homeland and tribe. These values have shaped their identity for generations and continue to define the tribe today.

Historically, the Musakhel have earned a reputation as fearless warriors who never compromised on their freedom, dignity, or ancestral land. During the British colonial period, like many Pashtun tribes, Musakhel tribesmen took part in resistance against colonial expansion and defended their homeland with determination.

== History ==
During the reigns of Sultan Ibrahim Lodi and Emperor Sher Shah Suri, many members of the wider Panni tribe migrated to different parts of the Indian subcontinent, including present-day Pakistan, India, and Bangladesh, where they served in military, administrative, and local leadership roles.

Pashtun tribal traditions also state that Panni warriors fought in various military campaigns during the era of Mahmud of Ghazni. Some tribal narratives further claim that Panni forces reached lands as far west as the Roman world. These accounts form part of the tribe's oral heritage, although they are not fully verified by mainstream historical scholarship.

== Geography ==
Today, the Musakhel are found across Pakistan—especially in Musakhel District, Sibi, Loralai, Zhob, and parts of Khyber Pakhtunkhwa—as well as in Afghanistan, including Herat, Ghor, Kandahar, and Ghazni. Many Musakhel families also live abroad while proudly preserving their tribal identity, customs, and traditions.

The Musakhel are more than a tribe—they represent a legacy of courage, honor, loyalty, hospitality, and unity. Their history and traditions continue to inspire future generations, making them one of the respected Pashtun tribal communities.

"Honor is our identity. Courage is our tradition. Hospitality is our pride. Pashtunwali is our way of life. Freedom is our legacy. This is the spirit of the Musakhel Panni."
