= Philip Miles (Indian Army officer) =

Brigadier-General Philip John Miles, CB, CMG, FRGS, (23 December 1864 – 26 December 1948) was a British officer of the Indian Army during the late nineteenth and early twentieth century. After an early career serving on the North-West Frontier and in Central Asia, he rose to command brigades during the First World War and the Third Anglo-Afghan War.

== Early life and career ==
Miles was born on 23 December 1864, the eldest son of a rural curate. His father, Philip John Miles, was the curate of Little Bytham in Lincolnshire, and had married Elinor Sarah Jex-Blake, a clergyman's daughter, on 3 February of the same year.

After being educated at Shrewsbury School, Miles joined the Royal Marine Light Infantry in 1885 but, after two years service, transferred to the Indian Army as an officer in the 45th (Rattrays) Sikhs. He served in the Hazara Expedition of 1888, the First Miranzai Expedition of 1891, and in China during the Boxer Rebellion in 1900.

Around the turn of the century, Miles was posted to special duties in the Gilgit Agency, on the Chinese-Indian border, and then as the "Temporary Assistant to the Resident at Srinagar on Chinese Affairs" in Kashgar, Chinese Turkestan, now western Xinjiang. Here, he served as the British resident diplomat and official in far western China, and as "Colonel Miles" is mentioned several times by travellers of the period.

== Senior command ==
After his return to regular duties, he served with the Malakand Field Force during the Mohmand expedition of 1908, where he was mentioned in despatches and promoted to a brevet lieutenant-colonel. He was promoted to command the 51st Sikhs (Frontier Force) in 1909, with a substantive promotion to Colonel in 1913, and relinquished command of the regiment in 1914.

Miles, who on 24 September 1914 was promoted to the temporary rank of brigadier general, briefly commanded a New Army brigade of Irish volunteer troops, the 47th Brigade of 16th (Irish) Division, in France from December 1915 to January 1916. His younger brother, Henry, was at the time a temporary second lieutenant in one battalion of the brigade, the 6th Connaught Rangers; he would be killed in action at the Somme in July 1916.

In 1917, Miles returned to India, where he led a column in the Operations against the Marri and Khetran tribes, for which he was made a Companion of the Order of St. Michael and St. George.

Miles' last military service was to command a brigade in the Waziristan campaign of 1919; he retired in December of that year, with the honorary rank of Brigadier-General.
