= Maiwand, Pakistan =

Mawand is a village located in the Kohlu District of Balochistan, Pakistan. With a population of approximately 5000 people, it is located in district Kohlu and previously it was NCB division It is the place where the first helicopter to start the counter-insurgency operations landed. A fort housing the Frontier Corpsmen and officers also existed there but was destroyed in an earthquake.

At one time in 1991–92, Kahan, the headquarters of the Marri tribe was controlled from Maiwand Rifles '70 Wing headquarters, also located there. At that time, 71 wing located at Kahan was employed in Sind on anti dacoits duties. Wing Commander Captain Mustafa Zaidi, popularly known as Capt Zaidi, developed intimate contact with local Sardars of Maiwand and Kahan. The local waderas and common people enjoyed respect from him and he was known well in the areas deep inside the tribal territory.

An electricity line was completed during the tenure of Capt Zaidi, who had been successful in winning the hearts of quite a number of fararis, including Rahim Khan, the personal bodyguard of Nawab Khair Bux Marri. The Wing Commander, Capt Zaidi enjoyed very good relations with Late Nawab Kaiser Khan, the elder brother of Nawab Khair Bux. Kaiser Khan never met with any government official, and even declined meeting with Chief Secretary and Inspector General Frontier Corps Maj General Zafar Mehdi, but frequently visited the fort to meet with Capt Zaidi.

In Mawand there are six sub tribes: Badazai, Waderazai, Sydalizai, Jalalhanzai, Sultanzai, and Balochanzai.
