= Ladakh =

Union territory administered by India

- Region administered by India as a union territory
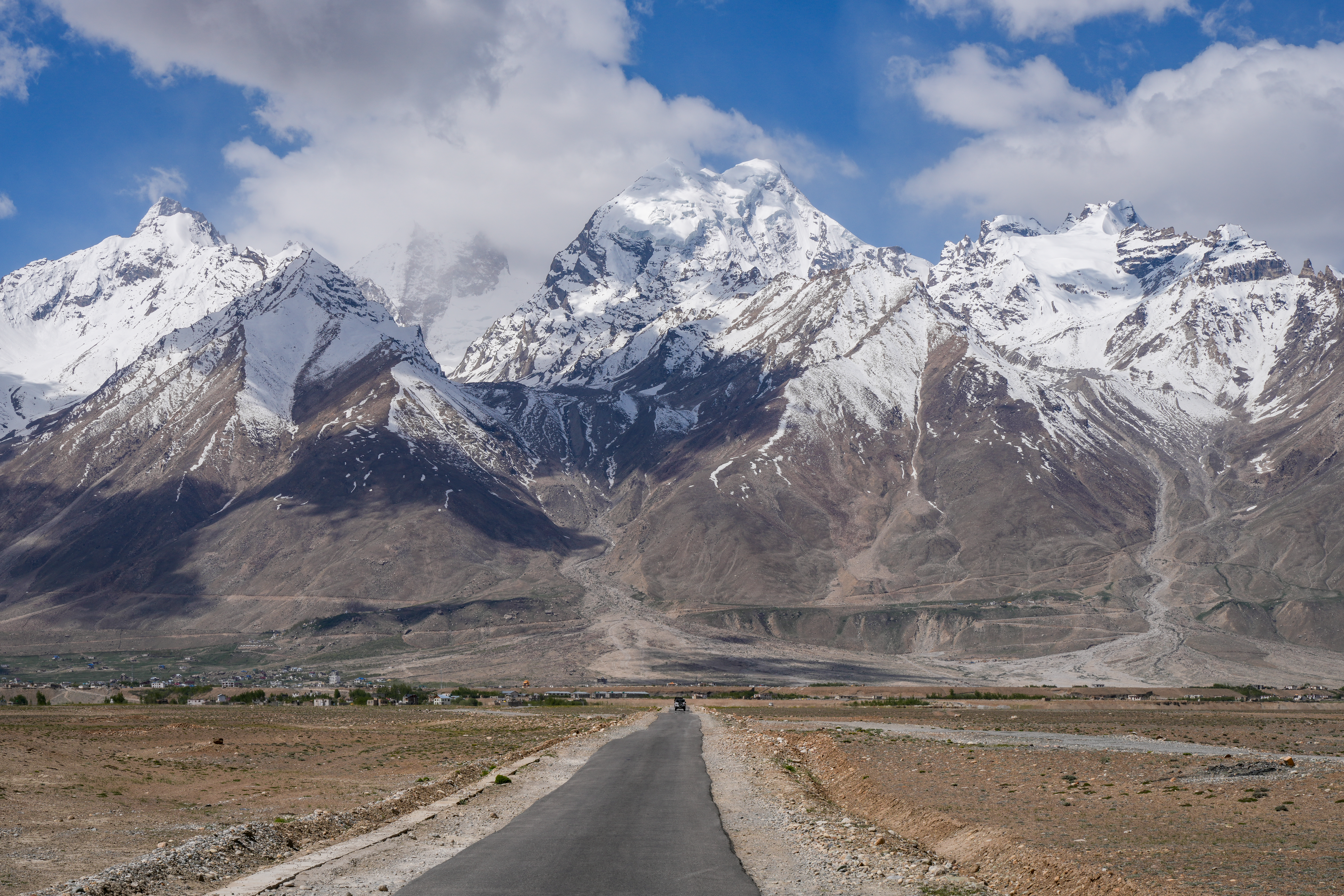
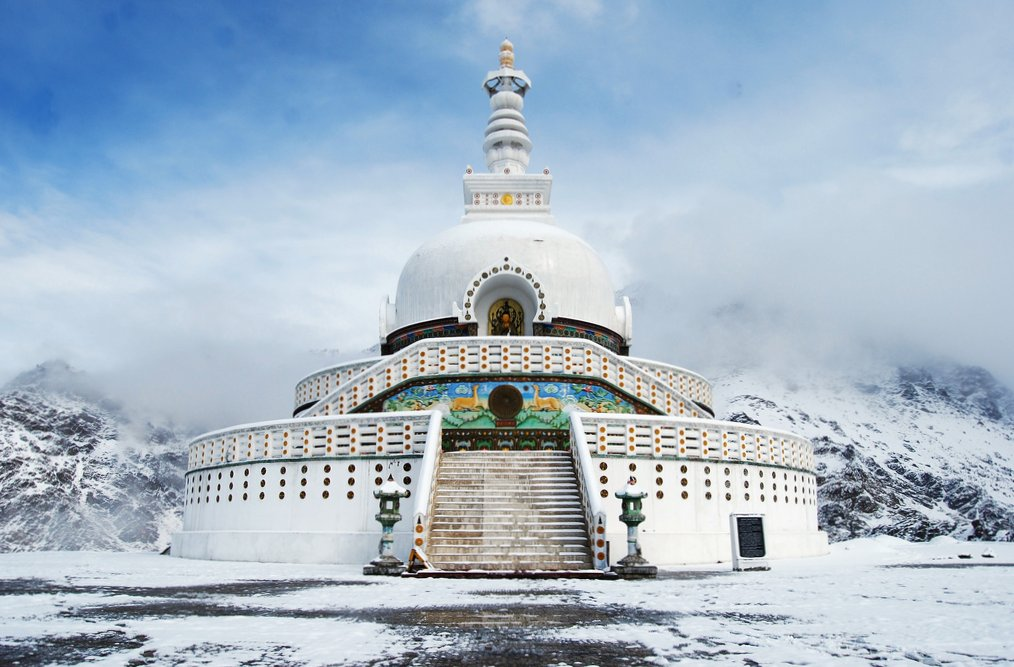
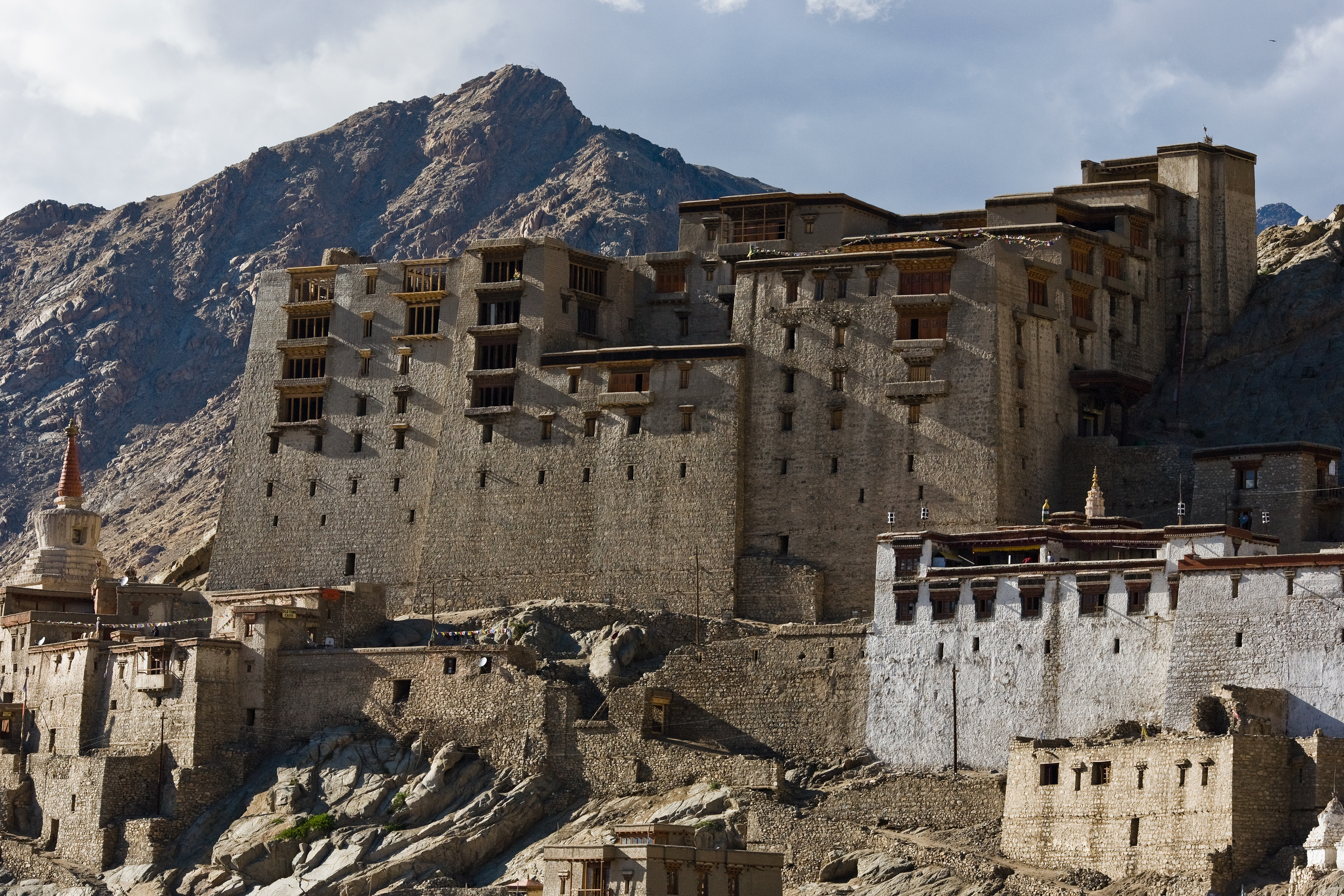
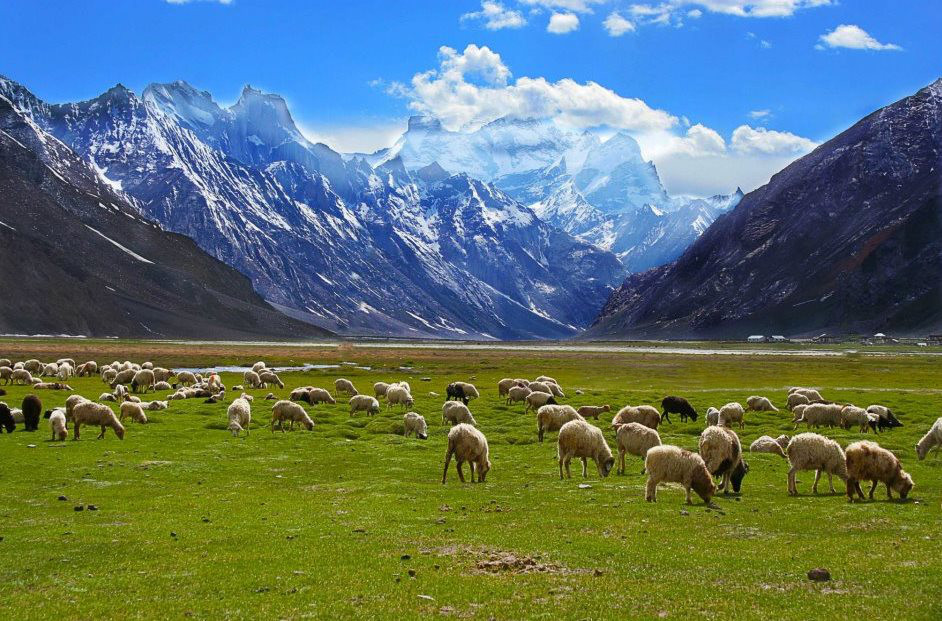
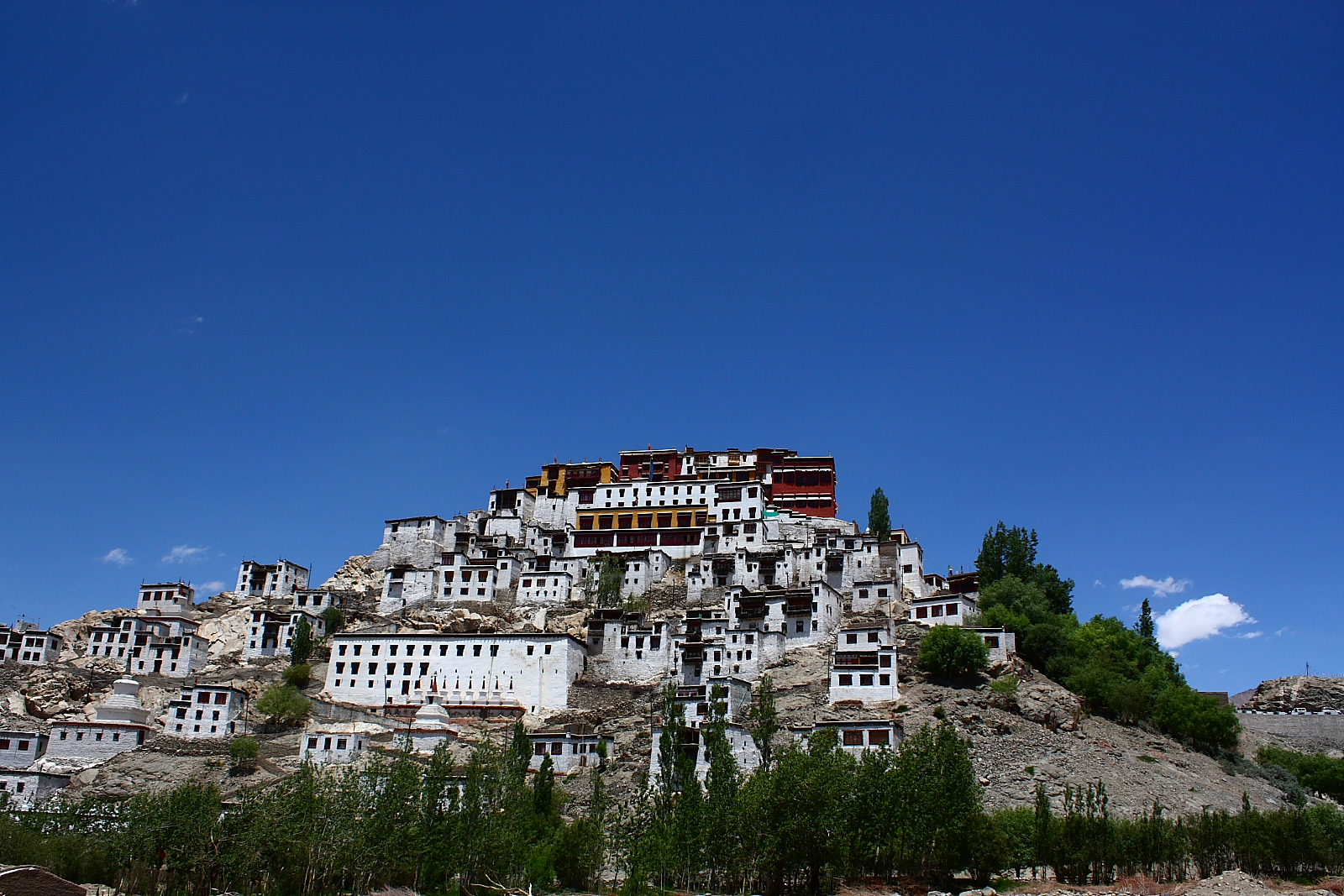
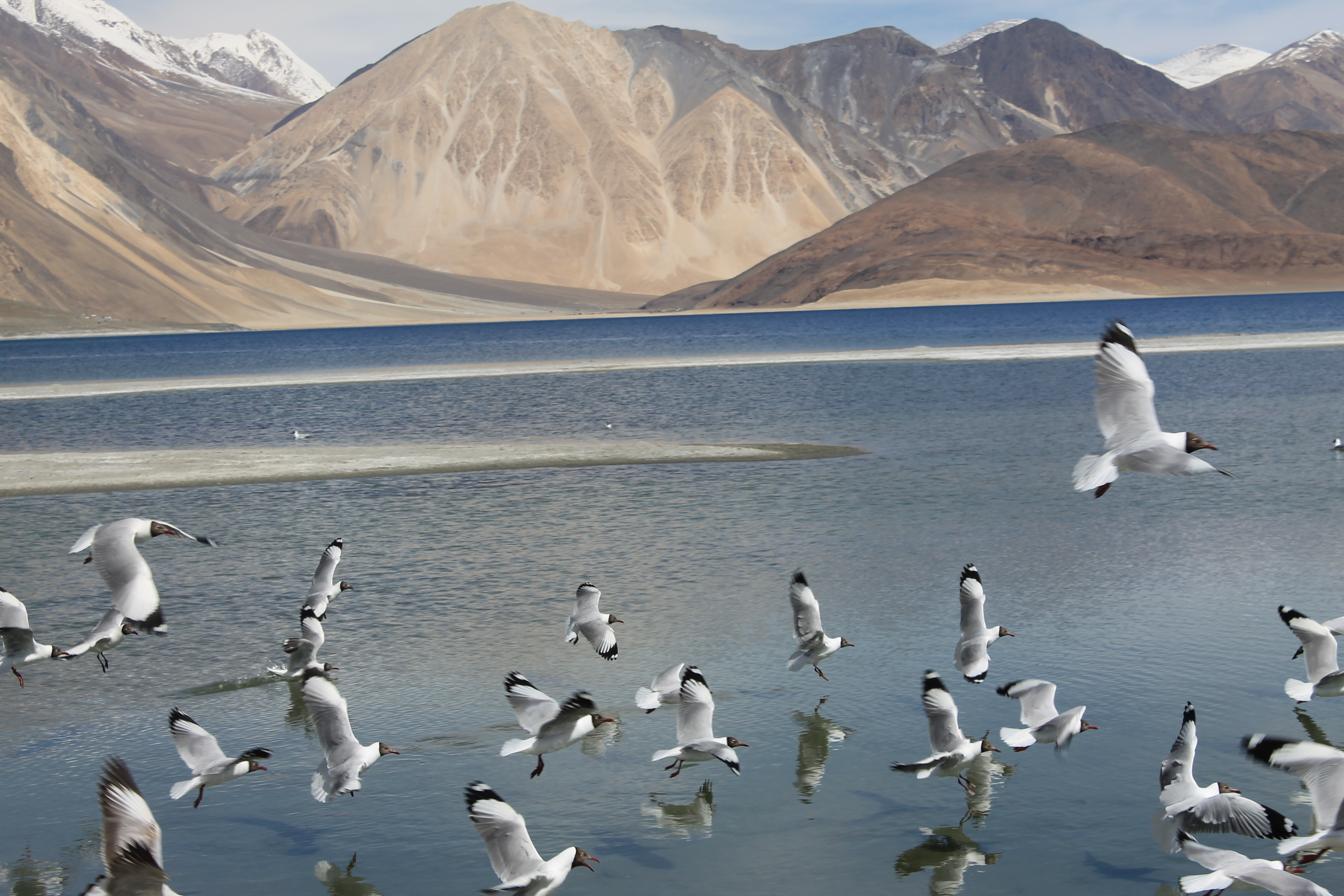
- Zanskar Range Shanti Stupa Leh Palace Rangdum village Thikse Monastery Pangong Lake

- Location of Ladakh administrated by India

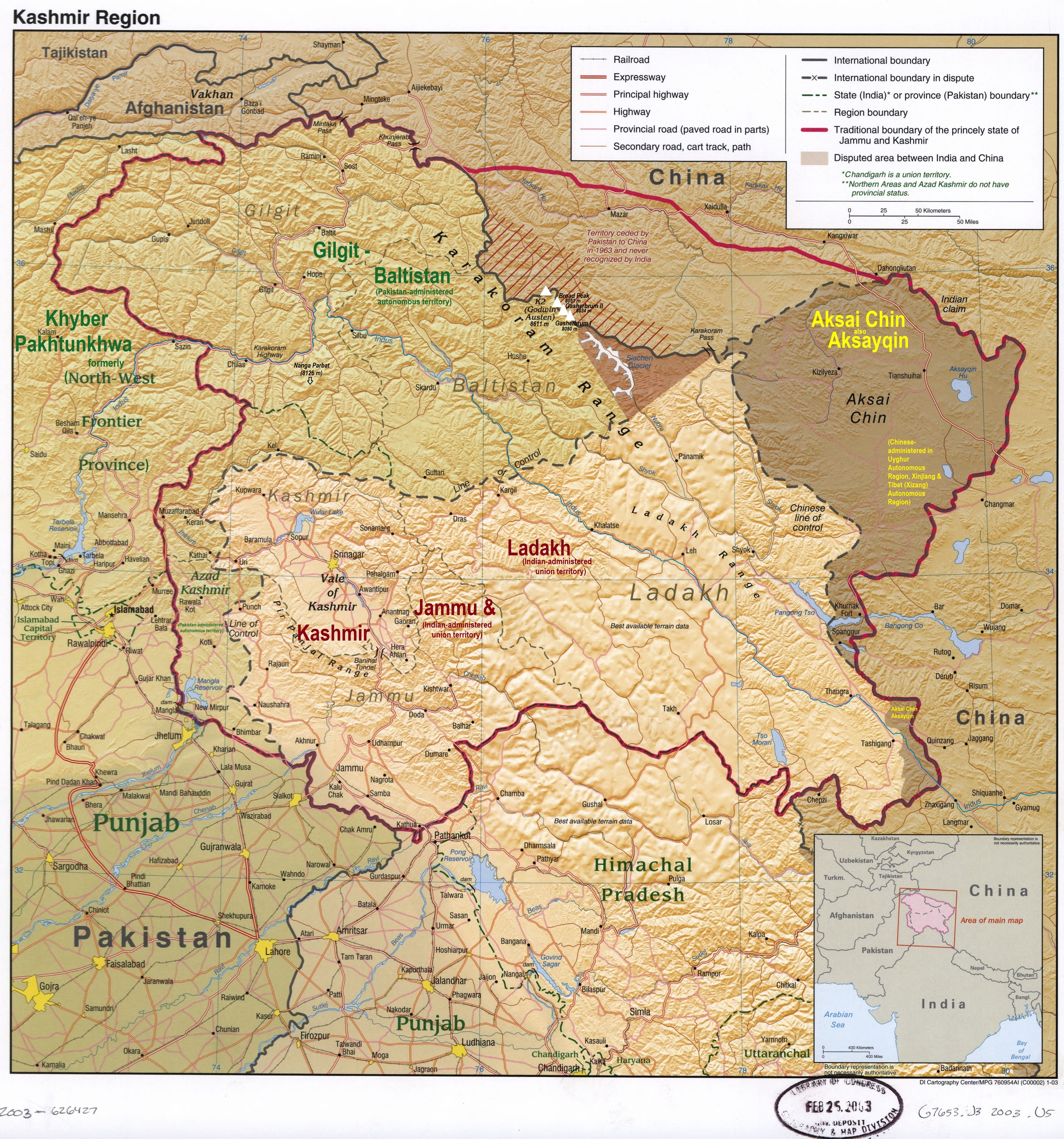
- A map of the disputed Kashmir region with the two Indian-administered areas shaded in tan
- Interactive map of Ladakh
- Coordinates: 34°09′51″N 77°35′05″E
- Administering state: India
- Union territory: 31 October 2019
- Capitals: Leh; Kargil
- Districts: 8

Government
  - Body: Administration of Ladakh
  - Lieutenant Governor: Vinai Kumar Saxena
  - Member of Parliament: Mohmad Haneefa (Independent)
  - High Court: High Court of Jammu & Kashmir and Ladakh
  - Autonomous Hill Development Councils: Ladakh Autonomous Hill Development Council

Area (Note: Ladakh is a disputed territory between India, Pakistan and China. Ladakh has 59,146 km^{2} (22,836 sq mi) of area controlled by India and 72,971 km^{2} (28,174 sq mi) of area controlled by Pakistan under Gilgit-Baltistan, which is claimed by India as part of Ladakh. Additionally, it has 5,180 km^{2} (2,000 sq mi) of area controlled by China under Trans-Karakoram Tract and 37,555 km^{2} (14,500 sq mi) of area controlled by China under Aksai Chin, both of which are claimed by India as part of Ladakh.)
  - Total: 59,146 km^{2} (22,836 sq mi)
- Highest elevation (Saltoro Kangri): 7,742 m (25,400 ft)
- Lowest elevation (Indus River): 2,550 m (8,370 ft)

Population (2011)
  - Total: 274,289
  - Density: 4.6375/km^{2} (12.011/sq mi)
- Demonym: Ladakhi

Languages
  - Official: Ladakhi; Purgi; Urdu; Hindi; English
  - Regional: Tibetan; Zangskari; Changthang; Balti; Shina; Brokskat
- Time zone: UTC+05:30 (IST)
- Postal codes: Leh: 194101; Kargil: 194103
- ISO 3166 code: IN-LA
- Vehicle registration: LA
- Literacy (2024): 81.0% (27th)
- Website: ladakh.gov.in

Ladakh (English: /ləˈdɑːk/, Hindustani [ləd̪ːaːx]) is a region administered by India as a union territory and constitutes an eastern portion of the larger Kashmir region that has been the subject of a dispute between India and Pakistan since 1947 and India and China since 1959. Ladakh is bordered by the Tibet Autonomous Region of China to the east, the Indian state of Himachal Pradesh to the south, both the Indian-administered union territory of Jammu and Kashmir and the Pakistani-administered Gilgit-Baltistan to the west, and the southwest corner of Xinjiang across the Karakoram Pass in the far north. It extends from the Siachen Glacier in the Karakoram range to the north to the main Great Himalayas to the south. The eastern end, consisting of the uninhabited Aksai Chin plains, is claimed by the Indian Government as part of Ladakh, but has been under Chinese control since 1962.

In the past, Ladakh gained importance from its strategic location at the crossroads of important trade routes, but as Chinese authorities closed the borders between Tibet Autonomous Region and Ladakh in the 1960s, international trade dwindled. Since 1974, the Government of India has encouraged tourism in Ladakh. Ladakh was established as a union territory of India on 31 October 2019, following the passage of the Jammu and Kashmir Reorganisation Act. Prior to that, it was part of the Jammu and Kashmir state.

The largest city in Ladakh is Leh, followed by Kargil; as of 2026, the territory consists of eight notified districts. Main river valleys include the Indus, Shyok, Nubra, Suru, Dras and Zanskar. The main populated regions are these river valleys, but the mountain slopes also support pastoral Changpa nomads. The main religious groups in the region are Muslims (46%, mainly Shia), Buddhists (40%, mainly Tibetan Buddhists), and Hindus (12%) with the remaining 2% made up of other religions. Ladakh is the largest and the second least populous union territory administered by India. Its culture and history are closely related to those of Tibet. As Ladakh is strategically important, the Indian military maintains a strong presence in the region.

== Name and etymology ==
The classical name in Tibetan: ལ་དྭགས, Wylie: La dwags, THL: la dak means the "land of high passes". Ladak is its pronunciation in several Tibetan dialects. The English spelling Ladakh is derived from Persian: ladāx.

Originally, Ladakh was an umbrella term for the kingdoms of Maryul and Baltiyul. Today, it commonly refers only to Maryul, which is administered by India, while the term Baltistan is now used for Baltiyul, which is administered by Pakistan.

Medieval Islamic scholars called Ladakh the "Great Tibet" (derived from Turko-Arabic Ti-bat, meaning "highland"); Baltistan and other trans-Himalayan states in Kashmir's vicinity were referred to as "Little Tibets". (Note: The extension of the term "Tibet" to the modern day Tibet is due to the Europeans in India in the 18th century.)

The 7th-century Buddhist traveller Xuanzang describes the region in his accounts as Mo-lo-so, which has been reconstructed by academics as *Malasa, *Marāsa, or *Mrāsa, which is believed to have been the original name of the region.

It has also been called Lal Bhumi (Red Earth). Names in the local language include Kanchapa (Land of snow) and Ripul (Country of mountains).

== History ==
=== Ancient history ===
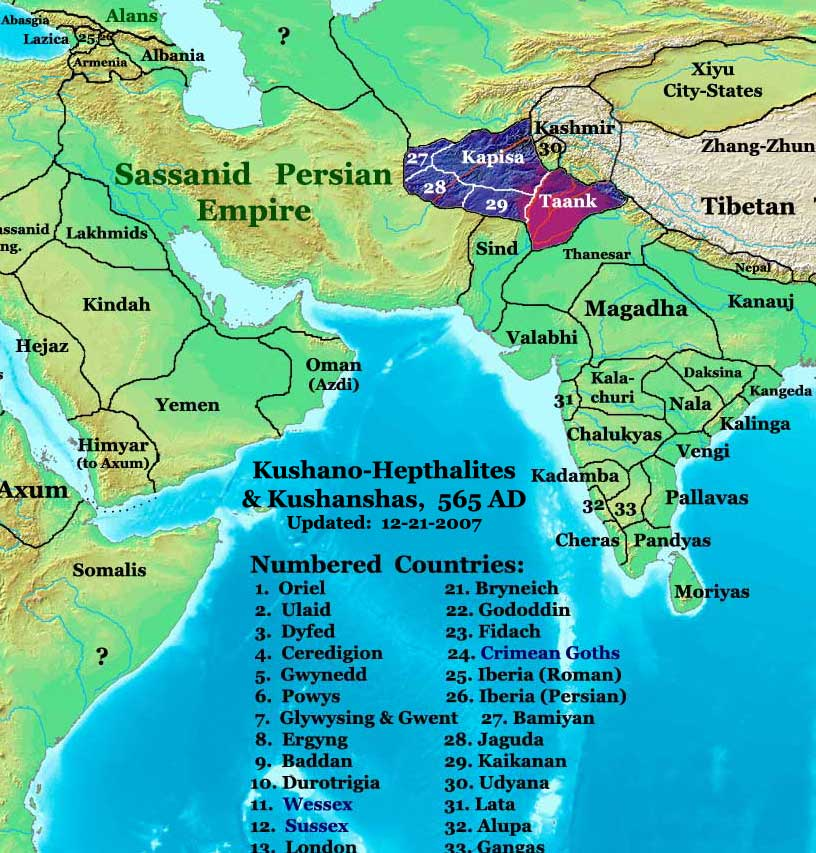
South Asia in c. 565 CE

Rock carvings found in many parts of Ladakh indicate that the area has been inhabited from Neolithic times. Ladakh's earliest inhabitants were nomads known as Kampa. Later settlements were established by Mons from Kullu and Brokpas who originated from Gilgit. Around the 1st century, Ladakh was a part of the Kushan Empire. Buddhism spread into western Ladakh from Kashmir in the 2nd century.

For much of the first millennium, western Tibet comprised Zhangzhung kingdom(s), which practised the Bon religion. Sandwiched between Kashmir and Zhangzhung, Ladakh is believed to have been alternatively under the control of one or other of these powers. Academics find strong influences of Zhangzhung language and culture in "upper Ladakh" (from the middle section of the Indus valley to the southeast). The penultimate king of Zhangzhung is said to have been from Ladakh.

From around 660 CE, the Tang dynasty and the Tibetan Empire started contesting the "four garrisons" of the Tarim Basin (present day Xinjiang), a struggle that lasted three centuries. Zhangzhung fell victim to Tibet's ambitions in c. 634 and disappeared. Karkota Empire and the Umayyad Caliphate too joined the contest for Xinjiang soon afterwards. Baltistan and Ladakh were at the centre of these struggles. Academics infer from the slant of Ladakh Chronicles that Ladakh may have owed its primary allegiance to Tibet during this time, but that it was more political than cultural. Ladakh remained Buddhist and its culture was not yet Tibetan.

=== Early medieval history ===
In the 9th century, Tibet's ruler Langdarma was assassinated and Tibet fragmented. Kyide Nyimagon, Langdarma's great-grandson, fled to West Tibet c. 900 CE, and founded a new West Tibetan kingdom at the heart of the old Zhangzhung, now called Ngari in the Tibetan language.

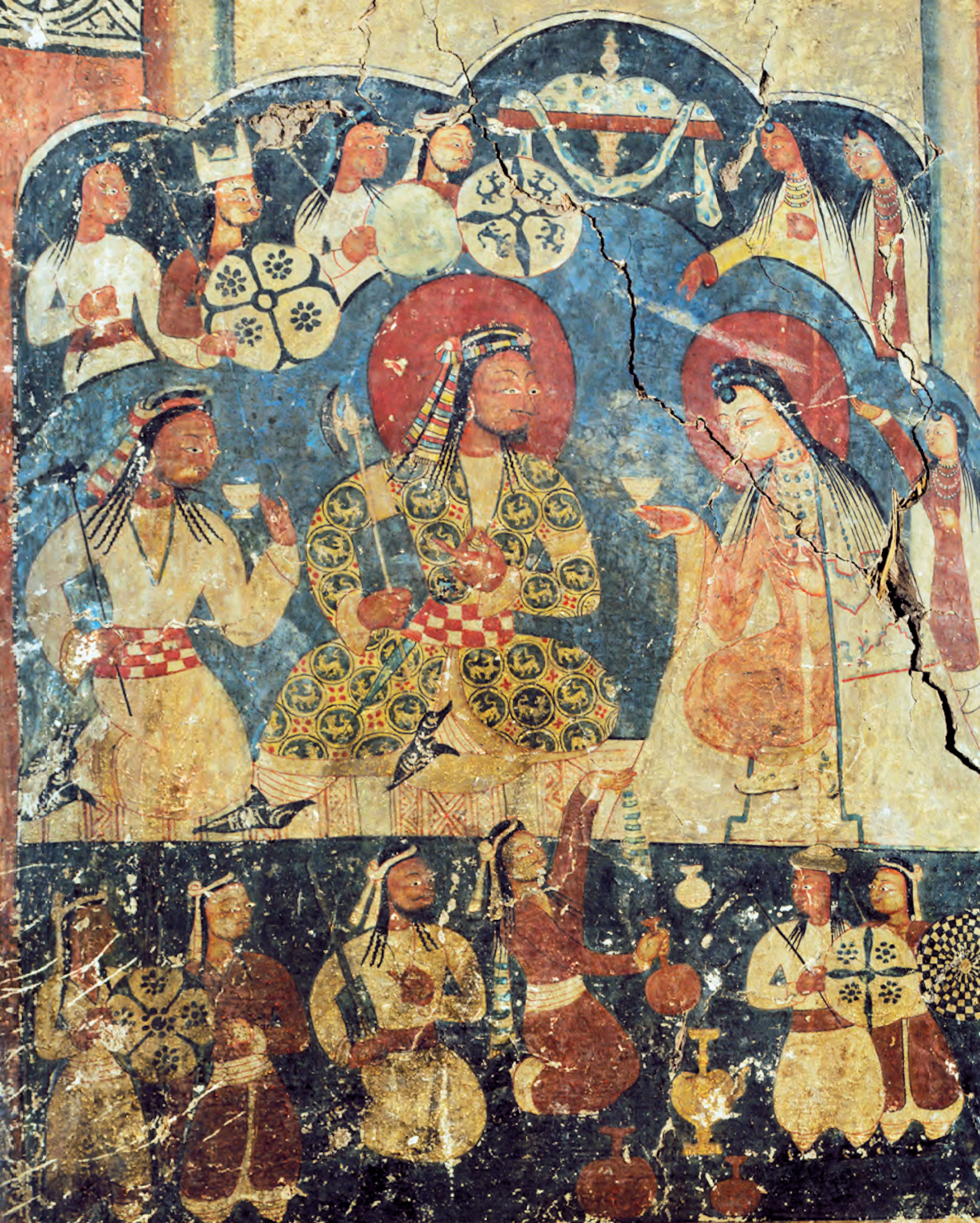
Royal drinking scene at Alchi Monastery, Ladakh, c. 1200 CE. The king wears a decorated Qabā', of Turco-Persian style. It is similar to another royal scene at nearby Mangyu Monastery

Nyimagon's eldest son, Lhachen Palgyigon, is believed to have conquered the regions to the north, including Ladakh and Rutog. After the death of Nyimagon, his kingdom was divided among his three sons, Palgyigon receiving Ladakh, Rutog, Thok Jalung and an area referred to as Demchok Karpo (a holy mountain near the present-day Demchok village). The second son received Guge–Purang (called "Ngari Korsum") and the third son received Zanskar and Spiti (to the southwest of Ladakh). This three-way division of Nyimagon's empire was recognised as historic and remembered in the chronicles of all the three regions as a founding narrative:

He gave to each of his sons a separate kingdom, viz., to the eldest Dpal-gyi-gon, Maryul of Mngah-ris, the inhabitants using black bows; ru-thogs [Rutog] of the east and the Gold-mine of Hgog [possibly Thok Jalung]; nearer this way Lde-mchog-dkar-po [Demchok Karpo]; ...

The first West Tibetan dynasty of Maryul founded by Palgyigon lasted five centuries, being weakened towards its end by the conquests of the Mongol/Mughal noble Mirza Haidar Dughlat. Throughout this period the region was called "Maryul", possibly from the original proper name *Mrasa (Xuangzhang's, Mo-lo-so), but in the Tibetan language it was interpreted to mean "lowland" (the lowland of Ngari). Maryul remained staunchly Buddhist during this period, having participated in the second diffusion of Buddhism from India to Tibet via Kashmir and Zanskar.

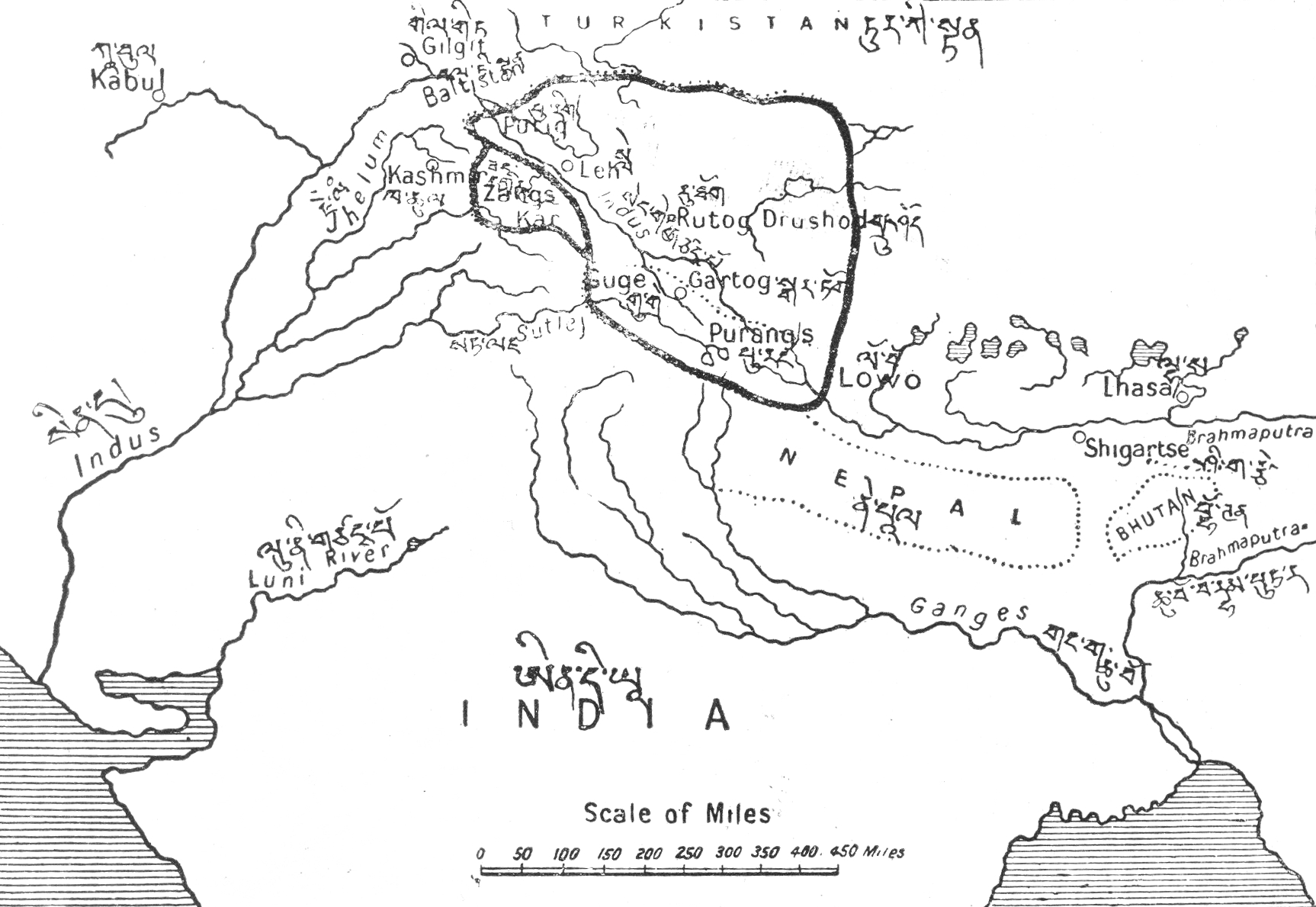
The empire of Kyide Nyimagon divided among his three sons, c. 930 CE. The border between Ladakh/Maryul and Guge-Purang is shown in a thin dotted line, north of Gartok

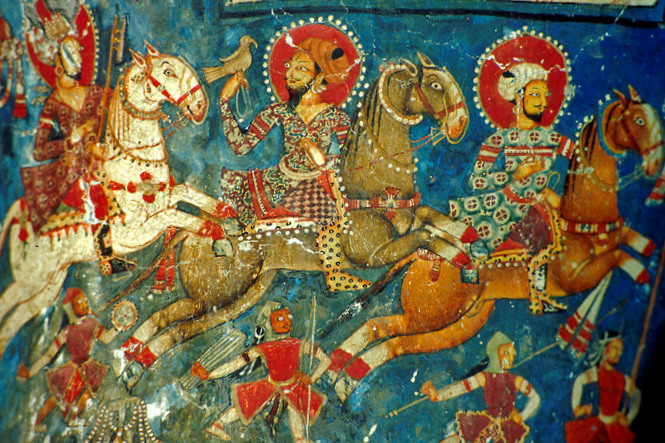
Ladakhi horsemen, depicted in Alchi Monastery, c. 11th century CE

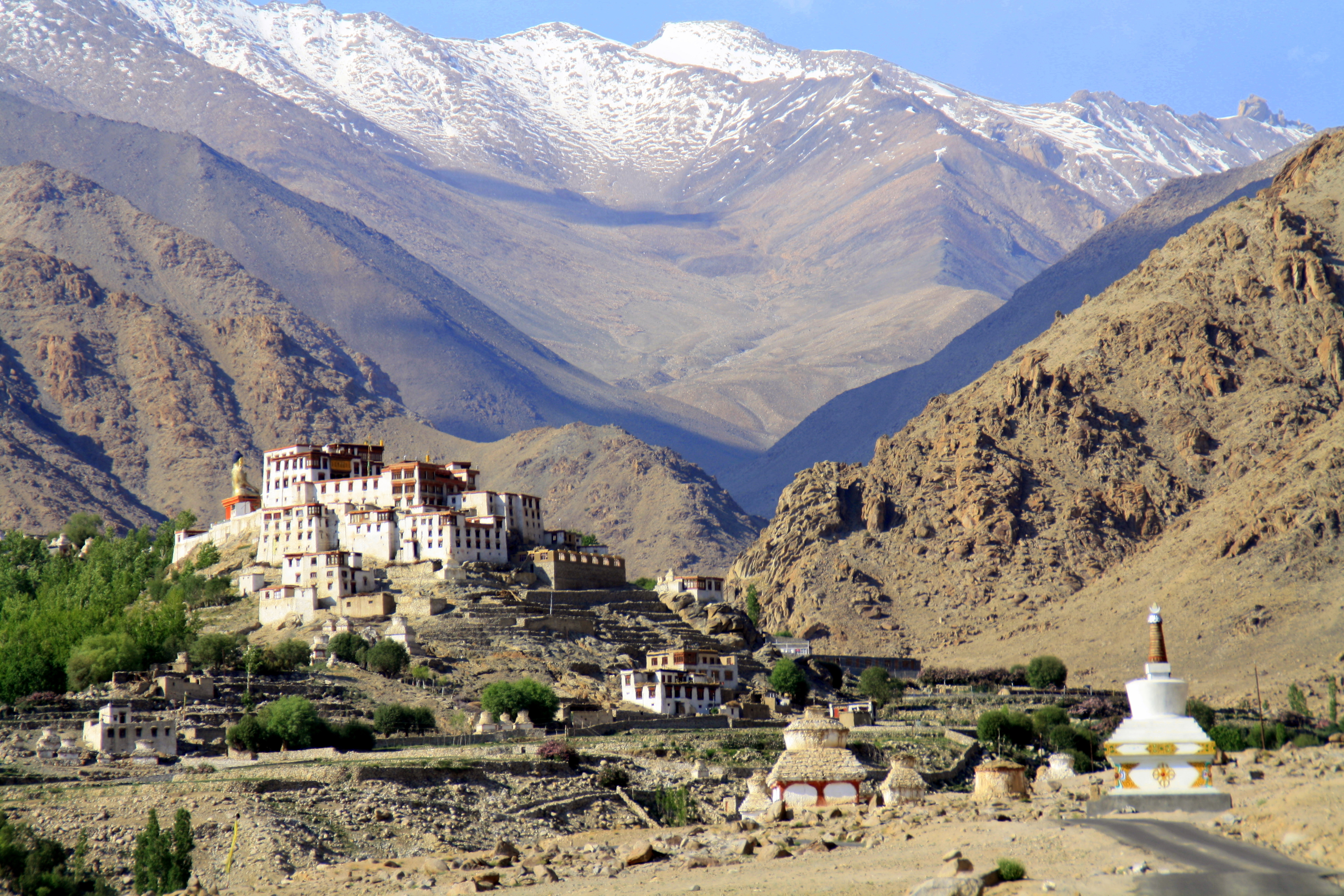
Likir Monastery, Likir, first built in c. 11th century CE

=== Medieval history ===
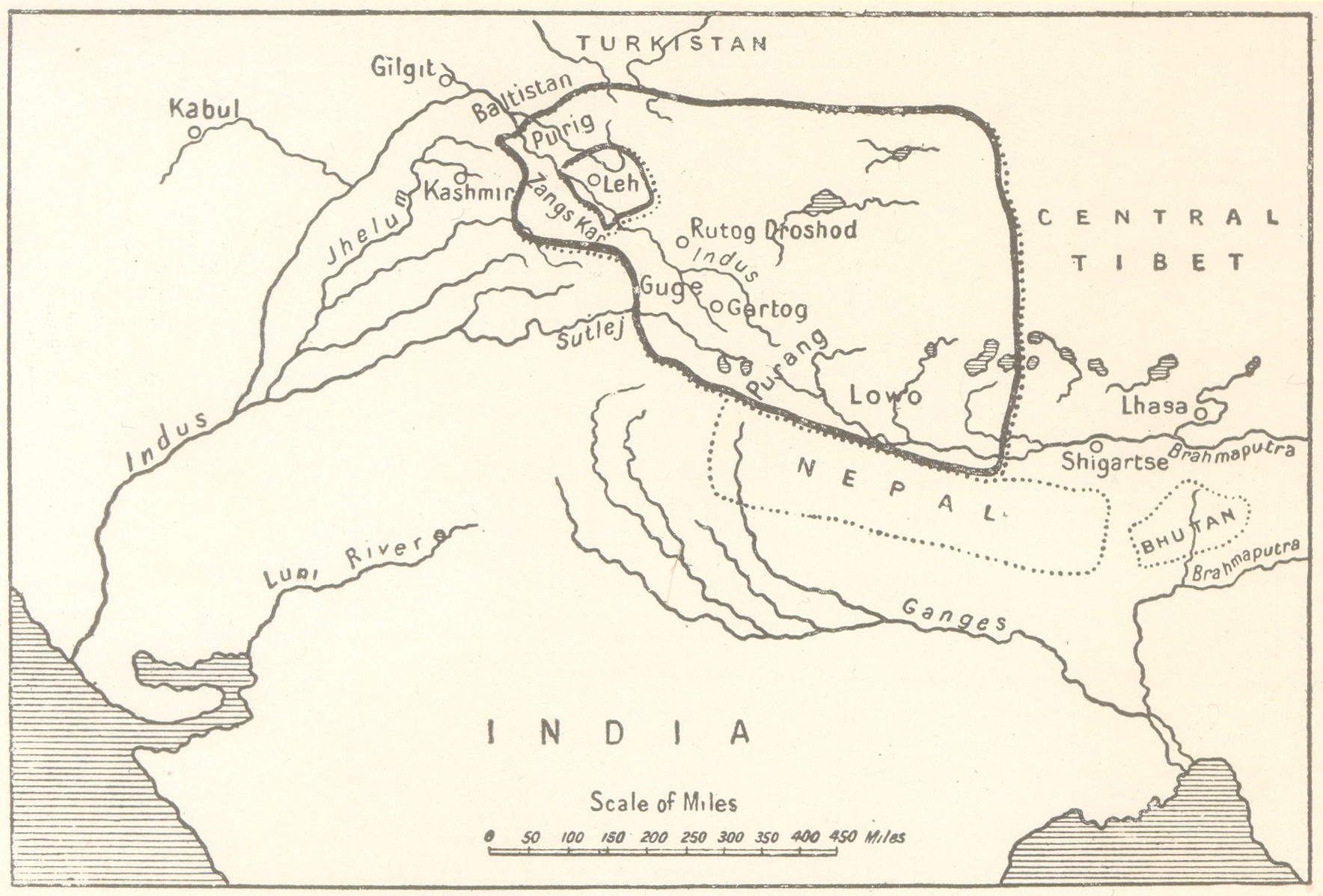
Ladakh at its largest extent c. 1560–1600 CE

King Bhagan united and strengthened Ladakh in 1460 by overthrowing the king of Leh, and founded the Namgyal dynasty (Namgyal means "victorious" in several Tibetan languages). The Namgyals repelled most Central Asian raiders and temporarily extended the kingdom as far as Nepal.

Between the 1380s and early 1510s, many Sufi missionaries propagated Islam and proselytised the Ladakhi people. Mir Sayyid Ali Hamadani was the first one to make Muslim converts in Ladakh and is often described as the founder of Islam in Ladakh. His principal disciple, Mir Muhammad Nurbakhsh Qahistani followed in his footsetps and also propagated Islam to Ladakhis and the Balti people, who rapidly converted to Islam. Noorbakshia Islam is named after him and his followers are only found in Baltistan and Ladakh. In 1505, Mir Shams-ud-Din Araqi, a prominent Shia scholar, visited Kashmir and Baltistan. He helped in the spread of Shia Islam in Kashmir and converted the majority of Muslims in Baltistan to his school of thought. Several mosques were built in Ladakh during this period, including in Mulbhe, Padum and Shey, then the capital of Ladakh. The Kashmiri Sufi saint, Zain ud-Din Wali, also proselytised in Ladakh upon his expulsion by Zayn al-Abidin the Great from Kashmir.

It is unclear what happened to Islam after this period and it seems to have received a setback. Mirza Muhammad Haidar Dughlat, who invaded and briefly conquered Ladakh in 1532, 1545, and 1548, did not record any presence of Islam in Leh during his invasion. However, Shia Islam and Noorbakshia Islam continued to flourish in other regions of Ladakh.

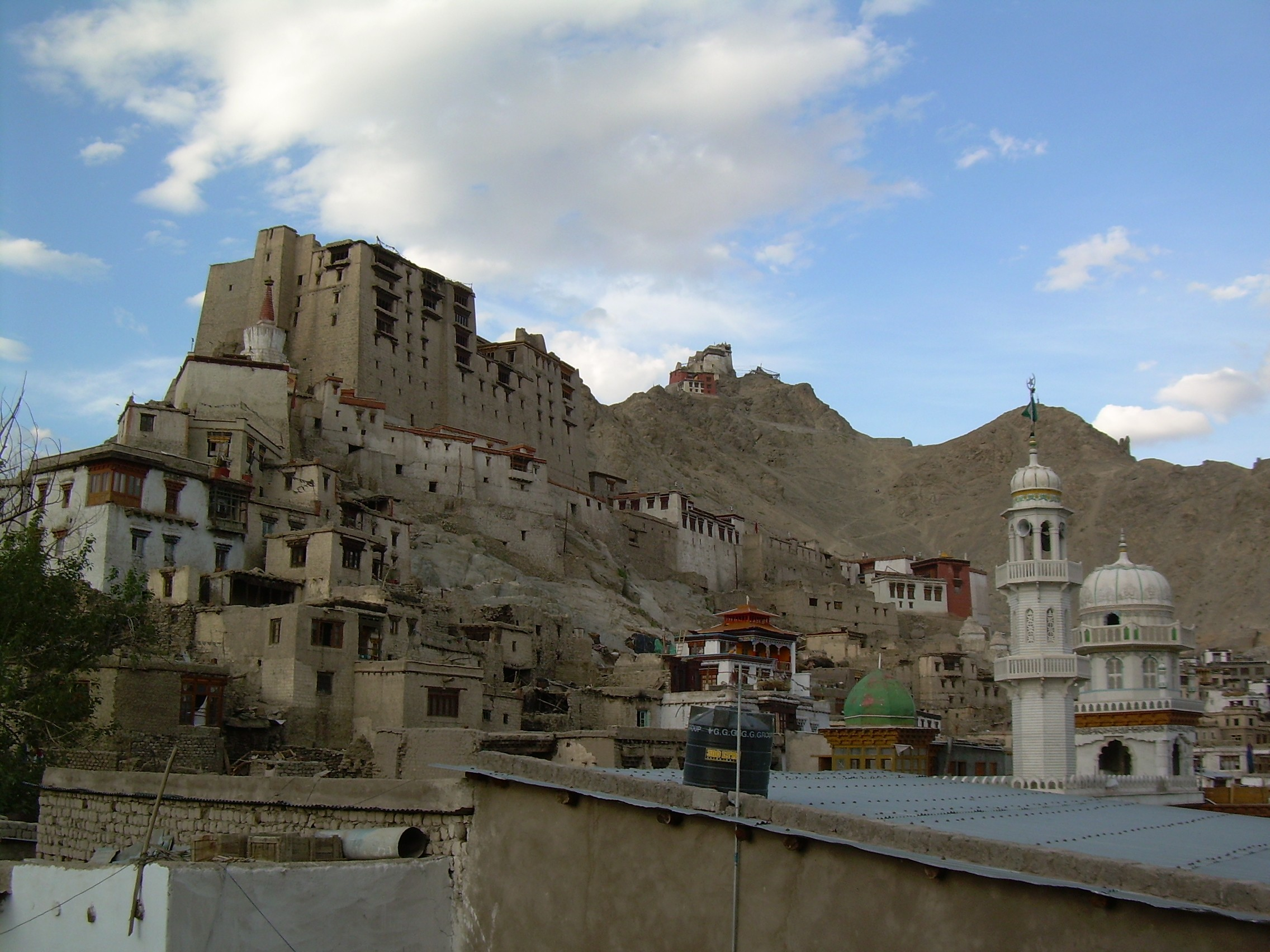
Jama Masjid of Leh next to the Leh Palace

During the Balti invasion in late 16th century, led by Raja of Skardu, Ali Sher Khan Anchan, many Buddhist temples and artefacts were damaged and destroyed. Anchan took the king Jamyang Namgyal and his soldiers as captives to Skardu. Namgyal was later restored to the throne by Anchan and given the hand of a Balti princess in marriage, named Gyal Khatun or Argyal Khatun. Historical accounts differ upon who her father was. Some identify Anchan's ally and Raja of Khaplu, Yabgo Shey Gilazi as her father, while others identify Anchan himself as the father. In return, the daughter of Namgyal, Mandok Gyalmo was married to Anchan. Islam began to take root in the Leh area in the beginning of the 17th century after the Balti invasion and the marriage of Gyal to Jamyang. A large group of Muslim servants and musicians were sent along with Gyal to Ladakh and private mosques were built where they could pray. The Muslim musicians later settled in Leh. Several hundred Baltis migrated to the kingdom and according to oral tradition, many Muslim traders were granted land to settle, while many others were invited over the following years for various purposes.

In the early 17th century, efforts were made to restore the destroyed artefacts and gompas by Sengge Namgyal, Jamyang's son and successor. He also ordered the building of Hemis Monastery, Henle Gompa as well as Leh Palace. During his reign, he expanded the kingdom into Zanskar and Spiti.

In the late 17th century, Ladakh sided with Bhutan in its dispute with Tibet which, among other reasons, resulted in its invasion by the Tibetan Central Government. This event is known as the Tibet–Ladakh–Mughal war of 1679–1684. The war resulted in the Treaty of Tingmosgang, whereby Tibet recognised the independence of Ladakh and Ladakh was reduced to its present day borders. Kashmiri historians assert that the king converted to Islam in return for the assistance by the Mughal Empire after this, however, Ladakh chronicles do not make any such mention. The king agreed to pay tribute to the Mughals in return for defending the kingdom. The Mughals, however, withdrew after being paid off by the 5th Dalai Lama.

=== Princely state of Jammu and Kashmir ===
The disputed territory of the princely state of Jammu and Kashmir: divided between Pakistan (green), India (blue) and China (yellow)

In 1834, the Sikh Zorawar Singh, a general of Raja Gulab Singh of Jammu, invaded and annexed Ladakh to Jammu under the suzerainty of the Sikh Empire. After the defeat of the Sikhs in the First Anglo-Sikh War, the state of Jammu and Kashmir was established as a separate princely state under British suzerainty. The Namgyal family was given the jagir of Stok, which it nominally retains to this day. European influence began in Ladakh in the 1850s and increased. Geologists, sportsmen, and tourists began exploring Ladakh. In 1885, Leh became the headquarters of a mission of the Moravian Church.

Ladakh was administered as a wazarat under Dogra rule, with a governor termed wazir-e-wazarat. It had three tehsils, based at Leh, Skardu and Kargil. The headquarters of the wazarat was at Leh for six months of the year and at Skardu for six months. When the legislative assembly, called Praja Sabha, was established in 1934, Ladakh was given two nominated seats in the assembly.

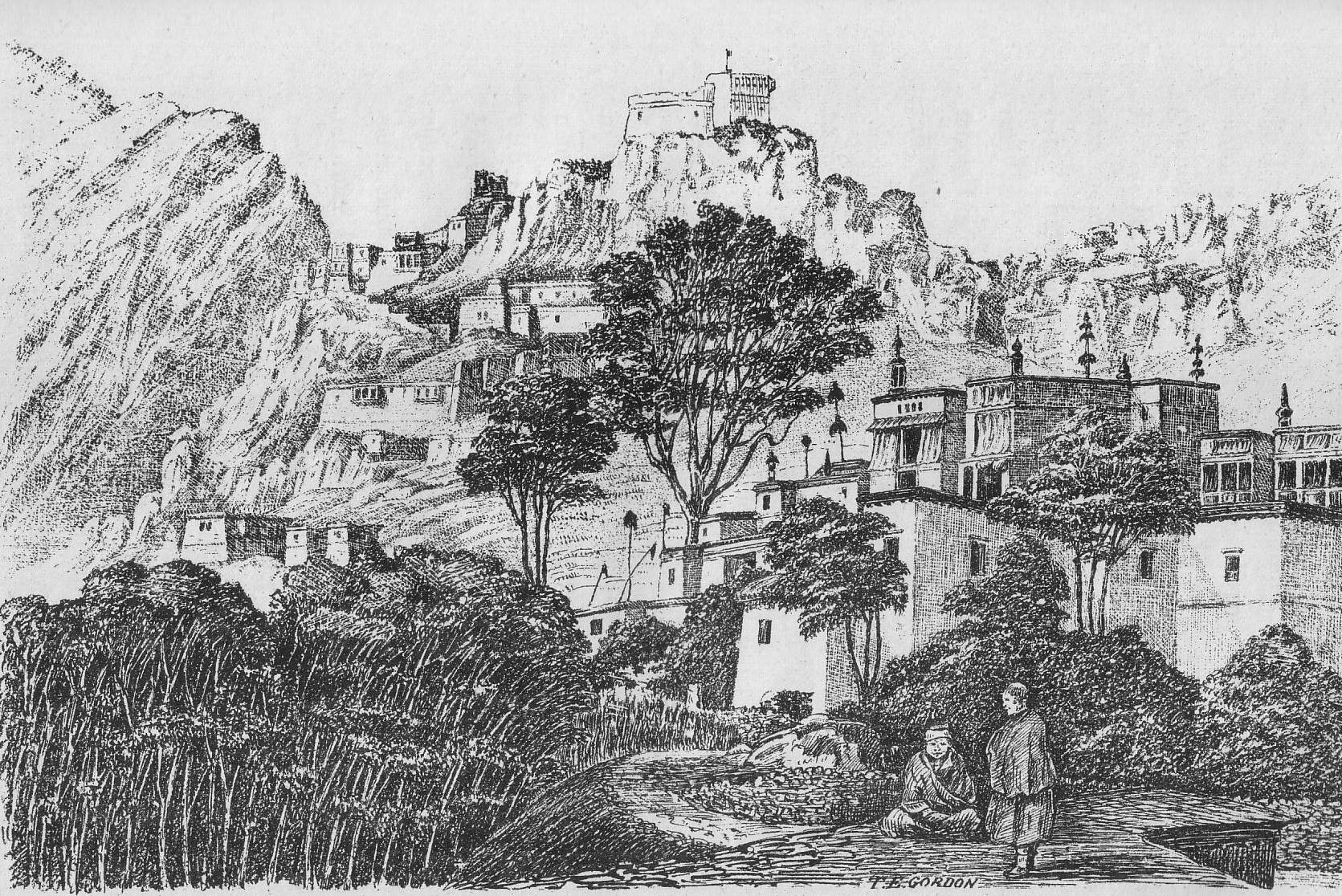
Hemis Monastery in the 1870s

Ladakh was claimed as part of Tibet by Phuntsok Wangyal, a Tibetan Communist leader.

=== Indian state of Jammu and Kashmir ===
At the time of the partition of India in 1947, the Dogra ruler Maharaja Hari Singh chose to remain independent of India or Pakistan. Following the Poonch Rebellion in the western districts of the princely state, the maharaja sought defence assistance from India, but was told by Nehru to sign the Instrument of Accession to India, and military operations were initiated to counter the invasion. Hearing the news of accession, the Gilgit Scouts stationed at Gilgit rebelled and reached into Ladakh by November. The wartime conversion of the pony trail from Sonamarg to Zoji La by army engineers permitted tanks to move up and successfully capture the pass. The advance continued. Dras, Kargil and Leh were taken and Ladakh cleared of the Pakistanis.

In 1949, China closed the border between Nubra and Xinjiang, blocking old trade routes. In 1955 China began to build roads connecting Xinjiang and Tibet through the Aksai Chin area. The Indian effort to gain control of Aksai Chin led to the Sino-Indian War of 1962, which India lost. China also built the Karakoram highway jointly with Pakistan. India built the Srinagar-Leh Highway during this period, cutting the journey time between Srinagar and Leh from 16 days to two. The route, however, remains closed during the winter months due to heavy snowfall. To make the route functional throughout the year, a 6.5 km (4.0 mi) tunnel across Zoji La pass, the Zoji-la Tunnel, is under construction.

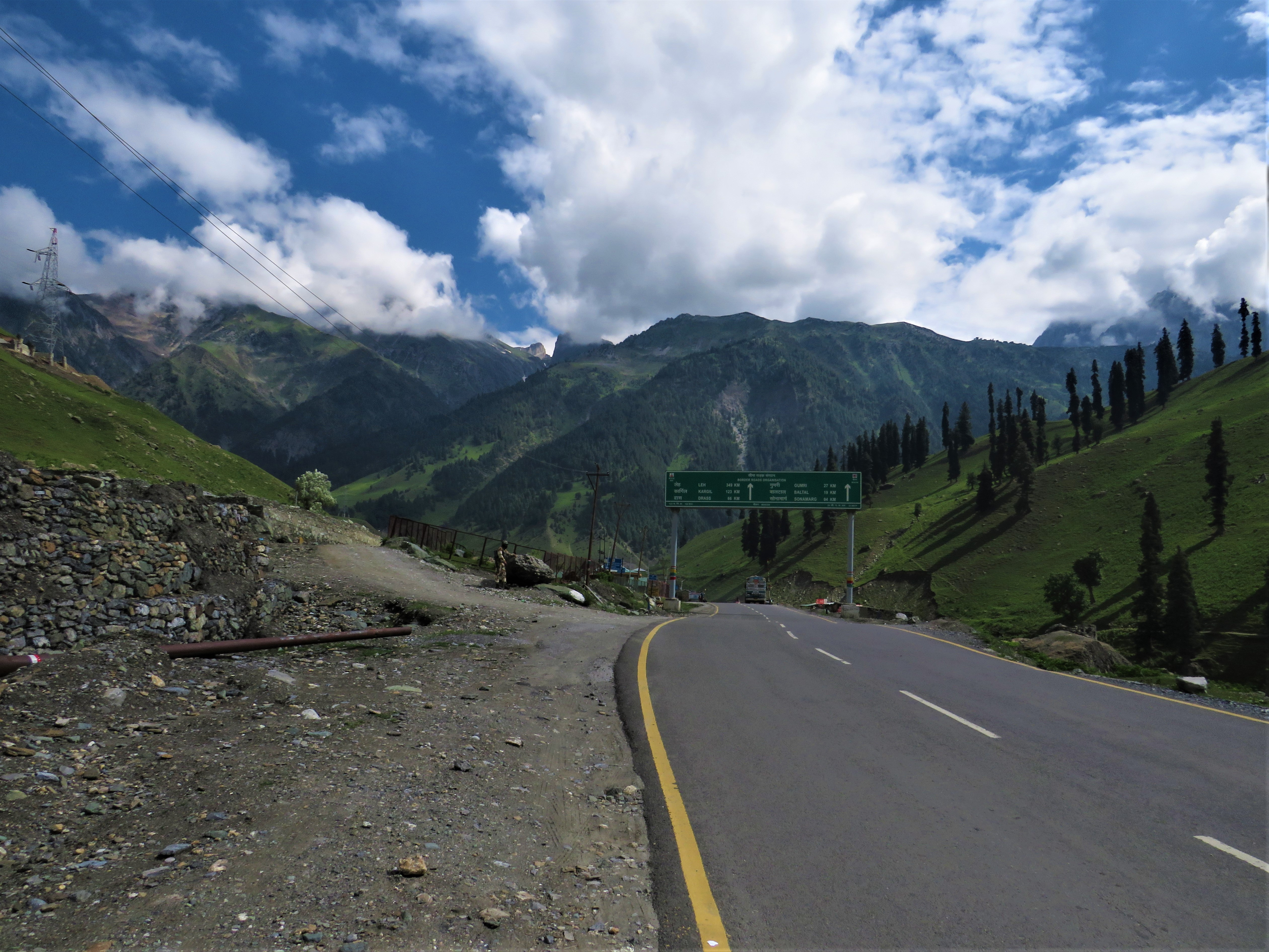
National Highway 1 which runs between Jammu & Kashmir and Ladakh

The Kargil War of 1999, codenamed "Operation Vijay" by the Indian Army, saw infiltration by Pakistani troops into parts of Western Ladakh, namely Kargil, Dras, Mushkoh, Batalik and Chorbatla, overlooking key locations on the Srinagar-Leh highway. Extensive operations were launched in high altitudes by the Indian Army with considerable artillery and air force support. Pakistani troops were evicted from the Indian side of the Line of Control which the Indian government ordered was to be respected and which was not crossed by Indian troops. The Indian government was criticised by the Indian public because India respected geographical co-ordinates more than India's opponents: Pakistan and China.

The Ladakh region was divided into the Kargil and Leh districts in 1979. In 1989, there were violent riots between Buddhists and Muslims. Following demands for autonomy from the Kashmiri-dominated state government, the Ladakh Autonomous Hill Development Council was created in the 1990s. Leh and Kargil districts now each have their own locally elected Hill Councils with some control over local policy and development funds. In 1991, a Peace Pagoda was erected in Leh by Nipponzan Myohoji.

There was a heavy presence of Indian Army and Indo-Tibetan Border Police forces in Ladakh. These forces and People's Liberation Army forces from China have, since the 1962 Sino-Indian War, had frequent stand-offs along the Ladakh portion of the Line of Actual Control. Out of the 857-kilometre-long (533 mi) border in Ladakh, only 368 km (229 mi) is the International Border, and the remaining 489 km (304 mi) is the Line of Actual Control. The stand-off involving the most troops was in September 2014 in the disputed Chumar region when 800 to 1,000 Indian troops and 1,500 Chinese troops came into close proximity to each other.

==== Ladakh Division ====
On 8 February 2019, Ladakh became a separate Revenue and Administrative Division within Jammu and Kashmir, having previously been part of the Kashmir Division. As a division, Ladakh was granted its own Divisional Commissioner and Inspector General of Police.

Leh was initially chosen to be the headquarters of the new division however, following protests, it was announced that Leh and Kargil will jointly serve as the divisional headquarters, each hosting an Additional Divisional Commissioner to assist the Divisional Commissioner and Inspector General of Police who will spend half their time in each town.

=== Union territory of Ladakh ===
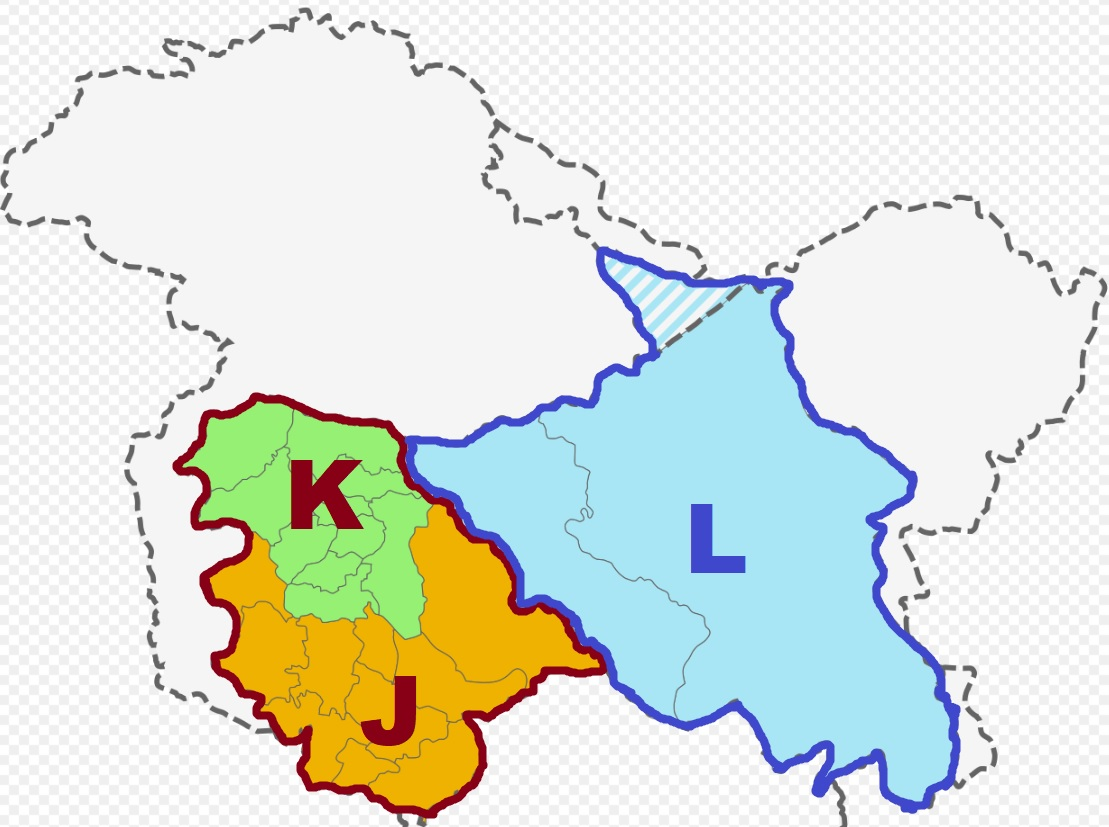
Ladakh (L) shown in the wider Kashmir region

The people of Ladakh had been demanding Ladakh to be constituted as a separate territory since 1930s, because of perceived unfair treatment by Kashmir and Ladakh's cultural differences with predominantly Muslim Kashmir valley, while some people in Kargil opposed union territory status for Ladakh. The first organised agitation was launched against Kashmir's "dominance" in the year 1964. In late 1980s, a much larger mass agitation was launched to press their demand for union territory status.

In August 2019, a reorganisation act was passed by the Parliament of India which contained provisions to reconstitute Ladakh as a union territory, separate from the rest of Jammu and Kashmir on 31 October 2019. Under the terms of the act, the union territory is administered by a Lieutenant Governor acting on behalf of the union Government of India and does not have an elected legislative assembly or chief minister. Each district within the union territory continues to elect an autonomous district council as done previously.

The demand for Ladakh as separate union territory was first raised by the parliamentarian Kushok Bakula Rinpoche around 1955, which was later carried forward by another parliamentarian Thupstan Chhewang. The former Jammu and Kashmir state use to obtain large allocation of annual funds from the union government based on the fact that the large geographical area of the Ladakh (comprising 65% of total area), but Ladakh was allocated only 2% of the state budget based on its relative population. Within the first year of the formation of Ladakh as separate union territory, its annual budget allocation has increased 4 times from ₹57 crore to ₹232 crore.

On 24 September 2025, the protest march led by Sonam Wangchuk demanded full statehood of Ladakh.

== Geography ==
Map of the central Ladakh region

Ladakh is the highest plateau in India with most of it being over 3,000 m (9,800 ft). It extends from the Himalayan to the Kunlun Ranges and includes the upper Indus River valley.

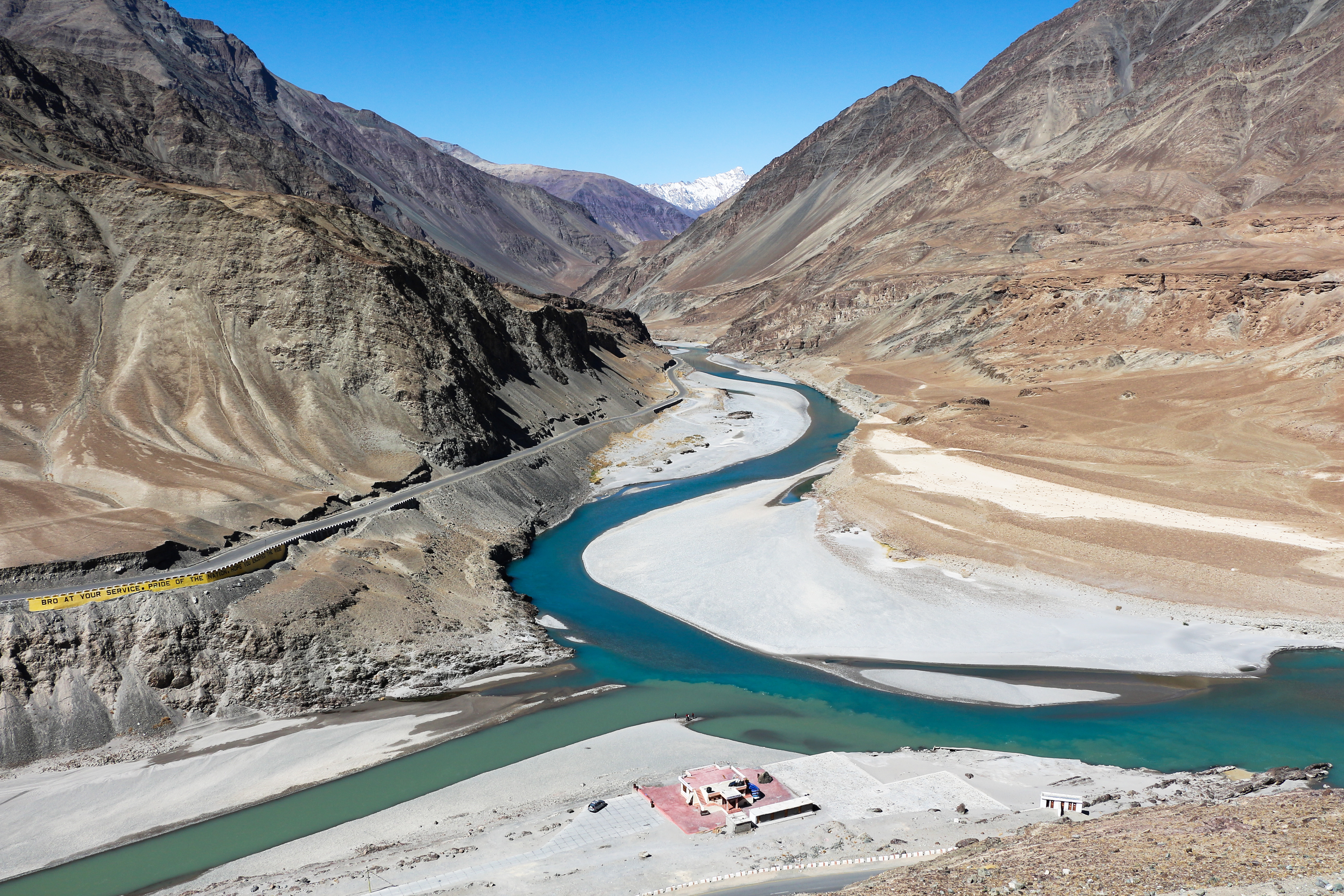
The confluence of the Indus (flowing left-to-right) and Zanskar (coming in from top) rivers.

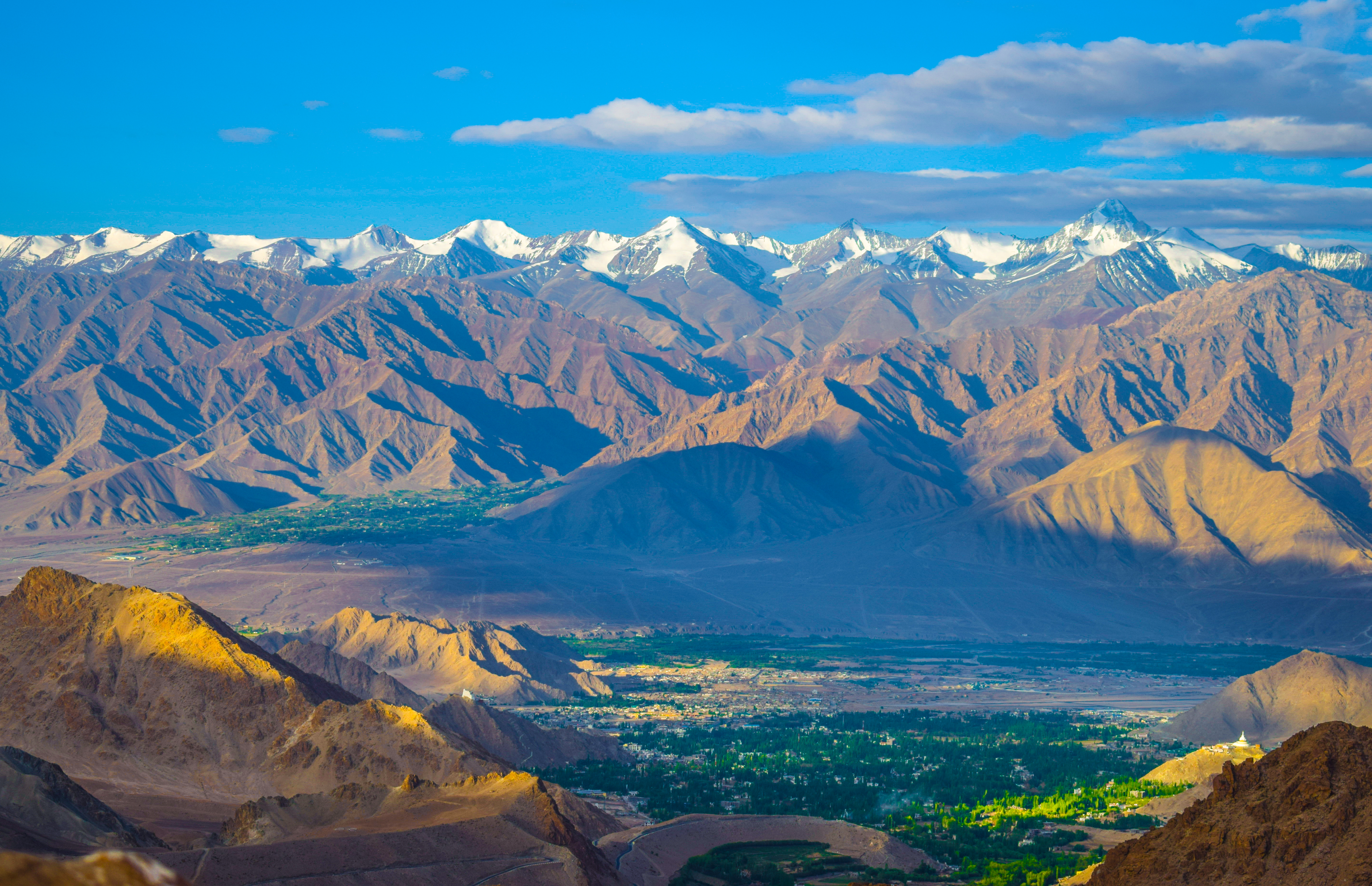
View of Leh Town along with Stok Kangri

Historically, the region included the Baltistan (Baltiyul) valleys (now mostly in Pakistani-administered Kashmir), the entire upper Indus Valley, the remote Zanskar, Lahaul and Spiti districts to the south, much of Ngari (including the Rudok region and Guge in the east), Aksai Chin in the northeast, and the Nubra Valley to the north, over Khardong La in the Ladakh Range. Contemporary Ladakh borders Tibet to the east, the Lahaul and Spiti regions to the south, the Vale of Kashmir, Jammu and Baltiyul regions to the west, and the southwest corner of Xinjiang, China across the Karakoram Pass in the far north. The historically vague divide between Ladakh and the Tibetan Plateau commences to the north in an intricate maze of ridges to the east of Rudok, including Aling Kangri and Mavang Kangri, continuing southeastward toward northwestern Nepal. Before partition, Baltistan, now part of Pakistan, had been a district of Ladakh; Skardu was the winter capital of Ladakh, with Leh being the summer capital.

The mountain ranges in this region were formed over 45 million years by the folding of the Indian Plate into the more stationary Eurasian Plate. The drift continues, causing frequent earthquakes in the Himalayan region. (Note: All of Indian Ladakh is placed in high risk Zone VIII, while areas from Kargil and Zanskar southwestward are in lower risk zones on the earthquake hazard scale.) The peaks in the Ladakh Range are at a medium altitude close to the Zoji-la (5,000–5,500 m or 16,400–18,000 ft) and increase toward southeast, culminating in the twin summits of Nun-Kun (7,000 m or 23,000 ft).

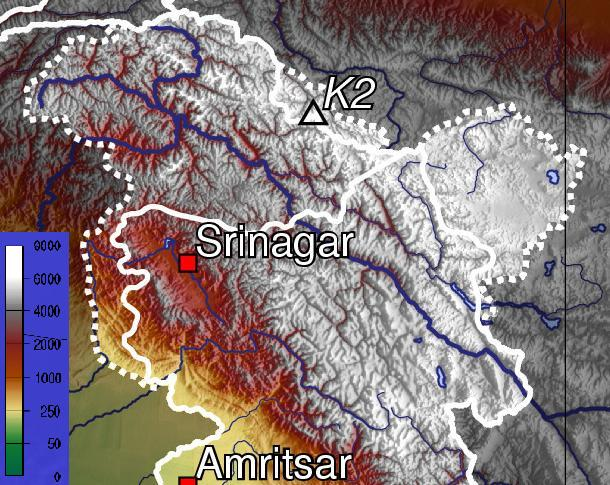
The Ladakh region has high altitude

The Suru and Zanskar Valleys form a great trough, enclosed by the Himalayas and the Zanskar Range. Rangdum is the highest inhabited region in the Suru valley, after which the valley rises to 4,400 m (14,400 ft) at Pensi-la, the gateway to Zanskar. Kargil, the only town in the Suru Valley, is the second-most important town in Ladakh. It was an important staging post on the routes of trade caravans prior to 1947, being more-or-less equidistant (at about 230 kilometres) from Srinagar, Leh, Skardu and Padum. The Zanskar Valley lies in the troughs of the rivers Stod and Lungnak. The region experiences heavy snowfall; the Pensi-la is open only between June and mid-October. Dras and the Mushkoh Valley form the western extremity of Ladakh.

The Indus River is the backbone of Ladakh. Most major historical and current towns – Shey, Leh, Basgo and Tingmosgang (but not Kargil), are close to the Indus River. After the Indo-Pakistani War of 1947, the stretch of the Indus flowing through Ladakh became the only part of this river, which is greatly venerated in the Hindu religion and culture, that still flows through India.

The Siachen Glacier is in the eastern Karakoram Range in the Himalaya Mountains along the disputed India-Pakistan border. The Karakoram Range forms a great watershed that separates China from the Indian subcontinent and is sometimes called the "Third Pole". The glacier lies between the Saltoro Ridge immediately to the west and the main Karakoram Range to the east. At 76 km (47 mi) long, it is the longest glacier in the Karakoram and second-longest in the world's non-polar areas. It falls from an altitude of 5,753 m (18,875 ft) above sea level at its source at Indira Col on the China border down to 3,620 m (11,880 ft) at its snout. Saser Kangri is the highest peak in the Saser Muztagh, the easternmost subrange of the Karakoram Range in India, Saser Kangri I having an altitude of 7,672 m (25,171 ft).

The Ladakh Range has no major peaks; its average height is a little less than 6,000 m (20,000 ft), and few of its passes are less than 5,000 m (16,000 ft). The Pangong range runs parallel to the Ladakh Range for about 100 km (62 mi) northwest from Chushul along the southern shore of the Pangong Lake. Its highest point is about 6,700 m (22,000 ft) and the northern slopes are heavily glaciated. The region comprising the valley of the Shyok and Nubra rivers is known as Nubra. The Karakoram Range in Ladakh is not as mighty as in Baltistan. The massifs to the north and east of the Nubra–Siachen line include the Apsarasas Group (highest point at 7,245 m or 23,770 ft) the Rimo Muztagh (highest point at 7,385 m or 24,229 ft) and the Teram Kangri Group (highest point at 7,464 m or 24,488 ft) together with Mamostong Kangri (7,526 m or 24,692 ft) and Singhi Kangri (7,202 m or 23,629 ft). North of the Karakoram lies the Kunlun. Thus, between Leh and eastern Central Asia there is a triple barrier – the Ladakh Range, Karakoram Range, and Kunlun. Nevertheless, a major trade route was established between Leh and Yarkand.

Monthly average temperature in Leh

Ladakh is a high-altitude desert; the Himalayas create a rain shadow which generally denies passage of any monsoon clouds. The main source of water is the winter snowfall on the mountains. Recent flooding in the region (e.g., the 2010 floods) has been attributed to abnormal rain patterns and retreating glaciers, both of which have been found to be linked to global climate change. The Leh Nutrition Project, headed by Chewang Norphel—also known as the "Glacier Man"—creates artificial glaciers as one solution for retreating glaciers.

The regions on the north flank of the Himalayas – Dras, the Suru valley and Zangskar – experience heavy snowfall and remain cut-off from the rest of the region for several months during the year, just as the entire region remains isolated by road from the rest of the country. Summers are short, though they are long enough to grow crops; summer weather is dry and pleasant. Peak temperatures range from 3 to 35 °C (37 to 95 °F) in the summer and minimums range from −20 to −35 °C (−4 to −31 °F) in winter.

The Zanskar river, along with its tributaries is the primary waterway of the region. When it freezes solid during the winter, the Chadar trek is traditionally the only means of travel to and from the area.

=== Flora and fauna ===
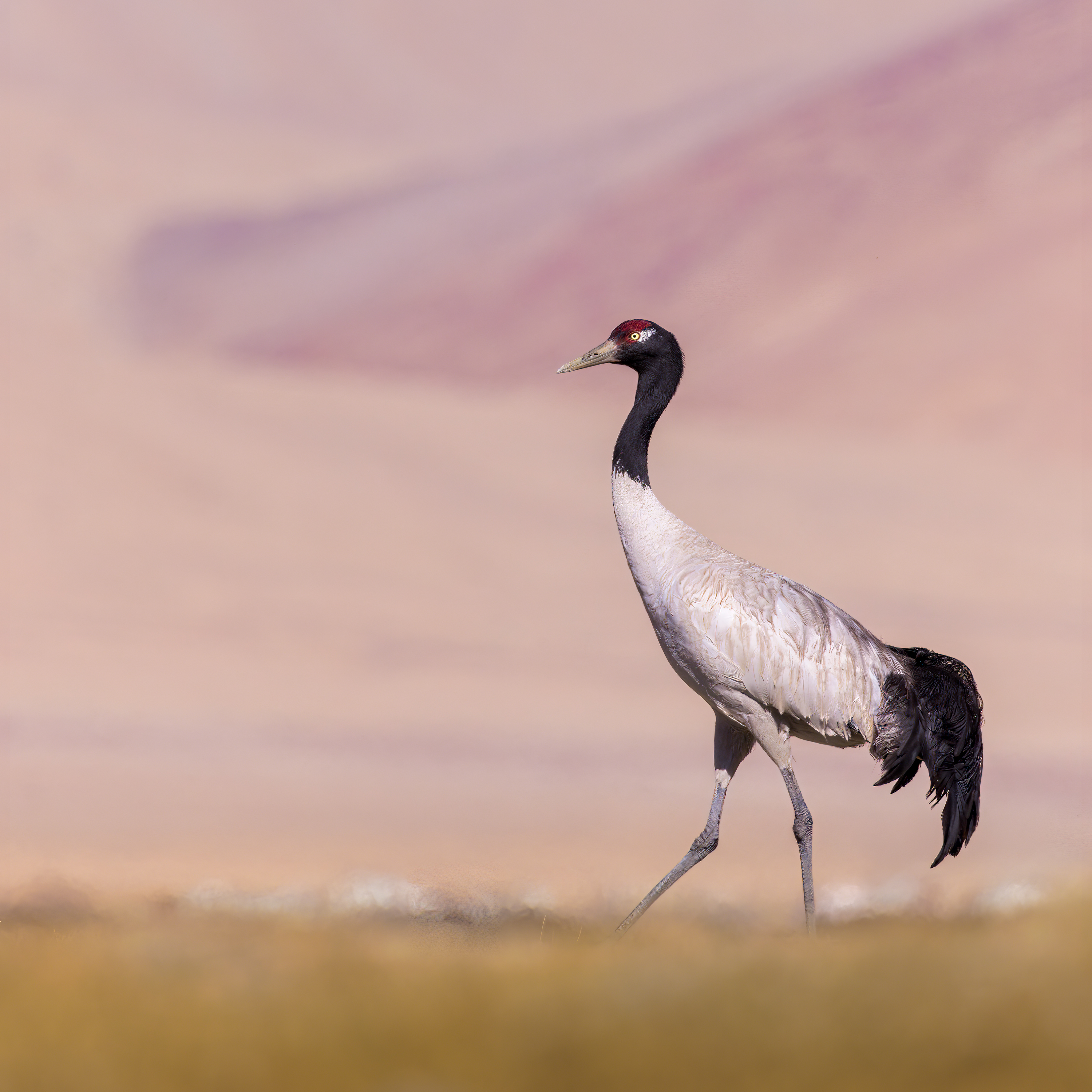
The black-necked crane is the state bird of Ladakh. Photograph taken in Hanle

Scant precipitation makes Ladakh a high-altitude desert with extremely scarce vegetation over most of its area. Natural vegetation mainly occurs along water courses and on high altitude areas that receive more snow and cooler summer temperatures. Human settlements, however, are richly vegetated due to irrigation. Natural vegetation commonly seen along watercourses includes seabuckthorn (Hippophae spp.), wild roses of pink or yellow varieties, tamarisk (Myricaria spp.), caraway, stinging nettles, mint, Physochlaina praealta, and various grasses. About 1250 plant species, including crops, were reported from Ladakh. The plant Ladakiella klimesii, growing up to 6,150 metres (20,180 ft) above sea level, was first described here and named after this region. The first European to study the wildlife of this region was William Moorcroft in 1820, followed by Ferdinand Stoliczka, an Austrian-Czech palaeontologist, who carried out a massive expedition there in the 1870s. There are many lakes in Ladakh such as Kyago Tso.

The bharal (or blue sheep) is the most abundant mountain ungulate in the Ladakh region, although it is not found in some parts of Zangskar and Sham areas. The bharal is one of the preferred choices of prey of the rare snow leopard. The Asiatic ibex is a mountain goat that is distributed in the western part of Ladakh. It is the second-most abundant mountain ungulate in the region, with a population of about 6,000 individuals. It is adapted to rugged areas where it easily climbs near-vertical rock faces when threatened. The Ladakhi urial is another unique mountain sheep that inhabits the mountains of Ladakh. The population is declining, however, and there are not more than 3,000 individuals left in Ladakh. The urial is endemic to Ladakh, where it is distributed only along two major river valleys, namely the Indus and Shyok. The animal is often persecuted by farmers, whose crops are allegedly damaged by flocks of urial. Its population declined dramatically in the late twentieth century, due to indiscriminate shooting by hunters along the Leh-Srinagar Highway.

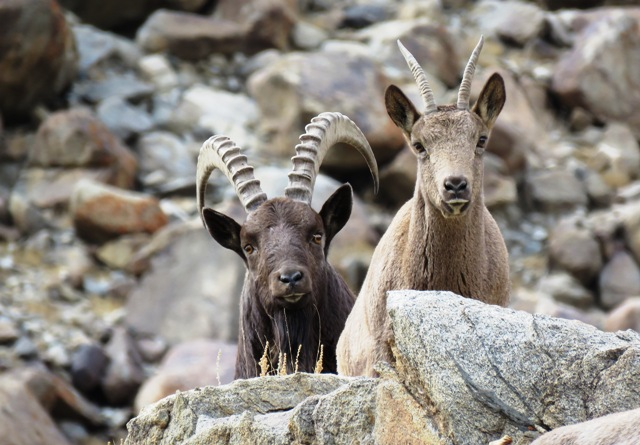
A male and female Ibex in Phyang

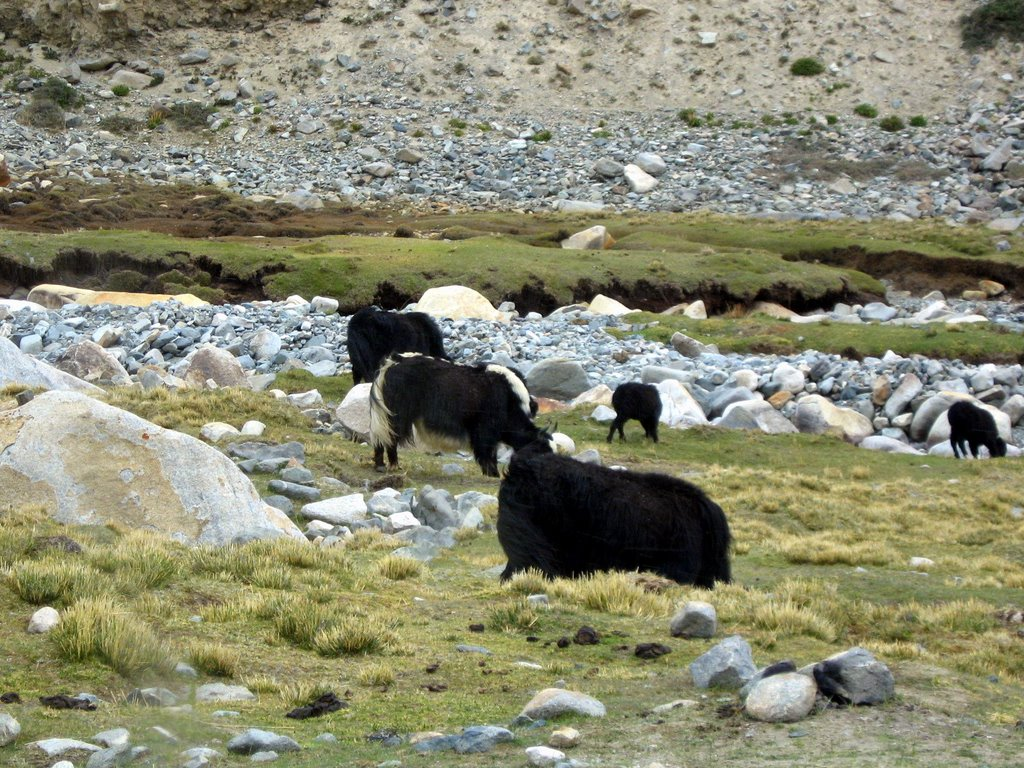
Yaks on the way to Pangong Tso

The Tibetan argali (or nyan) is the largest wild sheep species in the world, standing 1.1 to 1.2 metres (3.5 to 4 ft) at the shoulder, possessing very large, curled horns measuring 900–1,000 mm (35–39 in). It is distributed on the Tibetan Plateau and its marginal ranges, encompassing a total home range of 2.5 million km^{2} (0.97 million sq mi); however, there is only a small population, of about 400 animals, in Ladakh. Unlike other mountain sheep and goat species, the argali prefers open, grassy fields and rolling hills as it prefers to run, rather than climb into steep terrain, to flee from danger. The endangered Tibetan antelope, or chiru in Indian English (or Ladakhi tsos), has traditionally been hunted for its wool (shahtoosh), a natural fibre of some of the finest quality. The wool of the Tibetan antelope is prized for its lightweight feel and as a status symbol. The wool must be pulled out by hand, a process done after the animal is killed. The fibre is smuggled into Kashmir and woven into exquisite shawls by Kashmiri workers. Ladakh is also home to the Tibetan gazelle, which inhabits the vast rangelands in eastern Ladakh bordering Tibet.

The kiang, or Tibetan wild ass, is common in the grasslands of Changthang, numbering about 2,500 individuals. These animals are in conflict with the nomadic people of Changthang who hold the Kiang responsible for pasture degradation. There are about 200 snow leopards in Ladakh of an estimated 7,000 worldwide. The Hemis High Altitude National Park in central Ladakh is an especially good habitat for this predator as it has abundant prey populations. The Eurasian lynx is another rare cat that preys on smaller herbivores in Ladakh. It is mostly found in Nubra, Changthang and Zangskar. The Pallas's cat, which looks somewhat like a house cat, is very rare in Ladakh and not much is known about the species. The Tibetan wolf, which sometimes preys on the livestock of the Ladakhis, is the most persecuted among the predators. There are also a few brown bears in the Suru Valley and the area around Dras. The Tibetan sand fox has been discovered in this region. Among smaller animals, marmots, hares, and several types of pika and vole are common.

== Administration ==
Banner of the Administration of Ladakh

Under the terms of the Jammu and Kashmir Reorganisation Act, Ladakh is administered as a union territory without a legislative assembly or elected government. The head of government is a Lieutenant Governor appointed by the President of India who is assisted by civil servants of the Indian Administrative Service.

=== Districts ===
District	Headquarters	Area (km^{2})	Population (2011 Census)	Established	Autonomous District Council	URL
Kargil	Kargil	4,000	75,000	1979	LAHDC Kargil	http://kargil.nic.in/
Leh	Leh	12,000	60,000	1979	LAHDC Leh	http://leh.nic.in/
Changthang	Nyoma	21,000	25,000	2026	LAHDC Changthang	
Drass	Drass-Rambirpura	2,646	45,000	2026	LAHDC Drass	
Nubra	Diskit	9,500	35,000	2026	LAHDC Nubra	
Sham	Khaltse	14,086	15,000	2026	LAHDC Sham	
Sankoo	Sankoo	4,000	40,548	2026	LAHDC Sankoo	
Zanskar	Padum	3,000	20,000	2026	LAHDC Zanskar	
Total		66,232	275,000			

As of 2026, the Indian-administered union territory of Ladakh consists of 8 notified districts. They include Kargil (with 45 revenue villages), Drass (19), Sankoo (35), Sham (27), Changthang (24), Nubra (30), Leh (44) and Zanskar (26), with a total of 151 revenue villages. Out of the eight districts, first three are Muslim majority while the rest have a Buddhist majority.

==== Municipalities ====
- Municipal Committee Leh
- Municipal Committee Kargil

==== Autonomous District Councils ====
Ladakh is administered by 8 autonomous district councils, they are:

- LAHDC, Changthang
- LAHDC, Drass
- LAHDC, Kargil
- LAHDC, Leh
- LAHDC, Nubra
- LAHDC, Sankoo
- LAHDC, Sham
- LAHDC, Zanskar

The eight autonomous district councils work with village panchayats to take decisions on economic development, healthcare, education, land use, taxation, and local governance which are further reviewed at the block headquarters in the presence of the chief executive councillor and executive councillors.

=== Law enforcement and justice ===
Ladakh is under the jurisdiction of the High Court of Jammu & Kashmir and Ladakh. The union territory of Ladakh has its own police force headed by a director general of police.

=== Ladakh in the Parliament of India ===
Ladakh sends one member (MP) to the lower house of the Indian parliament, the Lok Sabha. The MP for the Ladakh constituency in the current Lok Sabha is Mohmad Haneefa, who was elected as an independent candidate.

== Economy ==
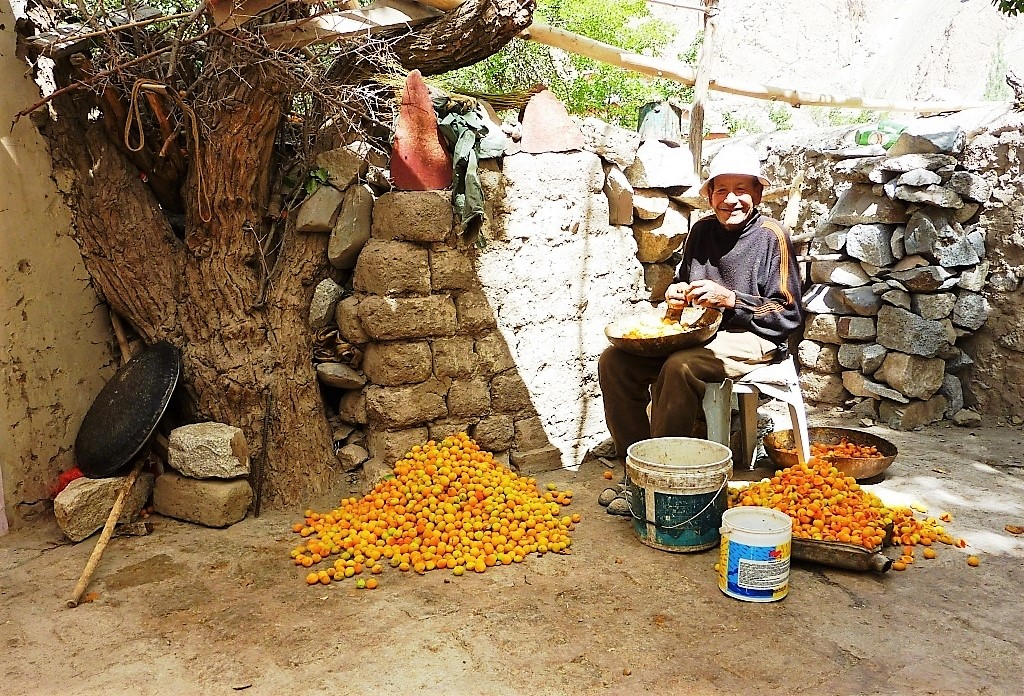
Preparing apricots, Alchi Monastery

The land is irrigated by a system of channels which funnel water from the ice and snow of the mountains. The principal crops are barley and wheat. Rice was previously a luxury in the Ladakhi diet, but, subsidised by the government, has now become a cheap staple.

Naked barley (Ladakhi: nas, Urdu: grim) was traditionally a staple crop all over Ladakh. Growing times vary considerably with altitude. The extreme limit of cultivation is at Korzok, on the Tso-moriri lake, at 4,600 m (15,100 ft), which has what are widely considered to be the highest fields in the world.

A minority of Ladakhi people were also employed as merchants and caravan traders, facilitating trade in textiles, carpets, dyestuffs and narcotics between Punjab and Xinjiang. However, since the Chinese Government closed the borders between Tibet Autonomous Region and Ladakh, this international trade has completely dried up.

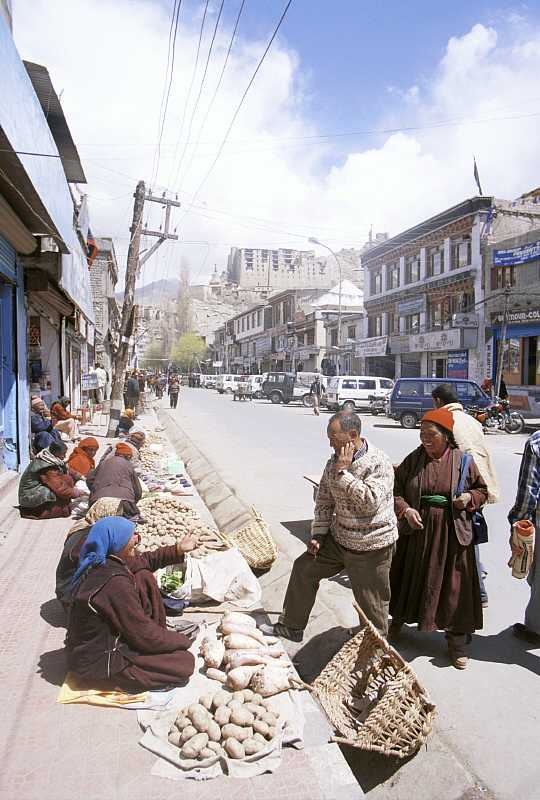
Street market in Leh

Indus river flowing in the Ladakh region is endowed with vast hydropower potential. Solar and wind power potentials are also substantial. Though the region is a remote hilly area without all-weather roads, the area is also rich in limestone deposits to manufacture cement from the locally available cheap electricity for various construction needs.

Since 1974, the Indian Government has encouraged a shift in trekking and other tourist activities from the troubled Kashmir region to the relatively unaffected areas of Ladakh. Although tourism employs only 4% of Ladakh's working population, it accounted for 50% of the region's GNP in the year 2000.

Since then, tourism has increased, exceeding 500,000 people in 2022 and 2023. The sharpest growth began after 2010 when the Bollywood film 3 Idiots —filmed in part on the Pangong Lake in Ladakh — became a big hit in India. This is a contrast to the population of Leh, 31,000. This increase adds to the economy but it is having negative effects on the land due to the increase in waste and increasing water scarcity.

21st century is recorded in Arthur Neves The Tourist's Guide to Kashmir, Ladakh, and Skardo, first published in 1911, described in the Lonely Planet travel guide in 2002.

== Transportation ==
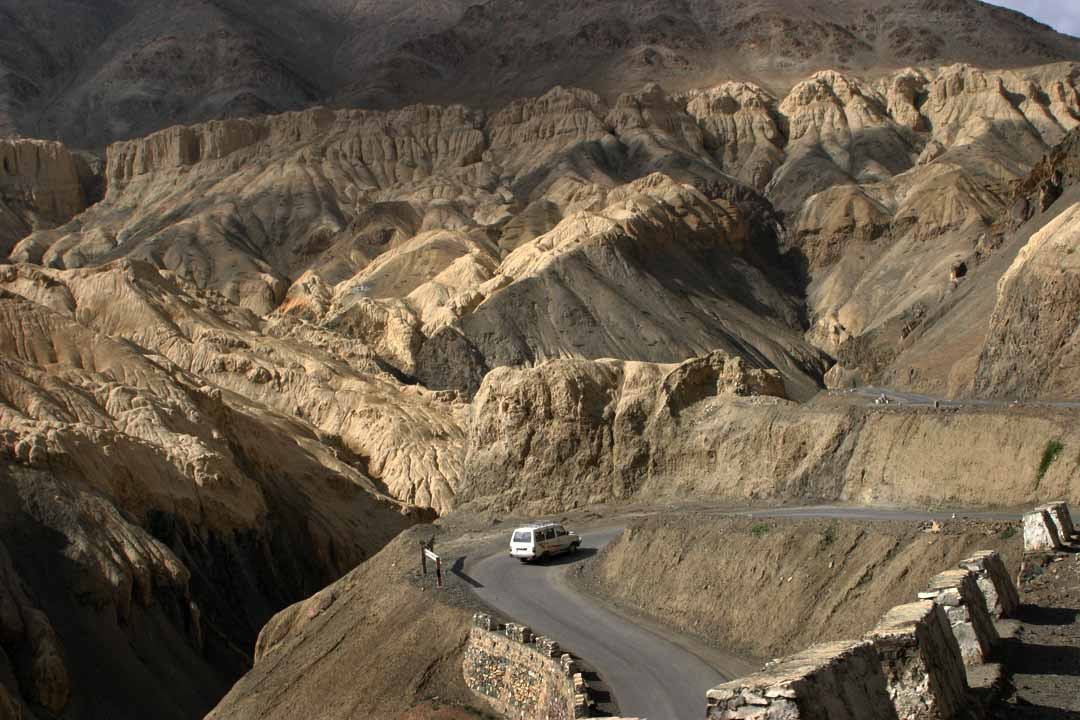
A vehicle on the Himalaya Highway 3

There are about 1,800 km (1,100 mi) of roads in Ladakh of which 800 km (500 mi) are surfaced. The majority of roads in Ladakh are looked after by the Border Roads Organisation. There are two main roads that connect Ladakh with the rest of the country, NH1 connecting Srinagar to Kargil and Leh, and NH3 connecting Manali to Leh. A third road to Ladakh is the Nimmu–Padam–Darcha road, which is under construction.

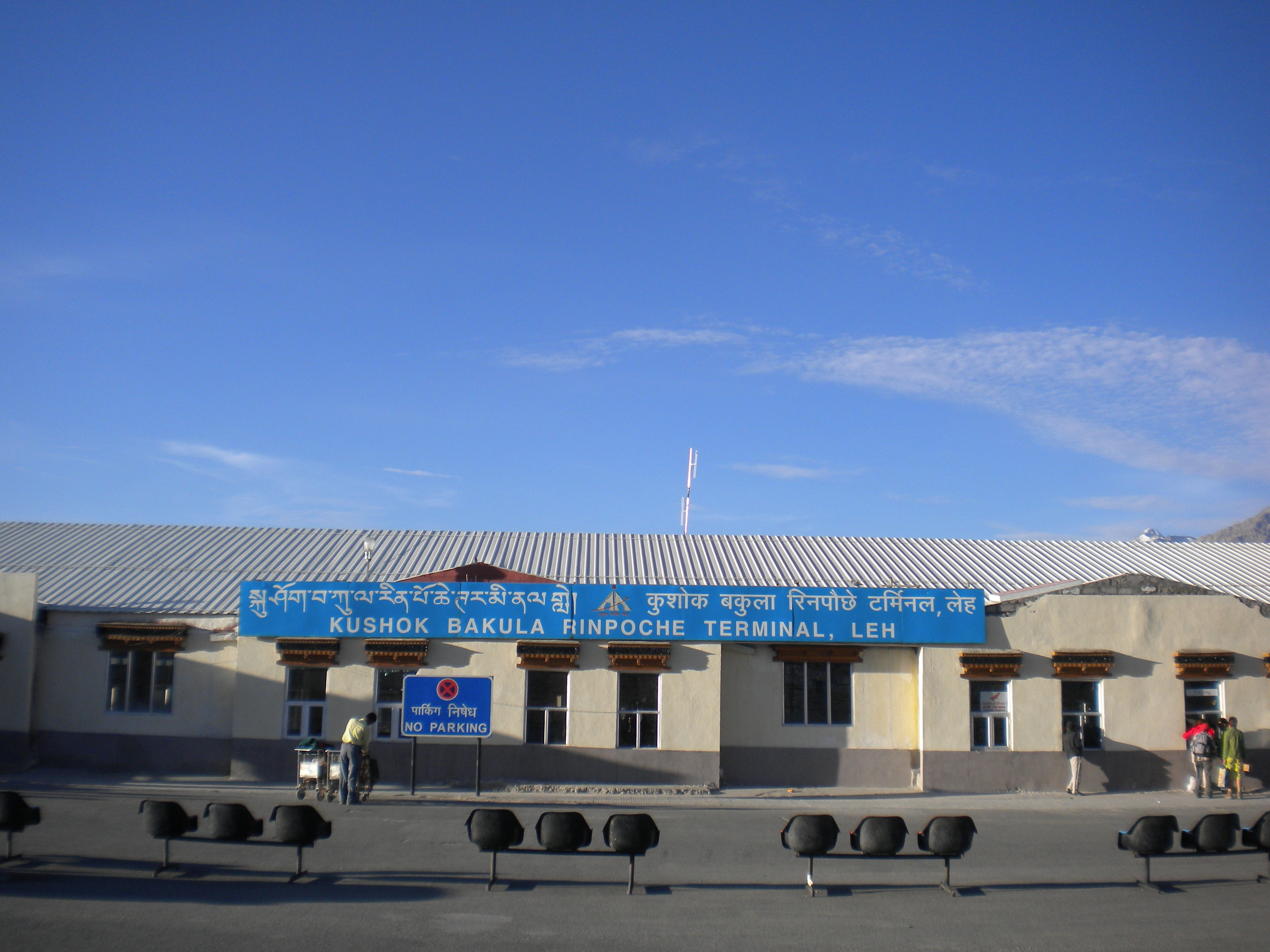
Kushok Bakula Rimpochee Airport

There is an airport in Leh, Kushok Bakula Rimpochee Airport, from which there are daily flights to Delhi and weekly flights to Srinagar and Jammu. There are two airstrips at Daulat Beg Oldie and Fukche for military transport. The airport at Kargil, Kargil Airport, was intended for civilian flights but is currently used by the Indian Army. The airport is a political issue for the locals who argue that the airport should serve its original purpose, i.e., should open up for civilian flights. Since past few years the Indian Air Force has been operating AN-32 air courier service to transport the locals during the winter seasons to Jammu, Srinagar and Chandigarh. A private aeroplane company Air Mantra landed a 17-seater aircraft at the airport, in the presence of dignitaries like the Chief Minister Omar Abdullah, marking the first ever landing by a civilian airline company at Kargil Airport.

== Demographics ==
=== Population ===
Historical population
Year	Pop.	±% p.a.
1951	82,340	—
1961	88,651	+0.74%
1971	105,291	+1.74%
1981	134,372	+2.47%
1991	167,700	+2.24%
2001	232,924	+3.34%
2011	274,289	+1.65%

The sex ratio for Leh district declined from 1011 females per 1000 males in 1951 to 805 in 2001, while for Kargil district it declined from 970 to 901. The urban sex ratio in both the districts is about 640. The adult sex ratio reflects large numbers of mostly male seasonal and migrant labourers and merchants. About 84% of Ladakh's population lives in villages. The average annual population growth rate from 1981 to 2001 was 2.75% in Leh District and 2.83% in Kargil district.

=== Ethnicity ===
The population of Ladakh comprises diverse linguistic, ethnic, and religious groups.Tibetans, Mons, and Dards are the three major ethnolinguistic groups in Ladakh. Other main ethnolinguistic groups include Ladakhi, Boto, Changpa, Brokpa, Argon, Balti, Garra, Beda, Purik, and Shina.

Ladakh is also home to minority groups such as Gujjars and Bakarwals, who mainly live in the Zanskar, Leh, Nubra, and Kargil districts.

As per 2011 census, Scheduled Tribes constituted 79.5% of Ladakh's population, Scheduled Castes constituted 0.37% and the remaining 20.13% belonged to Forward Castes. Eight tribes, such as the Bot, Mon, Beda, Purigpa, Brokpa, Shina, Balti, and Changpa, were given Scheduled Tribe status by the Government of India in 1989.

=== Languages ===
==== Main languages ====
Languages of Ladakh (2011 census)
1. Ladakhi (Bhoti) (40.4%)
2. Purgi (33.6%)
3. Hindi (8.93%)
4. Shina (5.05%)
5. Balti (3.58%)
6. Tibetan (2.33%)
7. Punjabi (1.00%)
8. Others (5.11%)

In Leh region, Ladakhi (also called Bhotia/Bauti) is the predominant language, spoken by 40.4% of the population. In Kargil region, Purgi is the predominant language, spoken by 33.60% of the population. Ladakh has many regional languages like Chang-pa, and Zangskari, but speakers can understand each other. Overall in Ladakh, Hindi is spoken by 9%, Shina by 4.3%, Balti by 3.5%, Kashmiri by 1.1%, Punjabi by 1%, and Marathi by 0.7% of the population.

Most Ladakhis, especially the young people, also speak English and Hindi fluently due to administrative work and school education.

==== Other languages ====
3.8% of other languages are spoken in Ladakh, each accounting for less than 1% of the population, including Nepali 0.5%, Dogri 0.3%, Telugu 0.3%, Tamil 0.3%, Bengali 0.2%, Malayalam 0.2%, Assamese 0.2%, Urdu 0.1%, Kannada 0.1%, Gujarati 0.1% and Gujari 0.1%.

The remaining 0.72% speak other minor languages, including Odia, Maithali, Lushei Mizo, Tripuri, Khasi, Sherpa, Tamang, Kinnauri, and Manipuri.

=== Religion ===
Religions in Ladakh (2011 census)
1. Islam (46.4%)
2. Buddhism (39.6%)
3. Hinduism (12.1%)
4. Sikhism (0.83%)
5. Christianity (0.46%)
6. Jainism (0.05%)
7. Other (0.02%)
8. Religion not stated (0.47%)

The Dras and Dha-Hanu regions are inhabited by Brokpa, Drokpa, Dard and Shinu tribes and Shina people respectively, who are predominately followers of Islam while small minorities follow Tibetan Buddhism and Hinduism. The region's population is split roughly in half between the districts of Leh and Kargil. 76.87% population of Kargil is Muslim (mostly Shia), with a total population of 140,802, while that of Leh is 66.40% Buddhist, with a total population of 133,487, as per the 2011 census. Gurjars and Bakarwals are predominantly Sunni Muslims.

== Culture ==
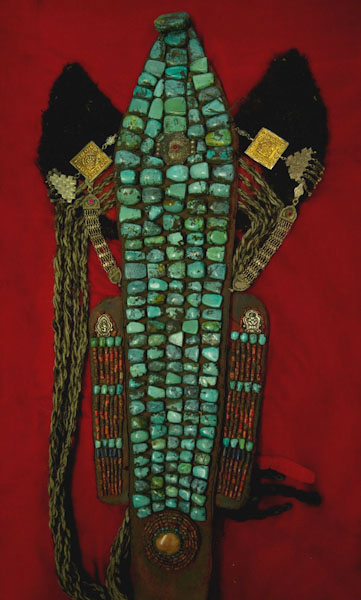
A traditional Ladakhi perak headdress worn by women, made of turquoise, coral, silver and wool

Ladakhi culture is similar to Tibetan culture. Weaving is an important part of traditional life in eastern Ladakh. Both women and men weave, on different looms.

=== Cuisine ===
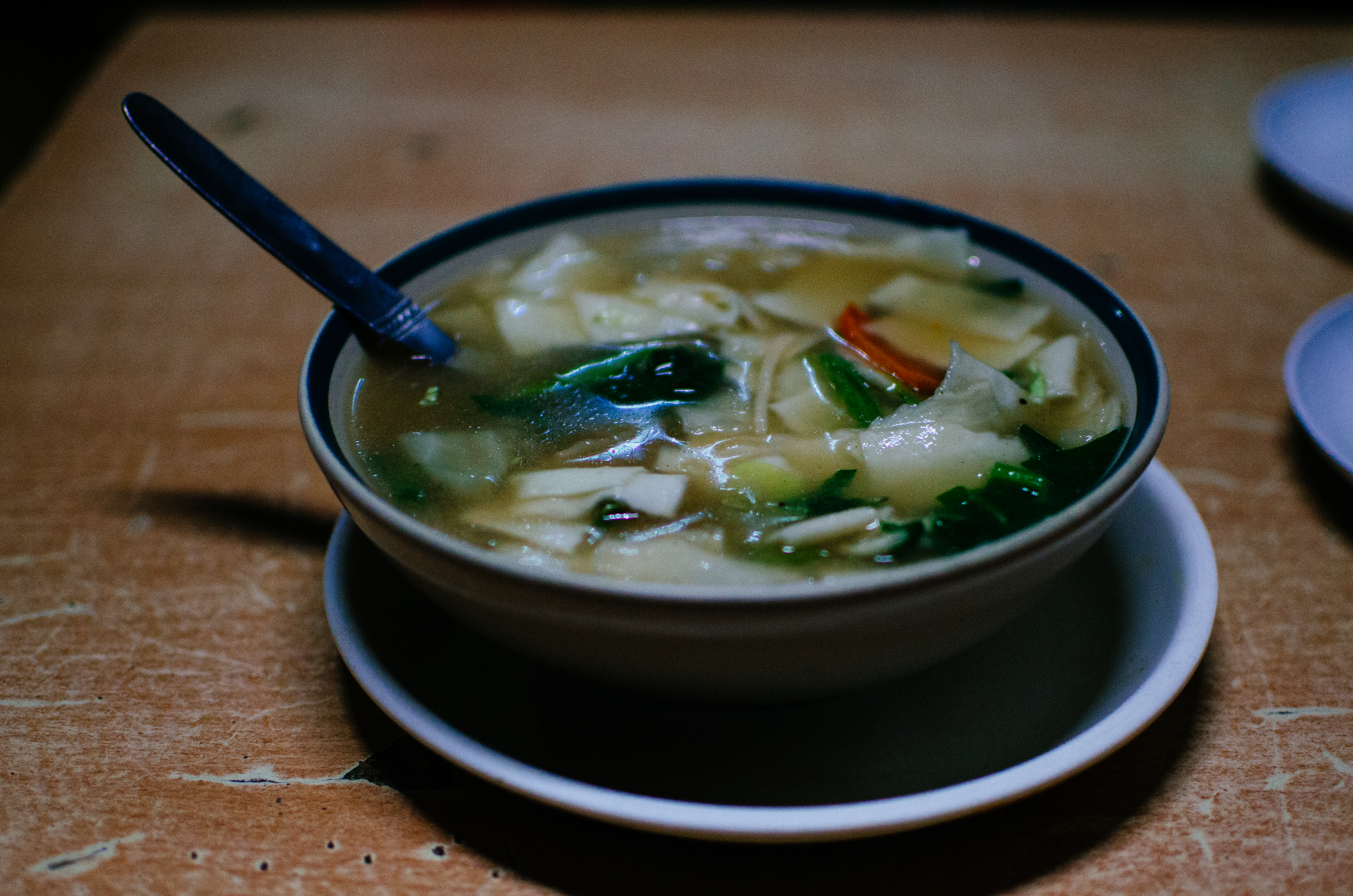
Thukpa

Ladakhi food has much in common with Tibetan food, the most prominent foods being thukpa (noodle soup) and tsampa, known in Ladakhi as ngampe (roasted barley flour). Edible without cooking, tsampa makes useful trekking food. Strictly Ladakhi dishes include skyu and chutagi, both heavy and rich soup pasta dishes, skyu being made with root vegetables and meat, and chutagi with leafy greens and vegetables. As Ladakh moves toward a cash-based economy, foods from the plains of India are becoming more common.

Much like in other parts of Central Asia, tea in Ladakh is traditionally made with strong green tea, butter, and salt. It is mixed in a large churn and known as gurgur cha, after the sound it makes when mixed. Sweet tea (cha ngarmo) is common now, made in Indian style with milk and sugar. Most of the surplus barley that is produced is fermented into chang, an alcoholic beverage drunk especially on festive occasions.

=== Music and dance ===
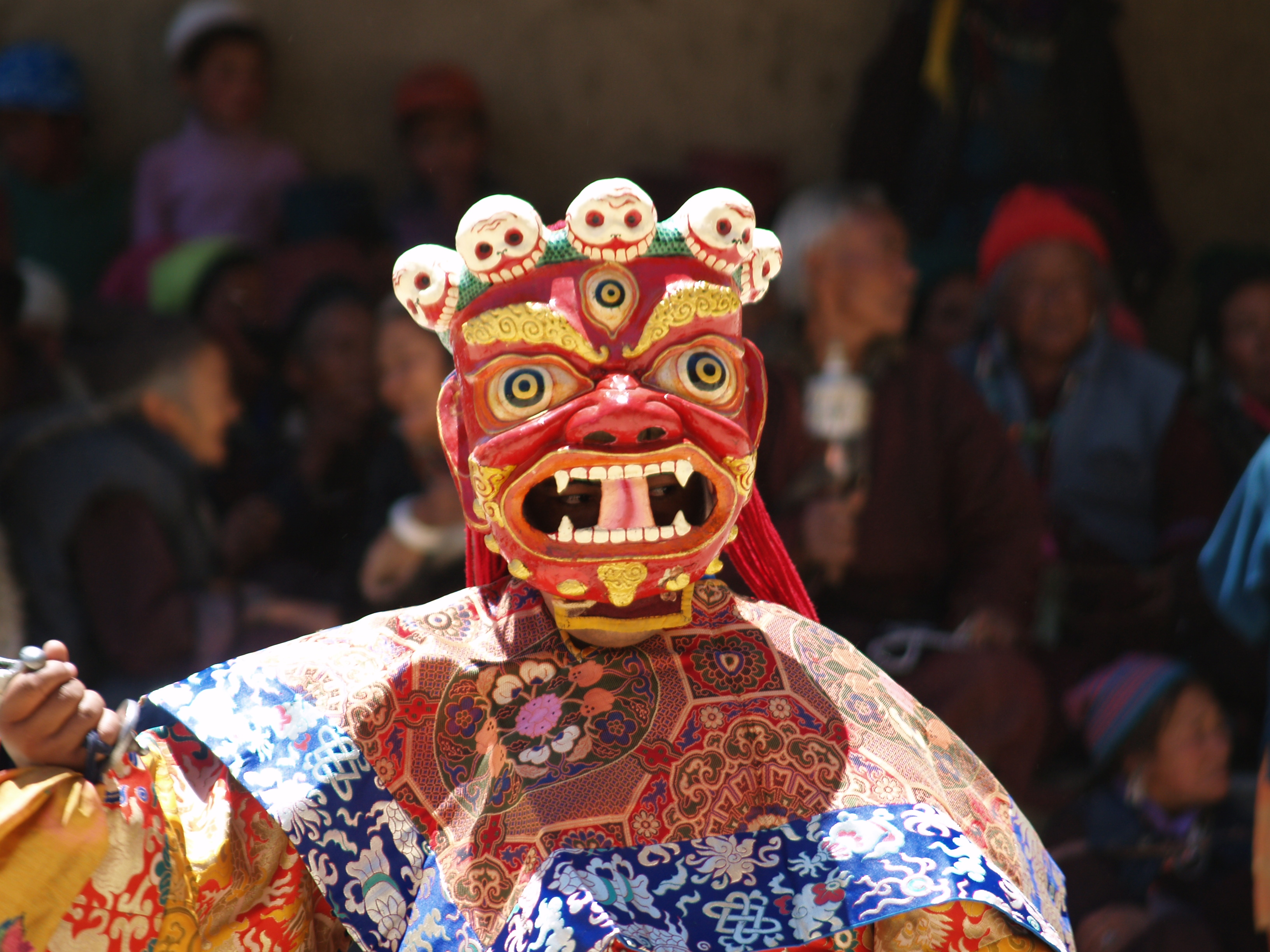
Dancer in masked dance festival

The music of Ladakhi Buddhist monastic festivals, like Tibetan music, often involves religious chanting in Tibetan as an integral part of the religion. These chants are complex, often recitations of sacred texts or in celebration of various festivals. Yang chanting, performed without metrical timing, is accompanied by resonant drums and low, sustained syllables. Religious mask dances are an important part of Ladakh's cultural life. Hemis monastery, a leading centre of the Drukpa tradition of Buddhism, holds an annual masked dance festival, as do all major Ladakhi monasteries.

Ladakh has a variety of dances such as the khatok chenmo, which is headed by a respectable family member, and shondol. Some other dance forms include kompa tsum-tsak, jabro, cham, chabs-skyan tses, raldi tses, and alley yaato.. The dances typically narrate a story of the fight between good and evil, ending with the eventual victory of the former.

=== Sport ===
The most popular sport in Ladakh is ice hockey, which is played only on natural ice generally mid-December through mid-February. Cricket is also very popular.

Archery is a traditional sport in Ladakh, and many villages hold archery festivals, which are as much about traditional dancing, drinking and gambling, as they are about the sport. The sport is conducted with strict etiquette, to the accompaniment of the music of surna and daman (shehnai and drum). Polo, the other traditional sport of Ladakh, is indigenous to Baltistan and Gilgit, and was probably introduced into Ladakh in the mid-17th century by King Singge Namgyal, whose mother was a Balti princess. Polo, popular among the Baltis, is an annual affair in the Dras region of Kargil district.

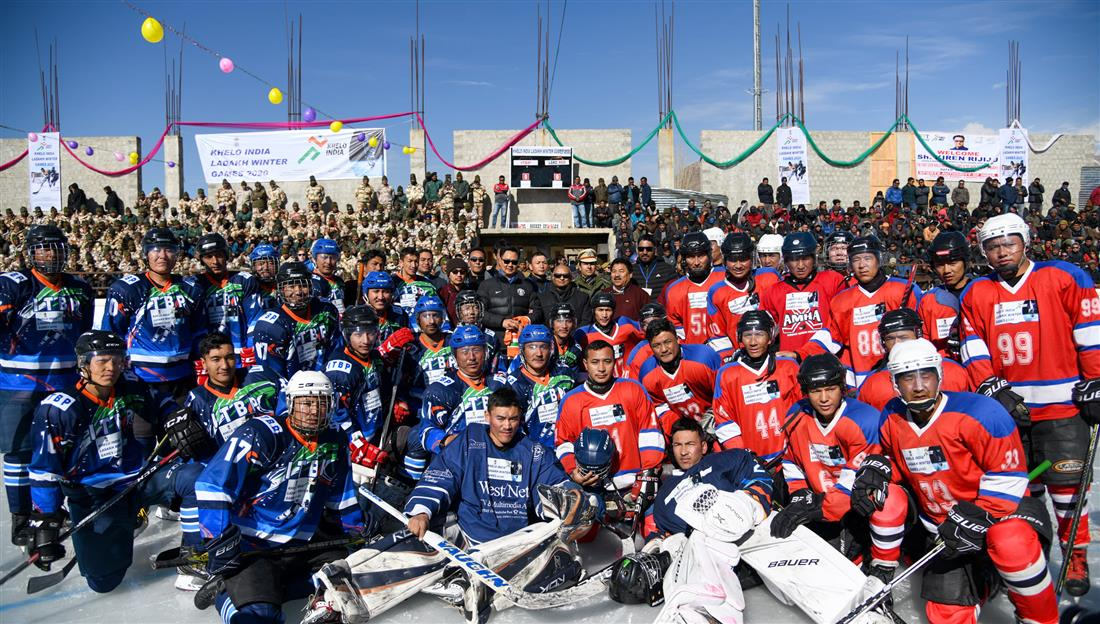
First ever Khelo India Winter Games were held in Ladakh in 2020

The Ladakh Marathon is a high-altitude marathon held in Leh every year since 2012. Held at a height of 11,500 to 17,618 feet (3,505 to 5,370 m), it is one of the world's highest marathons.

=== Social status of women ===
A feature of Ladakhi society that distinguishes it from the rest of India is the high status and relative emancipation enjoyed by women compared to other rural parts of India. Fraternal polyandry and inheritance by primogeniture were common in Ladakh until the early 1940s, when these were made illegal by the government of Jammu and Kashmir. However, the practice remained in existence into the 1990s especially among the elderly and the more isolated rural populations. Another custom is known as khang-bu, or 'little house', in which the elders of a family, as soon as the eldest son has sufficiently matured, retire from participation in affairs, yielding the headship of the family to him and taking only enough of the property for their own sustenance.

=== Traditional medicine ===
Traditional Tibetan medicine, also known as Sowa Rigpa has been the traditional health system of Ladakh for over a thousand years. This school of traditional healing contains elements of Ayurveda and Chinese medicine, combined with the philosophy and cosmology of Tibetan Buddhism. For centuries, the only medical system accessible to the people has been the amchi, traditional doctors following the Traditional Tibetan medicine. Traditional medicine remains a component of public health, especially in remote areas.

Programmes by the government, local and international organisations are working to develop and rejuvenate this traditional system of healing. Efforts are underway to preserve the intellectual property rights of amchi medicine for the people of Ladakh. The government has also been trying to promote the sea buckthorn in the form of juice and jam, as some claim it possesses medicinal properties.

The National Research Institute for Sowa-Rigpa in Leh is an institute for research into traditional medicine and a hospital providing traditional treatments.

== Education ==
According to the 2001 census, the overall literacy rate in Leh District is 62% (72% for males and 50% for females), and in Kargil District 58% (74% for males and 41% for females). Traditionally there was little or nothing by way of formal education except in the monasteries. Usually, one son from every family was obliged to master the Tibetan script in order to read the holy books.

The Moravian Mission opened a school in Leh in October 1889, and the Wazir-i Wazarat (ex officio Joint Commissioner with a British officer) of Baltistan and Ladakh ordered that every family with more than one child should send one of them to school. This order met with great resistance from the local people who feared that the children would be forced to convert to Christianity. The school taught Tibetan, Urdu, English, Geography, Sciences, Nature study, Arithmetic, Geometry and Bible study. It is still in existence today. The first local school to provide western education was opened by a local Society called "Lamdon Social Welfare Society" in 1973. Later, with support from Dalai Lama and some international organisations, the school, now known as Lamdon Model Senior Secondary School, has grown to accommodate approximately two thousand pupils in several branches. It prides itself on preserving Ladakhi tradition and culture.

Schools are well distributed throughout Ladakh but 75% of them provide only primary education. 65% of children attend school, but absenteeism of both students and teachers remains high. In both districts the failure rate at school-leaving level (class X) had for many years been around 85%–95%, while of those managing to scrape through, barely half succeeded in qualifying for college entrance (class XII). Before 1993, students were taught in Urdu until they were 14, after which the medium of instruction shifted to English. In 1994 the Students' Educational and Cultural Movement of Ladakh (SECMOL) launched Operation New Hope (ONH), a campaign to provide "culturally appropriate and locally relevant education" and make government schools more functional and effective. Central Institute of Buddhist Studies a Deemed University in Leh is the oldest institution in this region which mainly focuses on Buddhist philosophy but also offers degrees in different fields.

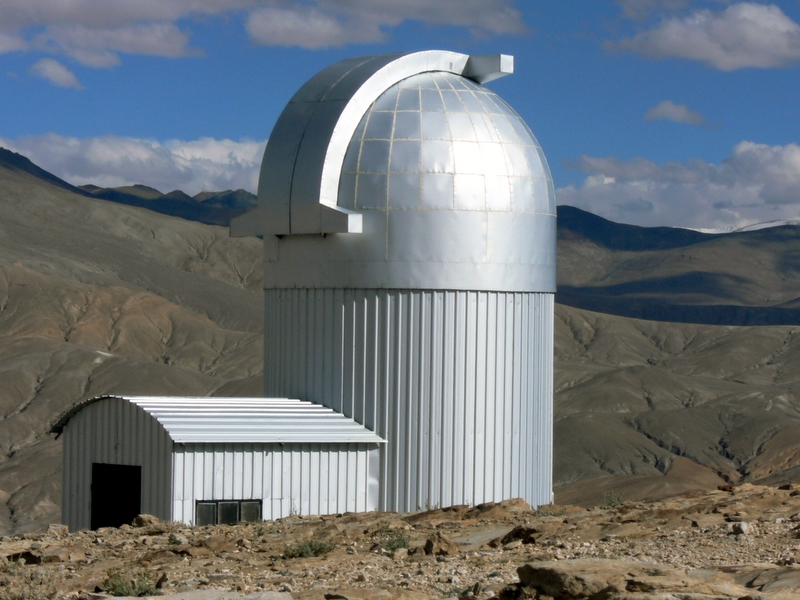
Indian Astronomical Observatory near Leh

The University of Ladakh with its two campuses (One each in Kargil & Leh) and its constituent colleges enables students to pursue higher education without having to leave Ladakh. The Indian Astronomical Observatory is located in Hanle and is operated by the Indian Institute of Astrophysics.

In August 2021, the Parliament of India amended the Central Universities Act to establish a central university in Ladakh named "Sindhu Central University". As of November 2026, there were 832 Government run schools and 113 publicly run private schools in Ladakh.

== Media ==
The public radio broadcaster All India Radio (Akashvani) operates stations in Leh and Kargil (with relay transmitters in areas such as Padum), airing local programming in Ladakhi, Purgi, Urdu, Hindi, and English alongside national broadcasts. On 14 December 2021, Ladakh's first FM radio station was commissioned in Leh. Public television broadcaster Doordarshan operates a studio and Regional News Unit (DD News Ladakh) in Leh, producing regional bulletins and local programming.

Ladakhi filmmakers also produce independent feature films and documentaries—often on modest budgets—that are screened in local auditoriums and community halls, as well as at regional showcases such as The Himalayan Film Festival in Leh.

Local print, broadcast, and digital news outlets covering the Union Territory—including those empanelled with the Department of Information & Public Relations (DIPR), UT Ladakh—include:

- Reach Ladakh Bulletin, a fortnightly English-language newspaper and online news portal based in Leh.
- Voice of Ladakh, a weekly bilingual newspaper and digital news platform based in Kargil.
- Rangyul (also associated with Kargil Number), a daily newspaper covering Kargil and Ladakh in English and Urdu.
- Greater Ladakh, a weekly newspaper published in Ladakh.
- Earth News Ladakh, a daily newspaper and digital news outlet covering the Union Territory.
- Ladakh Times, an online news portal covering Leh, Kargil, and surrounding districts.
- Kargil Today, a Kargil-based digital and YouTube news channel covering local news and current affairs.
- Gulistan News Ladakh, the regional Ladakh bureau and digital channel of Gulistan News, covering news across Leh and Kargil.
- Ladakh People's Voice, a local digital and YouTube news channel covering news and public affairs in Ladakh.
- Stawa, a monthly English-language magazine covering society, culture, and current affairs across Leh and Kargil.

Major regional newspapers based in neighbouring Jammu and Kashmir also maintain dedicated correspondents and sections covering Ladakh, most notably Daily Excelsior, which publishes regular dispatches from Leh and Kargil.

== Gallery ==
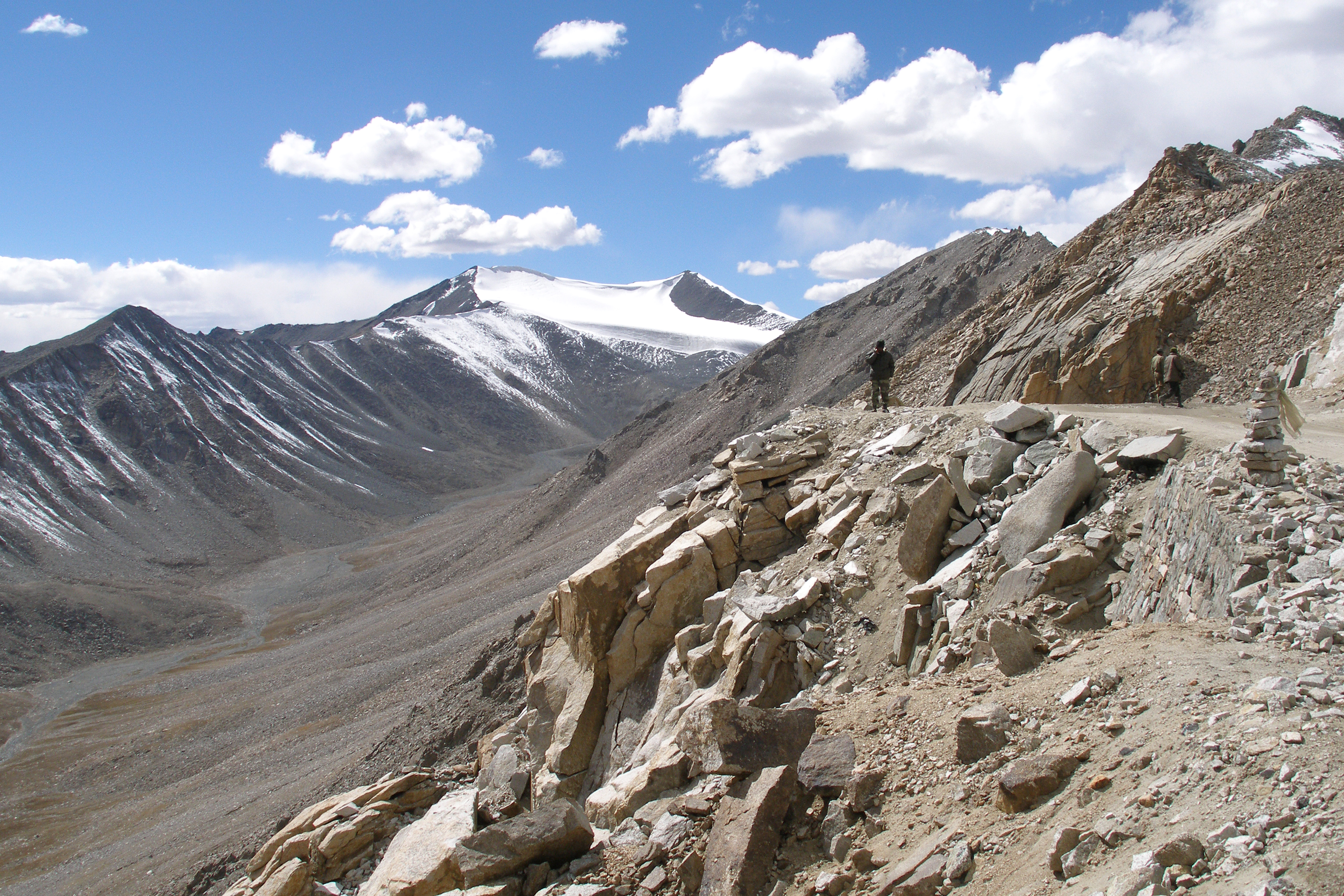
Khardung La

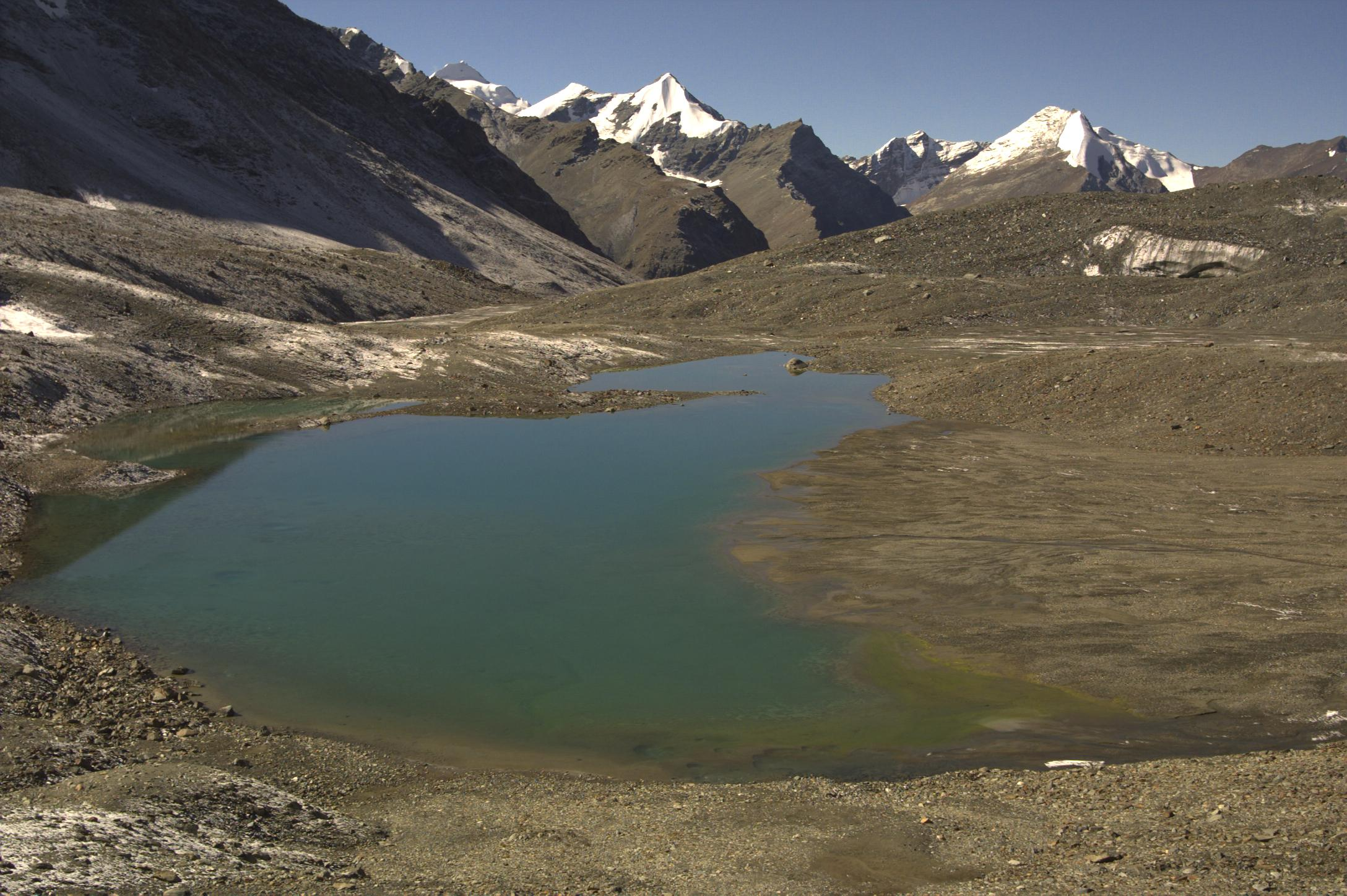
Shingo La

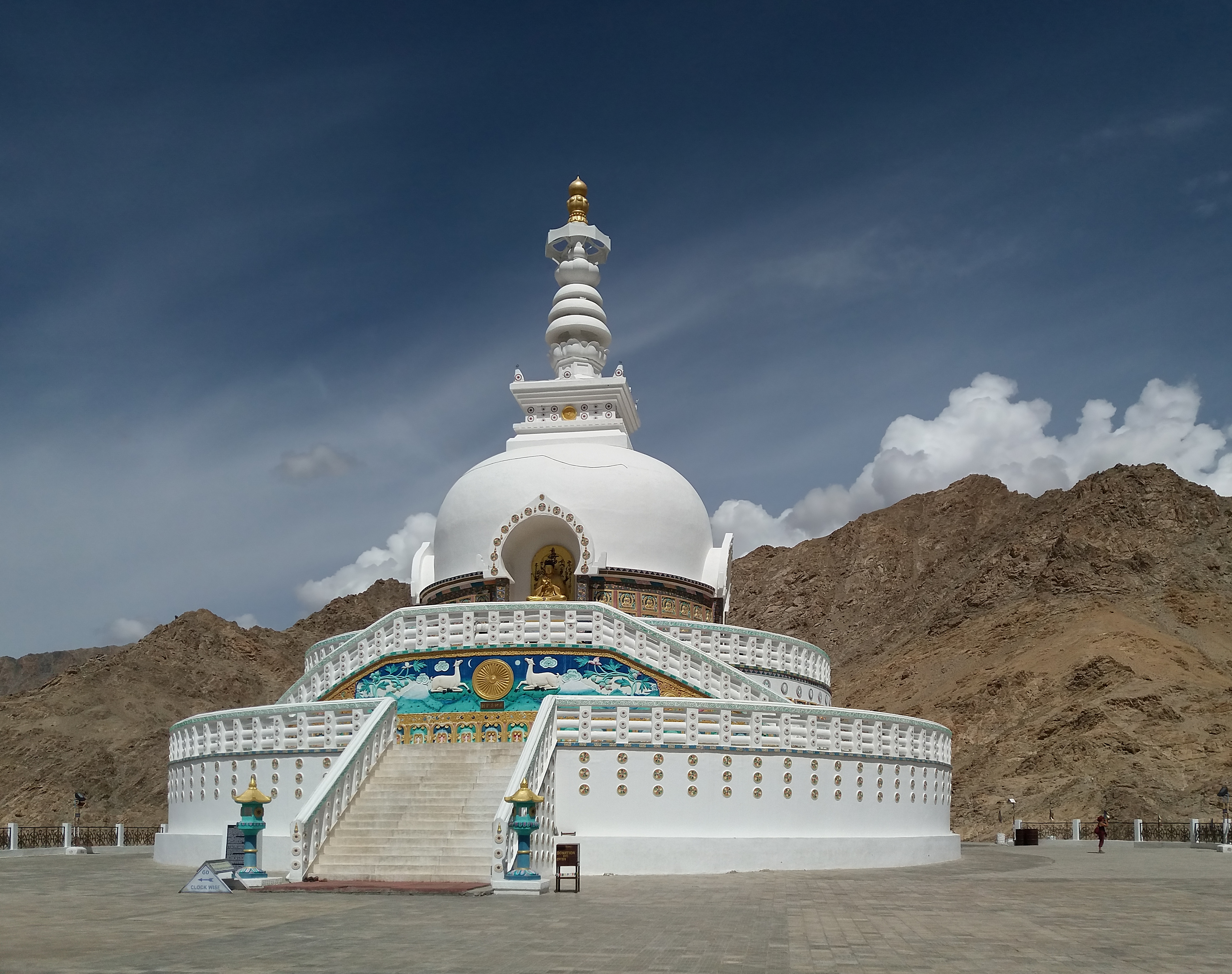
Shanti Stupa, Leh

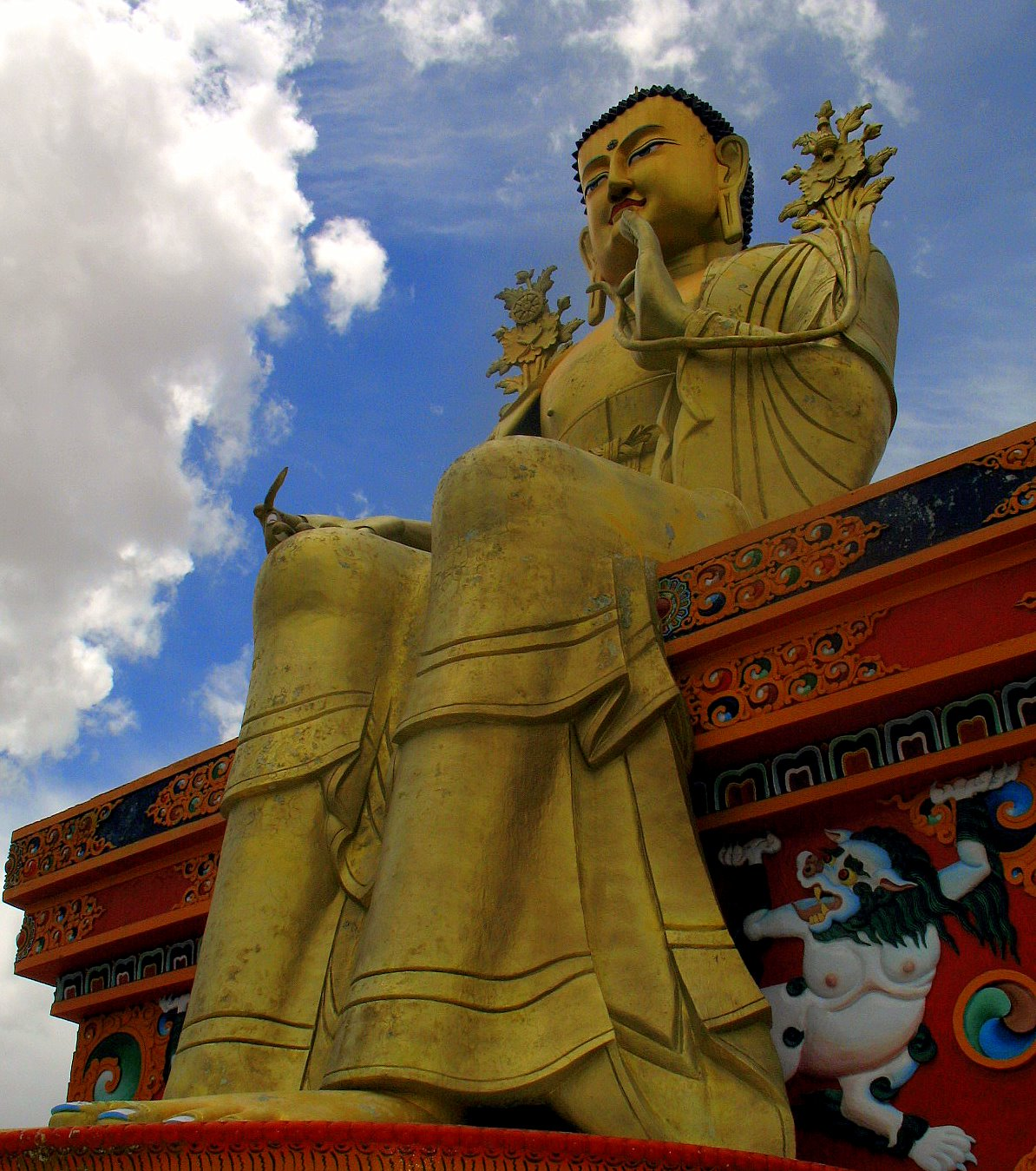
Statue of Maitreya at Likir Monastery, Leh

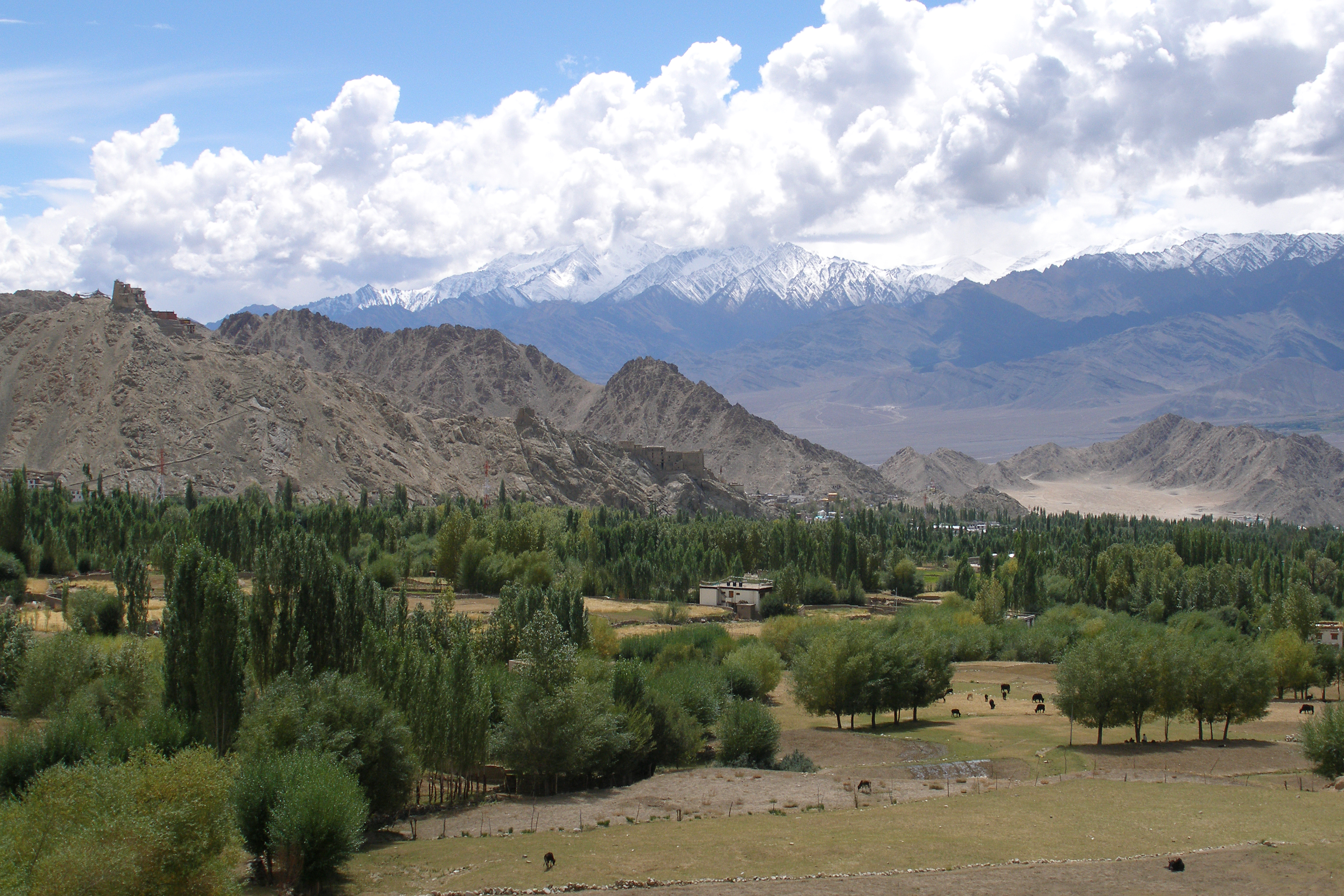
Trees in the Indus Valley near Leh

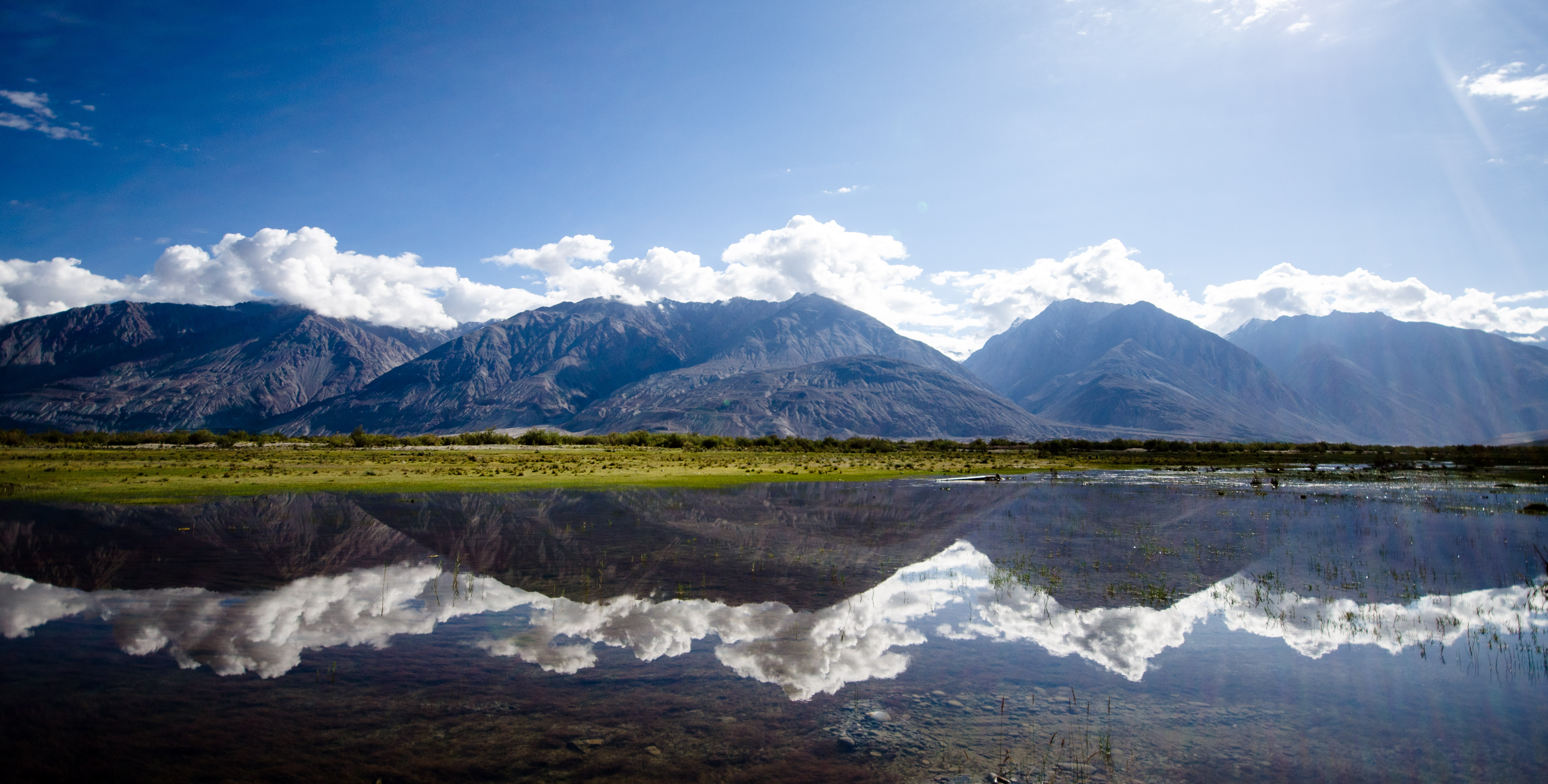
Nubra Valley view with reflection

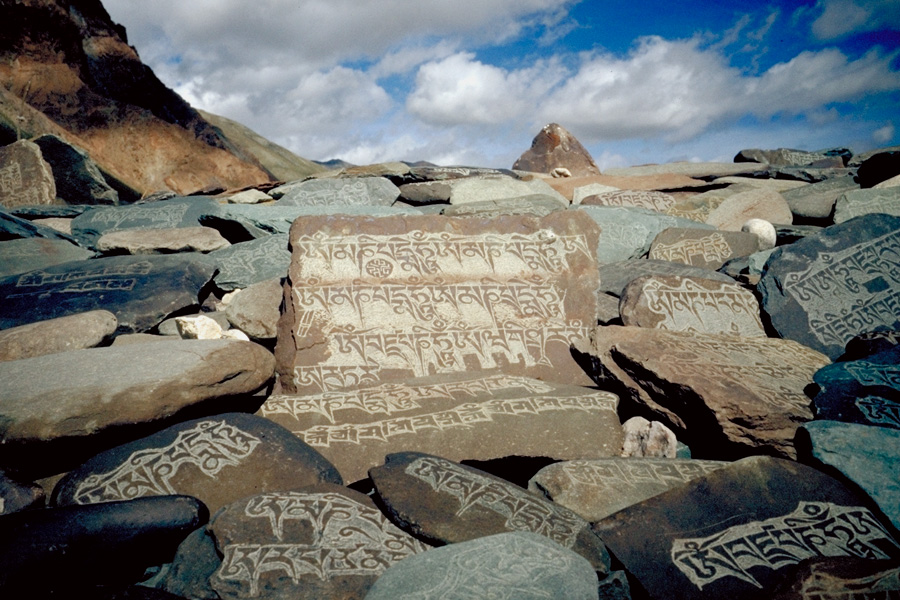
Carved stone tablets, each with the inscription "Om Mani Padme Hum" along the paths of Zanskar

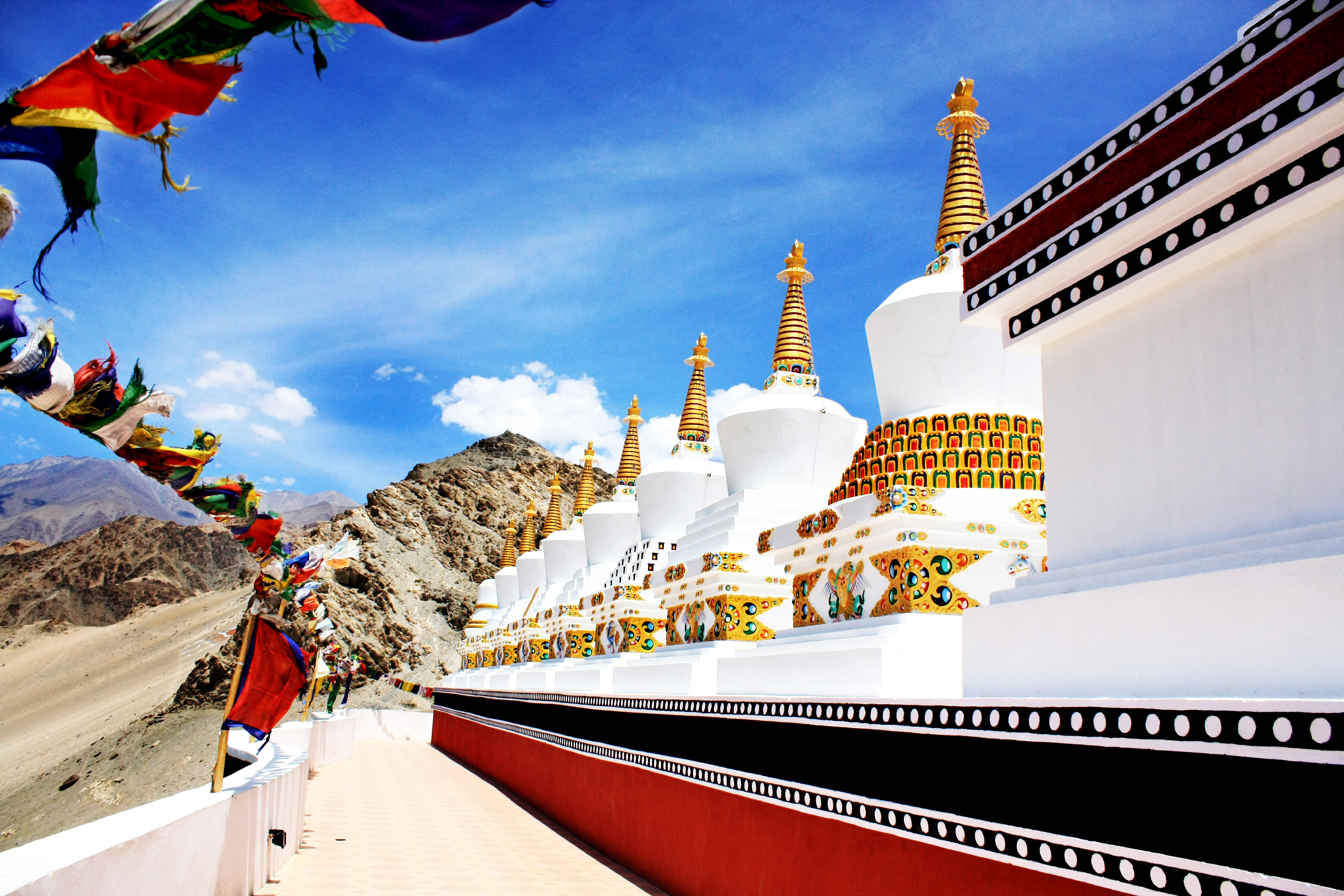
The nine stupas at Thikse Monastery, Thiksey

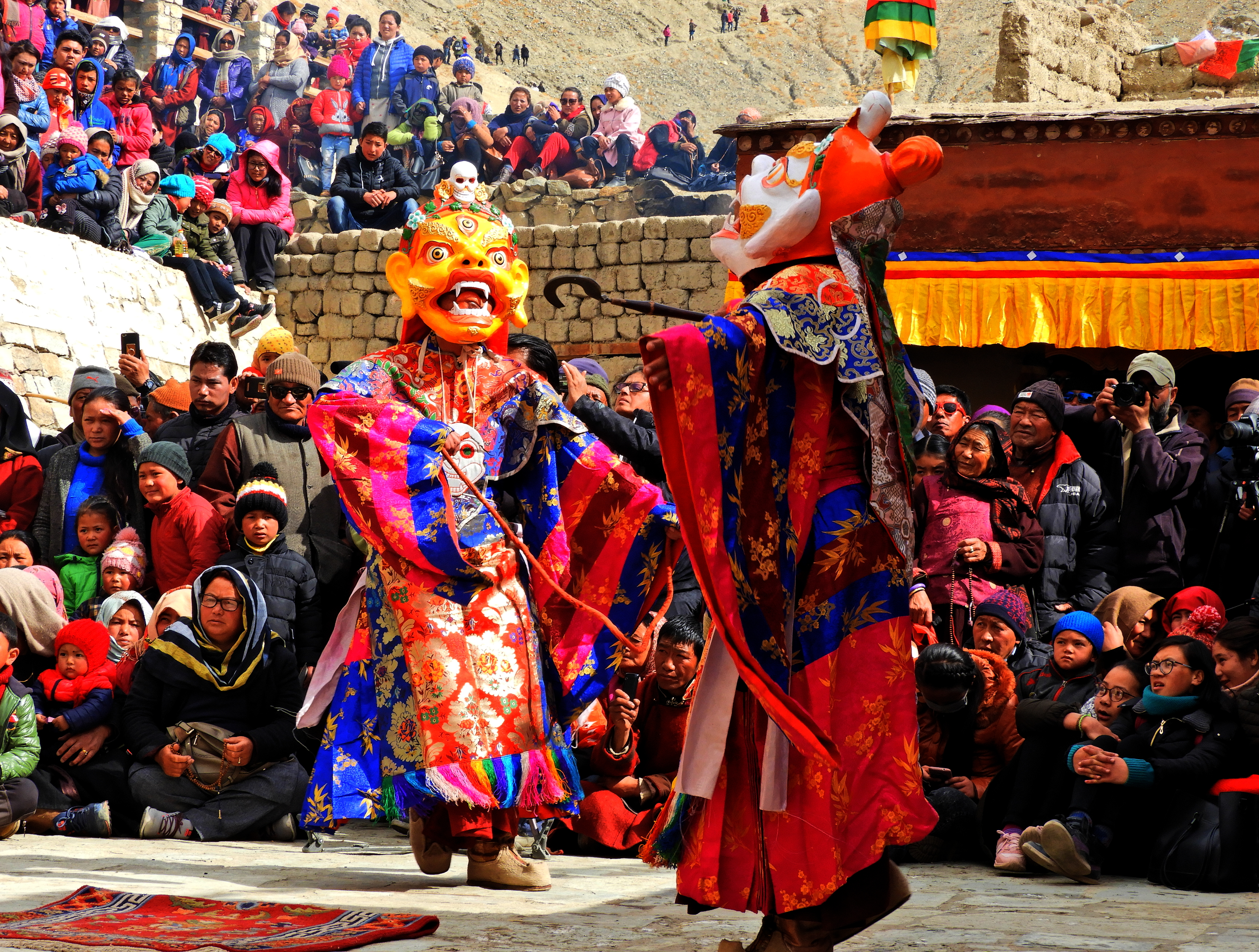
Cham dance during Dosmoche festival in Leh Palace

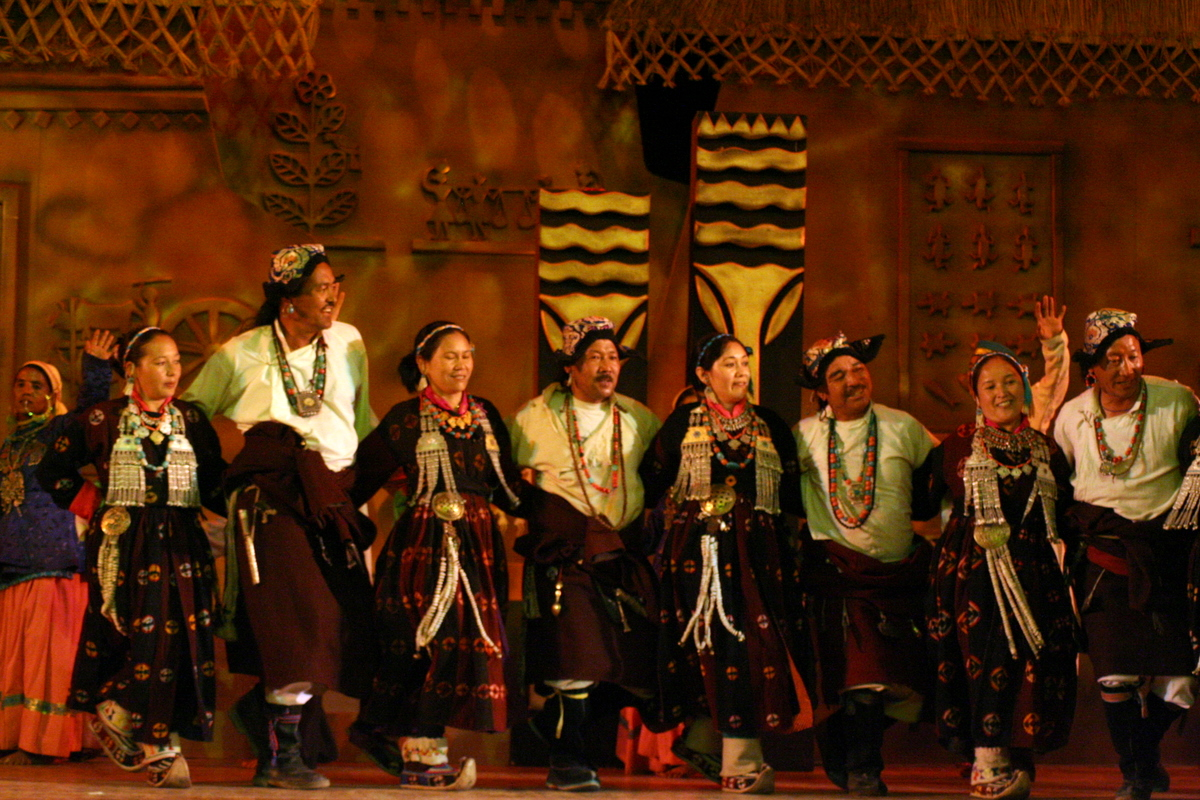
Jabro Dance

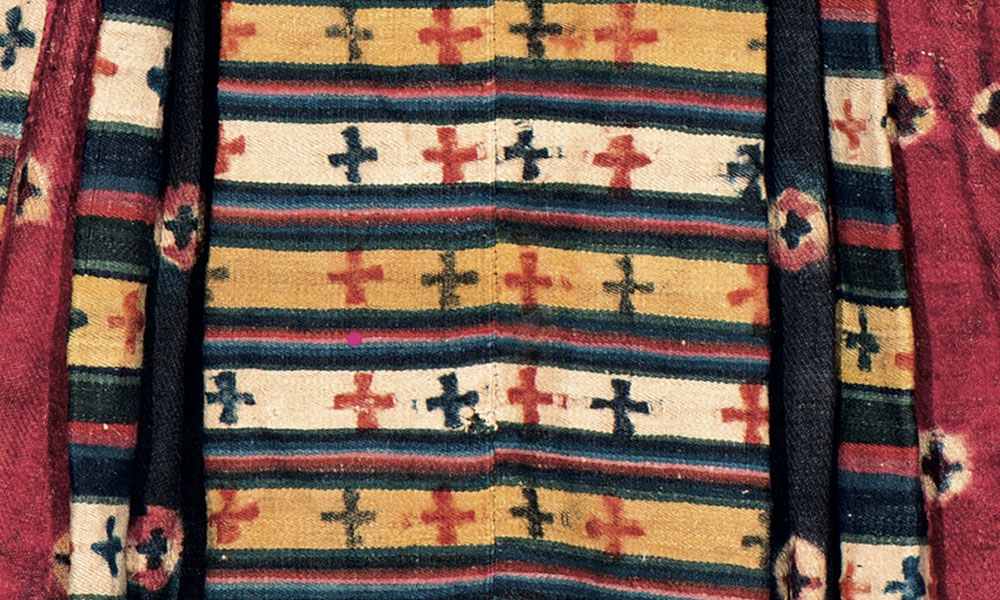
Sul-ma, women's woollen dress (detail), Ladakh, late 19th-early 20th century

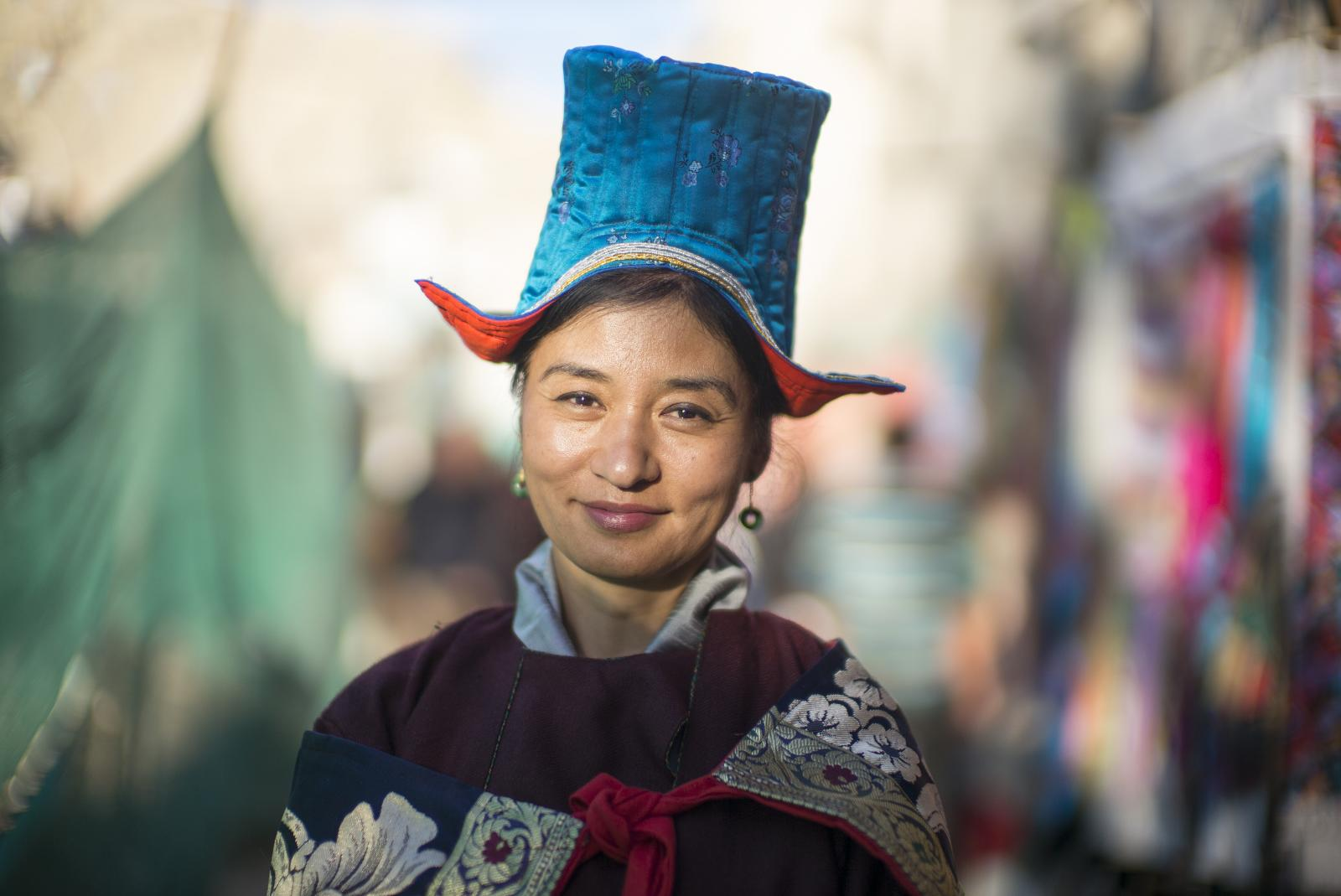
Woman wearing traditional Ladakhi hat

== See also ==
- Ladakh Buddhist Association
- Ladakh Scouts
- Ladakh Wazarat
- Emblem of Ladakh
- List of ultras of the Himalayas

== Sources ==
- Ahmad, Zahiruddin (September–December 1968). "New Light on the Tibet-Ladakh-Mughal War of 1679–84". East and West. 18 (3/4). Instituto Italiano per l'Africa e l'Oriente: 340–361. JSTOR 29755343.
- Emmer, Gerhard (2007), "Dga' Ldan Tshe Dbang Dpal Bzang Po and the Tibet-Ladakh-Mugha1 War of 1679–84", Proceedings of the Tenth Seminar of the IATS, 2003. Volume 9: The Mongolia-Tibet Interface: Opening New Research Terrains in Inner Asia, BRILL, pp. 81–108, ISBN 978-90-474-2171-9
- Fisher, Margaret W.; Rose, Leo E.; Huttenback, Robert A. (1963), Himalayan Battleground: Sino-Indian Rivalry in Ladakh, Praeger, ASIN B0007DVVG2, archived from the original on 27 August 2017 – via Questia
- Francke, August Hermann (1995) [1907], A History of Western Tibet, S. W. Partridge & Co, ISBN 9788120610439 – via archive.org
- Francke, August Hermann (1992) [first published 1926]. Antiquities of Indian Tibet: Volume 38; Volume 50 of New imperial series. Asian Educational Services. p. 94. ISBN 81-206-0769-4.
- Handa, O. C. (2001), Buddhist Western Himalaya: A politico-religious history, Indus Publishing, ISBN 978-81-7387-124-5
- Jina, Prem Singh (1996), Ladakh: The Land and the People, Indus Publishing, ISBN 978-81-7387-057-6
- Lo Bue, Erberto; Bray, John, eds. (2014), "Introduction", Art and Architecture in Ladakh: Cross-cultural Transmissions in the Himalayas and Karakoram, BRILL, ISBN 978-90-04-27180-7
- Dorjay, Phuntsog (2014), "Embedded in Stone—Early Buddhist Rock Art of Ladakh", Ibid, BRILL, pp. 35–67, ISBN 9789004271807
- Howard, Neil; Howard, Kath (2014), "Historic Ruins in the Gya Valley, Eastern Ladakh, and a Consideration of Their Relationship to the History of Ladakh and Maryul", Ibid, BRILL, pp. 68–99, ISBN 9789004271807
- Petech, Luciano (1977), The Kingdom of Ladakh, c. 950–1842 A.D. (PDF), Instituto Italiano Per il Medio ed Estremo Oriente – via academia.edu
- Rahul, Ram (2000). March of Central Asia. Indus Publishing. ISBN 8173871094.
- Jina, Prem Singh (1 January 1995). Famous Western Expolorers to Ladakh. Indus Publishing. pp. 123–. ISBN 978-81-7387-031-6.
