= List of Scheduled Tribes in Maharashtra =

Tribals in Maharashtra

The Scheduled Tribes population in state of Maharashtra was 10,510,213 out of total population of 112,374,333 as of 2011 census. There are 45 communities and their sub-castes recognized as Scheduled Tribes in the state, accounting for 9.4% of state population.

== List ==
In accordance with The Scheduled Castes and Scheduled Tribes Orders (Amendment) Act, 1976.

1. Andh
2. Baiga
3. Barda
4. Bavacha, Bamcha
5. Bhaina
6. Bharia Bhumia, Bhuinhar Bhumia, Pando
7. Bhattra
8. Bhil, Bhil Garasia, DholiBhil, Dungri Bhil, Dungri Garasia, Mewasi Bhil, Rawal Bhil, Tadvi Bhil, Bhagalia, Bhilala, Pawra, Vasava, Vasave
9. Bhunjia
10. Binjhwar
11. Birhul, Birhor
12. Dhanka, Tadvi, Tetaria, Valvi
13. Dhanwar
14. Dhodia
15. Dubla, Talavia, Halpati
16. Gamit, Gamta, Gavit, Mavchi, Padvi
17. Gond, Rajgond, Arakh, Arrakh, Agaria, Asur, Badi Maria, Bada Maria, Bhatola, Bhimma, Bhuta, Koilabhuta, Koilabhuti, Bhar, Bisonhorn Maria, Chota Maria, Dandami Maria, Dhuru, Dhurwa, Dhoba, Dhulia, Dorla, Gaiki, Gatta, Gatti, Gaita, Gond, Gowari, Hill Maria, Kandra, Kalanga, Khatola, Koitar, Koya, Khirwar, Khirwara, Kucha Maria, Kuchaki Maria, Madia, Maria, Mana, Mannewar, Moghya, Mogia, Monghya, Mudia, Muria, Nagarchi, Naikpod, Nagwanshi, Ojha, Raj, Sonjhari Jhareka, Thatia, Thotya, Wade Maria, Vade Maria
18. Halba, Halbi
19. Kamar
20. Kathodi, Katkari, Dhor Kathodi, Dhor Kathkari, Son Kathodi, Son Katkari
21. Kawar, Kanwar, Kaur, Cherwa, Rathia, Tanwar, Chattri
22. Khairwar
23. Kharia
24. Kokna, Kokni, Kukna
25. Kol
26. Kolam, Mannervarlu
27. Koli Dhor, Tokre Koli, Kolcha, Kolgha
28. Koli Mahadev, Dongar Koli
29. Malhar Koli
30. Kondh, Khond, Kandh
31. Korku, Bopchi, Mouasi, Nihal, Nahul, Bondhi, Bondeya
32. Koya, Bhine Koya, Rajkoya
33. Nagesia, Nagasia
34. Naikda, Nayaka, Cholivala Nayaka, Kapadia Nayaka, Mota Nayaka, Nana Nayaka
35. Oraon, Dhangad
36. Pardhan, Pathari, Saroti
37. Pardhi: Advichincher, Phans Pardhi, Phanse Pardhi, Langoli Pardhi, Bahelia, Bahellia, Chita Pardhi, Shikari, Takankar, Takia
38. Parja
39. Patelia
40. Pomla
41. Rathawa
42. Sawar, Sawara
43. Thakur, Thakar, Ka Thakur, Ka Thakar, Ma Thakur, Ma Thakar
44. Varli
45. Vitolia, Kotwalia, Barodia

== Demographics ==
=== Tribe wise ===
S No	Tribe	Population (2011)	
S No	Tribe	Total	Percentage (of total)
01	Andh	4,74,110	4.511
02	Baiga	333	0.003
03	Barda	1,247	0.012
04	Bamcha, etc.	345	0.003
05	Bhaina	270	0.002
06	Bharia Bhumia, etc.	1,348	0.013
07	Bhattra	66	<0.001
08	Bhil, Bhil Garasia, Dongri Bhil, Bhagalia, Vasave, etc.	25,88,659	24.630
09	Bhunjia	2,139	0.020
10	Binjhwar	8,567	0.081
11	Birhor, etc.	145	0.001
12	Dhanka, etc.	35,104	0.334
13	Dhanwar	4,094	0.039
14	Dhodia	17,520	0.167
15	Halpati, etc.	18,697	0.178
16	Gamit, etc.	67,796	0.645
17	Gond, Rajgond, Arakh, Asur, Maria, etc.	16,18,090	15.395
18	Halba, etc.	2,61,011	2.483
19	Kamar	1,391	0.013
20	Kathodi, Katkari, etc.	2,85,334	2.715
21	Kawar, etc.	26,354	0.251
22	Khairwar	1,843	0.017
23	Kharia	745	0.007
24	Kokna, etc.	6,87,431	6.541
25	Kol	6,874	0.065
26	Kolam, etc.	1,94,671	1.852
27	Koli Dhor, etc.	2,20,074	2.094
28	Koli Mahadeo	14,59,565	13.887
29	Koli Malhar	2,82,868	2.691
30	Khond, etc.	515	0.005
31	Korku, etc.	2,64,492	2.516
32	Koya, etc.	388	0.003
33	Nagesia	133	0.001
34	Naikda, etc.	22,307	0.212
35	Oraon	43,060	0.410
36	Pardhan, etc.	1,45,131	1.381
37	Pardhi, etc.	2,23,527	2.127
38	Parja	315	0.003
39	Patelia	2,574	0.024
40	Pomla	44	<0.001
41	Rathawa	488	0.004
42	Sawar	348	0.003
43	Thakar, etc.	5,67,968	5.404
44	Varli	7,96,245	7.576
45	Vitolia	448	0.004
Generic tribes, etc.		1,75,539	1.670

=== District wise ===
District			Scheduled Tribes		
No	Name	Population (2011)	Population	Percent	Top 4 largest tribes (by population)
1	Ahmednagar	4,543,159	378,230	8.32	Bhil (157,771); Koli Mahadeo (128,562); Thakar (72,277); Pardhi (10,243)
2	Akola	1,813,906	100,280	5.53	Andh (23,233); Pardhi (21,383); Koli Mahadeo (18,681); Korku (11,684)
3	Amravati	2,888,445	404,128	13.99	Korku (240,784); Gond (100,052); Pardhi (26,331); Koli Mahadeo (12,306)
4	Aurangabad	3,701,282	143,366	3.87	Bhil (71,708); Koli Malhar (26,032); Koli Mahadeo (14,566); Thakar (12,125)
5	Beed	2,585,049	32,722	1.26	Koli Mahadeo (11,604); Bhil (9,898); Pardhi (5,556); Gond (1,611)
6	Bhandara	1,200,334	88,886	7.41	Gond (70,264); Halba (12,800); Binjhwar (1,782); Kol (755)
7	Buldhana	2,586,258	124,837	4.83	Bhil (34,763); Koli Mahadeo (25,130); Pardhi (22,170); Andh (19,512)
8	Chandrapur	2,204,307	389,441	17.67	Gond (307,597); Pardhan (48,327); Halba (13,522); Kolam (6,790)
9	Dhule	2,050,862	647,315	31.56	Bhil (438,899); Kokna (108,298); Koli Dhori (36,081); Gamit (24,438)
10	Gadchiroli	1,072,942	415,306	38.71	Gond (353,913); Pardhan (18,620); Halba (10,763); Kawar (7,621)
11	Gondia	1,322,507	214,253	16.20	Gond (136,791); Halba (56,462); Kawar (9,036); Binjhwar (5,438)
12	Hingoli	1,177,345	111,954	9.51	Andh (101,244); Koli Mahadeo (4,658); Pardhi (2,100); Thakar (821)
13	Jalgaon	4,229,917	604,367	14.29	Bhil (375,980); Koli Dhor (144,853); Koli Mahadeo (28,253); Pardhi (21,567)
14	Jalna	1,959,046	42,263	2.16	Bhil (12,563); Koli Malhar (9,656); Koli Mahadeo (8,219); Andh (3,286)
15	Kolhapur	3,876,001	30,206	0.78	Koli Mahadeo (19,117); Oraon (2,530); Pardhi (1,343); Bhil (977)
16	Latur	2,454,196	57,488	2.34	Koli Mahadeo (47,557); Gond (2,098); Thakar (1,073); Pardhi (865)
17	Mumbai City	3,085,411	25,093	0.81	Koli Mahadeo (8,757); Gond (2,429); Pardhi (2,334); Thakar (1,297)
18	Mumbai Suburban	9,356,962	104,560	1.12	Koli Mahadeo (22,143); Varli (10,841); Gond (7,275); Oraon (7,263)
19	Nagpur	4,653,570	437,571	9.40	Gond (265,527); Halba (134,189); Thakar (8,388); Kol (3,884)
20	Nanded	3,361,292	281,695	8.38	Andh (87,577); Koli Mahadeo (75,614); Kolam (57,910); Gond (32,119)
21	Nandurbar	1,648,295	1,141,933	69.28	Bhil (977,010); Kokna (45,890); Gamit (35,682); Koli Mahadeo (28,656)
22	Nashik	6,107,187	1,564,369	25.61	Koli Mahadeo (505,667); Korku (433,999); Bhil (429,898); Thakar (80,880)
23	Osmanabad	1,657,576	36,039	2.17	Koli Mahadeo (16,544); Pardhi (14,943); Thakar (1,372); Gond (950)
25	Parbhani	1,836,086	40,514	2.21	Andh (15,578); Koli Mahadeo (13,608); Pardhi (3,618); Kolam (2,137)
26	Pune	9,429,408	348,876	3.70	Koli Mahadeo (190,615); Thakar (75,397); Bhil (23,117); Pardhi (12,141)
27	Raigad	2,634,200	305,125	11.58	Kathodi (119,573); Thakar (90,822); Koli Mahadeo (74,445); Bhil (2,827)
28	Ratnagiri	1,615,069	20,374	1.26	Koli Mahadeo (9,475); Kathodi (6,921); Bhil (822); Kokna (639)
29	Sangli	2,822,143	18,333	0.65	Koli Mahadeo (8,802); Pardhi (2,741); Oraon (909); Konka (645)
30	Satara	3,003,741	29,635	0.99	Koli Mahadeo (15,506); Kathodi (3,646); Thakar (2,210); Pardhi (2,069)
31	Sindhudurg	849,651	6,967	0.82	Thakar (3,508); Koli Mahadeo (570); Kathodi (414); Kokna (334)
32	Solapur	4,317,756	77,592	1.80	Koli Mahadeo (51,919); Pardhi (14,316); Thakar (2,835); Bhil (2,110)
33	Thane	11,060,148	1,542,451	13.95	Varli (707,494); Koli Malhar (230,593); Thakar (173,331); Kathodi (124,507)
34	Wardha	1,300,774	149,507	11.49	Gond (112,424); Pardhan (10,134); Kolam (9,192); Halba (6,827)
35	Washim	1,197,160	80,471	6.72	Andh (63,577); Gond (3,965); Pardhi (3,746); Koli Mahadeo (3,689)
36	Yavatmal	2,772,348	514,057	18.54	Gond (172,599); Andh (148,724); Kolam (102,462); Pardhan (53,577)
		112,374,333	10,510,213	9.35%	
