= List of Scheduled Tribes in Gujarat =

Tribal List of Gujarat

The population of Gujarat in the 2011 Census of India was 60,439,692 out of which, 8,917,174 people belong to one of the Scheduled Tribes (STs), constituting 14.75 percent of the total population.

As of 2011, there are 29 coomunities recognized as Scheduled Tribes in the state. The state registered 21.4 percent growth in the Scheduled Tribe population between 1991 and 2001.

== Recognized Tribes ==
In accordance with The Scheduled Castes and Scheduled Tribes Orders (Amendment) Act, 2002.

1. Barda
2. Bavacha, Bamcha
3. Bharwad (in the Nesses of the forests of Alech, Barada and Gir)
4. Bhil, Bhil Garasia, Dholi Bhil, Dungri Bhil, Dungri Garasia, Mewasi Bhil, Rawal Bhil, Tadvi Bhil, Bhagalia, Bhilala, Pawra, Vasava, Vasave
5. Charan (in the Nesses of the forests of Alech, Barada and Gir)
6. Chaudhri (in Surat and Valsad districts)
7. Chodhara
8. Dhanka, Tadvi, Tetaria, Valvi
9. Dhodia
10. Dubla, Talavia, Halpati
11. Gamit, Gamta, Gavit, Mavchi, Padvi
12. Gond, Rajgond
13. Kathodi, Katkari, Dhor Kathodi, Dhor Katkari, Son Kathodi, Son Katkari
14. Kokna, Kokni, Kukna
15. Koli Dhor, Tokre Koli, Kolcha, Kolgha
16. Kunbi (in the Dangs district)
17. Naikda, Nayaka, Cholivala Nayaka, Kapadia Nayaka, Mota Nayaka, Nana Nayaka
18. Padhar
19. Pardhi, Advichincher, Phanse Pardhi (excluding Amreli, Bhavnagar, Jamnagar, Junagadh, Kutch, Rajkot and Surendranagar districts)
20. Patelia
21. Pomla
22. Rabari (in the Nesses of the forests of Alech, Barada and Gir). The area comprises Jamnagar and Junagadh districts.
23. Rathawa
24. Siddi (in Amreli, Bhavnagar, Jamnagar, Junagadh, Rajkot and Surendranagar districts)
25. Varli
26. Vitola, Kotwalia, Barodia
27. Bhil, Bhilala, Barela, Pateliya
28. Tadvi Bhil, Bavra, Vasave
29. Padvi

== Demographics ==
=== Population by Tribes ===
| Tribes | | Population | |
| No | Communities | Total (2011) | Percent of total |
|---|---|---|---|
| 001 | Barda | 748 | 0.008 |
| 002 | Bavacha, Bamcha | 2,889 | 0.032 |
| 003 | Bharwad | 1,672 | 0.019 |
| 004 | Bhil, Bhil Garasia, Dholi Bhil, Dungri Bhil, Dungri Garasia, Mewasi Bhil, Tadvi Bhil, Rawal Bhil, Bhagalia, Bhilala, Pawra, Vasave | 42,15,603 | 47.275 |
| 005 | Charan | 2,890 | 0.032 |
| 006 | Chaudhri | 3,02,958 | 3.397 |
| 007 | Choudhara | 7,579 | 0.085 |
| 008 | Dhanka, Tadvi, Tetaria, Valvi | 2,80,949 | 3.151 |
| 009 | Dhodia, Dhodhi | 6,35,695 | 7.129 |
| 010 | Dubla, Talavia, Halpati | 6,43,120 | 7.213 |
| 011 | Gamit, Gamta, Gavit, Mavchi, Padvi | 3,78,445 | 4.244 |
| 012 | Gond, Rajgond | 2,965 | 0.033 |
| 013 | Kathodi, Katkari, Dhor Kathodi, Dhor Katkari, Son Kathodi, Son Katkari | 13,632 | 0.153 |
| 014 | Kokna, Kokni, Kukna | 3,61,587 | 4.055 |
| 015 | Dhor Koli, Tokre Koli, Kolcha, Kolgha | 67,119 | 0.753 |
| 016 | Kunbi | 60,646 | 0.680 |
| 017 | Naikda, Nayaka, Cholivala Nayaka, Kapadia Nayaka, Mota Nayaka, Nana Nayaka | 4,59,908 | 5.157 |
| 018 | Padhar | 30,932 | 0.347 |
| 019 | Pardhi, Advichincher, Phase Pardhi | 3,450 | 0.039 |
| 020 | Patelia | 1,14,414 | 1.284 |
| 021 | Pomla | 687 | 0.007 |
| 022 | Rabari | 59,995 | 0.673 |
| 023 | Rathwa | 6,42,348 | 7.203 |
| 024 | Siddi, Siddi–Badshan | 8,661 | 0.097 |
| 025 | Varli | 3,28,194 | 3.681 |
| 026 | Vitola, Kotwalia, Barodia | 24,249 | 0.272 |
| 027 | Bhil, Bhilala, Patelia | 54,434 | 0.611 |
| 028 | Tadvi Bhil, Vasava, Bawra | 572 | 0.006 |
| 029 | Padvi | 136 | 0.001 |
| Generic tribes, etc. (those who identified them as Adivasi, Girijan, Vanvasi or Anusuchit Janjati) | | 2,10,697 | 2.363 |
| | | 89,17,174 | |

=== Population by district ===
| District | | Scheduled Tribes | | |
| Name | Population | Population | Percent | Top 3 largest (by population) |
|---|---|---|---|---|
| Katchh | 20,92,371 | 24,228 | 1.16 | Bhil (10,395); Naikda (3,692); Rathawa (1,527) |
| Banaskantha | 31,20,506 | 284,155 | 9.11 | Bhil (278,783); Padhar (156); Naikda (99) |
| Patan | 13,43,734 | 13,303 | 0.99 | Bhil (10,917); Bamcha (181); Naikda (49) |
| Mehsana | 20,35,064 | 9,392 | 0.46 | Bhil (5,696); Naikda (162); Pardhi (155) |
| Sabarkantha | 24,28,589 | 5,42,156 | 22.32 | Bhil (530,550); Naikda (3,993); Kathodi (1,061) |
| Gandhinagar | 13,91,753 | 18,204 | 1.31 | Bhil (10,765); Dhodia (685); Naikda (394) |
| Ahmedabad | 72,14,225 | 89,138 | 1.23 | Bhil (45,794); Padhar (12,232); Dhanka (2,198) |
| Surendranagar | 17,56,268 | 21,453 | 1.22 | Padhar (17,769); Bhil (1,981); Naikda (139) |
| Rajkot | 38,04,558 | 24,017 | 0.63 | Bhil (11,844); Koli Dhor (2,606); Patelia (899) |
| Jamnagar | 21,60,119 | 24,187 | 1.12 | Rabari (12,148); Bhil (4,934); Koli Dhor (1,515) |
| Porbandar | 5,85,449 | 13,039 | 2.23 | Rabari (9,942); Bhil (714); Charan (486) |
| Junagadh | 27,43,082 | 55,571 | 2.02 | Rabari (37,905); Siddi (6,572); Bhil (2,510) |
| Amreli | 15,14,190 | 7,322 | 0.48 | Bhil (3,690); Patelia (817); Koli Dhor (468) |
| Bhavnagar | 28,80,365 | 9,110 | 0.32 | Bhil (4,967); Patelia (245); Naikda (232) |
| Anand | 20,92,745 | 24,824 | 1.19 | Bhil (15,101); Bhil, Bhilala, etc. (957); Rathawa (767) |
| Kheda | 22,99,885 | 40,336 | 1.75 | Bhil (23,406); Naikda (3,944); Dhanka (3,380) |
| Panchmahal | 23,90,776 | 7,21,604 | 30.18 | Bhil (409,022); Naikda (152,542); Rathawa (107,578) |
| Dohad | 21,27,086 | 15,80,850 | 74.32 | Bhil (14,01,014); Patelia (93,219); Naikda (31,238) |
| Vadodara | 41,65,626 | 11,49,901 | 27.60 | Rathawa (511,074); Bhil (306,178); Dhanka (138,116) |
| Narmada | 5,90,297 | 4,81,392 | 81.55 | Bhil (359,698); Dhanka (101,120); Gavit (4,289) |
| Bharuch | 15,51,019 | 4,88,194 | 31.47 | Bhil (385,289); Halpati (61,622); Choudhara (6,842) |
| The Dangs | 2,28,291 | 2,16,073 | 94.65 | Kunbi (60,646); Bhil (56,844); Kokna (51,115) |
| Navsari | 13,29,672 | 6,39,659 | 48.11 | Dhodia (234,057); Halpati (169,618); Kokna (127,050) |
| Valsad | 17,05,678 | 9,02,794 | 52.93 | Dhodia (279,284); Varli (273,004); Kokna (145,268) |
| Surat | 60,81,322 | 8,56,952 | 14.09 | Halpati (268,743); Chaudhri (174,741); Bhil (196,707) |
| Tapi | 8,07,022 | 6,79,320 | 84.18 | Bhil (132,145); Chaudhri (123,413); Gavit (299,106) |
| | 6,04,39,692 | 89,17,174 | 14.75 | |

== Scheduled areas ==
Gujarat's scheduled areas:

1. Chhota Udaipur district
2. The Dangs district
3. Dahod district
4. Narmada district
5. Tapi district
6. Surat district (only talukas of Uchchhal, Vyara, Nizar, Songadh, Valod)
7. Bharuch district (only talukas of Dediapada, Sagbara, Valia, Nandod, Jhagadia)
8. Valsad district (only talukas of Vansda, Dharampur, Chikhali, Pardi, Kaprada, Umbergaon)
9. Vadodara district (only taluka of Naswadi)
10. Panchmahal district (only talukas of Jhalod, Santrampur, Limkheda, Deogarh Baria)
11. Sabarkantha district (only talukas of Khedbrahma, Bhiloda and Meghraj)
12. Navsari district (only taluka of Vansda and few parts of Gandevi)

The Scheduled Areas in the States of Bihar and Gujarat were originally specified by the Scheduled Areas (Part A States), Order, 1950 (Constitution Order, 9), dated 23.1.1950m, and have been re-specified as above by the Scheduled Areas (States of Bihar, Gujarat, Madhya Pradesh, and Orissa), Order, 1977 (Constitution Order, 109), dated 31.12.1977.
