= List of Scheduled Tribes in Rajasthan =

Tribal List of Rajasthan

The population of Rajasthan in 2011 Census of India was 68,548,437, of which 9,238,534 persons belong to one of the Scheduled Tribes (STs) constituting 13.48 per cent of the total population of the state. The state has registered 30.2 per cent decadal growth in the Scheduled Tribe population between 2001-2011.

== Main tribes ==
- Bhil are the oldest people of Rajasthan.
- The Mina is the largest tribe of the state in terms of population.

== List of communities ==
There are twelve (12) notified Scheduled Tribes in the state, which are as follows:

1. Bhil, Bhil Garasia, Dholi Bhil, Dungri Bhil, Dungri Garasia, Mewasi Bhil, Rawal Bhil, Tadvi Bhil, Bhagalia, Bhilala, Pawra, Vasava, Vasave
2. Bhil Mina
3. Damor, Damaria
4. Dhanka, Tadvi, Tetaria, Valvi
5. Garasia (excluding Rajput Garasia)
6. Kathodi, Katkari, Dhor Kathodi, Dhor Katkari, Son Kathodi, Son Katkari
7. Kokna, Kokni, Kukna
8. Koli Dhor, Tokre Koli, Kolcha, Kolgha
9. Mina
10. Naikda, Nayak, Cholivala Nayaka, Kapadia Nayaka, Mota Nayaka, Nana Nayaka
11. Patelia
12. Seharia, Sehria, Sahariya

=== Population ===
SR. No.	Scheduled Tribe	Total population	
SR. No.	Scheduled Tribe	2011	%age
1	Bhil, Bhil Garasia, Dholi Bhil, Dungri Bhil, Dungri Garasia, Mewasi Bhil, Rawal Bhil, Tadvi Bhil, Bhagalia, Bhilala, Pawra, Vasava, Vasave	41,00,264	44.38%
2	Bhil Mina	1,05,393	1.14%
3	Damor, Damaria	91,463	0.99%
4	Dhanka, Tadvi, Tetaria, Valvi	96,737	1.04%
5	Garasia (excluding Rajput Garasia)	3,14,194	3.41%
6	Kathodi, Katkari, Dhor Kathodi, Dhor Katkari, Son Kathodi, Son Katkari	4,833	0.05%
7	Kokni, Kokna, Kukna Tribe	361	<0.01%
8	Koli Dhor, Tokre Koli, Kolcha, Kolgha	1,535	0.16%
9	Mina	43,45,528	47.04%
10	Naikda, Nayaka, Cholivala Nayaka, Kapadia Nayaka, Mota Nayaka, Nana Nayaka	8,355	0.09%
11	Patelia	797	<0.01%
12	Seharia, Sehria, Sahariya	1,11,377	1.21%
Generic tribes, etc. (those who identified them as Janjati, Girijan, Adivasi)		57,697	0.62
		92,38,534	100%

=== Geography ===
Although tribals are found in the whole of Rajasthan, but the Aravalli mountainous region is called the shelter of the tribal communities in Rajasthan because the Aravalli mountainous region in Rajasthan is the physical region with the maximum forest wealth, wildlife, biodiversity. Only two tribes Sansi and Sahariya mostly do not reside in Aravalli.

=== District-wise population ===
Districts		ST Population (2011)		
Name	Population (2011)	Total population	Percentage	Largest three (by pop)
Ajmer	25,83,052	65,482	2.51%	Bhil (33,122); Mina (24,025); Garasia (4,933)
Alwar	36,74,179	2,89,249	7.67%	Mina (273,327); Dhanka (13,111); Bhil (663)
Banswara	17,97,485	13,72,999	76.41%	Bhil (1,339,679); Damar (20,637); Garasia (6,057)
Baran	12,22,755	2,76,857	22.61%	Mina (130,670); Seharia (108,520); Bhil (36,006)
Barmer	26,03,751	1,76,257	6.75%	Bhil (173,287); Mina (1,065); Bhil Mina (18)
Bharatpur	25,48,462	54,090	2.11%	Mina (52,958); Bhil (372); Dhanka (13)
Bhilwara	24,08,523	2,29,273	9.51%	Bhil (130,375); Mina (96,939); Garasia (127)
Bikaner	23,63,937	7,779	0.34%	Mina (2,984); Bhil (1,861); Naikda (1,806)
Bundi	11,10,906	2,28,549	20.55%	Mina (187,078); Bhil (39,452); Naikda (381)
Chittaurgarh	15,44,338	2,01,546	13.01%	Bhil (132,726); Mina (66,819); Garasia (436)
Churu	20,39,547	11,245	0.54%	Mina (9,374); Naikda (908); Dhanka (334)
Dausa	16,34,409	4,33,344	26.49%	Mina (430,945); Dhanka (561); Bhil (126)
Dhaulpur	12,06,516	58,594	4.81%	Mina (58,1333); Seharia (130); Bhil (28)
Dungarpur	13,88,552	9,83,437	71.25%	Bhil (686,981); Mina (156,360); Bhil Mina (78,396)
Ganganagar	19,69,168	13,477	0.66%	Dhanka (8,854); Mina (2,287); Bhil (807)
Hanumangarh	17,74,692	14,289	0.79%	Dhanka (10,069); Mina (2,582); Bhil (258)
Jaipur	66,26,178	5,27,966	7.97%	Mina (467,364); Dhanka (45,985); Bhil (3,954)
Jaisalmer	6,69,919	42,429	6.26%	Bhil (41,553); Mina (405); Koli Dhor (14)
Jalore	18,28,730	1,78,419	9.73%	Bhil (151,938); Mina (25,775); Garasia (92)
Jhalawar	14,11,129	1,82,229	12.89%	Bhil (105,153); Mina (75,310); Seharia (551)
Jhunjhunu	21,37,045	41,629	1.96%	Mina (38,625); Dhanka (2,075); Naikda (426)
Jodhpur	36,87,165	1,18,924	3.22%	Bhil (107,522); Mina (5,595); Dhanka (1,418)
Karauli	14,58,248	3,24,960	22.29%	Mina (323,342); Bhil (143); Bhil Mina (49)
Kota	19,51,014	1,83,816	9.43%	Mina (131,119); Bhil (48,274); Seharia (1,447)
Nagaur	33,07,743	10,418	0.3%	Mina (8,005); Bhil (393); Dhanka (322)
Pali	20,37,573	1,44,578	7.06%	Mina (61,606); Garasia (49,465); Bhil (32,350)
Pratapgarh	8,67,848	5,50,427	63.36%	Mina (447,023); Bhil (99,429); Bhil Mina (2,687)
Rajsamand	11,56,597	1,60,809	13.84%	Bhil (154,393); Mina (5,070); Bhil Mina (152)
Sawai Madhopur	13,35,551	2,85,848	21.42%	Mina (284,455); Bhil (222); Koli Dhor (60)
Sikar	26,77,333	75,349	2.8%	Mina (66,199); Dhanka (7,592); Naikda (321)
Sirohi	10,36,346	2,92,470	28.18%	Garasia (152,575); Bhil (112,793); Mina (26,225)
Tonk	14,21,326	1,78,207	12.52%	Mina (162,768); Bhil (13,991); Garasia (304)
Udaipur	30,68,420	15,25,289	49.71%	Mina (717,696); Bhil (652,005); Garasia (103,847)

== Scheduled areas ==
In Rajasthan 5697 villages come under Scheduled Area.
