= Tribals in Madhya Pradesh =

Major tribes of the state of Madhya Pradesh and their population

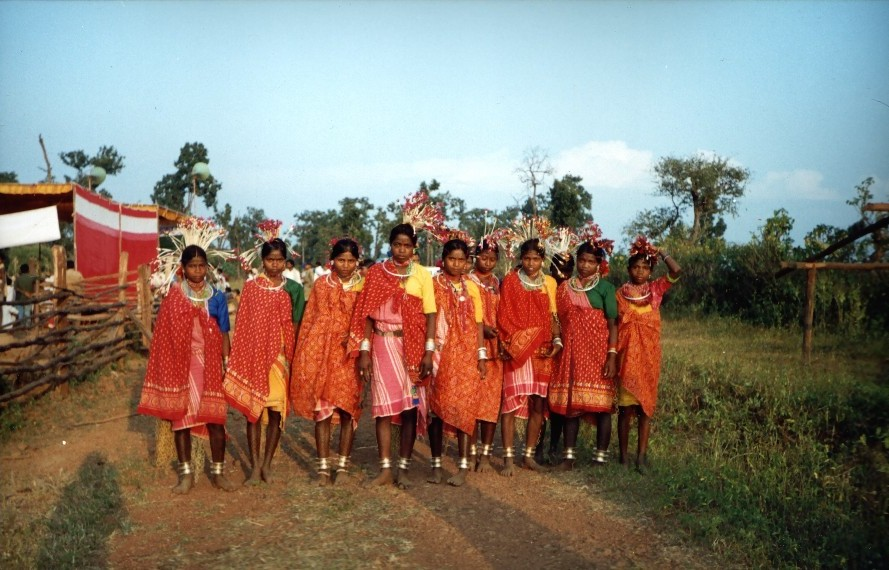
Bhil tribal girls in Jhabua

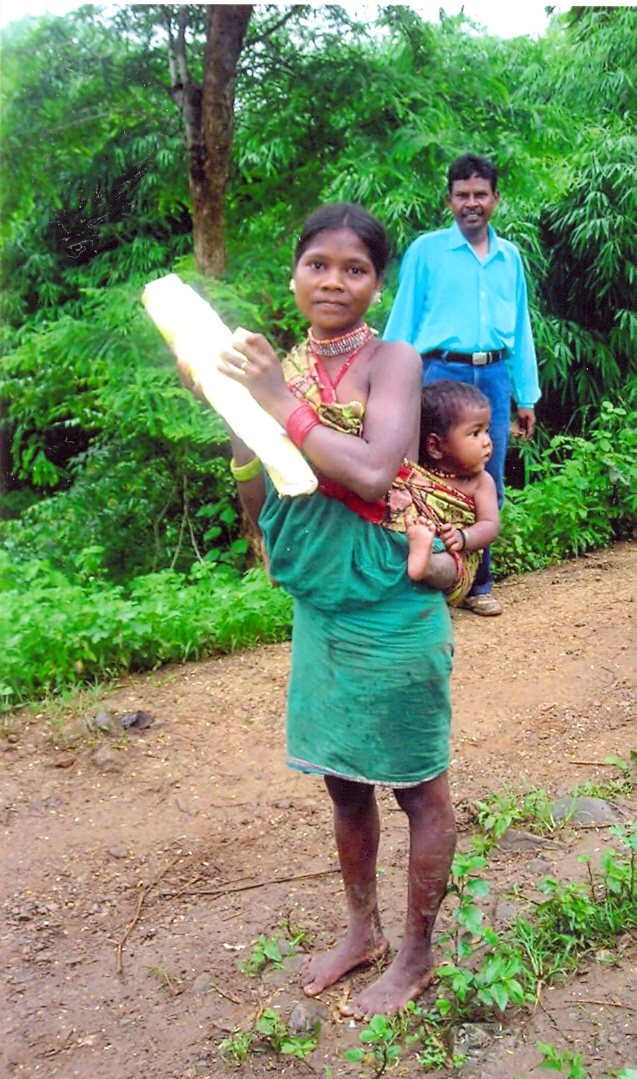
A Baiga tribe family in Balaghat district, Madhya Pradesh

There are 43 recognized Scheduled Tribes in Madhya Pradesh, India, three of which have been identified as "Particularly Vulnerable Tribal Groups" or "PTGs" (formerly known as "Special Primitive Tribal Groups"). The population of Scheduled Tribals (ST) is 21.1 per cent of the state population (15.31 million out of 72.62 million), according to the 2011 census. Bounded by the Narmada River to the north and the Godavari River to the southeast, tribal peoples occupy the slopes of the region's mountains.

The term Scheduled Tribes refers to specific indigenous peoples whose status is acknowledged to by the Constitution of India. The term Adivasi also applies to indigenous peoples of this area.

== Diversity ==
The diversity in the tribes across the state comes from differences in heredity, lifestyle, cultural traditions, social structure, economic structure, religious beliefs and language and speech. Due to the different linguistic, cultural and geographical environments, the diverse tribal world of Madhya Pradesh has been largely cut off from the mainstream of development.

Madhya Pradesh holds first rank among all the States or Union Territories (UTs) in terms of Special Tribal population and twelfth rank in respect of the proportion of ST population to total population.

Bhils have the highest population in Jhabua district followed by Dhar, Barwani and Khargone districts.

Gonds have major concentrations in Dindori district, Chhindwara, Mandla, Betul, Seoni and Shahdol district. Other four major groups Kol, Korku, Sahariya and Baiga have registered the highest population in Rewa, Khandwa, Shivpuri and Shahdol districts respectively.

== List of recognised tribes ==
1. Agariya
2. Andh
3. Baiga
4. Bhaina
5. Bharia Bhumia, Bhuinhar Bhumia, Bhumiya, Bharia, Paliha, Pando
6. Bhattra
7. Bhil, Bhilala, Barela, Patelia
8. Bhil Meena
9. Bhunjia
10. Biar, Biyar
11. Binjhwar
12. Birhul, Birhor
13. Damor, Damaria
14. Dhanwar
15. Gadaba, Gadba
16. Gond; Arakh, Arrakh, Agaria, Asur, Badi Maria, Bada Maria, Bhatola, Bhimma, Bhuta, Koilabhuta, Koliabhuti, Bhar, Bisonhorn Maria, Chota Maria, Dandami Maria, Dhuru, Dhurwa, Dhoba, Dhulia, Dorla, Gaiki, Gatta, Gatti, Gaita, Gond Gowari, Hill Maria, Kandra, Kalanga, Khatola, Koitar, Koya, Khirwar, Khirwara, Kucha Maria, Kuchaki Maria, Madia, Maria, Mana, Mannewar, Moghya, Mogia, Monghya, Mudia, Muria, Nagarchi, Nagwanshi, Ojha, Raj, Sonjhari Jhareka, Thatia, Thotya, Wade Maria, Vade Maria, Daroi
17. Halba, Halbi
18. Kamar
19. Karku
20. Kawar, Kanwar, Kaur, Cherwa, Rathia, Tanwar, Chattri
21. Khairwar, Kondar
22. Kharia
23. Kondh, Khond, Kandh
24. Kol
25. Kolam
26. Korku, Bopchi, Mouasi, Nihal, Nahul, Bondhi, Bondeya
27. Korwa, Kodaku
28. Majhi
29. Majhwar
30. Mawasi
31. Munda
32. Nagesia, Nagasia
33. Oraon, Dhanka, Dhangad
34. Panika (in Chhatarpur, Datia, Panna, Rewa, Satna, Shahdol, Sidhi and Tikamgarh districts)
35. Pao
36. Pardhan, Pathari Saroti
37. Pardhi, Bahelia, Bahellia, Chita Pardhi, Langoli Pardhi, Phans Pardhi, Shikari, Takankar, Takia (in the districts of Chhatarpur, Datia, Panna, Rewa, Satna, Shahdol, Sidhi and Tikamgarh; tahsils of Betul district, Patan tahsil and Sihora and Majholi blocks of Jabalpur district, Katni (Murwara) and Vijaya Raghogarh tahsils and Bahoriband and Dhemerkheda blocks of Katni district, Hoshangabad, Babai, Sohagpur, Pipariya and Bankhedi tahsils and Kesla block of Hoshangabad district, Narsinghpur district, and Harsud tahsil of Khandwa district)
38. Parja
39. Sahariya, Saharia, Seharia, Sehria, Sosia, Sor
40. Saonta, Saunta
41. Saur
42. Sawar, Sawara
43. Sonr

== Demographics ==
Scheduled Tribes		Population	
Code	Tribes	Total (2011)	%age of total
501	Agariya	41,243	0.267
502	Andh	137	<0.01
503	Baiga	4,14,526	2.69
504	Bhaina	6,357	0.04
505	Bharia Bhumia, etc.	1,93,230	1.25
506	Bhattra	1,155	0.009
507	Bhil, Bhilala, Barela, Pateliya	59,93,921	38.88
508	Bhil Meena	2,244	0.015
509	Bhunjia	1,469	0.009
510	Biar, Biyar	10,452	0.068
511	Binjhwar	15,805	0.11
512	Birhul, Birhor	52	<0.01
513	Damor, Damaria	1,815	0.012
514	Dhanwar	2,715	0.017
515	Gadaba, Gadba	578	<0.01
516	Gond, etc.	50,93,124	33.04
517	Halba, Halbi	14,438	0.093
518	Kamar	666	<0.01
519	Karku	265	<0.01
520	Kawar, Kanwar, etc.	18,603	0.12
521	Khairwar, Korwar	76,097	0.49
522	Kharia	2,429	0.014
523	Khond, Khond, Khand	109	<0.01
524	Kol	11,67,694	7.57
525	Kolam	224	<0.01
526	Korku, etc.	7,30,847	4.74
527	Korwa, Kodaku	920	<0.01
528	Majhi	50,655	0.33
529	Majhwar	443	<0.01
530	Mawasi	1,09,180	0.71
531	Munda	5,041	0.03
532	Nagesia, Nagasia	359	<0.01
533	Oraon, Dhanka, Dhangad	28,431	0.18
534	Panika	97,767	0.63
535	Pao	44,312	0.29
536	Pardhan, Paroti, Satauri	1,23,742	0.81
537	Pardhi, Bahelia, etc.	5,896	0.038
538	Parja	137	<0.01
539	Saharia, etc.	6,14,958	4.02
540	Saonta, Saunta	190	<0.01
541	Suar	1,67,340	1.09
542	Sawar, Sawara	881	<0.01
543	Sonr	12,905	0.08
GENERIC TRIBES (those members who have listed them as "Adivasi", "Giri-Jan", or "Anusuchit Janjati")		2,52,977	1.64
		1,53,16,784	100%

=== District wise ===
District		Scheduled Tribes		
Name	Population (2011)	Population	Percent	Top 3 (largest tribes)
Bhopal	2,371,061	68,429	2.89	Gond (31,612); Bhil (13,119); Saharia (5,041)
Raisen	1,331,597	205,006	15.39	Gond (156,103); Bhil (21,789); Saharia (7,499)
Rajgarh	1,545,814	53,751	3.48	Bhil (43,951); Gond (5,865); Saharia (2,266)
Sehore	1,311,332	145,512	11.10	Bhil (67,364); Gond (46,819); Korku (26,911)
Vidisha	1,458,875	67,603	4.63	Saharia (42,854); Gond (10,435); Bhil (7,835)
Morena	1,965,970	17,030	0.87	Saharia (10,150); Majhi (3,208); Gond (1,614)
Bhind	1,703,005	6,131	0.36	Majhi (3,374); Korku (769); Gond (662)
Sheopur	687,861	161,448	23.47	Saharia (144,600); Bhil (8,848); Majhi (1,919)
Gwalior	2,032,036	72,133	3.55	Saharia (45,637); Majhi (11,142); Gond (4,303)
Ashoknagar	845,071	82,072	9.71	Saharia (75,547); Gond (695); Bhil (448)
Datia	786,754	15,061	1.91	Saharia (9,289); Majhi (2,577); Gond (1,198)
Guna	1,241,519	190,819	15.37	Bhil (116,239); Saharia (65,352); Gond (2,953)
Shivpuri	1,726,050	227,802	13.20	Saharia (191,243); Bhil (10,042); Gond (2,131)
Indore	3,276,697	217,679	6.64	Bhil (195,663); Gond (6,173); Korku (2,415)
Alirajpur	728,999	648,638	88.98	Bhil (647,653); Gond (66); Korku (20)
Barwani	1,385,881	962,145	69.42	Bhil (952,940); Korku (4,541); Oraon (1,778)
Burhanpur	757,847	230,095	30.36	Bhil (142,179); Korku (79,402); Gond (5,426)
Dhar	2,185,793	1,222,814	55.94	Bhil (1,200,502); Gond (2,678); Majhi (1,049)
Jhabua	1,025,048	891,818	87.01	Bhil (889,582); Damor (492); Gond (447)
Khandwa	1,310,061	459,122	35.04	Bhil (230,857); Korku (184,499); Gond (34,987)
Khargone	1,873,046	730,169	38.98	Bhil (713,640); Korku (3,219); Gond (1,744)
Jabalpur	2,463,289	375,231	15.23	Gond (237,561); Kol (82,017) Bharia (23,875)
Balaghat	1,701,698	383,026	22.51	Gond (319,043); Baiga (25,226); Binjhwar (15,067)
Chhindwara	2,090,922	769,778	36.81	Gond (619,809); Mawasi (88,216); Bharia (31,847)
Dindori	704,524	455,789	64.69	Gond (349,992); Baiga (42,109); Kol (33,175)
Katni	1,292,042	317,699	24.59	Kol (131,949); Gond (107,623); Bharia (64,363)
Mandla	1,054,905	610,528	57.87	Gond (529,157); Baiga (43,331); Pardhan (18,818)
Narsinghpur	1,091,854	145,879	13.36	Gond (130,431); Bharia (5,713); Oraon (3,581)
Seoni	1,379,131	519,856	37.96	Gond (464,849); Pardhan (35,704); Bharia (3,170)
Narmadapuram	1,241,350	197,300	15.89	Gond (132,846); Korku (42,117); Mawasi (5,823)
Betul	1,575,362	667,018	42.34	Gond (470,744); Korku (185,000); Pardhan (6,803)
Harda	570,465	159,678	27.99	Korku (105,332); Gond (38,863); Bhil (8,752)
Rewa	2,365,106	311,985	13.19	Kol (264,276); Gond (19,765); Majhi (4,488)
Satna	3,084,963	319,975	10.37	Kol (219,114); Gond (65,919); Mawasi (14,035)
Sidhi	1,127,033	313,304	27.80	Kol (132,126); Gond (127,696); Baiga (26,392)
Singrauli	1,178,273	383,994	32.59	Gond (193,050); Kol (61,184); Baiga (45,142)
Sagar	2,378,458	221,936	9.33	Gond (126,195); Saur (71,454); Saharia (6,199)
Chhatarpur	1,762,375	73,597	4.18	Saur (24,523); Gond (13,831); Sonr (2,719)
Damoh	1,264,219	166,295	13.15	Gond (142,079); Saur (9,135); Bhil (4,040)
Panna	1,016,520	170,879	16.81	Gond (100,096); Bharia (38,465); Khairwar (15,745)
Tikamgarh	1,445,166	67,857	4.69	Saur (53,921); Gond (2,928); Sonr (2,471)
Shahdol	1,066,063	476,008	44.65	Gond (185,916); Kol (105,046); Baiga (99,299)
Anuppur	749,237	358,543	47.85	Gond (219,919); Kol (38,889); Baiga (30,211)
Umaria	644,758	300,687	46.63	Gond (118,920); Baiga (87,177); Kol (73,661)
Ujjain	1,986,864	48,730	2.45	Bhil (35,117); Gond (8,298); Majhi (1,631)
Dewas	1,563,715	272,701	17.44	Bhil (136,289); Korku (86,818); Gond (45,030)
Mandsaur	1,340,411	33,092	2.47	Bhil (31,350); Gond (563); Bhil Mina (282)
Neemuch	826,067	71,441	8.65	Bhil (68,929); Gond (1,145); Bhil Mina (547)
Ratlam	1,455,069	409,865	28.17	Bhil (401,922); Gond (2,537); Bhil Mina (208)
Shajapur	1,512,678	37,836	2.50	Bhil (35,948); Gond (454); Majhi (414)
