= India tribal belt =

Living the Tribal communities in Indian states

Percent of scheduled tribes in India by tehsils by census 2011

India's tribal belt refers to contiguous areas of settlement of tribal people of India, that is, groups or tribes that remained genetically homogenous as opposed to other population groups that mixed widely within the Indian subcontinent. The tribal population in India, although a small minority, represents an enormous diversity of groups. They vary in language and linguistic traits, ecological settings in which they live, physical features, size of the population, the extent of acculturation, dominant modes of making a livelihood, level of development and social stratification. They are also spread over the length and breadth of the country though their geographical distribution is far from uniform. A majority of the Scheduled Tribe population is concentrated in the eastern, central and western belt covering the nine States of Odisha, Madhya Pradesh, Chhattisgarh, Jharkhand, Maharashtra, Gujarat, Rajasthan, Andhra Pradesh and West Bengal. About 12 percent inhabit the North-eastern region, about five percent in the Southern region and about three percent in the Northern States.

== Notable belts ==
=== Central India belt ===
The largest population of Schedule tribes in India resides in the Central India tribal belt stretching from Madhya Pradesh to West Bengal, including regions of Chhattisgarh, Uttar Pradesh, Jharkhand and Odisha. The regions falling in this belt has been historically isoluted due to dense forests and mineral rich plateaus, which were later subjugated under the British Raj leading to outside settlement in this region and is called as Central Tribal belt.

The major tribes in this region are Santal, Gond, Munda, Kurukh, Munda, Ho, Baiga, Kharia, Korku, Banjara, and small number of Bhil. Majority of tribes in the region have their own language and clan system, with very less marital relations or alliances with each as they are isolated with others and resides in different areas in the region. Among them, the Santals are the most populated tribal group in the region.

=== North Eastern tribal belt ===
The Northeast India has the highest proportion of tribals in India with Mizoram, having 94% tribal population and lowest being Assam, with around 12.4% of total population being tribals. The tribals inhabiting the region are majorly part of Sino-Tibetan and Sino-Austronesian speakers similar to neighbouring countries of Bhutan, China and Myanmar. The tribals in the region were culturally and geographically isolated from the mainland India, due to hilly geography and thus lead to their grouping as Hill tribes of Northeast India.

Major tribal communities in the region include the Bodo–Kacharis, Khasi, Garo, Naga, Mishing, Karbi, Mizo, Kuki, Tripuri, Adi, Chakma, among others. In Arunachal Pradesh, the Puyong have been described as an indigenous community associated with the wider Tani cultural sphere. Their traditional livelihoods include jhum cultivation, hunting and forest-based activities. The community follows the Donyi-Polo faith and maintains customary practices, oral traditions and knowledge of the local environment. The region's mountainous and forested geography contributed to the development of numerous languages, dialects and distinct social groups. Several tribal communities form a majority within particular states or districts, and some areas have been organised as autonomous administrative divisions.

=== Western tribal belt ===
The tribal belt of West India stretches from Aravalli Range to the upper northern west of Maharashtra, including regions of Gujarat and Madhya Pradesh. The dense forested region of quadripod of the four states; Gujarat, Madhya Pradesh, Maharashtra and Rajasthan, shaped due to interaction of basins of Mahi, Sabarmati, Tapi and Luni.

The single largest tribal group in the region is Bhil, which is also the biggest tribal group in India. The other major tribes includes Bhil Meena, Bhilala, Vasave, Tadvi, Damor, Kathodi, Patelia, Halpati, Andh, Kokna,Garasia, Warli and others. Majority of the tribes in the region are large part of Bhil tribes are distinguished due to their language, which are of Indo-Aryan language group.

=== Dandakaranya region ===
The mineral rich region of Dandakaranya, which stretches from Bastar division in Chhattisgarh to Telangana which is part of greater Bastar plateau region has a high proportion of tribal, due to the region being isolated despite being part of major kingdoms throughout the history. It comprises parts of Andhra Pradesh, Chhattisgarh, Maharashtra, Odisha and Telangana.

The single largest tribal group of the plateau region is Gond, along with their sungroups speaking common Gondi and its dialects which is part of Dravidian language family. The other prominent tribes in the plateaus are Khond, Muria, Maria, Koya, Halba and others.

=== Trans-Himalayan belt ===
The vast ranges of Himalayas and the rivers flowing from it have created many trans river badin the Himalayan region, which have been home to many tribal communities. Due to heavy mountain ranges, these regions have remained geographically isolated from outside world creating a unique cultural distinctions between people residing in the areas. The regions are Jaunsar-Bawar, Zanskar Range and Kinnaur and Spiti Valley. Though tribal population is also present in residential and regions that were connected to mainland plains, where those people were hunters, nomads or cave dwellers.

The tribes of these regions are Gurjars, Ladakhis, Gaddis, Bhotiya, Jaunsari and Hatti. Majority of them resides in the specified region, though Rajis and Bhotiyas of Uttarakhand have been distributed in the main regions also.

=== South Indian tribal belt ===
There are few minor tribals regions in the South India states due to little or no interactions with outside world due to geographical isolation, though due to small population they are not considered as major belt.

== See also ==
- Adivasi ("Scheduled tribes")
- List of Scheduled Tribes in India

== Sources ==
This article incorporates text from a free content work. Licensed under CC BY-SA 3.0 (license statement/permission). Text taken from Situational Analysis of Ashram Schools in Maharashtra: In the Context of Child Protection, Vidhayak Bharti : A Child Rights Advocacy Initiative.
