= Indian tribes =

Indian tribes may refer to:

- Tribe (Native American), United States
- Adivasi, the indigenous tribal people of India
  - India tribal belt, regions of India inhabited by indigenous people
