= Tribal belt =

Tribal belt may refer to:

- India tribal belt
- Pakistan tribal belt
- Tribal belt of Afghanistan
