= Bhagoria Festival =

Indian harvest festival

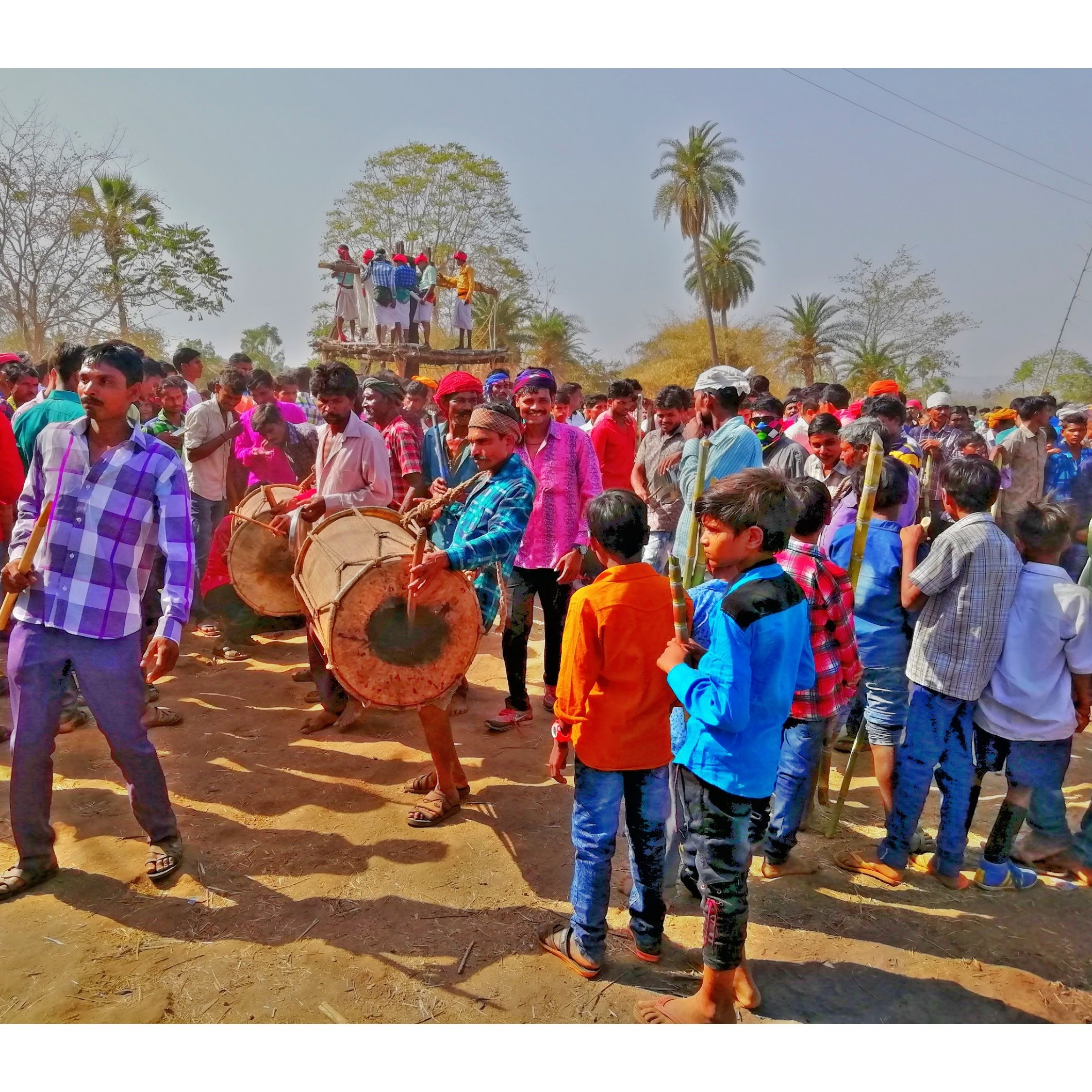
Bhagoria Festival

The Bhagoria or Bhangoria Festival is an Indian harvest festival. It is celebrated by the tribal people of the Indian states of Madhya Pradesh (specifically of Malwa and Nimad region) and Maharashtra . Tribes who participate include the Bhil, Bhilala, Patelia, Rathwa and Barela etc.

The festival takes place in the Barwani, Dhar, Alirajpur, Khargone and Jhabua districts of Madhya Pradesh and Nandurbar district and parts of Dhule districts of Maharashtra. Along with these places it also spreads its enthusiastic fragrance in the Dahod district of Gujarat and Banswad district of Rajasthan with a slightly different thematic change in its name such as Galaliyu Haat. I has agricultural significance and coincides with the end of harvesting of crops. It is celebrated for seven days in the month of March before the Holi Festival. Traditionally, celebrants travel to the festival grounds with their families on decorated bullock carts. There, they purchase the things required to celebrate Holi, dance to traditional musical instruments, sing songs called "Lokgeet" and meet the people of the region.
