= Nirdhi Bhil =

- Religions: Islam & Christianity
- Languages: Marathi and Bhili
- Populated states: Maharashtra
- Subdivisions: None

Nirdhi Bhil or sometimes pronounced as Nilde Bhil are a Muslim community found in India.

Some Bhil, it is said to have occurred during the rule of the Faruki kings. Satmalas hills formed part of the territory the Faruqi kingdom, a medieval state in central India. A close association had developed between the Bhil of this region, and the Faruqi state led to the conversion of many of them to Islam.
