= Barela =

Barela Dharmnagri
- Town
- Location in Madhya Pradesh, India Barela (India)
- Coordinates: 23.1°N 80.05°E
- Country: India
- State: Madhya Pradesh
- District: Jabalpur
- Elevation: 405 m (1,329 ft)

Population (2001)
  - Total: 10,874

Languages
  - Official: Hindi
- Time zone: UTC+5:30 (IST)
- ISO 3166 code: IN-MP
- Vehicle registration: MP

Barela is a town and nagar parishad in Jabalpur district in the state of Madhya Pradesh, India. Its other name is Dharmnagri.

== Geography ==
Barela is located at 23.1°N 80.05°E. It has an average elevation of 405 metres (1,329 ft).

== Demographics ==
As of 2001 India census, Barela had a population of 10,874. Males constitute 53% of the population and females 47%. Barela has an average literacy rate of 70%, higher than the national average of 59.5%; with 59% of the males and 41% of females literate. 14% of the population is under 6 years of age.
