= Garasia =

Title used by Koli chieftains in India

Garasiya alternatively spelled Garasiya, Garasiya or Garasiya, is a title used by tribal chieftains and members of other arms-bearing lineages in India who held the villages as Giras granted by rulers.

== Social order ==
Present-day Garasias are characterised by several social divisions with well-defined relationships. These divisions have appeared out of situations of culture contact and acculturation. Today Garasias are divided into Koli Garasia, Rajput Garasia, Dungri Garasia and Bhil Garasia. The Koli Garasiya were tributary to the ruler of state who gave them Giras.

== See also ==
- Molesalam Rajput, a Muslim community
