= Bhilala =

The Bhilala are an indigenous tribal community primarily found in the Malwa and Nimar regions of the Central Provinces and Central India. Their total population is estimated to be around 150,000, with the majority residing in the Bhopawar Agency, adjacent to Nimar. As per the 1911 census, only about 15,000 Bhilalas were recorded in the Central Provinces.

They are counted together with Bhils and are recognized as Scheduled Tribes in Gujarat, Madhya Pradesh and Rajasthan.

== Origin ==
The tradition of the tribe says that, after the Ghurid invasion, around 200,000 Chauhans fled to Mewar, and after Alauddin Khalji's invasion, many fled to the Vindhya hills and took Bhil women in marriage. Those male Chauhans and Bhadoriyas "lost their caste" and were called Bhilalas. The Chauhan Bhilalas gained importance during the Pindari raids in Central India by enlisting under the Holkar rulers.

== History ==
Bhilalas are widely regarded and with considerable historical support deacribed as a mixed ethnic group, descended from immigrant Rajputs and the indigenous Bhil population of Central India. The term "Bhilala" is believed to have evolved from "Bhilwala," possibly referring to Rajput chiefs who conquered small estates in Bhil territories or those who married the daughters of Bhil chieftains. In the Central Provinces, Bhilalas are typically descendants of Rajput men and Bhil women, and they often adopt the clan name of their Rajput ancestry. Traditionally, Bhilalas have been landholders and live in the manner of local elites, such as mukhis, darbārs, or thākurs.

Systematic anthropological research into the Bhilala community began in the 1960s, focusing on subgroups such as the Rathwa Bhilala and Barela Bhilala. However, references to the Bhilalas date back as early as 1832, when John Malcolm first used the term to describe individuals of Bhil and Rajput descent–a classification that has endured. In contrast, Michael Kennedy, a colonial administrator in 1908, proposed a more specific categorization, identifying subgroups like Baria, Dangi, Parmar, Rathwa, and Rathod.

The origins of the Bhilala community likely trace back to the medieval period, during which Rajputs fleeing the Muslim invasions of northern India migrated southward. As they established dominance over Bhil settlements, intermarriage with Bhil women gave rise to the Bhilala lineage.

=== Bhilala Dynasty ===
Several Bhilala families continue to hold estates in the Nimar and Indore regions, with their chiefs now paradoxically claiming to be of "pure" Rajput descent, despite lacking any historical or genealogical evidence to support this. Prominent Bhilala houses, such as those of Bhamgarh, Selani, and Mandhata, do not intermarry with the broader Bhilala community. Instead, they maintain marital alliances exclusively among themselves and with other families of similar status in Malwa and Holkar's Nimar.

Upon succession to the throne, or headship of the family, the new representative is traditionally marked with a tilaka as a symbolic badge applied to the forehead, or may also be presented with a ceremonial sword. This investiture is sometimes performed by the head of another noble house, in accordance with customary practices. Bhilala landholders typically bear aristocratic titles such as Rao or Rawat.

Though members of these elite Bhilala families often deny the possibility that of Bhilala being originated from an intermarriage between a Rajput and a Bhil, such as Bhilala Rao of Mandhata, who holds the hereditary position of custodian of the revered Shiva shrine at Omkareshwar (Onkar Mandhata), situated on an island in the Narmada River.

According to family mythology, their ancestor Bharat Singh, a Chauhan Rajput is said to have conquered Mandhata from Nathu Bhil in A.D. 1165. He is credited with restoring the worship of Lord Shiva on the island, which, according to legend, had been rendered inaccessible to pilgrims by the fearsome deities Kali and Bhairava, known as devourers of human flesh.

== States ==
1. Bharudpura, Bhumia Raja Thakur Udai Singh – The chiefs claimed to be Chauhan Rajputs of the Anjana section and belonged to a Bhilala family. Born around 1848; succeeded to the gadi in 1858. The population of the state was 1,724, mainly Hindus. Area of the state was 57 km^{2} and revenue was Rs 6000/-. Residence. Bharudpura, Bhopawar, Central India.

2. Chhota Barkhera, Bhumia Raja Thakur Mugat Singh – Born in 1865; succeeded to the gadi on 14 September 1889. He was descended from a Bhilala family and was claimed to be a Chauhan Rajput. The population of the state was about 1,259, mainly Hindus. Area of the state was 60 km^{2} and revenue was Rs 5000/- Residence. Chhota Barkhera, Bhopawar, Central India.
