= Gamit people =

Indigenous people of Gujarat, India

The Gamit are Adivasi, or indigenous Bhil people of Gujarat, India. They are mainly found in Tapi, Surat, Dang, Bharuch, Valsad and Navsari districts of Gujarat and some parts of Maharashtra. They are an indigenous people and are included in state list of scheduled tribes.

== Geographic distribution ==
Gamits are found in the districts of Surat, Bharuch, Valsad and Dangs. In Surat district, they are found in Vyara, Songadh, Uchchal and Nizar talukas. They are known as Gamits or Mavachi. Their sub-tribes are Padvi, Valvi and Vasava. Gamits are believed to be sub-tribe of Bhils. Those Bhils who got settled in a village were known as Gamits. As per the 2001 census, the total population of Gamits was 3,54,362. Of this, 1,76,780 are male and 1,77,582 are female. The percentage of Gamits among total tribal population is 4.74 per cent.

== Habitations and furnishings ==
Gamits are settled in villages. Their houses are not in a straight line like city chawls. Though they stay in vicinity of each other, they are independently situated. All houses have open space around four walls. Sometimes the houses are built on small hills; and some houses are built at the feet of hills. The building material is clay, cow dung, and paddy grass. Bamboos are used in construction of walls. The roofs are constructed suitable to geographical conditions. Either indigenous or Manglory tiles are used to cover roofs. In modern times, some houses have RCC roofs. Gamits stay in houses owned by them. In their houses, they keep the utensils made from copper, brass, aluminum, steel, clay or glass. Besides, they have some mattresses, cots, kerosene lamp, and wooden stand, drum to store food-grain, a radio, T.V., tape recorder, tin box, steel cupboard, etc.

== Musical Instruments ==
Their musical instruments are made from leather, metal strings, shankh, Dhan, a pipe, Noly, Pawari, Dobru, Ghonghali, etc.

== Dress ==
The older generation maintains traditional dress. The children, however, have adopted bush-shirt and half-pant, whereas youth wear shirts and pants. Girls prefer either old-fashioned frocks or modern Punjabi dresses. Men wear pant-shirts and women wear either a Punjabi dress or saree, a blouse and a petty-coat/chaniya. Older people invariably wear a cap. Older women wear sarees in Maharashtra-style, separating both legs from each other with a saree tied down at the back.

== Ornaments ==
Gamit women are fond of ornaments. They have a kanthi (a round, solid necklace) or a chain (achhodo) in their neck. They have a donto on the nose, ear-rings in their ears, bangles on their hands, a kanku or bracelet on their arms, kadla, a plain, round ornament gripped on the legs or ankla (zanzar) with many small silver bells. Males wear a silver (waist-band) around the waist, rings on their fingers, and dolo on their toes. Additionally, several other ornaments are also used.

== Dialect ==
Gamits speak Gamit language. Their communication is only in Gamit dialect. They are known as 'Gamits of 52 families' and they do not have a fixed formation of speech.

== Food and drink ==
They consume food grains of nagli, jowar, rice, maize (for preparing loaf), urad and tuver for pulse-dal and potatoes and onions as vegetables in addition to seasonal vegetables. They also consume chapati and pulses. Usually they consume meat and fish as well as wine and tadi. Some have joined Hindu Bhakti school of religious thought rejecting their unique non-vegetarian tradition.

== Education ==
As per the 2001 census, the literacy level among Gamit is 52.91%. Gamits reside in both villages and cities; and therefore they could make use of various Government policies including reservation in education.

== Religion ==
Gamits have now become Hindus (~89%) and Christian ( ~11% ). Hindus believe in Hindu Gods and Goddesses. They also believe in their own traditional tribal Gods and Goddesses, for example, Devli Madi, Gaumukh, Dunger Dev, Gowal Dev, and Anaj Dev. They keep vows for some purposes and make occasional pilgrimages. They celebrate the festivals of Gam dev no, Holi, Gowal Dev festival, Vaghdev Mahadev, Dussera, Diwali, and Nano Dev-Moto Dev. Besides those, Gamits have Mahadev, Dussera, Diwali, Nano Dev-Moto Dev, etc. Besides those Gamits, who have now become Christians celebrate Christmas with great joy.

== Occupation ==
Gamits are usually agriculturists. Some people whose land has been seized work as agricultural laborers or other laborers. Educated Gamits seek employment. Some go for animal husbandry and many others work in factories.

== Caste panch ==
In the Gamit community, there is formal or informal caste panch for controls and regulations in their social dealings. Gamits assemble and constitute the caste panch for community members to follow rules and regulations. Gamits also have their own written constitution. The caste panch looks after the cases of marriages, remarriages, divorce, education, etc.

== The cycle of life ==
The life cycle of the Gamit community covers three main phases of life: Birth, marriage and death.

=== Birth of a child ===
There is no custom that the first delivery of the Gamit girl should be at the parents' home. Better facilities and a better place are prioritised. The Dai comes home for five days to give a bath to the new born child. On the fifth day of the birth of a child a 'Pancharo' or on sixth day 'a chhathi' is performed.

=== Engagement ===
For betrothal (engagement), the boy's party goes to the girl's house. They meet and if they find the matter suitable, they decide to give 'Piyan' i.e. promise. They may also visit each other's houses to build familiarity.

=== Marriage ===
Usually Tuesday or Thursday is considered better for marriage. Pandal is erected for marriage; usually near the house. The people of the community or neighbors assist with this. To invite attendees to a marriage ceremony, rice with Haldi or Kanku are placed on the threshold of a house. This is symbolic suggestion. Nowadays, this is accompanied by a printed invitation card. The marriage is performed both traditionally as well as according to Hindu customs with a Brahmin performing it. Dinner follows marriage. This community believes in the customs of Aana, Khandhad marriage, love marriage, to marry a sister of a wife upon the wife's death (salivatu) or to marry a younger brother of husband, if the husband dies (Diyarvatu), polygamy, and remarriage after divorce.

=== Divorce ===
No divorce in this community can be given within three years of married life and no sexual relations can be kept while the spouse is living, nor a marriage with anybody is permitted. Those who disobey this rule are liable for a Rs. 351/- fine. In case the dispute is not resolved, one can approach the court.

=== Remarriage ===
A Gamit widow is permitted to remarry in the following circumstances: If a widow has a child, Rs. 32/- are to be given. All the marriages are registered in a book along with signature of both the parties.

=== Death ===
If a death occurs in a Gamit family, the body is kept near a grinding stone with the head pointed north and the legs, south. The drum is played in a peculiar way to announce the death. People come and cry. A dead body can either be cremated or buried. A child's body is buried. Ambli, Babool and Tick woods are used for cremation. The person carrying the fire-pot before the funeral pyre is a special person in a village. The ornaments from the body of a dead person are removed. The dead body is taken to a river bank; the family members move around a dead body for seven times. The mouth of a dead body is cleansed with a Khakhra brush and served curd, Khichdi, wine, etc. with turned hand. Then it is kept on the death-bed which is set aflame by relatives. Then they take bath at the river or a well. After they return home from the crematorium, they sit a little distance from the deceased's house; again the 'Tur' instrument is, played. Those who went at crematorium are served with sugar and jaggery. They have also a custom of Dahodo-pari, Khatru, Barma (giving lunch after death), and offering pooja.

=== Speciality ===
The marriages among Gamit are mostly in the same Gotra. The objective is to find a spouse from a known family. Astala, Mavli, and Vaghdev are their Gods and Goddesses. On occasion, they visit their places and celebrate festivals with dance and music.
