= Barda Wildlife Sanctuary =

Indian nature preserve

- IUCN category IV (habitat/species management area)
- Location within Gujarat Location within India
- Interactive map of Barda Wildlife Sanctuary
- Location: Gujarat, India
- Nearest city: Ranavav
- Coordinates: 21.851°N 69.699°E
- Area: 192.31 km^{2} (74.25 sq mi)
- Established: 1979

Barda Wildlife Sanctuary is located in Gujarat, India. It is situated approximately 31 kilometres (19 mi) from Ranavav, 49 kilometres (30 mi) from Porbandar and 100 kilometres (62 mi) west of Gir Forest National Park. Previous to its 1979 establishment as a wildlife sanctuary, Barda was a private reserve for Porbandar and Jamnagar. Approximately 4,00,000 people live in Barda.

== Geography ==
Barda is 282 square kilometres (109 sq mi) in size with an altitude of 79.2–617.8 meters (260–2,027 ft) above sea level. The terrain is hilly and undulating; there are slopes and exposed rocks. The tropical climate is characterized by very hot summers. There are two rivers, Bileshvary River and Joghri River, and two dams, Khambala and Fodara. There are several forest sub-types, such as southern tropical forest, southern dry mixed deciduous forest and northern tropical thorn forest, while other predominant flora include Euphorbia scrub, dry deciduous scrub, and dry bamboo brakes. The sanctuary area supports around 750 'maldhari' families in 68 'nesses'. The agricultural fields and wasteland, where water scarcity is the main problem. And these maldhari families encounter this problem throughout summer months. And the green patch of the sanctuary helps to provide ecological balance by improving the water system of the area by restoring the ground water. One can also visit Kileshwar, a temple improved by 'Jamsahib' of Jamnagar, is a magnificent attraction of this area. Barda Hills Wildlife Sanctuary range is a green valley, encompassed by timberland and agricultural fields.

== Flora and fauna ==
Barda Wildlife Sanctuary is a semi-arid ecosystem with hilly terrain and different vegetation types, including southern tropical forest, southern dry mixed deciduous forest, and northern tropical thorn forest. The vegetation is dominated by dry deciduous woodland and thorn scrub. The sanctuary has a high floral diversity, with approximately 368 recorded plant species, including trees, herbs, shrubs, and climbers.

The fauna of the sanctuary is similarly diverse, with around 376 species recorded. Among mammals, Barda supports a range of carnivores, most notably the Asiatic lion, Indian leopard, striped hyena, Indian jackal, and jungle cat, along with smaller carnivores like the small Indian civet and Indian grey mongoose and the occasional ratel.

The most abundant prey species in the sanctuary are the nilgai, Indian boar, and the Indian peafowl. Smaller mammals such as the Indian hare are also present. Historically, ungulates such as chital and sambar deer were driven to local extinction. A breeding center has been established here to restore the populations of these deer species.

== See also ==
- Arid Forest Research Institute
- List of national parks and wildlife sanctuaries of Gujarat, India
