= Bamcha =

Scheduled tribe in India

The Bamcha are a Hindu Scheduled Tribe found in the state of Gujarat and Maharashtra in India. They are also known as Bavcha and sometimes Bavecha.

== Origin ==
The Bamcha claim that their ancestors were soldiers in the army of the princely state of Baroda. They gave up their profession when the ruler of Baroda disbanded his army. The community is said to have lost its kshatriya status, when an ancestor drank from a leather container. They are now found mainly in Amreli, Baroda and Ahmedabad. The community speak the Bavchi dialect, but most can also speak Gujarati.
