= Barda (tribe) =

Scheduled tribe in India

The Barda are a tribal community found in the states of Gujarat and Maharashtra in India, where have the scheduled tribe status. The community is also known as Adivasi or Khandeshi Bhil.

== Origin ==
The word in the Gujarati language means a dweller of a hilly region, and the term Barda is now applied to members of the Bhil community who are said to have immigrated from Khandesh to Gujarat some three hundred years ago. The community is now settled in the districts of Mehsana, Ahmedabad, Baroda, and Surat. They spoke Gujarati.

In Maharashtra, the Barda are considered to be a sub-group of the Bhil ethnic group. According to their traditions, the community descended from Sabari Bhil, a well-known character from the Ramayana. The Bardas are concentrated in the districts of Dhule, Jalgaon, Nasik, Osmanabad, Sangli, Kolhapur and Sholapur. They speak Barda bhasha, which is related to Marathi. Most Barda also speak Gujarati.

== Present circumstances ==
=== In Gujarat ===
The Barda are strictly endogamous and practice clan exogamy. Their major clans are the Ahir, Baria, Dania, Gaikwad, Mali, Mori, and Thakur, all of whom intermarry. Historically, the Barda was a community of hunter-gatherers. The Barda has now settled as agriculturists, while many more are agricultural laborers. A few who have small pieces of land produce millets and pulses. The number of casual laborers from amongst the community.

The Barda have their tribal belief system, to which they have later added a pantheon of Hindu gods and goddesses. Like other tribal communities in the west India, they perform several folk dances and songs. Economically, they are a marginal community, and literacy levels are very low.

=== In Maharashtra ===
The Barda Bhil consist of a number of exogamous clans such as the More, Sonone, Thakre, Wagh, Gaikwad, Mali, and Phulpagare. Each of these clans is of equal status and intermarry. The community is strictly endogamous. Their traditional occupation was hunting and gathering. A small number have agricultural land, but most are landless agricultural labourers. A few are also employed by the police. The Barda Bhil have their own tribal deities such as Khanderaoji.
