= Agaria =

Salt farming Koli caste of Gujarat

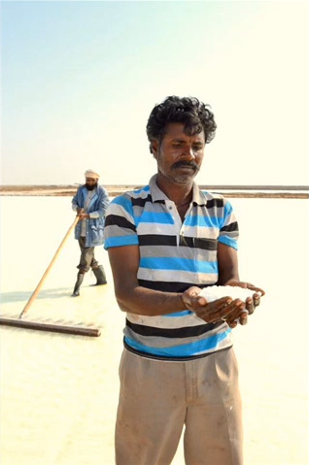
Agariya men farming salt in Kutch

The Agariya or Agaria is a title of Chunvalia Kolis who are salt farmers in Kutch district of Gujarat, India.

They produce 30% of the salt of the total of country. In 2019, Koli Agariyas faces the great loss of salt trade because of the Trade war between China and United States of America. They were listed as Criminal Tribe under Criminal Tribes Act of 1871 by British Indian government because of their rebellions against British rule in India.

The Koli Agariyas were landowners of the land of Little Rann of Kutch but in 1978 this area was declared as Wild Ass Sanctuary by Government of Gujarat and their lands were captured by Gujarat government. Koli Agariyas demanding recognition as farmers and an assurance that they have a legal right on Little Rann of Kutch land for salt farming to get the benefit like agriculture farmers such as money package and relief for natural calamities like flood.

== Farming ==
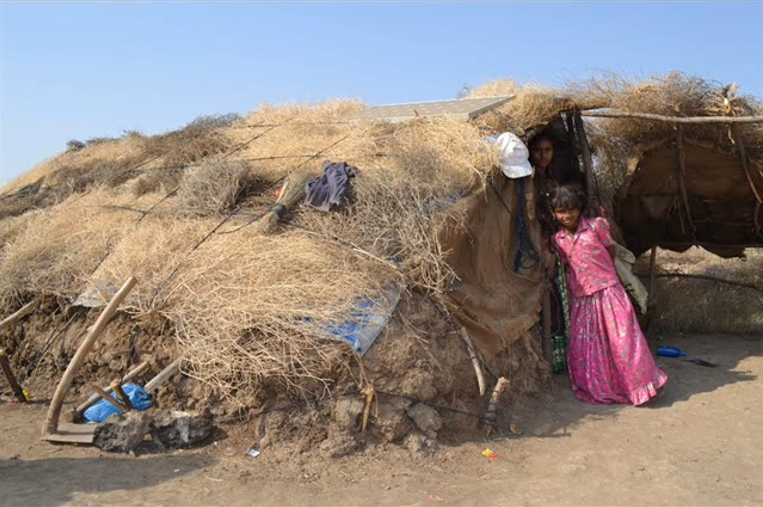
Temporary hut build nearby the salt ponds

Thousands of Agariya families make a living by manual salt farming in the desert of Gujarat, India. The farming follows a yearly cycle, beginning around October and lasting for about six months. It starts with building a temporary shelter and constructing salt evaporation ponds, followed by pumping high-salinity brine into the ponds, and then raking them daily over the next month as salt crystals form through evaporation, until the harvesting in spring.

The most health risks are associated with the raking, which involves exposure to extreme temperatures, skin diseases caused by the high salinity of the brine water, and loss of eyesight due to the intense brightness of sunlight reflecting off the salt.

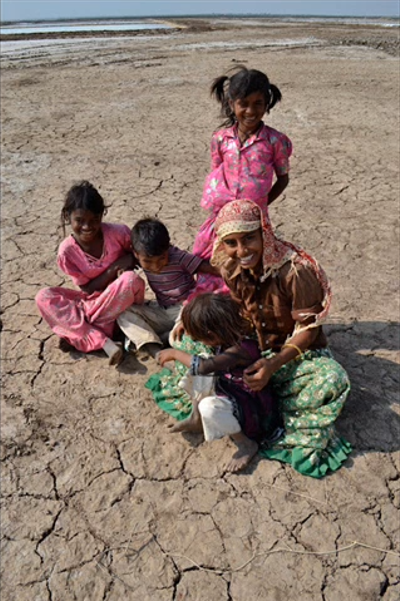
Agariya family

The life expectancy of these farmers is about 60 years. As of 2022, the market price received by the farmers was about 2 to 4 US dollars per ton, earning an average farming family around 2,000 US dollars for six months of work.

== Clans ==
Here are some of the clans used by Agariya title holder Kolis of Kutch,

- Jhala
- Makwana
- Jadav
- Chudasama
- Chauhan
- Parmar
- Rangpara
- Munjapara
- Jhinjhuvadia
- Katosana

== Classification ==
The Koli Agarias are classified as Other Backward Class by Government of Gujarat but in past they were notified as Criminal Tribe.

== Organisations ==
- Agariya Hitrakshak Manch
