= Tadvi Bhil =

Tribal community in India

- Religions: HinduIslam
- Languages: Marathi and Bhili
- Populated states: Maharashtra, Madhya Pradesh and Gujrat
- Subdivisions: 12 main clans

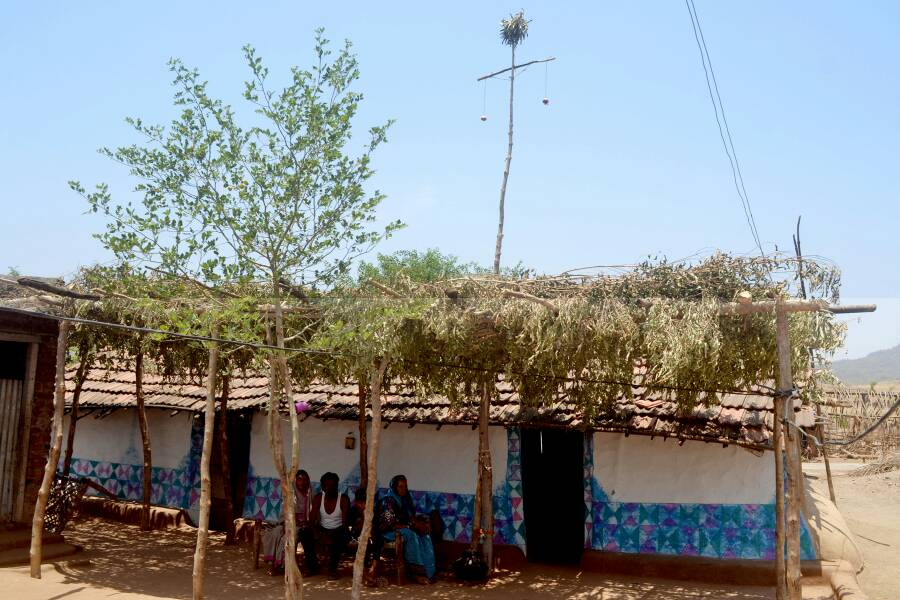
This is typical homes belongs to the Tadvi Bhils in Maharashtra's Satpuda region. This community is resident of Gujarat, Madhya Pradesh and Maharashtra's Satpuda Hills spread.

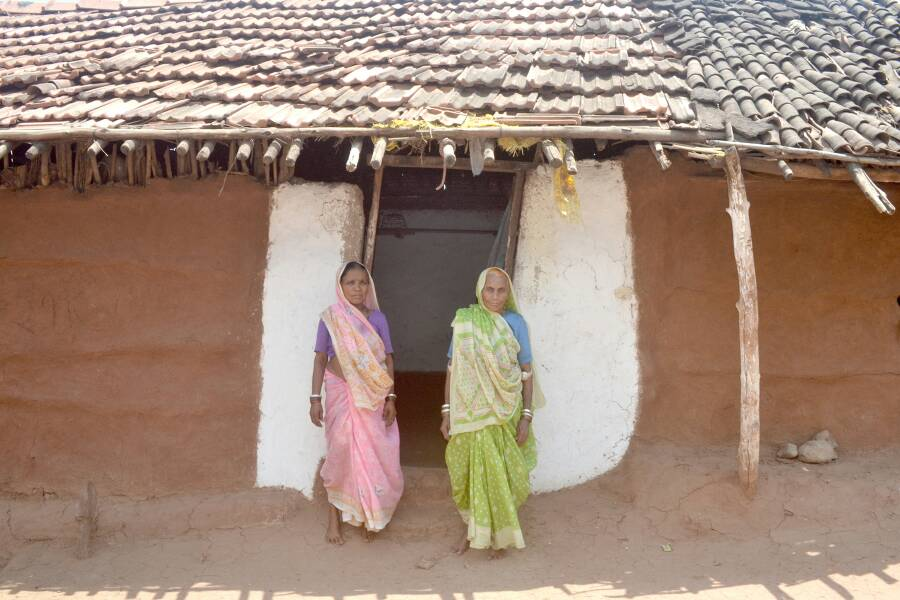
Residence of Tadvi

The Tadvi Bhil is a tribal community found in the states of Maharashtra, Gujarat, Madhya Pradesh and Rajasthan in India. They are a clan of the larger Bhil ethnic group. They use the surname Tadvi or sometimes the name of their Kul or Gan; the Dhankas of Gujarat and Maharashtra use Tadvi or Tetariya.

== History and origin ==
The Tadvi Bhil inhabit an area which roughly covers the border areas of the states of Gujarat, Madhya Pradesh and Maharashtra. This territory forms the core of the Faruqi kingdom, a medieval state in central India. In the Western part of this area, Tadvis and Vasavas are mainly Hindu but some Christian missionary activities are seen in this region. A close association between the Bhil of this region, and the Faruqi state led to the conversion of some of them to Islam. The dance that they perform on various occasions is known as Timli or Sajoni, commonly known as tribal dance.

== Present circumstance ==
The Tadvi speak a dialect of their own, also known as Tadvi, but many are switching to Marathi. Their language is also Dhanka and Bhilori, which belong to the Bhil group. They inhabit villages which are largely Tadvi. The community consists mainly of small cultivators. Like the wider Bhil community, they currently practise gotra exogamy, and are endogamous.

As of 2001, the Tadvi Bhil of Rajasthan were classified as a Scheduled Tribe under the Indian government's reservation program of positive discrimination.

== Tadvi Bhil and Tadvi tribe ==
The Tadvi Bhil tribe and the Tadvi tribe are two distinct tribes. Tadvi Bhil are part of the Bhil ethnic group whereas the Tadvi tribe is not Bhil, but a sub-tribe of the Dhanka ethnic group. Dhanka, once itself under the Bhil, separated nearly 900 years ago.

Anthropologist Megan Moodie says about Dhanka history that what does exist "tend[s] to be brief and stress their 'insignificance' and lowness". She notes that they are a sub-tribe of the Bhil people, and that they are today found throughout much of western India. Dhanka has 3 major sub-tribes; Tadvi, Tetaria and Valvi. Their occupations have changed over time, as circumstances have dictated. In the State of Maharashtra, the Tadvi tribe is mentioned at serial No. 13 whereas the Tadvi Bhil is placed at serial no. 8 in List of Scheduled Tribes in Maharashtra in accordance with The Scheduled Castes and Scheduled Tribes Orders (Amendment) Act 1976 (Act No. 108 of 1976). In the state of Gujarat, the Tadvi tribe is placed at serial No. 8 and the Tadvi Bhil at Serial No. 4 in List of Scheduled Tribes in Gujarat in accordance with Scheduled Castes and Scheduled Tribes Orders (Amendment) Act,1976. They speak Tadvi Boli Bhasha, unlike the Tadvi Bhil, who speak Bhilori. Both the tribes have a significant presence in the Dhule, Nandurbar and Jalgaon districts of Maharashtra State. Many Tadvi tribals migrated around the Marathwada region around 100–150 years ago, but Tadvi Bhil are found at the border of the Aurangabad and Jalgaon districts of Maharashtra state. The traditions of both tribes are similar but some differences exist.
