= Damor =

डामोर

Regions with significant populations
- Gujarat, India

Languages
- Bhili, Gujarati, Rajasthani, Hindi

Related ethnic groups
- Bhil, Schedule Tribe

The Damor are an ethnic community found indigenous to the current state of Rajasthan, Gujarat, Madhya Pradesh in India. They are also known as Damaria.

== Origin ==
The Damor form a section of the Bhil tribe. The Damor are found in the districts of Jhabua, Banswara, Dungarpur, Sabarkantha, Dahod and Panchmahal. They speak the bhili dialect, although many also speak Gujarati, Rajasthani, Hindi.

== Present circumstances ==
The Damor are an endogamous community and practice clan exogamy. Their main clans are the Parmar, Sisodia, Rathore, Chauhan, Solanki, Saradia and Karadiya. The Damor are mainly settled agriculturists, and include both landowners and sharecroppers.

As of 2001, the Damor of Rajasthan were classified as a Scheduled Tribe under the Indian government's reservation program of positive discrimination.
