= Bhagalia =

The Bhagalia are a clan of the Bhil ethnic community and are found in the state of Rajasthan, India.

An instance of it being a family name is Salim Bhagalia, a South African cricketer.
