= Pawra =

Tribal community in west india

The Pawra or Pawara tribe lives in the adjoining regions of Gujarat, Madhya Pradesh, and Maharashtra, with a major population concentrated in the Khandesh region. They are found in the Dhadgaon, Shahada, Taloda, and Akkalkuwa tehsils of Nandurbar district, as well as in the Jalgaon district.

The Pawara tribe has distinct customs, a unique social structure, and a different language compared to other tribes. Their economic activities are closely tied to the Satpura mountains. The social administration of the tribe is overseen by the head of the village society. The Bhil Pawaras, or Pavaras, are a subtribe of the Bhils found in Khandesh, and are also known as Pávra Bhils, Pávra Náiks, and Pávra Kolis. They celebrate three main festivals: Indiraja, Girhon Mata, and Shimga (or Holi).
