= Pardhi =

Hindu tribe in India

Pardhi is a Hindu tribe in India. The tribe is found mostly in Maharashtra and parts of Madhya Pradesh however small numbers can be found in Gujarat and Andhra Pradesh. The word Pardhi is derived from the Marathi word ‘Paradh’ which means hunting and Sanskrit word ‘papardhi’ which means hunting or the game to be hunted. In some parts of India Pardhis are known as Meywarees. They also have various other names like Advichincher, Phans Pardhi, Phanse Pardhi, Langoli Pardhi, Bahelia, Bahellia, Chita Pardhi, Shikari, Takankar, Takia Pardhi. Pardhi tribe is divided in groups like Vaghri Pardhi and Phase Pardhi. These are further divided into subgroups like Pal Pardhi, Gav Pardhi, Takankar, Takari. Widely found surnames among them include Chauhan (Chavan), Rathod and Solanki.

== History ==
The Pardhis claim to be descendants of the Rajputs, although this origin is not supported by verifiable historical evidence. They reportedly speak a dialect of Rajasthani among themselves, and their names often end with the suffix "-singh". It is also claimed that the Pardhis have adopted Rajput surnames such as Salunkhe, Rathod, Sindiya, and Chauhan (Chavan) in an effort to assert higher social status. Additionally, they are said to have adopted Maratha surnames such as Pawar, Shinde, and Dabhade. According to some accounts, the Pardhis originated in Rajasthan and migrated to Maharashtra and other states through Gujarat.

While in Gujarat, they took up Gujarati culture. They intermixed with Gujarati community and started speaking their language and also started worshipping Khodiyar Mata as their Kuldevi.

== Present day distribution ==
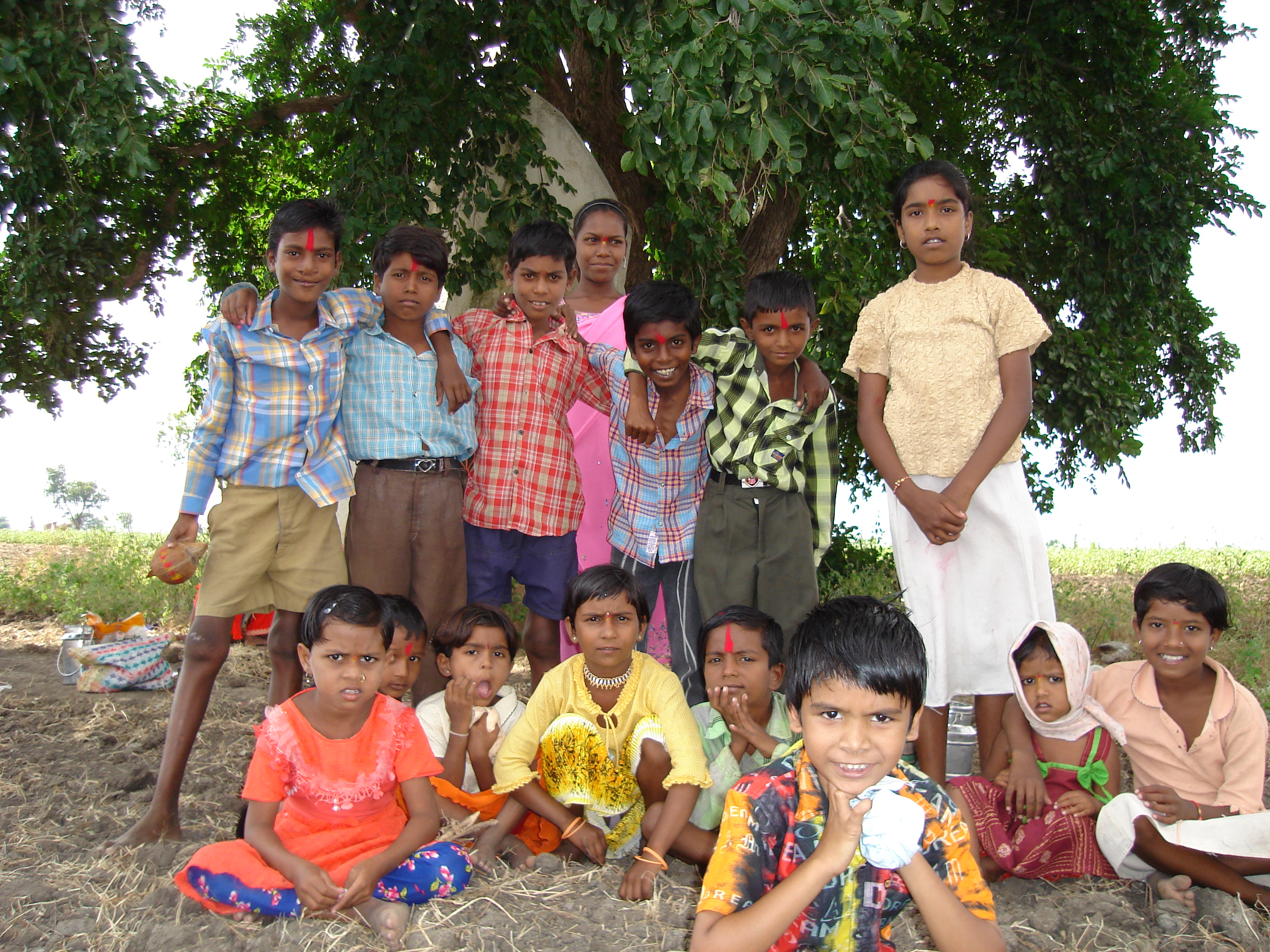
Pardhi children

According to the 1901 census in British India, the total number of Pardhi population was 12,214 of which 6,320 men and 5,894 women. During the same period in the state of Madhya Pradesh in the cities of Bhopal, Raisen and Sehore the total population of Pardhis were 1831. In the same state Bahelias and Chitas are also grouped with Pardhis. According to the 1981 census their number is 8,066. In Gujarat in 1981 census, Pardhi population is 814. In Maharashtra the Pardhi population is 95,115 (census data, 1981). According to 2001 census the total population of Pardhis in Maharashtra is 159,875. They are mainly spread over the districts of Amravati (20,568) Akola (17,578) Buldhana (16428) Jalgaon (16,849) Yavatmal (8,129) Osmanabad (9,959) Pune (7,230) and the other districts they are scattered. The Pardhi population data o f Mumbai is not available in the census record.

== Language ==
Pardhis speak mixed dialects of Rajasthani and Gujarati mainly Wagdi language and Pardhi language. These languages are grouped in Bhil languages of western Indo-Aryan language group. The Bhil languages form a link midway between the Gujarati language and the Rajasthani–Marwari languages. Pardhi language is a spoken language which is North Bareli dialect of Bhil languages. It is an important language of the community. Apart from Pardhi language they speak Gujarati, Rajasthani, Kanarese, Telugu, Marathi, Marwari, Ahirani languages depending on their location.

== Culture ==
Pardhi culture is very similar to Rajasthani culture due to their Rajasthani ancestry. However, their culture is a blend of Gujarati & Rajasthani culture. The marriage procession is of Rajasthani & Gujarati style. They follow the Shaktism sect of Hinduism and have certain Kuldevis similar to Rajputs. They worship Mauli Mata, Kalika Mata, Saptashrungi Mata, Vadekhan Mata and Khodiyar Mata as their Kuldevis. Dussehra is an important festival. They sacrifice a sheep or a goat to please the Kuldevis which is then distributed among the villagers. Animal sacrifice has been an integral part of Rajasthani culture since ancient times. However, the method of animal sacrifice is different in Pardhis than in Rajasthani Hindus. Rajasthani Hindus use the Jhatka method of sacrifice while the Pardhis use a method similar to Halal method, which is generally associated with Muslims.

In 2018, Dr. Mahendra Kumar Mishra, a noted tribal folklorist, documented the Pardhi Ramkatha from a noted Singer Smt Kumari Devi from Belsonda village of Mahasamund District of Chhattisgarh. Besides, they have abundant knowledge of forest ecology culture and the local technology represented in their first narratives. Pardhi people are still waiting for their land rights and are still depending on fast-vanishing forests.

== Criminal Branding ==
Pardhis were prolific hunters. They were experts in ancient weaponry like Bows & arrows, swords and hunting traps. This made them highly efficient in guerrilla warfare. They were a nuisance for the British Empire along with other 150 Tribes of India who participated in 1857 revolt. There were numerous other revolts against British by these tribal communities. To keep these tribal communities in check, British Brought the Criminal Tribes Act and branded these tribes as criminals from birth. The criminal branding of the tribe goes back to 1871 after the British passed the "Criminal Tribes Act". About a hundred and fifty tribes were branded as criminal, and the police were given sweeping powers to arrest them and watch over their movements.

T. V. Stephens, a British officer at that time quoted:

"... people from time immemorial have been pursuing the caste system defined job-positions: weaving, carpentry and such were hereditary jobs. So there must have been hereditary criminals also who pursued their forefathers’ profession."

Volume XII of the 1880 Bombay Presidency Gazette has further comments about the group stating:

"They are still fond of hunting and poaching and have not got rid of their turn for thieving.... The Phase Pardhi [a sub-tribe] is nearly always ragged and dirty, walking with a sneaking gait."

In 1952, the tribe was denotified as "criminal" and named as a nomadic tribe. However this has not changed the public perception of the tribe, and they continue to be stigmatized and live as outcasts, further aggravating their economic hardships.

Another Paradhi tribe called the Gav-Paradhi, settled primarily in the Amravati District Maharashtra, escaped the label of 'criminal tribe' as they were mostly agriculturalists.

== Discrimination ==
Public pressure often prevents the nomadic community from settling in villages.

Nowadays, most of the settled Pardhis practice agriculture due to the strict imposition of the ban on hunting and poaching. The nomads go door to door to sell inexpensive items, handicrafts, or food items. A major portion of the child beggars of Mumbai belong to the Pardhi community. Stigma coupled with the lack of education has essentially crippled the community.

== See also ==
- Tiger poaching in India
