= Dhanka =

Tribe in India

The Dhanka is a tribal community. They are found in Rajasthan, Haryana, Punjab, Gujarat, Maharashtra, Chhattisgarh and Madhya Pradesh. They have no relation with Dhanuks or Kurmis. They are historically Hindu and their occupations have changed over time, as circumstances have dictated for survival.

== Etymology ==
The Dhanka name may be derived from the somewhat pejorative word Dhanak, meaning a forest dweller. However, it could also come from dhanush, meaning bow, which may reflect a historic association with that weapon. Tribal people - as agriculturists and hunters - historically carried bows with them everywhere. Anthropologist Megan Moodie says that their history and culture is poorly documented and that what does exist "tend[s] to be brief and stress their 'insignificance' and lowness". She notes that they are a sub-tribe of the Bhil people, that they are today found throughout much of western India, and that there has been much official confusion regarding their identity, which has tended to impact on their position as a Scheduled Tribe (ST) entitled to various positive discrimination benefits. Much of that confusion centres around various names that have been posited as synonyms for including Dhankia and Valvi.

== Culture ==
The Dhanka share many cultural similarities with the Rathwa and Naikda tribal people, and are largely indistinguishable from them. The Rathwa provide pithora ritual paintings for the interior walls of Dhanka homes. Described by Shereen Ratnagar as "vibrant colours ... teeming with gods, people, plants, birds and animals", creation of this artform is unique to the Rathwa.

== Demographics ==
The 2001 Census of India recorded the Dhanka in the state of Rajasthan as one of the 30 STs which did not form part of the Bhil, Mina and Bhil Mina tribes. Those latter communities accounted for 93 per cent of the ST population at that time, whilst the combined population of the Dhanka, Tadvi, Tetaria and Valvi, which was recorded as being one community, comprised 77,047 people.

=== Haryana ===
The Dhanka of Haryana, also known as Delu (who become Bishnoi in 800 BC), is a community of weavers. They have been granted Scheduled Caste status in the reservation system and are found throughout the state.

=== Uttar Pradesh ===
In Uttar Pradesh, Dhanuk are given Scheduled Caste status and at the time of the 2011 Census of India, their population was 651,355 people.

There is some ambiguity in the use of the term dhanuk in the state. As per some scholars, this cast was largely associated with the scheduled tribe Bhil. However, some scholars like Professor Susan Wadley have described the Dhanuk as a "midwife caste". Janet Chawla has noted that using the term for midwives and people who work with trash "highlights the idea that birth-related work.

Sarah Pinto, an anthropologist, has noted that most people are engaged in agricultural work. She believes that there is an "overidentification of caste with iconic labour" and being more a reflection of the worldviews of both Brahmins and the later British colonisers than of reality.
