= Dungri Bhil =

The Dungri Bhil are a clan of the Bhil ethnic community and are indigenous to the Indian state of Rajasthan.

== Social status ==
As of 2001, the Dungri Bhil were classified as a Scheduled Tribe under the Indian government's reservation program of positive discrimination.
