= Bhil Meena =

Bhil Meena, Adivasi
भील मीणा,आदिवासी
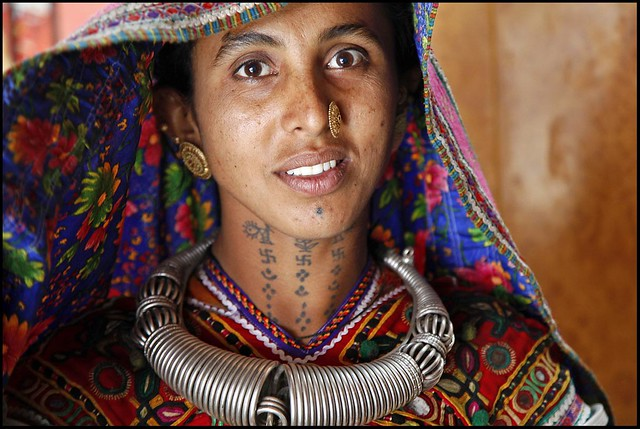
- Woman of Bhil Meena tribe.

Total population
- 1Lakh

Regions with significant populations
- India: 1,07,708
- Rajasthan,: 1,05,393
- Madhya Pradesh,: 2,244
- Chhattisgarh,: 71

Related ethnic groups
- • Bhil • Meena

The Bhil Meena (also spelled Bhil Mina) are a tribal group found in the state of Rajasthan, India.

Mainly they are mixed tribe of tribal Meenas and Bhils.

== Social status ==
As of 2001, the Bhil Meenas were classified as a Scheduled Tribe under the Indian government's reservation program of positive discrimination.

== Demographics ==
=== Rajasthan ===
Rajasthan, total
| Year | Pop. | ±% p.a. |
|---|---|---|
| 1901 | | — |
| 1911 | | — |
| 1921 | | — |
| 1931 | | — |
| 1941 | | — |
| 1951 | | — |
| 1961 | | — |
| 1971 | | — |
| 1981 | | — |
| 1991 | | — |
| 2001 | | — |
| 2011 | 105,393 | — |

=== Madhya Pradesh ===
Madhya Pradesh, total
| Year | Pop. | ±% p.a. |
|---|---|---|
| 1901 | | — |
| 1911 | | — |
| 1921 | | — |
| 1931 | | — |
| 1941 | | — |
| 1951 | | — |
| 1961 | | — |
| 1971 | | — |
| 1981 | | — |
| 1991 | | — |
| 2001 | | — |
| 2011 | 2,244 | — |
