= Dholi Bhil =

The Dholi Bhil are a clan of the Bhil ethnic community and are indigenous to the Indian state of Rajasthan.

== Social status ==
As of 2001, the Dholi Bhil were classified as a Scheduled Tribe under the Indian government's reservation program of positive discrimination.
