= Dungri Garasia =

The Dungri Garasia are a clan of the Bhil ethnic community found in the states of Gujarat and Rajasthan in India. They have the scheduled tribe status.

== Origin ==
The word Dungri literally hills and Garasia means a clearer of forest in the Rajasthani dialect. According to their traditions, this community of Bhils migrated from Mewar about 300 years ago, to escape the Muslim forces attacking Maharana Pratap. They are now found in the taluqas of Meghraj, Bhiloda, Vijaynagar, and Khed Brahma of Sabarkantha District, Gujarat, where the community still speaks Mewari.

== Present circumstances ==
=== Gujarat ===
In Gujarat, the Dungri Garasia are an endogamous community. They consist of two sub-divisions, the Bhagat and Sansari, who do not intermarry. These sub-divisions in turn consist of clans, which are exogamous. The major clan groupings are the Pandor, Parmar, Moria, Damor, Gameti, Taral, Bhagora and Katara.
