= Vasava people =

Ethnic group in India

The Vasava are an ethnic group found in the states of Gujarat, Maharashtra, and Rajasthan in India. They have scheduled tribe status. In Maharastra and Rajasthan, they are also known as Vasave.

== Origin ==
The Vasava in Gujarat trace their mythological descent from Eklavya. They originally hail from south Gujarat and Madhya Pradesh. The community are now found in districts of Baroda, Surat, Narmada, Bharuch and Panchmahal. They speak Bhili language such as Dehvali,Ambudi,Kotli,Mavchi although most can now speak Gujarati.

The Vasave in Maharashtra are found mainly in the Khandesh region. Their settlements exist mainly in the hilly and forest terrain of the Satpuda range. The Vasave speak the Bhil language, but most also speak Marathi. The Vasave are mainly a community of farmers, with animal husbandry being a secondary occupation. About 80% of the Vasave are Hindu, while the other 20% are Christians.

== Marriage ==
Historically, they were endogamous, but due to Brahminical Sanskritisation marriages have started to take place with other Bhil groups.

== Present circumstances ==
The Vasava of Gujarat are now an endogamous community and maintain village exogamy. They are traditionally a community of hunter-gatherers. Many are now agricultural labourers, and a few also own land. Those who own land grow paddy, sorghum, wheat, cereals and different kinds of pulses. The Vasava are Hindu, although they incorporate many earlier folk beliefs. Devmogra Mata is a Kuldevi of Vasava Tribal community.Temple of Devmogra Mata is situated in Devmogra village of Sagbara taluka Narmada District of Gujarat.

As of 2001, the Vasava in Rajasthan were classified as a Scheduled Tribe under the Indian government's reservation program of positive discrimination.
