= Mewasi =

Koli title

The Mewasi, or Mevasi, Mehwasi refers to a system of land tenure held by Rajputs and Kolis in Kathiawar region of Gujarat. It has been described as being similar to the talukdari system. Under Mughal administration, villages were classified based on their political stability, peaceful villages were categorised as rāsti while turbulent ones were categorised as mewasi. Mewasi villages were predominantly inhabited by Rajputs and Kolis. Mewasi villages were also termed as zamindari or talukdari by the Mughal administration.

== Kolis ==
In those days, Mewasi word was used to describe the unruly, turbulent and violent Kolis but during British Raj, Mewasi was used for Koli chieftains in rebellions against British rule as a hero.

Koli Mewasis liked the independent rule of self so they always fought against their Rajas, Maharajas and other rulers. Koli Mewasis often plundered the villages to collect the revenue.

In the fifteenth century, the early Sultans of Ahmedabad attempted to subjugate the Koli Mehwasis; but they were met with such a sturdy resistance from those chiefs, who were naturally helped by the wild nature of their Koli chiefs.

The Rewakantha settlements were made during the regime of Sayajirao. these areas were constantly disturbed by the depredations of the Koli Mehwasis, and the maintenance of law and order in these areas became a challenge for Baroda government.

The Barmuvada, Chhapra, Khumarwad were most notable Mewasi villages and their Koli chieftains were receiving Giras dues from Radhvanaj rulers.

The British government always faced the trouble in Mehwasi areas and used the troops to collect the annual revenue.
