= Kokna (tribe) =

Kokni, Kokna, Kukna
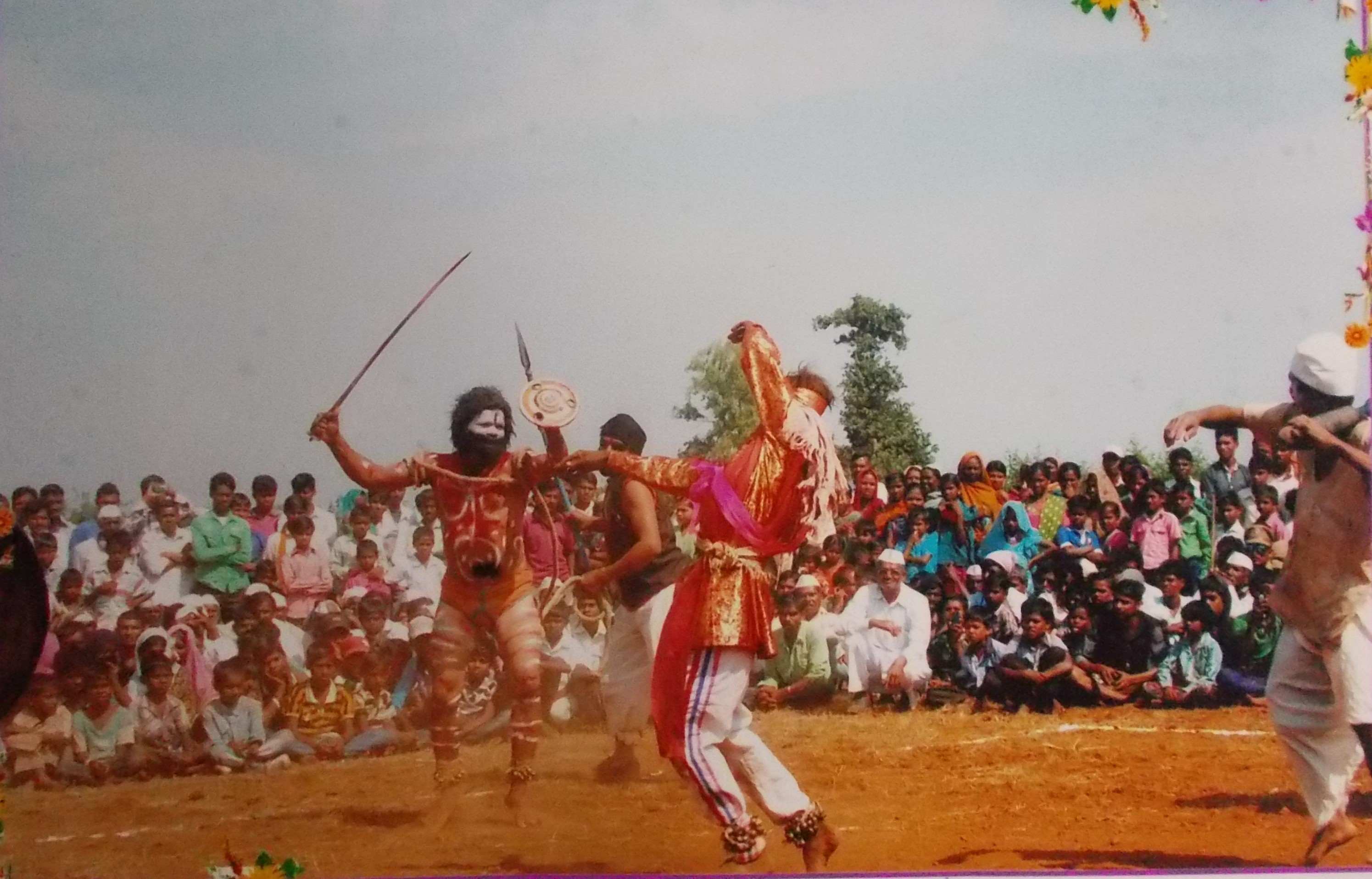

Regions with significant populations
- India: 1,049,411
- Maharashtra: 6,87,431
- Gujarat: 3,61,587
- South Gujarat: 3,27,967
- Rajasthan: 361
- Karnataka: 32

Languages
- Dhodia–Kukna language, Marathi, Gujarati

Kokni, Kokna, Kukna is an Indian Adivasi tribal community found in Sahyadri-Satpura Ranges of Maharashtra (mostly residing in Nandurbar and Dhule district, Nashik district - Surgana, Peith, Trimbakeshwar, Igatpuri districts – Sakri, Navapur talukas and in Gujarat (mostly residing in Ahwa-Dang, Navsari and Valsad districts) and is believed to have originated in the Konkan patti of Thane district. It is also known as Kokna, Kokni, and Kukna. There are various opinions regarding the origin of this tribe since no adequate research has been made. They are recognized as a scheduled tribe in the Indian states of Gujarat, Karnataka, Maharashtra and Rajasthan.

== Social life ==
Kokna-Kokni tribal society is an important society of ancient primitive culture and its social, economic, cultural and political life is characteristic. Considering the total population of the Kokni tribe, it can be seen that Kokni is the major tribe in Maharashtra. Although there are few historical references available regarding the origin of tribe from socio-cultural point of view, their current social customs and cultural practices confirm their primitiveness.

Interest and improvements in agriculture has resulted in prosperity and social stability of the tribe. Apart from this, the social status of the Koknas has remained high due to land ownership. Due to their high socio-economic status, the Kokna tribes consider themselves superior to other tribes.

== Religion and cultural life ==
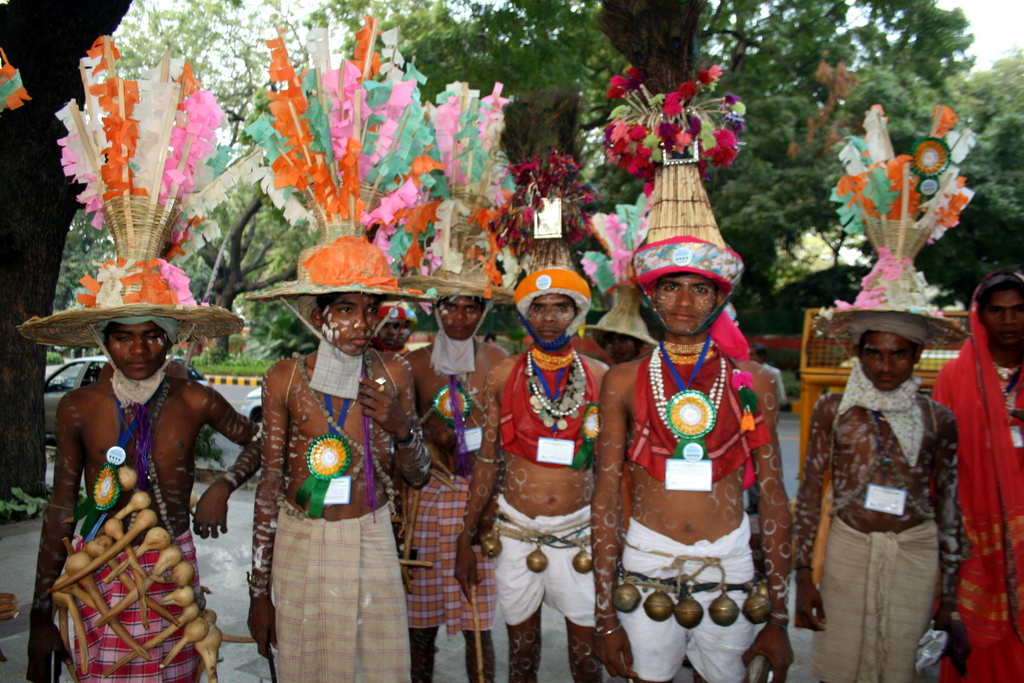
Kokna Tribals from Nandurbar after performance in Delhi, 2011

The animistic religious beliefs and practices practiced by the tribals are also seen in the Kokna tribe i.e. religion is the belief in supernatural powers and divine beings. Along with God of water, God of fire and God of animals, the Kokna also believe in demons. Koknas are mostly nature worshipers. Therefore, their deities and places of worship are also subject to the nature. Since the Kokna has been settled in agriculture for many years, they believe that rain is the supreme god. Their deities are based on daily life relationships such as 'Dhantari' which gives grain, 'Gavkari' which is used for farm work and 'Kansari' which makes a living. Worship rituals are performed to please the deities at the beginning of any auspicious work or financial activity. Since nature is the foundation of the socio-economic life of the Konkan, their conceptions of religion and theology have also developed on the basis of nature.

=== Dongaryadev Festival ===
The God of mountains (Dongaridev) is worshiped in the belief that God resides in a mountain cave and that his happiness and sadness affect the life's joys and sorrows. Dongaridev festival is celebrated by the whole villages and at least one person from each family in the village has to participate in this festival. 70–80 young and old people come together and dance in a circular motion and sing songs in their dialect. Various instruments are used for worship in this festival viz. flags, ghoongru kaathi (stick with bells), pawri, tapra, many marigold flowers, nachani and rice grains. The festival usually lasts for eight to ten days and finally, on the night before the full moon, they go at the foot of the mountain, dance all night, sing kokni songs, and descend from the hill in the morning after worshiping the mountain. During this festival all the virtues of kindness, cordiality, generosity, honesty, discipline, community life, purity of mind are 'discovered'.
