= Pateliya =

- Classification: Scheduled Tribe
- Religions: Hinduism
- Country: India

The Pateliya (Patelia) are a scheduled tribe found in the Indian states of Gujarat, Madhya Pradesh, Rajasthan and some parts of Maharashtra and Karnataka. Pateliya is considered a part of Bhil tribe.

== History ==
The term 'Pateliya' has been derived from the term Patel which locally means 'headman'.

The Pateliya are mostly distributed in Dahod, Mahisagar, Panchmahal districts of Gujarat and Jhabua, Dhar, Indore, Dewas, Guna districts of Madhya Pradesh. They speak Bhili or Malvi among themselves and Hindi with others.

Traditional occupation of the Pateliya is agriculture. They are in Variety of governmental services on higher posts. Apart from agriculture and services, several of them also work as wage labourers. Agriculture is an important source of earning.

== Clans and Subdivisions ==
The community is divided into several exogamous clans, including Hangaria, Mera, Gohari, Bhura, Damor, Parmar, Jhania, Dhak, Bariya, Gohil, Rathod, Solanki, Chauhan, Nalvaya, Bhabria, Musaria, Kochara, Bhuriya, Khaped, Bamaniya, and Amliar. All these clans enjoy equal social status within the community. These clans are further grouped into six broader categories—Parmar, Solanki, Jadav, Chauhan, Gohil, and Rathore—which appear to have been adopted from the Rajput clan structure.

The Parmar group includes clans such as Skya, Bhagat, Gangodiya, Budia, Glot, Godad, Wagal, Chautar, Kochara, Devaliya, Suswad, and Eal. The Solanki category consists of Jhaniya, Rojada (Rose), Nalwaya, Ananiya, Cohari, Bariya, and Hihor. Under Jadav, the main clans are Khaped, Bhuriya, Damor, and Hathila. The Chauhan group comprises Pasaya, Katara, Mori, Dundawa, Dhakiya, and Wawadiya. Gohil includes only one clan, Gamar, while the Rathore group contains two clans, Chota and Bada.

According to the Gazetteer of India (1972), "The Pateliya tribe found in Dahod claims Rajput descent." However, this claim lacks any historical or genealogical evidence.

== Present circumstances ==
The community traditionally practices settled agriculture, but they are landless, or the land owned is medium and small, and insufficient to sustain them. Nowadays they are in many different government services on both higher and smaller posts. But those are poor they migrate to Kota to work in the stone quarries and to Gujarat to work in different Industries. They profess Hinduism, and worship local deities such as Devkarji, Mataji, and Kalka Devi, Baba Ghodaja, Nihal Devi, Baba Khatri.

== See also ==
- Bhil
