= Bhil =

Indigenous community South Asia

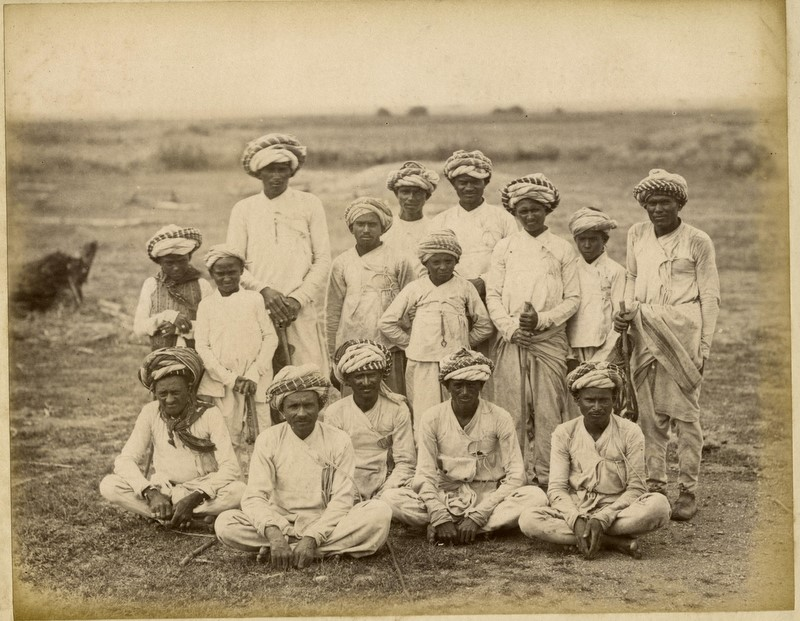
- Bhils of Sindh

Total population
- 17 million (2011, census)

Regions with significant populations
- India: 16,908,907
- Madhya Pradesh: 5,993,921
- Gujarat: 4,215,603
- Rajasthan: 4,100,264
- Maharastra: 2,588,658
- Karnataka: 6,204
- Tripura: 3,105
- Andhra Pradesh: 604
- Chhattisgarh: 547
- Pakistan (Sindh): 1,200,000 to 1,700,000 (2020)

Languages
- Bhil languages; Marathi; Gujarati; Sindhi Bhil; Hindi; Bengali

Religion
- Hindu • Christianity • Islam • Animism

Bhil or Bheel are various indigenous groups inhabiting western India, including parts of Rajasthan and Madhya Pradesh and in Sindh, Pakistan. Additionally they are also found in distant places such as Bengal and Tripura. Though they now speak the Bhili language, an Indo-Aryan language, the aboriginal language that the Bhil originally spoke is lost. Bhils are divided into a number of endogamous territorial divisions, which in turn have a number of clans and lineages.

Bhils are listed as tribal people in the states of Gujarat, Madhya Pradesh, Chhattisgarh, Maharashtra and Rajasthan—all in the western Deccan regions and central India—as well as in Bengal and Tripura in far-eastern India, on the border with Bangladesh. Many Bhils speak the dominant language of the region they reside in, such as Marathi, Gujarati or Bengali.

== Etymology ==
Some scholars suggest that the term Bhil is derived from the word billa or billu which means bow in the Dravidian lexis. The term Bhil is used to refer to "various ethnic communities" living in the forests and hills of Rajasthan's southern parts and surrounding regions of western India, highlighting the "popularity of the bow and arrow as a weapon among these groups". It is also used as a blanket term to refer to the aboriginal peoples of these areas.

== History ==
=== Bhil Rebellion ===
The Bhils of what is now the state of Gujarat rebelled on several occasions during the British colonial era, notably in 1846, 1857–58, and 1868.

Along with several other Indian social groups, the Bhils were designated as a criminal tribe by the British colonial government under the Criminal Tribes Act 1871, which meant that a Bhil could be "randomly picked up, tortured, maimed or even killed" by the colonial authorities. Susan Abraham notes that many of the tribes characterised as criminal under the Act had earlier rebelled against the East India Company and participated in the Indian Rebellion of 1857. She claims that the British colonial government legislated the Act in 1871 in the wake of these autochthonic tribes' proclivity for rebellion.

=== Mutiny against Mewar State ===
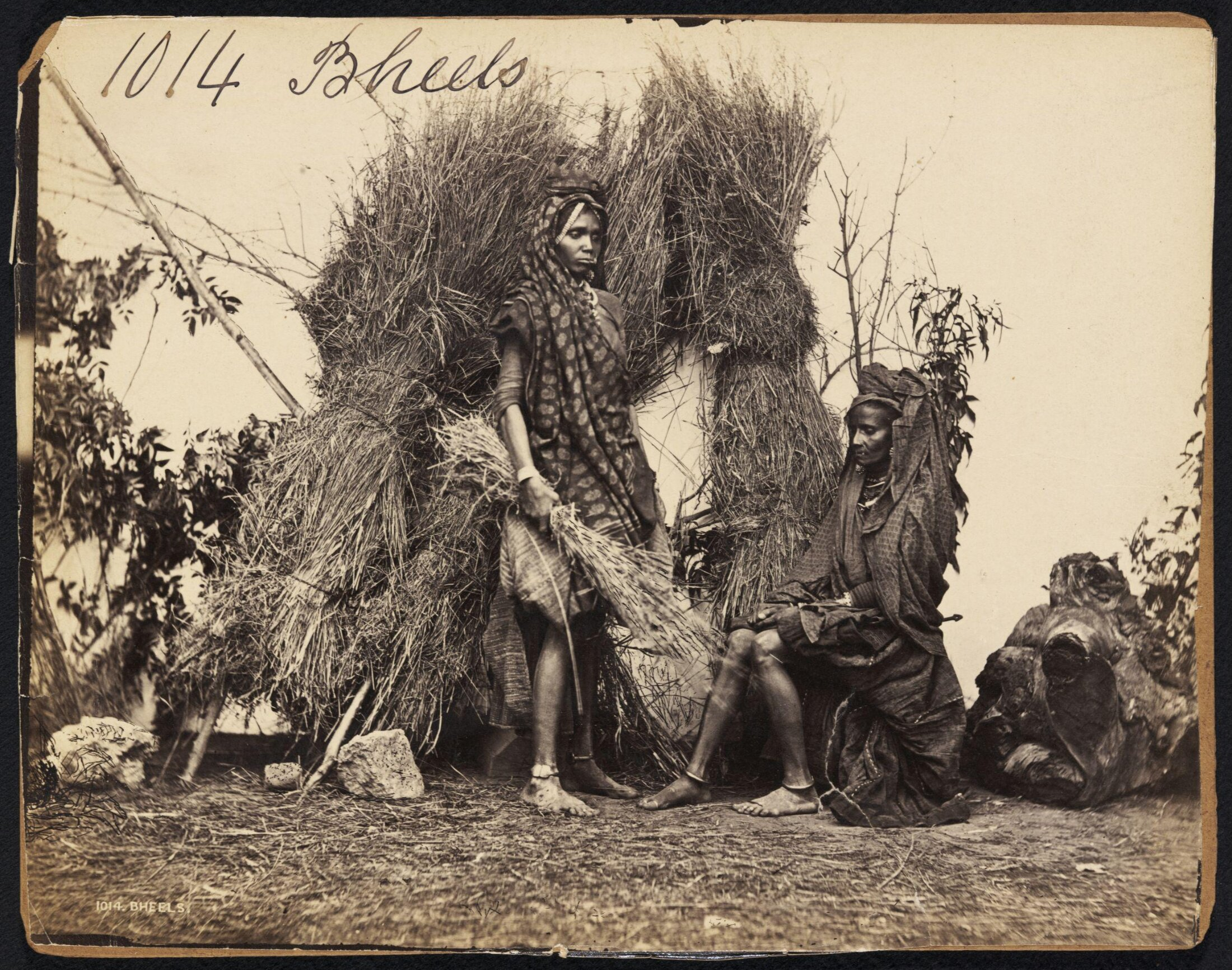
Bhil women

According to Ram Pande, in 1881, the Bhils protested against "the census classification, prohibition on alcohol manufacture, the establishment of police and customs, and the ban on the killing of witches". Their campaigning was stepped up and given meaning by Govind Guru who was a social and political leader. Pande suggests that because of his long-term Brahminical Hinduism missionary work among the tribe, Govind was able to stop them from consuming meat and alcohol and to pressurise the state for the formation of village councils that could administer their affairs and for barring forced labour. In 1917, Mewar State's Girasias joined the Bhils in the struggle to get the petty taxes and forced labour quashed, and to get the land revenues decreased. Taking note of these protests, the jagirdars of Mewar had called on a British political agent to suppress the mutiny. Pande noted that 1,500 Bhils got shot in 1913. In 1921, the tribals and peasants united under the leadership of Motilal Tejawat in the struggle against "forced labour, petty taxes, the disparity in taxes, high taxes and the tyrannical ways of the jagirdars". Tejawat's thoughts drew followers from the Bhils and Girasias of the Danta, Idar, Palanpur and Sirohi regions of Gujarat; and he "became a notorious offender against the state".

== Demographics ==
The Bhils are inhabitants of Dhar, Jhabua, Khargone and Ratlam districts of Madhya Pradesh. Bhilai (Bhil= Tribe, Aai= Came, meaning Bhils came), a city in Durg district of Chhattisgarh is named after this. A large number of Bhils live in the neighbouring states of Maharashtra, Gujarat, and Rajasthan. In Bengal, the Bauris represent the Bhil tribe. They constitute the largest tribe of India. According to Victoria R. Williams, the Bhils are India's "most widely dispersed tribal group". A small population of Bhils also resides in Pakistan's Sindh province, who are known as the Sindhi Bhils.

== Present circumstances ==
The Bhil are classified as a Scheduled Tribe in Andhra Pradesh, Chhattisgarh, Gujarat, Karnataka, Madhya Pradesh, Maharashtra, Rajasthan and Tripura under the Indian government's reservation program of positive discrimination.

== Subdivisions ==
The Bhil are divided into several endogamous territorial divisions, which in turn have several clans and lineages. In Rajasthan, they exist as Bhil Garasia, Dholi Bhil, Dungri Bhil, Dungri Garasia, Mewasi Bhil, Barda, Patelia, Kataria, Bagdi, Dhodia, Bhillava or Billava, Meena, Barela, Khotil, Dangchai, Dangehi, Nirdhi Bhil, Gamit, Rawal Bhil, Tadvi Bhil, Bhagalia, Bauris, Bhilala, Thakar, Rathwa, Pawra, Sonawane, Barda, Warli, Nayak, Nahals, Mathvadi, Dorepis, Dhanka, Vasava and Vasave. (Note: The Vasava and Vasave in Rajasthan may be alternate transliterations of the name for a single community. The sources are unclear regarding this.)

== Language ==
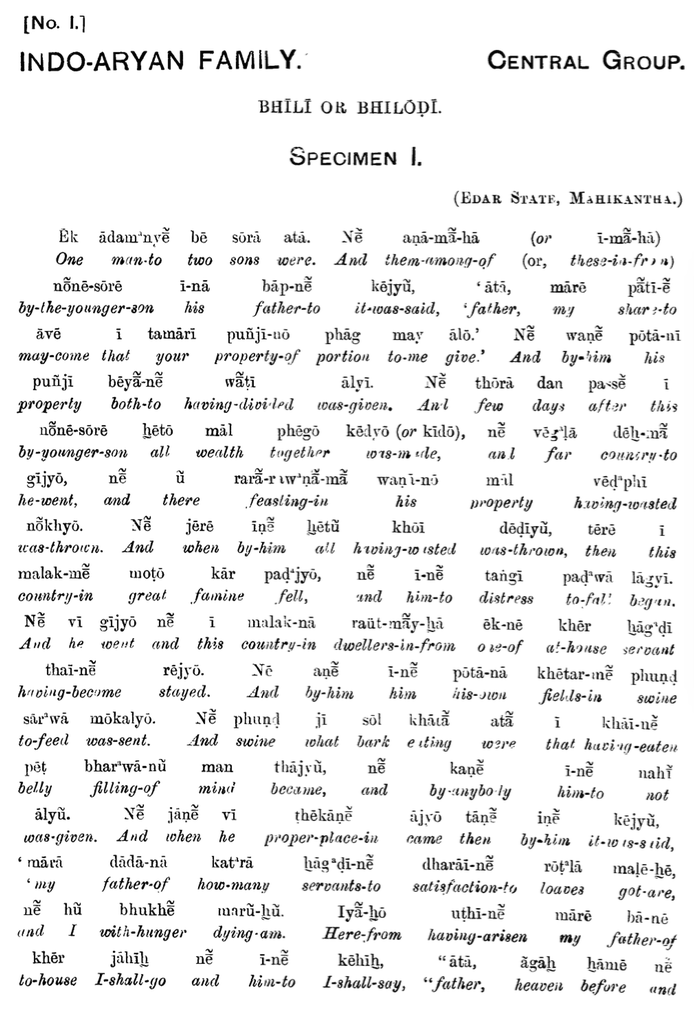
Partial specimen of the Bhili language

The language commonly spoken by Bhils throughout their geographic distribution is Bhili. Bhili has about up to 36 identified dialects and pronunciation differs by region. Bhili is based on Gujarati, but dialects of Bhili gradually merge into more widely spoken languages such as Marathi in the southeast and Rajasthani in the northwest. Around 10 million people recorded themselves as speaking a Bhili dialect in the census.

Estimates of individuals speaking the language are often inaccurate as speakers of minor languages like Bhili have sometimes been treated as having major languages (such as Marathi or Gujarati) as their mother tongue.

The Bhils in Sindh speak Sindhi Bhili and Dhatki.

== Culture and traditions ==
Bhils have a rich and unique culture. The Bhilala sub-division is known for its Pithora painting. Ghoomar is a traditional folk dance of the Bhil tribe. Ghoomar is the symbol of womanhood. Young girls take part in this dance and declare that they are stepping into the shoes of women.

=== Art ===
Bhil painting is characterised by the use of multi-coloured dots as in-filling. Bhuri Bai was the first Bhil artist to paint using readymade colours and paper. Other known Bhil artists include Lado Bai, Sher Singh, Ram Singh and Dubu Bariya.

=== Food ===
The main foods of Bhils are maize, onion, garlic, and chili which they cultivate in their small fields. They collect fruits and vegetables from the local forests. Wheat and rice are used at time of festivals and other special occasions only. They keep self-made bows and arrows, swords, knives, axes, etc. with them as weapons for self-defense and hunting the wild fauna which also form a major part of their diet. They profusely use alcohol distilled by them from the flower of Mahua (Madhuca longifolia). On festive occasions, various special preparations from the dish are rich, i.e. maize, wheat, barley, malt, and rice. Bhils are traditionally non-vegetarian.

=== Dress ===
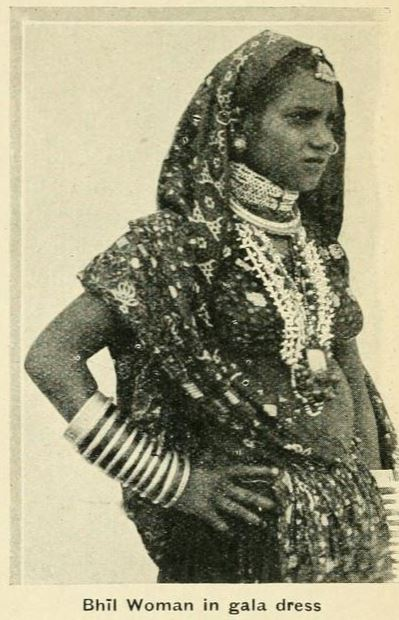
A Bhil woman in gala dress

The traditional dresses of men are the Pagri, Angarkha, Dhoti and Gamchha. Traditionally women wear Sari and Ghagra Choli.

There are many traditional ornaments of Bhils. Men wear Kada, Bajuband, Chain, ear rings, Kardhani. Women wear variety of ornaments such as hansli (ring) Zele-zumke, earrings in Bhil language, narniyan (bangle), nathni (nose-jewel) etc. Tattooing is a traditional custom among them. Women folks do tattooing generally before marriage.

=== Faith and worship ===
Every village has its local deity (Gramdev) and families too have their Jatidev, Kuldev and Kuldevi (house hold deity) which is symbolised by stones. 'Bhati dev' and 'Bhilat dev' are their serpent-god. 'Baba dev' is their village god. Karkulia dev is their crop god, Gopal dev is their pastoral god, Bag dev is their Lion god, Bhairav dev is their dog god. Some of their other gods are Indel dev, Bada dev, Mahadevel, Tejaji, Lotha mai, Techma, Orka Chichma and Kajal dev.

They have extreme and staunch faith in superstitious beliefs and Bhopas for their physical, mental, and psychological treatments.

- Bhensasaur - Bhil people worship buffalo as Bhensasaur

According to Victoria R. Williams, the Bhils "identify largely as Hindu". The Dang Bhils follow Christianity, and the Nirdhi and Tadivi Bhils follow Islam. A number of other Bhils follow Sonatan (Sanskrit: Sanatan) which is their "own religion". Williams states that Sonatan "blends Hindu beliefs and animistic philosophies".

=== Festivals ===
There are several festivals, viz. Rakhi, Navratri, Dashera, Diwali, Holi which are celebrated by the Bhils. They also celebrate some traditional festivals viz. Akhatij, Navmi, Howan Mata ki Chalavani, Sawan Mata ki jatar, Diwasa, Nawai, Bhagoria, Gal, Gar, Dhobi, Sanja, Indel, Doha etc. with ceremonious zeal and enthusiasm.

During some festivals, there are many tribal fairs held at different places in districts. Navratri mela, Bhagoria mela (during Holi festival) etc. Bhil community of Udaipur celebrate Gavari festival each year after Holi.

=== Types of Dance and Festivities ===
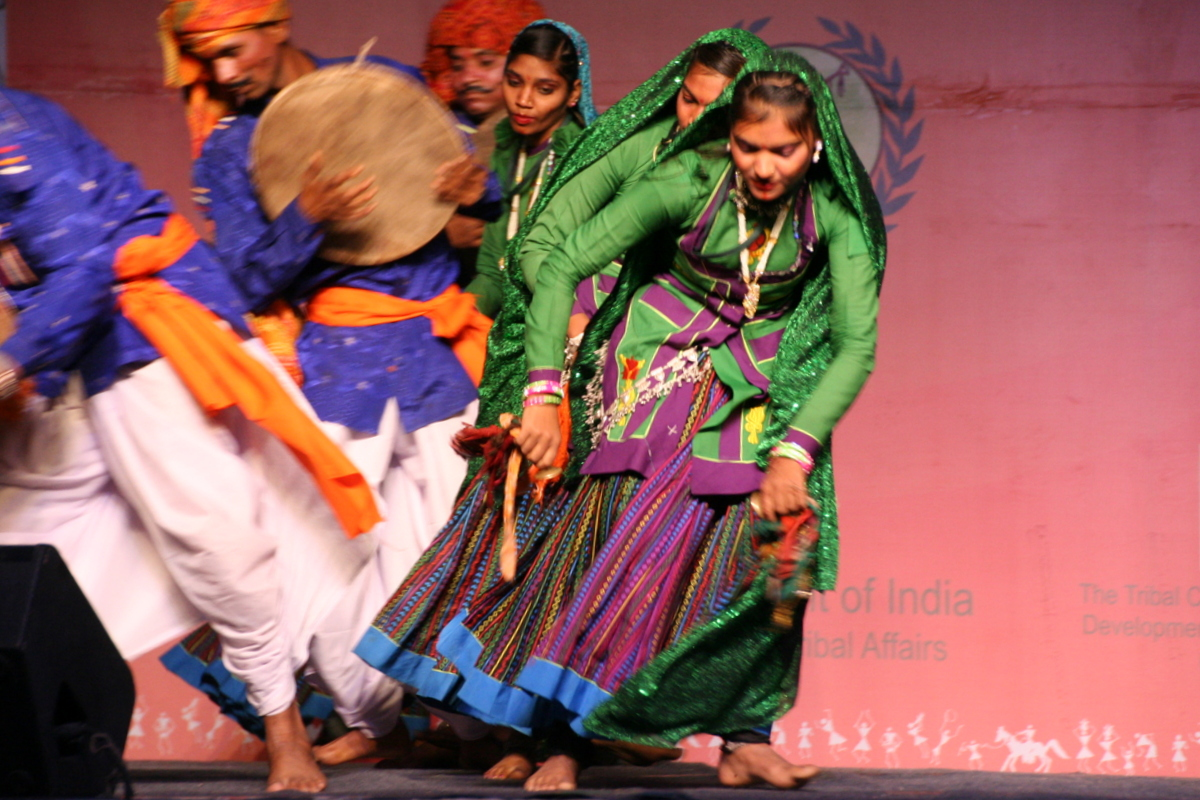
A performance by Bhil dancers in Delhi

The chief means of their recreation is folk songs and dances. Women dance at birth celebrations, marriage functions and on a few festivals in traditional Bhili style accompanied by a drum beat. Their dances include the Lathi (staff) dance, Dhol dance, marriage dance, Holi dance, Battle dance, Bhagoria dance, Deepawal dance, Sajoni dance and hunting dance. Musical instruments include the Harmonium, Sarangi, Kundi, Bansuri, Apang, Khajria, Tabla, Jhanjh, Mandal and Thali. They are usually made from local products.

=== Local political structure ===
Traditional Bhil village is led by a headman (Gameti). The gameti has authority and decision-making powers over most local disputes or issues.

== Bhil Pradesh Demand ==
There has been a demand for the establishment of a separate state of Bhil Pradesh or Bhil Desh by combining the tribal-dominated parts of Gujarat and neighbouring states Madhya Pradesh, Rajasthan, and Maharashtra. In 2014, when the Telangana state was formed, it reignited hopes of statehood again. In 2023, Aam Aadmi Party (AAP) MLA leader Chaitar Vasava raised demand for separate state of Bhil Pradesh.

== Notable people ==
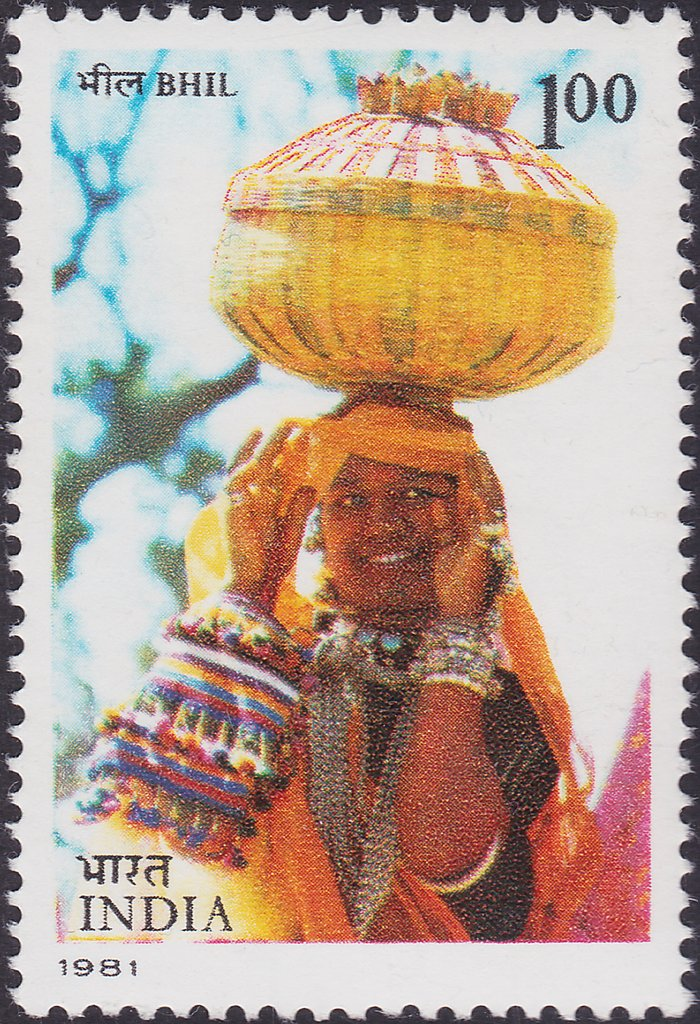
Bhil on Indian Postal Stamp, 1981

=== Artist ===
- Bhuri Bai, Artist
- Lado Bai, Artist

=== Freedom fighter ===
- Tantia Bhīl, freedom fighter
- Bhima Nayak, Freedom fighter

=== Politician ===
- Chhotubhai Vasava, Politician
- Rajkumar Roat, Politician

=== Players ===
- Nitin Bhille - Cricket player
- Dinesh Bhil - Archer

== See also ==
- Bhilala
- Rathwa
- Mewar Bhil Corps
- India tribal belt
