= List of Scheduled Tribes =

Tribal List of India

This is a list of Scheduled Tribes in India. The term "Scheduled Tribes" refers to specific tribes whose status is acknowledged to some formal degree by national legislation.

Percent of scheduled tribes in India by tehsils by census 2011

== Andaman and Nicobar Islands ==
In accordance with The Scheduled Castes and Scheduled Tribes Orders (Amendment) Act, 1976.

1. Andamanese, Chariar, Chari, Kora, Tabo, Bo, Yere, Kede, Bea, Balawa, Bojigiyab, Juwai, Kol
2. Jarawas
3. Nicobarese
4. Onges
5. Sentinelese
6. Shom Pens

== Andhra Pradesh ==
In accordance with The Scheduled Castes and Scheduled Tribes Orders (Amendment) Act, 1976.

1. Andh, Sadhu
2. Bagata
3. Bhil
4. Chenchu, Chenchwar
5. Gadabas
6. Gond, Naikpod, Rajgond
7. Goudu (in the Agency tracts, i.e.: Srikakulam, Vizianagaram, Visakhapatnam, East Godavari, West Godavari and Khammam districts)
8. Hill Reddi
9. Jatapus
10. Kammara
11. Kattunayakan
12. Kolam, Mannervarlu
13. Konda Dhoras
14. Konda Kapus
15. Konda Reddis
16. Kondhs, Kodi, Kodhu, Desaya Kondhs, Dongria Kondhs, Kuttiya Kondhs, Tikiria Kondhs, Yenity Kondhs
17. Kotia, Bentho Oriya, Bartika, Dhulia, Dulia, Holva, Paiko, Putiya, Sanrona, Sidhopaiko
18. Koya, Goud, Rajah, Rasha Koya, Lingadhari Koya (ordinary), Kottu Koya, Bhine Koya, Rajkoya
19. Kulia
20. Malis (excluding Adilabad, Hyderabad, Karimnagar, Khammam, Mahbubnagar, Medak, Nalgonda, Nizamabad and Warangal districts)
21. Manna Dhora
22. Mukha Dhora, Nooka Dhora
23. Nayaks (in the Agency tracts, i.e.: Srikakulam, Vizianagaram, Visakhapatnam, East Godavari, West Godavari and Khammam districts)
24. Pardhan
25. Porja, Parangiperja
26. Reddi Dhoras
27. Rona, Rena
28. Savaras, Kapu Savaras, Maliya Savaras, Khutto Savaras
29. Sugalis, Lambadis
30. Valmiki (in the Agency tracts, i.e.: Srikakulam, Vizianagaram, Visakhapatnam, East Godavari, West Godavari and Khammam districts)
31. Yenadis
32. Yerukulas
33. Nakkala, Kurvikaran
34. Dhulia, Paiko, Putiya(in Vishakhapatnam and Vijayanagara districts)

== Arunachal Pradesh ==
In accordance with The Scheduled Castes and Scheduled Tribes Lists (Modification) Order, 1956, as inserted by Act 69 of 1986, and as inserted by Amendment Act of 2018.

All tribes in the state including:

1. Omitted
2. Aka
3. Apatani
4. Nyishi
5. Galo
6. Tai Khamti
7. Khowa
8. Mishmi-Kaman (Miju Mishmi), Idu (Mishmi), Taraon (Digaru Mishmi)
9. Monpa, Momba, Sartang, Sajolong (Miji)
10. Nocte, Tangsa, Tutsa, Wancho
11. Sherdukpen
12. Singpho
13. Hrusso
14. Tagin
15. Khamba
16. Adi

== Assam ==
=== General areas ===
In accordance with The Scheduled Castes and Scheduled Tribes Orders (Amendment) Act, 1976 and The Scheduled Castes and Scheduled Tribes Orders (Amendment) Act, 2002.

1. Barmans in Cachar
2. Boro, Borokachari
3. Deori
4. Hojai
5. Kachari, Sonowal
6. Lalung
7. Mech
8. Miri
9. Rabha
10. Dimasa
11. Hajong
12. Singhpo
13. Khamti
14. Garo

=== Autonomous districts ===
In accordance with The Scheduled Castes and Scheduled Tribes Orders (Amendment) Act, 1976 and The Scheduled Castes and Scheduled Tribes Orders (Amendment) Act, 2002.

The autonomous districts comprise Bodoland Territorial Council, Karbi Anglong and North Cachar Hills districts.

1. Chakma
2. Dimasa, Kachari
3. Garo
4. Hajong
5. Hmar
6. Karbi
7. Khasi, Jaintia, Synteng, Pnar, War, Bhoi, Lyngngam
8. Any Kuki Tribes
9. Lakher
10. Man (Tai speaking)
11. Any Mizo (Lushai) tribes
12. Any Naga tribes
13. Pawi
14. Syntheng

== Bihar ==
In accordance with The Scheduled Castes and Scheduled Tribes Orders (Amendment) Act, 1976 and The Scheduled Castes and Scheduled Tribes Orders (Amendment) Act, 2002.

1. Asur
2. Baiga
3. Banjara
4. Bathudi
5. Bedia
6. Omitted
7. Binjhia
8. Birhor
9. Birjia
10. Chero
11. Chick Baraik
12. Gond
13. Gorait
14. Ho
15. Karmali
16. Kharia
17. Kharwar
18. Kondh
19. Kisan
20. Kora
21. Korwa
22. Lohara, Lohra
23. Mahli
24. Mal Pahariya
25. Munda
26. Oraon
27. Parhaiya
28. Santal
29. Sauria Paharia
30. Savar
31. Kanwar
32. Kol
33. Tharu

== Chhattisgarh ==
In accordance with The Scheduled Castes and Scheduled Tribes Orders (Amendment) Act, 1976 and as inserted by Act 28 of 2000, along with The Scheduled Castes and Scheduled Tribes Orders (Amendment) Act, 2002.

1. Agariya
2. Andh
3. Baiga
4. Bhaina
5. Bharia Bhumia, Bhuinhar Bhumia, Bhumiya, Bharia, Paliha, Pando
6. Bhattra
7. Bhil, Bhilala, Barela, Patelia
8. Bhil Mina
9. Bhunjia
10. Biar, Biyar
11. Binjhwar
12. Birhul, Birhor
13. Damor, Damaria
14. Dhanwar
15. Gadaba, Gadba
16. Gond; Arakh, Arrakh, Agaria, Asur, Badi Maria, Bada Maria, Bhatola, Bhimma, Bhuta, Koilabhuta, Kolibhuti, Bhar, Bisonhorn Maria, Chota Maria, Dandami Maria, Dhuru, Dhurwa, Dhoba, Dhulia, Dorla, Gaiki, Gatta, Gatti, Gaita, Gond, Gowari Hill Maria, Kandra, Kalanga, Khatola, Koitar, Koya, Khirwar, Khirwara, Kucha Maria, Kuchaki Maria, Madia, Maria, Mana, Mannewar, Moghya, Mogia, Monghya, Mudia, Muria, Nagarchi, Nagwanshi, Ojha, Raj Gond, 'Sonjhari, Jhareka, Thatia, Thotya, Wade Maria, Vade Maria, Daroi
17. Halba, Halbi
18. Kamar
19. Karku
20. Kawar, Kanwar, Kaur, Cherwa, Rathia, Tanwar, Chattri
21. Khairwar, Kondar
22. Kharia
23. Kondh, Khond, Kandh
24. Kol
25. Kolam
26. Korku, Bopchi, Mouasi, Nihar, Nahul, Bondhi, Bondeya
27. Korwa, Kodaku
28. Majhi
29. Majhwar
30. Mawasi
31. Munda
32. Nagesia, Nagasia
33. Oraon, Dhanka, Dhangad
34. Pao
35. Pardhan, Pathari, Saroti
36. Pardhi, Bahelia, Bahellia, Chita Pardhi, Langoli Pardhi, Phans Pardhi, Shikari, Takankar, Takia (in (i) Bastar, Dantewara, Kanker, Raigarh, Jashpurnagar, Surguja and Koria districts; (ii) Katghora, Pali, Kartala and Korba tehsils of Korba district' (iii) Bilaspur, Pendra, Kota and Takhatpur tehsils of Bilaspur district; (iv) Durg, Patan, Gunderdehi, Dhamdha, Balod, Gurur and Dondilohara tehsils of Durg district; (v) Chowki, Manpur and Mohala Revenue Inspector Circles of Rajnandgon district' (vi) Mahasamund, Saraipali and Basna tehsils of Mahasamund district; (vii) Bindra-Navagarh Rajim and Deobhog tehsils of Raipur district; and (viii) Dhamtari, Kurud and Sihava tehsils of Dhamtari district)
37. Parja
38. Sahariya, Saharia, Seharia, Sehria, Sosia, Sor
39. Saonta, Saunta
40. Saur
41. Sawar, Sawara
42. Sonr
43. Binjhia

== Dadra and Nagar Haveli ==
In accordance with The Constitution (Dadra & Nagar Haveli) Scheduled Tribes Order, 1962.

1. Dhodia
2. Dubla including Halpati
3. Kathodi
4. Kokna
5. KoliDhor including Kolgha
6. Naikda or Nayaka
7. Varli

== Daman and Diu ==
In accordance with The Constitution (Goa, Daman and Diu) Scheduled Tribes Order, 1968 and as inserted by Act 18 of 1987.

1. Dhodia
2. Dubla (Halpati)
3. Naikda (Talavia)
4. Siddi (Nayaka)
5. Varli

== Goa ==
In accordance with The Constitution (Goa, Daman and Diu) Scheduled Tribes Order, 1968 and as inserted by Act 18 of 1987 and The Scheduled Castes and Scheduled Tribes Orders (Amendment) Act, 2002.

1. Dhodia
2. Dubla (Halpati)
3. Naikda (Talavia)
4. Siddi (Nayaka)
5. Varli
6. Kunbi
7. Gawda
8. Velip

== Gujarat ==
In accordance with The Scheduled Castes and Scheduled Tribes Orders (Amendment) Act, 2002.

1. Barda
2. Bavacha, Bamcha
3. Bharwad (in the Nesses of the forests of Alech, Barada and Gir)
4. Bhil, Bhil Garasia, Dholi Bhil, Dungri Bhil, Dungri Garasia, Mewasi Bhil, Rawal Bhil, Tadvi Bhil, Bhagalia, Bhilala, Pawra, Vasava, Vasave
5. Charan (in the Nesses of the forests of Alech, Barada and Gir)
6. Chaudhri (in Surat and Valsad districts)
7. Chodhara
8. Dhanka, Tadvi, Tetaria, Valvi
9. Dhodia
10. Dubla, Talavia, Halpati
11. Gamit, Gamta, Gavit, Mavchi, Padvi
12. Gond, Rajgond
13. Kathodi, Katkari, Dhor Kathodi, Dhor Katkari, Son Kathodi, Son Katkari
14. Kokna, Kokni, Kukna
15. Koli Dhor, Tokre Koli, Kolcha, Kolgha
16. Kunbi (in the Dangs district)
17. Naikda, Nayaka, Cholivala Nayaka, Kapadia Nayaka, Mota Nayaka, Nana Nayaka
18. Padhar
19. Pardhi, Advichincher, Phanse Pardhi (excluding Amreli, Bhavnagar, Jamnagar, Junagadh, Kutch, Rajkot and Surendranagar districts)
20. Patelia
21. Pomla
22. Rabari (in the Nesses of the forests of Alech, Barada and Gir). The area comprises Jamnagar and Junagadh districts.
23. Rathawa
24. Siddi (in Amreli, Bhavnagar, Jamnagar, Junagadh, Rajkot and Surendranagar districts)
25. Varli
26. Vitola, Kotwalia, Barodia
27. Bhil, Bhilala, Barela, Pateliya
28. Tadvi Bhil, Bavra, Vasave
29. Padvi

== Himachal Pradesh ==
In accordance with The Scheduled Castes and Scheduled Tribes Order (Amendment), 2002.

1. Bhot, Bodh
2. Gaddi
3. Gujjar
4. Jad, Lamba, Khampa
5. Kanaura, Kinnara
6. Lahaula
7. Pangwala
8. Swangla
9. Beda
10. Domba, Garo, Zoba

In accordance with The Constitution (Scheduled Tribes) Order (Third Amendment) Act, 2022.

11. Hatee (in Trans-Giri region of Sirmaur district)

== Jammu and Kashmir ==
In accordance with The Constitution (Jammu & Kashmir) Scheduled Tribes Order, 1989 and The Constitution (Scheduled Tribes) Order (Amendment) Act, 1991.

1. Bakarwal
2. Balti
3. Beda
4. Bot, Boto
5. Brokpa, Drokpa, Dard and Shin
6. Changpa
7. Gaddi
8. Garra
9. Gujjar and Bakarwal
10. Mon
11. Purigpa
12. Sippi

In accordance with The Constitution (Jammu and Kashmir) Scheduled Tribes Order (Amendment) Act, 2024.

13. Pahari Ethnic Group
14. Paddari
15. Koli
16. Gadda Brahmin

== Jharkhand ==
In accordance with The Scheduled Castes and Scheduled Tribes Orders (Amendment) Act, 1976 and as inserted by Act 30 of 2000 and Scheduled Castes and Scheduled Tribes Order (Amendment) Act, 2002.

1. Asur
2. Baiga
3. Banjara
4. Bathudi
5. Bedia
6. Bhumij
7. Binjhia
8. Birhor
9. Birjia
10. Chero
11. Chick Baraik
12. Gond
13. Gorait
14. Ho
15. Karmali
16. Kharia
17. Kharwar
18. Khond
19. Kisan
20. Kora
21. Korwa
22. Lohra
23. Mahli
24. MalPahariya
25. Munda
26. Oraon
27. Parhaiya
28. Santhal
29. Sauria Paharia
30. Savar
31. Kawar
32. Kol
33. Puran

== Karnataka ==
In accordance with The Scheduled Castes and Scheduled Tribes Orders (Amendment) Act, 1976 and as inserted by Act 39 of 1991.

1. Adiyan
2. Barda
3. Bavacha, Bamcha
4. Bhil, Bhil Garasia, Dholi Bhil, Dungri Bhil, Dungri Garasia, Mewasi Bhil, Rawal Bhil, Tadvi Bhil, Bhagalia, Bhilala, Pawra, Vasava, Vasave
5. Chenchu, Chenchwar
6. Chodhara
7. Dubla, Talavia, Halpati
8. Gamit, Gamta, Gavit, Mavchi, Padvi, Valvi
9. Gond, Naikpod, Rajgond
10. Gowdalu
11. Hakkipikki
12. Hasalaru
13. Irular
14. Iruliga
15. Jenu Kuruba
16. Kadu Kuruba
17. Kammara (in Dakshina Kannada district and Kollegal taluk of Chamarajanagar district)
18. Kaniyan, Kanyan (in Kollegal taluk of Chamarajanagar district)
19. Kathodi, Katkari, Dhor Kathodi, Dhor Katkari, Son Kathodi, Son Katkari
20. Kattunayakan
21. Kokna, Kokni, Kukna
22. Koli Dhor, Tokre Koli, Kolcha, Kolgha
23. Konda Kapus
24. Koraga
25. Kota
26. Koya, Bhine Koya, Rajkoya
27. Kudiya, Melakudi
28. Kuruba (in Kodagu district)
29. Kurumans
30. Maha Malasar
31. Malaikudi
32. Malasar
33. Malayekandi
34. Maleru
35. Maratha (in Kodagu district)
36. Marati (in Dakshina Kannada district)
37. Meda
38. Naikda, Nayaka, Cholivala Nayaka, Kapadia Nayaka, Mota Nayaka, Nana Nayaka, Naik, Nayak, Beda, Bedar and Valmiki
39. Palliyan
40. Paniyan
41. Pardhi, Advichincher, Phanse Pardhi
42. Patelia
43. Rathawa
44. Sholaga
45. Soligaru
46. Toda
47. Varli
48. Vitolia, Kotwalia, Barodia
49. Yerava
50. Siddi (in Belagavi, Dharwad and Uttara Kannada district)

== Kerala ==
In accordance with The Scheduled Castes and Scheduled Tribes Orders (Amendment) Act, 1976 and The Scheduled Castes and Scheduled Tribes Order (Amendment) Act, 2002.

1. Adiyan
2. Arandan
3. Eravallan
4. Hill Pulaya
5. Irular, Irulan
6. Kadar
7. Omitted
8. Kanikaran, Kanikkar
9. Kattunayakan
10. Kochu Velan
11. Omitted
12. Omitted
13. Koraga
14. Omitted
15. Kudiya, Melakudi
16. Kurichchan
17. Kurumans
18. Kurumbas
19. Maha Malasar
20. Malai Arayan
21. Malai Pandaram
22. Malai Vedan
23. Malakkuravan
24. Malasar Tribe
25. Malayan (in the areas comprising the Malabar district as specified by sub-section (2) of section 5 of the States Reorganisation Act, 1956 (37 of 1956)). Malabar district comprises Kannur (earlier Cannanore), Kozhikode, Malappuram districts and Palakkad (earlier Palaghat) district excluding Chittur taluk.
26. Malayarayar
27. Mannan
28. Marati (in Hosdurg Taluk and Kasaragod taluks of Kasaragod district)
29. Muthuvan, Mudugar, Muduvan
30. Omitted
31. Omitted
32. Palliyar
33. Paniyan
34. Ulladan
35. Uraly
36. Malavettuvan (in Kasaragod and Kannur district)
37. Ten Kurumban, Jenu Kurumban
38. Thachanadan, Thachanandan Moopan
39. Cholanaikkan
40. Mavilan
41. Karimpalan
42. Vetta Kuruman
43. Mala Panicker

== Ladakh ==
In accordance with The Constitution (Jammu & Kashmir) Scheduled Tribes Order, 1989, The Constitution (Scheduled Tribes) Order (Amendment) Act, 1991, and The Constitution (Scheduled Tribes) Order (Amendment) Act, 1991.

1. Bakarwal
2. Balti
3. Beda
4. Bot, Boto
5. Brokpa, Drokpa, Dard and Shin
6. Changpa
7. Gaddi
8. Garra
9. Gujjar and Bakarwal
10. Mon
11. Purigpa
12. Sippi

== Lakshadweep ==
In accordance with The Scheduled Castes and Scheduled Tribes Lists (Modification) Order, 1956 and the Laccadive, Minicoy and Amindivi Islands (Alteration of Name) (Adaptation of Laws) Order, 1974.

1. Inhabitants of the Lakshadweep who, and both of whose parents, were born in the Union Territory.

== Madhya Pradesh ==
In accordance with The Scheduled Castes and Scheduled Tribes Orders (Amendment) Act, 1976.

1. Agariya
2. Andh
3. Baiga
4. Bhaina
5. Bharia Bhumia, Bhuinhar Bhumia, Bhumiya, Bharia, Paliha, Pando
6. Bhattra
7. Bhil, Bhilala, Barela, Patelia
8. Bhil Meena
9. Bhunjia
10. Biar, Biyar
11. Binjhwar
12. Birhul, Birhor
13. Damor, Damaria
14. Dhanwar
15. Gadaba, Gadba
16. Gond; Arakh, Arrakh, Agaria, Asur, Badi Maria, Bada Maria, Bhatola, Bhimma, Bhuta, Koilabhuta, Koliabhuti, Bhar, Bisonhorn Maria, Chota Maria, Dandami Maria, Dhuru, Dhurwa, Dhoba, Dhulia, Dorla, Gaiki, Gatta, Gatti, Gaita, Gond Gowari, Hill Maria, Kandra, Kalanga, Khatola, Koitar, Koya, Khirwar, Khirwara, Kucha Maria, Kuchaki Maria, Madia, Maria, Mana, Mannewar, Moghya, Mogia, Monghya, Mudia, Muria, Nagarchi, Nagwanshi, Ojha, Raj, Sonjhari Jhareka, Thatia, Thotya, Wade Maria, Vade Maria, Daroi
17. Halba, Halbi
18. Kamar
19. Karku
20. Kawar, Kanwar, Kaur, Cherwa, Rathia, Tanwar, Chattri
21. Keer (in Bhopal, Raisen and Sehore districts)
22. Khairwar, Kondar
23. Kharia
24. Kondh, Khond, Kandh
25. Kol
26. Kolam
27. Korku, Bopchi, Mouasi, Nihal, Nahul, Bondhi, Bondeya
28. Korwa, Kodaku
29. Majhi
30. Majhwar
31. Mawasi
32. Omitted
33. Munda
34. Nagesia, Nagasia
35. Oraon, Dhanka, Dhangad
36. Panika (in Chhatarpur, Datia, Panna, Rewa, Satna, Shahdol, Sidhi and Tikamgarh districts)
37. Pao
38. Pardhan, Pathari Saroti
39. Omitted
40. Pardhi; Bahelia, Bahellia, Chita Pardhi, Langoli Pardhi, Phans Pardhi, Shikari, Takonkar, Takankar, Takia (in (i) Bastar, Chhindwara, Mandla, Raigarh, Seoni and Surguja districts; (ii) Baihar tehsil of Balaghat district; (iii) Betul and Bhainsdehi tehsils of Betul district; (iv) Bilaspur and Katghora tehsils of Bilaspur district; (v) Durg and Balod tehsils of Durg district; (vi) Chowki, Manpur and Mohala Revenue Inspectors Circles of Rajnandgaon district; (vii) Murwara, Patan and Sihora tehsils of Jabalpur district; (viii) Hoshangabad and Sohagpur tehsils of Hoshangabad district and Narsimhapur district; (ix) Harsud tehsil of East Nimar district; and (x) Dhamtari and Mahasamund districts and Bindra-Nawagarh tehsil of Raipur district)
41. Parja
42. Sahariya, Saharia, Seharia, Sehria, Sosia, Sor
43. Saonta, Saunta
44. Saur
45. Sawar, Sawara
46. Sonr

== Maharashtra ==
In accordance with The Scheduled Castes and Scheduled Tribes Orders (Amendment) Act, 1976.

1. Andh
2. Baiga
3. Barda
4. Bavacha, Bamcha
5. Bhaina
6. Bharia Bhumia, Bhuinhar Bhumia, Pando
7. Bhattra
8. Bhil, Bhil Garasia, DholiBhil, Dungri Bhil, Dungri Garasia, Mewasi Bhil, Rawal Bhil, Tadvi Bhil, Bhagalia, Bhilala, Pawra, Vasava, Vasave
9. Bhunjia
10. Binjhwar
11. Birhul, Birhor
12. Dhanka, Tadvi, Tetaria, Valvi
13. Dhanwar
14. Dhodia
15. Dubla, Talavia, Halpati
16. Gamit, Gamta, Gavit, Mavchi, Padvi
17. Gond, Rajgond, Arakh, Arrakh, Agaria, Asur, Badi Maria, Bada Maria, Bhatola, Bhimma, Bhuta, Koilabhuta, Koilabhuti, Bhar, Bisonhorn Maria, Chota Maria, Dandami Maria, Dhuru, Dhurwa, Dhoba, Dhulia, Dorla, Gaiki, Gatta, Gatti, Gaita, Gond, Gowari, Hill Maria, Kandra, Kalanga, Khatola, Koitar, Koya, Khirwar, Khirwara, Kucha Maria, Kuchaki Maria, Madia, Maria, Mana, Mannewar, Moghya, Mogia, Monghya, Mudia, Muria, Nagarchi, Naikpod, Nagwanshi, Ojha, Raj, Sonjhari Jhareka, Thatia, Thotya, Wade Maria, Vade Maria
18. Halba, Halbi
19. Kamar
20. Kathodi, Katkari, Dhor Kathodi, Dhor Kathkari, Son Kathodi, Son Katkari
21. Kawar, Kanwar, Kaur, Cherwa, Rathia, Tanwar, Chattri
22. Khairwar
23. Kharia
24. Kokna, Kokni, Kukna
25. Kol
26. Kolam, Mannervarlu
27. Koli Dhor, Tokre Koli, Kolcha, Kolgha
28. Koli Mahadev, Dongar Koli
29. Malhar Koli
30. Kondh, Khond, Kandh
31. Korku, Bopchi, Mouasi, Nihal, Nahul, Bondhi, Bondeya
32. Koya, Bhine Koya, Rajkoya
33. Nagesia, Nagasia
34. Naikda, Nayaka, Cholivala Nayaka, Kapadia Nayaka, Mota Nayaka, Nana Nayaka
35. Oraon, Dhangad
36. Pardhan, Pathari, Saroti
37. Pardhi: Advichincher, Phans Pardhi, Phanse Pardhi, Langoli Pardhi, Bahelia, Bahellia, Chita Pardhi, Shikari, Takankar, Takia
38. Parja
39. Patelia
40. Pomla
41. Rathawa
42. Sawar, Sawara
43. Thakur, Thakar, Ka Thakur, Ka Thakar, Ma Thakur, Ma Thakar
44. Varli
45. Vitolia, Kotwalia, Barodia

== Manipur ==
In accordance with The Scheduled Castes and Scheduled Tribes Orders (Amendment) Act, 1976 and The Scheduled Castes and Scheduled Tribes Orders (Amendment) Act, 2002.

1. Aimol
2. Anal
3. Angami
4. Chiru
5. Chothe
6. Gangte
7. Hmar
8. Kabui
9. Kacha Naga
10. Koirao
11. Koireng
12. Kom
13. Lamgang
14. Mao
15. Maram
16. Maring
17. Any Mizo (Lushai) tribes
18. Monsang
19. Moyon
20. Paite
21. Purum
22. Ralte
23. Sema
24. Simte
25. Suhte
26. Tangkhul
27. Thadou
28. Vaiphui
29. Zou
30. Poumai Naga
31. Tarao
32. Kharam
33. Any Kuki Tribes
34. Mate

== Meghalaya ==
In accordance with The Scheduled Castes and Scheduled Tribes Orders (Amendment) Act, 1976 and The Constitution (Scheduled Tribes) Order (Amendment) Act, 1987.

1. Boro Kacharis
2. Chakma
3. Dimasa, Kachari
4. Garo
5. Hajong
6. Hmar
7. Khasi, Jaintia, Synteng, Pnar, War, Bhoi, Lyngngam
8. Koch
9. Any Kuki Tribes
10. Lakher
11. Man (Tai speaking)
12. Any Mizo (Lushai) tribes
13. Mikir
14. Any Naga tribes
15. Pawi
16. Raba, Rava
17. Synteng

== Mizoram ==
In accordance with The Scheduled Castes and Scheduled Tribes Lists (Modification) Order, 1956 and as inserted by Act 81 of 1971.

1. Chakma
2. Dimasa (Kachari)
3. Garo
4. Hajong
5. Hmar
6. Khasi and Jaintia (including Khasi Synteng or Pnar, War, Bhoi or Lyngngam)
7. Any Kuki Tribes
8. Lakher
9. Man (Tai speaking)
10. Any Mizo (Lushai) tribes
11. Mikir
12. Any Naga tribes
13. Pawi
14. Synteng
15. Paite

== Nagaland ==
In accordance with The Constitution (Nagaland) Scheduled Tribes Order, 1970.

1. Garo
2. Kachari
3. Kuki
4. Mikir
5. Naga

== Odisha ==
In accordance with The Scheduled Castes and Scheduled Tribes Orders (Amendment) Act, 1976.

1. Bagata, Bhakta
2. Baiga
3. Banjara, Banjari
4. Bathudi, Bhaturi
5. Bhottada, Dhotada, Bhotra, Bhatra, Bhattara, Bhotora
6. Bhuiya, Bhuyan
7. Bhumia
8. Bhumij, Teli Bhumij, Haldipokhria Bhumij, Haladi Pokhria Bumij, Desia Bhumij, Tamaria Bhumij
9. Bhunjia
10. Binjhal, Binjhwar
11. Binjhia, Binjhoa
12. Birhor
13. Bondo Poraja, Bonda Poraja, Banda Paroja
14. Chenchu
15. Dal
16. Desua Bhumij
17. Dharua
18. Didayi
19. Gadaba, Bodo Gadaba, Gutob Gadaba, Ollaro Gadaba, Parenga Gadaba, Sano Gadaba
20. Gandia
21. Ghara
22. Gond, Gondo
23. Ho
24. Holva
25. Jatapu
26. Juang
27. Kandha Gauda
28. Kawar
29. Kharia, Kharian, Berga Kharia, Dhelki Kharia, Dudh Kharia, Erenga Kharia, Munda Kharia, Oraon Kharia, Pahadi Kharia
30. Kharwar
31. Khond, Kond, Kandha, Nanguli Kandha, Sitha Kandha, Buda Khond, Bara Khanda, Desia Khanda, Kandha Gauda, Malua Khond, Raja Khond
32. Kisan, Nagesar, Nagesia
33. Kol
34. Kolah Loharas, Kol Loharas
35. Kolha
36. Koli, Malhar
37. Kondadora
38. Kora, Khaira, Khayara
39. Korua
40. Kotia
41. Koya, Gumba Koya, Koitur Koya, Kamara Koya, Musar Koya
42. Kulis
43. Lodha, Nodh, Nodha, Lodh
44. Madia
45. Mahali
46. Mankidi
47. Mankirdia, Mankria, Mankirdi
48. Matya, Matia
49. Mirdhas, Kuda, Koda
50. Munda, Munda Lohara, Munda Mahalis, Nagabanshi Munda, Odiya Munda
51. Mundari
52. Omanatya
53. Oraon, Dhangar, Uran
54. Parenga
55. Paroja, Parja, Bodo Paroja, Barong Jhodia Paroja, Chhelia Paroja, Jhodia Paroja, Konda Paroja, Ponga Paroja, Sodia Paroja, Solia Paroja
56. Pentia
57. Rajuar
58. Santal
59. Saora, Arsi Saora, Based Saora, Bhima Saora, Chumura Saora, Jati Saora, Jauri Saora, Kampu Saora, Kadu Saora, Kimpal Saora, Kumbi Kancher Saora, Kalapithia Saora, Kirat Saora, Lanjia Saora, Lamba Saora, Laria Saora, Maria Saora, Uriya Saora, Raika Saora, Sudda Saora, Tankala Saora, Patro Saora, Savar, Saura, Sahara
60. Shabar, Lodha
61. Sounti
62. Tharua
63. Mukha Dora, Nuka Dora, Muk Dora (in the undivided district of Karaput, which includes Koraput, Nabarangpur, Rayagada and Malkangiri district)
64. Konda Reddy, Konda Reddi

== Puducherry ==
In accordance with The Scheduled Castes and Scheduled Tribes Orders (Amendment) Act, 2002.

1. Irular (including Vettai and Vettaikaran)

== Rajasthan ==
In accordance with The Scheduled Castes and Scheduled Tribes Orders (Amendment) Act, 1976.

1. Bhil, Bhil Garasia, Dholi Bhil, Dungri Bhil, Dungri Garasia, Mewasi Bhil, Rawal Bhil, Tadvi Bhil, Bhagalia, Bhilala, Pawra, Vasava, Vasave
2. Bhil Mina
3. Damor, Damaria
4. Dhanka, Tadvi, Tetaria, Valvi
5. Garasia (excluding Rajput Garasia)
6. Kathodi, Katkari, Dhor Kathodi, Dhor Katkari, Son Kathodi, Son Katkari
7. Kokna, Kokni, Kukna
8. Koli Dhor, Tokre Koli, Kolcha, Kolgha
9. Mina
10. Naikda, Nayaka, Cholivala Nayaka, Kapadia Nayaka, Mota Nayaka, Nana Nayaka
11. Patelia
12. Seharia, Sehria, Sahariya

== Sikkim ==
In accordance with The Constitution (Sikkim) Scheduled Tribes Order, 1978 and The Scheduled Castes and Scheduled Tribes Orders (Amendment) Act, 2002.

1. Bhutia (including Chumbipa, Dopthapa, Dukpa, Kagatey, Sherpa, Tibetan, Tromopa, Yolmo)
2. Lepcha
3. Limboo
4. Tamang

== Tamil Nadu ==
In accordance with The Scheduled Castes and Scheduled Tribes Orders (Amendment) Act, 1976.

1. Adiyan
2. Aranadan
3. Badagas
4. Eravallan
5. Irular
6. Kadar people
7. Kammara (excluding Kanniyakumari district and Shencottah taluk of Tirunelveli district)
8. Kanikaran, Kanikkar (in Kanniyakumari district and Shencottah taluk of Tirunelveli district)
9. Kaniyan, Kanyan
10. Kattunayakan
11. Kochu Velan
12. Konda Kapus
13. Kondareddis
14. Koraga
15. Kota (excluding Kanniyakumari district and Shencottah taluk of Tirunelveli district)
16. Kudiya, Melakudi
17. Kurichchan
18. Kurumbas (in the Nilgiri district)
19. Kurumans
20. Maha Malasar
21. Malai Arayan
22. Malai Pandaram
23. Malai Vedan
24. Malakkuravan
25. Malasar
26. Malayali (in Dharmapuri, Vellore, Tiruvannamalai, Pudukkottai, Salem, Namakkal, Villupuram, Cuddalore, Tiruchirappalli, Karur and Perambalur districts)
27. Malayekandi
28. Mannan
29. Mudugar, Muduvan
30. Muthuvan
31. Palleyan
32. Palliyan
33. Palliyar
34. Paniyan
35. Sholaga
36. Toda (excluding Kanniyakumari district and Shencottah taluk of Tirunelveli district)
37. Uraly

== Telangana ==
In accordance with The Scheduled Castes and Scheduled Tribes Orders (Amendment) Act, 1976 and The Andhra Pradesh Reorganization Act, 2014.

1. Andh
2. Bagata
3. Bhil
4. Chenchu
5. Gadabas, Bodo Gadaba, Gutob Gadaba, Kallayi Gadaba, Parangi Gadaba, Kathera Gadaba, Kapu Gadab
6. Gond, Naikpod, Rajgond, Koitur
7. Goudu (in the Agency Tracts)
8. Hill Reddis
9. Jatapus
10. Kammara
11. Kattunayakam
12. Kolam, Kolawar
13. Konda Dhoras
14. Konda Kapus
15. Konda Reddis
16. Kondhs, Kodi, Kodhu, Desaya Kondhs, Dongria Kondhs, Kuttiya Kondhs, Tikiria Kondhs, Yenity Kondhs
17. Kotia, Bentho Oriya, Bartika, Dhulia, Dulia, Holva, Paiko, Putiya, Sanrona, Sidhopaiko
18. Koya, Goud, Rajah, Rasha Koya, Lingadhari Koya (ordinary), Kottu Koya, Bhine Koya, Rajkoya
19. Kulia
20. Manna Dhora
21. Mukha Dhora, Nooka Dhora
22. Nayaks (in the Agency tracts, i.e.: Srikakulam, Vizianagaram, Visakhapatnam, East Godavari, West Godavari and Khammam districts)
23. Pardhan
24. Porja, Parangiperja
25. Reddi Dhoras
26. Rona, Rena
27. Savaras, Kapu Savaras, Maliya Savaras, Khutto Savaras
28. Sugalis, Lambadis
29. Thoti (in Adilabad, Hyderabad, Karimnagar, Khammam, Mahbubnagar, Medak, Nalgonda, Nizamabad and Warangal districts)
30. Yenadis
31. Yerukulas
32. Nakkala, Kurvikaran

== Tripura ==
In accordance with The Scheduled Castes and Scheduled Tribes Orders (Amendment) Act, 1976.

1. Bhil
2. Bhutia
3. Chaimal
4. Chakma
5. Garoo
6. Halam
7. Jamatia
8. Khasia
9. Kuki
10. Lepcha
11. Lushai
12. Mag
13. Munda, Kaur
14. Noatia
15. Orang
16. Riang
17. Santal
18. Tripura, Tripuri, Tippera
19. Uchai

== Uttar Pradesh ==
In accordance with The Constitution (Scheduled Tribes) (Uttar Pradesh) Order, 1967.

1. Bhotia
2. Buksa
3. Jaunsari
4. Raji
5. Tharu
6. Agariya (in the district of Sonbhadra)
7. Baiga (in the district of Sonbhadra)
8. Bhuiya, Bhuinya (in the district of Sonbhadra)
9. Chero (in the districts of Sonbhadra and Varanasi)
10. Gond, Dhuria, Nayak, Pathari, Raj Gond (in the districts of Maharajganj, Sidharth Nagar, Basti, Gorakhpur, Deoria, Kushinagar, Mau, Azamgarh, Jaunpur, Ballia, Ghazipur, Varanasi, Mirzapur, and Sonbhadra)
11. Kharwar, Khairwar (in the districts of Deoria, Balia, Ghazipur, Varanasi and Sonbhadra)
12. Pankha, Panika (in the districts of Sonbhadra and Mirzapur)
13. Parahiya (in the district of Sonbhadra)
14. Patari (in the district of Sonbhadra)
15. Saharia (in the district of Lalitpur)

== Uttarakhand ==
Formerly Uttaranchal. In accordance with The Constitution (Scheduled Tribes) (Uttar Pradesh) Order, 1967 and as inserted by Act 29 of 2000.

1. Bhotia
2. Buksa
3. Jaunsari
4. Raji
5. Tharu

== West Bengal ==
In accordance with The Scheduled Castes and Scheduled Tribes Orders (Amendment) Act, 1976 and The Scheduled Castes and Scheduled Tribes Orders (Amendment) Act, 2002.

1. Asur
2. Baiga
3. Bedia, Bediya
4. Bhumij
5. Bhutia, Sherpa, Toto, Dukpa, Kagatay, Tibetan, Yolmo
6. Birhor
7. Birjia
8. Chakma
9. Chero
10. Chik Baraik
11. Garo
12. Gond
13. Gorait
14. Hajang
15. Ho
16. Karmali
17. Kharwar
18. Khond
19. Kisan
20. Kora
21. Korwa
22. Lepcha
23. Lodha, Kheria, Kharia
24. Lohara, Lohra
25. Magh
26. Mahali
27. Mahli
28. Mal Pahariya
29. Mech
30. Mru
31. Munda
32. Nagesia
33. Oraon
34. Parhaiya
35. Rabha
36. Santal
37. Sauria Paharia
38. Savar
39. Limboo
40. Tamang

== Statistics ==
=== Most populous Scheduled Tribes ===
The following list shows the 33 largest Scheduled Tribes according to the Census in India 2011 (76% ≈ 80 of a total of 104 million members) with their population development (population explosion from +25%), their proportions and their gender distribution (number of female relatives per 1000 male) as well as the populated states/territories – the growth rates from 2001 can also be due to new government regulations, so some subgroups were assigned differently:

	Scheduled Tribes	Population	Growth rate	Percent	Sex ratio	Notified States and Union Territories
0	India	104,281,034	+23.66 %	100%	990 : 1000	8.61% of the population (1,210,854.977 | +17.69% from 2001 | 943 female 1,000 male inhabitants)
1	Bhil	17,071,049	+34.42 %	16.37 %	980 : 1000	Madhya Pradesh, Gujarat, Rajasthan, Maharashtra, Karnataka, Tripura, Andhra Pradesh, Chhattisgarh
2	Gond	13,256,928	+22.08 %	12.71 %	1004 : 1000	Madhya Pradesh, Chhattisgarh, Maharashtra, Odisha, Uttar Pradesh, Andhra Pradesh u. a. (insg. 11)
3	Santal	6,570,807	+12.55 %	6.30 %	1007 : 1000	Jharkhand, West Bengal, Odisha, Bihar, Assam, Tripura
4	Mina	4,345,528	+14.36 %	4.17 %	919 : 1000	Rajasthan
5	Naikda	3,787,639	+13.23 %	3.63 %	987: 1000	Daman and Diu, Goa, Dadra und Nagar Haveli, Rajasthan, Karnataka, Gujarat, Maharashtra
6	Oraon	3,682,992	+17.21 %	3.53 %	1002 : 1000	West Bengal, Bihar, Maharashtra, Odisha, Jharkhand, Chhattisgarh, Madhya Pradesh
7	Sugalis	2,407,637	+15.87 %	2.31 %	956 : 1000	Andhra Pradesh
8	Munda	2,203,006	+14.85 %	2.11 %	998 : 1000	Jharkhand, Odisha, West Bengal, Chhattisgarh, Tripura, Bihar, Madhya Pradesh
9	Koli Dhor	2,152,540	?	2.06 %	968 : 1000	Maharashtra, Gujarat, Karnataka, Dadra und Nagar Haveli, Odisha, Arunachal Pradesh
10	Naga	1,673,555	−8.10 %	1.60 %	976 : 1000	Nagaland
11	Khond	1,628,501	+16.54 %	1.56 %	1059 : 1000	Bihar, Westbengalen, Jharkhand, Odisha
12	Koli Mahadev	1,459,565	+18.90 %	1.40 %	966 : 1000	Maharashtra
13	Khasi	1,428,745	+25.51 %	1.37 %	1032 : 1000	Meghalaya, Assam, Mizoram
14	Bodo (Boro)	1,361,735	+0.66 %	1.31 %	994 : 1000	Assam
15	Kol	1,263,818	+27.48 %	1.21 %	963 : 1000	Odisha (Orissa), Chhattisgarh, Madhya Pradesh, Maharashtra, Bihar, Jharkhand
16	Varli	1,238,066	+27.00 %	1.19 %	1014 : 1000	Gujarat, Daman and Diu, Dadra und Nagar Haveli, Maharashtra, Karnataka, Goa
17	Kokna	1,076,854	+16.20 %	1.03 %	994 : 1000	Dadra and Nagar Haveli, Gujarat, Maharashtra, Karnataka
18	Gujjar	1,073,201	+34.26 %	1.03 %	922 : 1000	Jammu and Kashmir, Himachal Pradesh
19	Ho	1,033,095	+28.03 %	0.99 %	1020 : 1000	Bihar, Westbengalen, Jharkhand, Orissa
20	Garo	1,000,511	+37.91 %	0.96 %	988 : 1000	Meghalaya, Assam, West Bengal, Nagaland, Mizoram, Tripura
21	Korku	995,823	+28.63 %	0.96 %	961 : 1000	Chhattisgarh, Madhya Pradesh, Maharashtra
22	Kawar	946,672	+16.47 %	0.91 %	1008 : 1000	Odisha (Orissa), Bihar, Jharkhand, Chhattisgarh, Madhya Pradesh, Maharashtra
23	Bhumij	869,653	+13.55 %	0.83 %	993 : 1000	Westbengalen, Jharkhand, Odisha
24	Mizo (Lushai)	747,858	+12.00 %	0.72 %	1023 : 1000	Assam, Manipur, Mizoram, Meghalaya
25	Koya	738,629	+6.70 %	0.71 %	1049 : 1000	Maharashtra, Odisha, Andhra Pradesh, Karnataka
26	Saharia	685,757	+30.12 %	0.66 %	943 : 1000	Madhya Pradesh, Rajasthan, Uttar Pradesh, Chhattisgarh
27	Mising (Miri)	680,424	+15.85 %	0.65 %	968 : 1000	Assam, Arunachal Pradesh
28	Dhodia	680,090	?	0.65 %	1000 : 1000	Gujarat, Daman & Diu, Dadra und Nagar Haveli, Maharashtra, Goa
29	Dubla	675,945	+7.70 %	0.65 %	995 : 1000	Goa, Gujarat, Daman und Diu, Dadra und Nagar Haveli, Maharashtra, Karnataka
30	Halba	650,631	+1.81 %	0.63 %	1013 : 1000	Madhya Pradesh, Chhattisgarh, Maharashtra
31	Rathawa	642,881	+19.91 %	0.62 %	973 : 1000	Gujarat
32	Kolha	625,009	?	0.60 %	1015 : 1000	Odisha (Orissa)
33	Tripuri	592,255	+8.90 %	0.57 %	985 : 1000	Tripura

== See also ==
- List of Scheduled Tribes in Gujarat
- Scheduled Caste and Scheduled Tribe (Prevention of Atrocities) Act, 1989
- Scheduled Castes and Tribes
