= Indo-Aryan peoples =

Ethnolinguistic groups in South Asia

Indo-Aryans
- 1978 map showing geographical distribution of the major Indo-Aryan languages. (Urdu is included under Hindi. Romani, Domari, and Lomavren are outside the scope of the map.) Dotted/striped areas indicate where multilingualism is common. Legend Central Dardic Eastern Northern Northwestern Western Southern

Total population
- ~1.4 billion

Regions with significant populations
- India: Over 1 billion
- Pakistan: Over 180 million
- Bangladesh: Over 195 million
- Nepal: Over 26 million
- Sri Lanka: Over 15 million
- United States: Over 4 million
- United Arab Emirates: Over 3 million
- Turkey: Over 2 million
- Afghanistan: Over 2 million
- United Kingdom: Over 1 million
- Canada: Over 1 million
- Mauritius: Over 812,800
- Romania: Over 569,000
- Trinidad and Tobago: Over 560,000
- Guyana: Over 325,000
- Bulgaria: Over 325,000
- Maldives: Over 300,000
- Fiji: Over 252,000
- Bhutan: Over 240,000

Languages
- Indo-Aryan languages

Religion
- Majority Hindu; Large minority: Muslim, Buddhist, Sikh, Jain, Christian and some non-religious atheist/agnostic

Related ethnic groups
- Other Indo-European-peoples, especially Iranian peoples

Indo-Aryan peoples, also known as Indic peoples in the context of Indo-European studies, are a diverse collection of peoples predominantly found in South Asia, who (traditionally) speak Indo-Aryan languages. Historically, Aryans were the pastoralists who spoke Indo-Iranian languages, migrated from Central Asia into South Asia, and introduced the Proto-Indo-Aryan language.

The early Indo-Aryan peoples were known to be closely related to the Iranian group that have resided west of the Indus River on the Iranian Plateau; an evident connection in cultural, linguistic, and historical ties. Today, the majority of Indo-Aryan speakers are found south of Hindu Kush and east of the Indus, across the modern-day regions of Bangladesh, India, Nepal, Pakistan, Sri Lanka, Maldives, as well as parts of Afghanistan (Kunar).

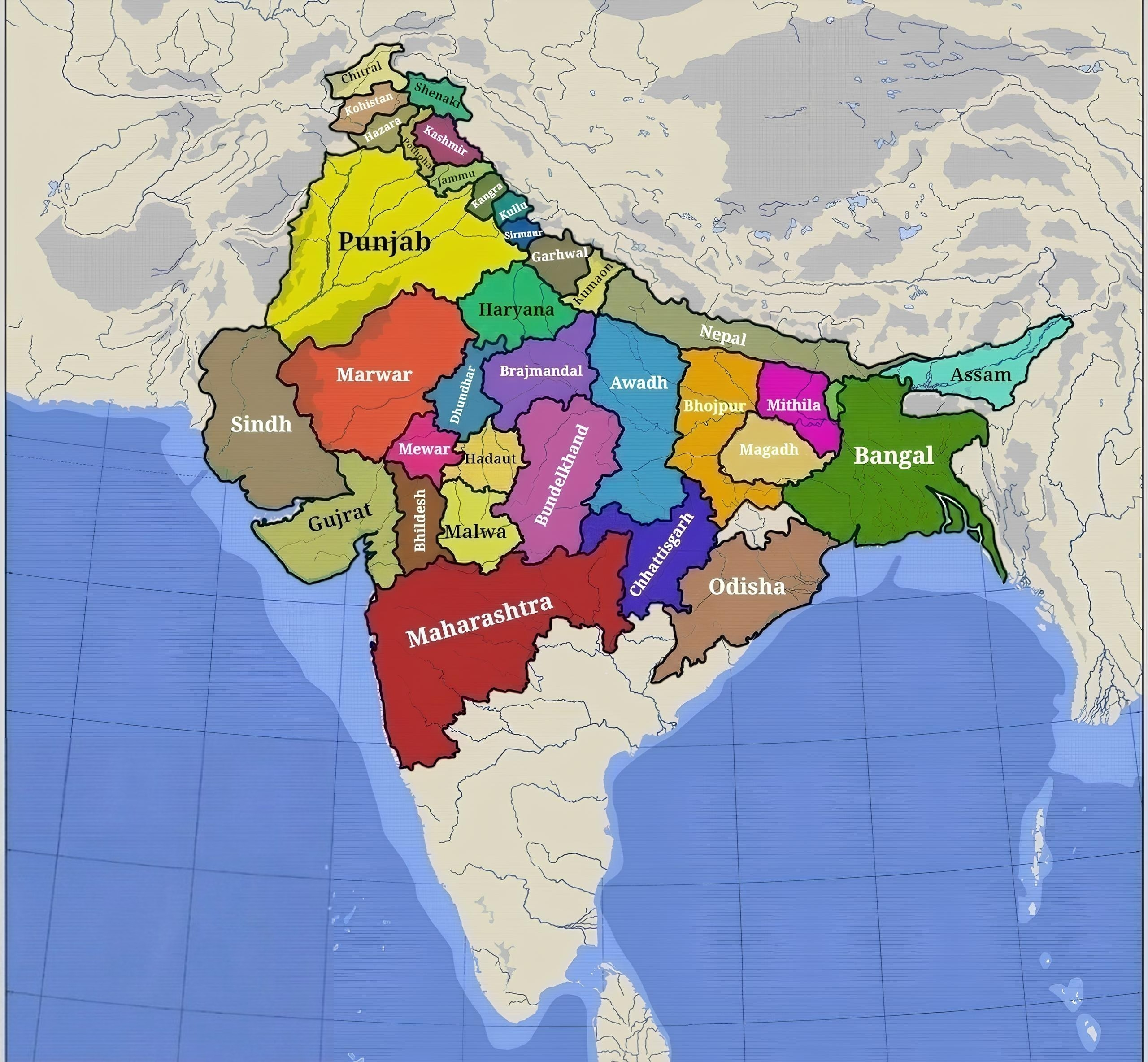
Schematic representation of major ethno-linguistic regions of Indo-Aryan languages.

== History ==
=== Proto-Indo-Iranians ===
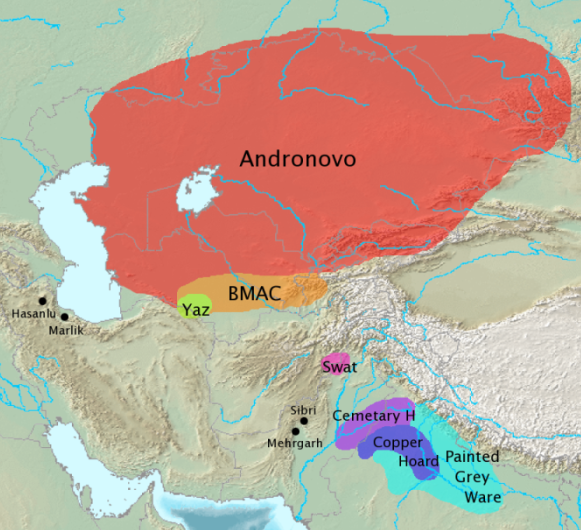
Archaeological cultures associated with Indo-Iranian migrations (after EIEC). The Andronovo, BMAC and Yaz cultures have often been associated with Indo-Iranian migrations. The GGC, Cemetery H, Copper Hoard, OCP, and PGW cultures are candidates for cultures associated with Indo-Aryan migrations.

The introduction of the Indo-Aryan languages in the Indian subcontinent was the outcome of a migration of Indo-Aryan people from Central Asia into the northern Indian subcontinent (modern-day Bangladesh, Bhutan, India, Nepal, Pakistan, and Sri Lanka). Another group of Indo-Aryans migrated further westward and founded the Mitanni kingdom in northern Syria (c. 1500–1300 BC); the other group was the Vedic people. According to Christopher I. Beckwith, the Wusun people of Inner Asia in antiquity could have been of Indo-Aryan origin.

The Proto-Indo-Iranians, from which the Indo-Aryans developed, are identified with the Sintashta culture (2100–1800 BCE), and the Andronovo culture, which flourished ca. 1800–1400 BCE in the steppes around the Aral Sea, present-day Kazakhstan, Turkmenistan, and Uzbekistan. The Proto-Indo-Aryan split off around 1800–1600 BCE from the Iranians, moved south through the Bactria-Margiana Culture, south of the Andronovo culture, borrowing some of their distinctive religious beliefs and practices from the BMAC, and then migrated further south into the Levant and north-western India. The migration of the Indo-Aryans was part of the larger diffusion of Indo-European languages from the Proto-Indo-European homeland at the Pontic–Caspian steppe which started in the 4th millennium BCE. The GGC, Cemetery H, Copper Hoard, OCP, and PGW cultures are candidates for cultures associated with Indo-Aryans.

The Indo-Aryans were united by shared cultural norms and language, referred to as aryā 'noble'. Over the last four millennia, the Indo-Aryan culture has evolved particularly inside India itself, but its origins are in the conflation of values and heritage of the Indo-Aryan and indigenous people groups of India. Diffusion of this culture and language took place by patron-client systems, which allowed for the absorption and acculturation of other groups into this culture, and explains the strong influence on other cultures with which it interacted.

Genetically, most Indo-Aryan-speaking populations are descendants of a mix of Central Asian steppe pastoralists, Iranian hunter-gatherers, and, to a lesser extent, South Asian hunter-gatherers—commonly known as Ancient Ancestral South Indians (AASI). Dravidians are descendants of a mix of South Asian hunter-gatherers and Iranian hunter-gatherers, and to a lesser extent, Central Asian steppe pastoralists. South Indian Tribal Dravidians descend majorly from South Asian hunter-gatherers, and to a lesser extent Iranian hunter-gatherers. Additionally, Austroasiatic and Tibeto-Burmese speaking people contributed to the genetic make-up of South Asia.

Indigenous Aryanism propagates the idea that the Indo-Aryans were indigenous to the Indian subcontinent, and that the Indo-European languages spread from there to central Asia and Europe. Contemporary support for this idea is ideologically driven, and has no basis in objective data and mainstream scholarship.

== List of historical Indo-Aryan peoples ==
=== A ===
- Abhira
- Anga

=== B ===
- Bahlika
- Bharata
- Buli

=== C ===
- Caidya

=== D ===
- Dewa

=== G ===
- Gāndhārī
- Gangaridai
- Gupta

=== K ===
- Kalinga
- Kasmira
- Kekaya
- Khasa
- Kikata
- Koliya
- Kosala
- Kuru

=== L ===
- Licchavi

=== M ===
- Madra
- Magadhi
- Malava
- Mallaka
- Mātsyeya
- Mitanni
- Moriya

=== N ===
- Nāya
- Nishadha

=== O ===
- Odra

=== P ===
- Paktha
- Pala
- Panchala
- Paundra
- Puru

=== S ===
- Salva
- Salwa
- Saraswata
- Sauvira
- Shakya
- Shunga
- Sindhu
- Sudra
- Surasena

=== T ===
- Trigarta

=== U ===
- Utkala

=== V ===
- Vanga
- Vatsa
- Vidarbha
- Videha
- Vrishni

=== Y ===
- Yadavas
- Yadu
- Yaudheya

== Contemporary Indo-Aryan people ==
=== A ===
- Agariya people
- Andh people
- Angika people
- Assamese people
- Awadhi people

=== B ===
- Baiga people
- Bakarwal people
- Banjara people
- Barda people
- Barua people
- Bathudi people
- Bazigar people
- Been people
- Bede people
- Bengali people
- Bharia people
- Bhil people
- Bhojpuri people
- Bhottada people
- Bhoksa people
- Bhuiya people
- Bhunjia people
- Binjhia people
- Bishnupriya Manipuri people
- Bote people
- Bonaz people
- Brokpa people
- Bundeli people

=== C ===
- Chickwa people

=== D ===
- Damoria people
- Danuwar people
- Darai people
- Deccani people
- Deshi people
- Dhakaiya people
- Dhivehi people
- Dhodia people
- Dogra people
- Dom people

=== G ===
- Gaddi people
- Gamit people
- Garhwali people
- Gawri people
- Goalpariya people
- Gujarati people
- Gurjar people

=== H ===
- Halba people
- Halpati people
- Haranashikari people
- Haryanvi people
- Hill Kharia people
- Hindki people

=== J ===
- Jadgal people
- Jatapu people
- Jaunsari people

=== K ===
- Kalash people
- Kamrupi people
- Kashmiri people
- Katkari people
- Kewat people
- Kharwaria people
- Khas people
- Kishtwari people
- Kho people
- Khotta people
- Kohistani people
- Konkani people
- Kumal people
- Kumauni people
- Kutchi people
- Koch Rajbongshi people
- Kokna people
- Koli people
- Kotia people
- Kauravi people

=== L ===
- Lampucchwa Tharu people
- Lasi people
- Lodha people
- Lom people

=== M ===
- Magahi people
- Maithil people
- Majhi people
- Majhwaria people
- Mal Paharia people
- Marathi people
- Marwari people
- Meena people
- Meghwal people
- Memon people
- Mewati people
- Miya people
- Moria people
- Muhajir people

=== N ===
- Nagpuria people
- Nashya Shaikh people

=== O ===
- Odia people

=== P ===
- Pahari people
- Palula people
- Pangwala people
- Panika people
- Parya people
- Pardhi people
- Pashayi people
- Pawra people
- Punjabi people

=== Q ===
- Qhandeshi people

=== R ===
- Rajasthani people
- Rajuar people
- Rana Tharu people
- Rathwa people
- Relli people
- Rohingya people
- Romani people

=== S ===
- Sadan people
- Saharia people
- Sansi people
- Saraiki people
- Sarak people
- Sarazi people
- Saurashtra people
- Shina people
- Sindhi people
- Sinhalese people
- Sounti people
- Surjapuri people
- Sylheti people

=== T ===
- Tadvi Bhil people
- Thari people
- Tharu people
- Tirahi people
- Torwali people

=== V ===
- Vaghri people
- Valmiki people
- Van Gujjar people
- Vedda people (Debated)

=== W ===
- Warli people
- Watal people

== See also ==
- Aryan
- Aryan race
- Āryāvarta
- Proto-Indo-Europeans
- Indo-Iranians
- Dardic languages
- Indo-Aryan languages
- Indo-Aryan migrations
- Indigenous Aryanism
- Dasa
- Dravidian peoples
- Early Indians
- South Asian diaspora
- Northern South Asia
