= Kuwi =

Kuwi may refer to:

- Kuvi or Kuwi, a Dravidian language
- KUWI (FM), a radio station (89.9 FM) licensed to serve Rawlins, Wyoming, United States
