= Eravallan language =

Dravidian language of India

Eravallan
- எரவல்லன்
- Native to: India
- Region: Kerala, Tamil Nadu
- Native speakers: (5,000 cited 2001)
- Language family: Dravidian: Southern; Southern I; Tamil–Kannada; Tamil–Kota; Tamil–Toda; Tamil–Irula; Tamil–Kodava–Urali; Tamil–Malayalam; Tamiloid; Malasa–Eravallan; Eravallan
- Early forms: Old Tamil: Middle Tamil

Language codes
- ISO 639-3: era
- Glottolog: erav1242

Eravallan (IPA: [erɐʋɐlːɐn]) is a tribal Dravidian language related to Tamil. It is spoken by the Eravallan people in Kerala and Tamil Nadu.
