= Koli Mahadev =

Tribal community of Maharashtra

Koli Mahadeo or Koli Mahadev are an indigenous tribal community present in the Sahyadri forest region of Maharashtra. They are also known by the name of Donger Koli, being considered as a sub-caste of Koli.

== Etymology ==
There are two sources regarding the origin of name of the community. It is widely recognized that the community members held Lord Shiva, also called Mahadev in high reverence and later their name deriving from the deity being their chief patron. The other theory states that during the 13th century, few members of the Koli community migrated to the Mahadeo Hills and adjacent area and thereby the name being an econym for the members.

They are also referred by the name of Dongar Koli, which means 'Hill Koli" due to their livelihood in high altitude hilly areas.

== History ==
The community has been primitive to the hilly forest ranges of the Khandesh, with a deep martial history from the times of the Farooqui dynasty. They rose to the prominence during the time of the Maratha War of Independence and heavily participated in the Mughal-Maratha War. They actively participated with the Shivaji and later took the control of the Junnar and Shivneri, and fought against the Adilshahi which later lead to their massacre. They prominently participated in the Siege of Shivneri Fort and were long term allies of the Marathas. During the Maratha Empire, they were given the responsibility for protection of the hill forts as they had tactics of warfare in forested and mountaneous regions.

They were known for their Guerrilla warfare tactics and made dominance upon the neighbouring tribes of the region. During the Anglo-Maratha Wars, they heavily participated from the Maratha side and were later persecuted the Britishers. In the British Raj, many restrictions were imposed upon them due to their participations in the revolts against the Company rule in India and they mobilized other Koli communities such Malhar Koli against the British.

== Culture ==
They have high reverence of Mahadev (Lord Shiva) and believe them as his descendants, with a large part of their culture based upon it. Alongside the worship of Shiva, they also worship their village deities which differs from village to village, a practice similar to the other tribes of the region. Unlike other communities such as Thakar and Kunbis who majorly have male deities, the Koli Mahadeo areas have a prevalence of female deities and their society providing more power to the women.

Their society is divided into 24 clans and they are endogamous with practice of monogamy. They are one of the few tribal society where marriage does not occur at young age, but in the recent times due to economic conditions, many members with financial issues prefer to get their girls married at younger age instead of focusing on their education.

== Present ==
They were recognized as a Scheduled Tribes community in Maharashtra in 1950, as per The Constitution (Scheduled Tribes) Order, 1950. As of 2011 census, their population in the state was 14,59,565 with them being the third largest tribal community in Maharashtra.
