= Gamits =

Gamits may refer to:

- The Gamits, American band
- Gamit, Indian ethnic group
