= Malasar people =

Malasar
- Ethnicity: Dravidian
- Location: Western Ghats
- Population: 9,000 approx
- Language: Malasar
- Religion: Hinduism

Malasar Tribe (Tamil : மலைசர்) are a designated Scheduled Tribe in the Indian states of Karnataka, Kerala, and Tamil Nadu. The Malasar Tribe people are one of the earliest known inhabitants of the Western Ghats, in Anaimalai Hills. Malasar is an unclassified Southern Dravidian language spoken by a Scheduled tribe of India.
