= Rathodia =

The Rathodia are a Hindu caste found in the state of Gujarat in India.

== Origin and present circumstances ==
The Rathodia are sub-division of the Halpati tribe. They are found mainly in the districts of Surat and Baroda. They speak Gujarati and Hindi. The Rathodia are strictly endogamous, but no system of exogamous clans. Most of the Rathodia are landless and work as agricultural labourers. There are only a few small and marginal farmers. Many are victims of bonded labour, and while others collect firewood to supplement their income. They are economically and educationally extremely backward. The Rathodia are Hindu, and their main deities are Naganjimata, Balija maharaj and Ganesh.
