= Tsering Samphel =

Indian politician (born 1948)

Tsering Samphel (born 25 June 1948) is an Indian politician. Samphel supports the now fulfilled demand to give Ladakh Union Territory status.

Tsering Samphel is the son of Sonam Wangyal. He hails from the Boto people. He did his university studies at the Sampurnanand Sanskrit University in Varanasi and the Punjabi University in Patiala. Samphel was one of the key leaders of the Lamdon Social Welfare Society, a social reform group set up in 1969 by Ladakhi youth that had studied in Srinagar. The Lamdon Society sought to challenge the then dominant politicians in Ladakh. Between 1971 and 1987 he served as president and secretary of the Lamdon Model Schools.

In 1987 Samphel was elected to the Jammu and Kashmir Legislative Assembly, standing as the Indian National Congress candidate in the Leh seat. He obtained 16,142 votes (56.39% of the votes in the constituency). Following his tenure as Member of the Legislative Assembly, he served as Leh District Congress Committee president between 1990 and 1996.

He served as the president of the Ladakh Buddhist Association between 1997 and 2004. Between 1987 and 2004 he also served as Executive Director of the Leh Nutrition Project. As LBA president he was a key actor in setting up the Ladakh Union Territory Front. Moreover, he is the founding secretary of the Ladakh Co-operative Transport Society.

In December 2005 he reconstituted the Ladakh unit of the Indian National Congress, thereby challenging the position of the LUTF to be able to represent all Ladakhi Buddhists. This move caused a split in the LBA. He became the president of the Ladakh District Congress Committee.

As of 2012 Samphel was a member of the National Commission for Scheduled Castes and Scheduled Tribes.

On 20 March 2014 the Congress Party declared Samphel is its candidate for the Ladakh Lok Sabha seat in the parliamentary election. He filed his nomination papers on 15 April 2014. His friend turned foe Ghulam Raza lost by 36 votes, the closest margin in the 2014 election, to Thupstan Chhewang of the Bharatiya Janata Party.
