= Any Kuki Tribes =

Category of Scheduled Tribes recognised by India

- A young Kuki couple at the Chapchar Kut celebration in Aizawl, Mizoram

Total population
- 151,503

Regions with significant populations
- India; Assam, Meghalaya, Nagaland, Manipur, Mizoram, Tripura

Languages
- Thadou and other Kuki-Chin languages

Religion
- Predominantly Protestantism (Baptist) and Catholicism; very small minority Judaism (Bnei Menashe)

Related ethnic groups
- Zo people; Chin; Mara; Bnei Menashe; Ranglong; Mizo

Any Kuki Tribes is a category of Scheduled Tribes (ST) in India, recognised in several Northeastern states: Assam, Meghalaya, Nagaland, Manipur, Mizoram and Tripura. In all states except Manipur, the category encompasses all Kuki people (also called Kuki-Zo people).

In Manipur, since 1956, Kuki and Naga people have been recognised under individual tribe names and the old categories 'Any Kuki Tribes' and 'Any Naga Tribes' were removed from the list of Scheduled Tribes. In 2003, 'Any Kuki Tribes' was added again, in order to cover people that do not fall under the listed tribes. In particular, Thadou language-speaking Kukis who do not regard themselves as "Thadous" have been using the 'Any Kuki Tribes' category.

== History ==
In the Constitution (Scheduled Tribes) Order, 1950, the Government of India, listed the categories "Any Kuki Tribes", "Any Mizo (Lushai) Tribes", and "Any Naga Tribes", among others, as Scheduled Tribes (ST) in the state of Assam. These categories covered Kuki people, Mizo people and Naga people respectively. The very same categories were also listed for what were then 'Part C' states (Chief Commissioner's Provinces) of Manipur and Tripura (with some simplifications in the latter). These original categories continue in Assam, as well as the new states carved out of Assam, viz.,Meghalaya, Mizoram and Nagaland. In Manipur, however, special circumstances arose.

=== Manipur ===
When the Backward Classes Commission reviewed the social classes in Manipur in 1953, there were concerted demands by various Kuki groups for separate recognition of language or dialect-based identities as separate tribal categories. Their demands were accepted by the Commission, and in the 1956 modification order, the 'Any Kuki Tribes' and 'Any Naga Tribes' categories were replaced by 28 tribes in Manipur (making a total of 29 along with 'Any Mizo Tribes').

A problem arose in Manipur's classification with regard to 'Thadou', which was listed as one of the 29 "tribes". According to scholars, Thadou is really a clan rather than a tribe. Clans are named after their founders, and the tribal custom dictates that the founder of a clan cannot usurp the legacy of his ancestors or elders. So, the Thadou identity is rejected by clans senior to Thadou (including Lenthang, Lunkim, Changsan, Thangeo, Doungel and others). The 1956 order compelled them to identify as "Thadous" in order to obtain a Scheduled Tribe certificate, which they found objectionable.

After several representations, in 2003, 'Any Kuki Tribes' was reinserted into the ST list of Manipur in order to enable such Thadou language-speaking clans from availing the ST status without having to identify as "Thadou". (Note: There are also objections to the language being named 'Thadou' citing the reason that it was already being spoken prior to the advent of the founder.) Scholar Kham Khan Suan opined that it would have been far better to merge 'Thadou' and 'Kuki' under one common label, such as 'Thadou-Kuki'. Even though people from any tribe under the traditional Kuki umbrella could theoretically identify as 'Any Kuki Tribes', in practice, it is only the Thadou-speaking Kukis that did so. According to the Kuki Tribes Council, (Note: Later known as 'Any Kuki Tribes Council'.) clans such as Doungel, Khongsai, Haokip, Touthang, Baite, Chonghang, Hangmi and Lhungdim adopted the 'Any Kuki Tribes' identity. (Note: Not all Haokips are expected to have adopted 'Any Kuki Tribes' identity. According to Seilen Haokip, roughly half the Haokips regard themselves as 'Thadou' and the other half do not.) In the 2011 census, roughly 28,000 people identified under 'Any Kuki Tribes' compared to 216,000 people that identified as 'Thadou'.

== Distribution ==
People of 'Any Kuki Tribes' are present in all the states of Northeast India except Arunachal Pradesh. As per 2011 census, their distribution is as follows:

State	Population
Assam	33,399
Meghalaya	14,275
Nagaland	18,768
Mizoram	45,774
Tripura	10,965
Manipur	28,342

In the case of Manipur, this number is in addition to other Kuki tribes that are individually categorised as ST. All the Kuki tribes together, also called "Kuki-Zo tribes", total 419,855 people in Manipur.

== Disputes in Manipur ==
The recognition of 'Any Kuki Tribes' as a Scheduled Tribe category in Manipur caused increased competition between the 'Thadou' and 'Kuki' identities. The groups subscribing to these identities have formed separate apex organisations called "Thadou Inpi" (Note: Later called "Thadou Inpi GHQ (General Headquarters)".) and "Kuki Inpi" respectively. They also have separate student bodies, viz., the Thadou Students Association and the Kuki Students' Organisation.

In 2015, Thadou Inpi alleged that the Kuki Inpi was propagating a "unitary concept" of 'Any Kuki Tribes', which it labelled as detrimental to the unity of the Kuki community. It criticised the addition of 'Any Kuki Tribes' to the ST list. In 2021, it called for the deletion of 'Any Kuki Tribes' from the ST list, on the grounds that Kuki is not a "tribe" but a generic term for a number of tribes. It also argued that the addition of 'Any Kuki Tribes' in the ST list violates Article 342 of the Constitution (as interpreted by the National Commission for Scheduled Tribes), which requires "distinct culture, dialect and economic pursuit" for tribe recognition. By 2023, it appeared to moderate its stance, accepting Kuki Inpi Manipur as the apex body responsible for 'Any Kuki Tribes'. However, a rival organisation called "Thadou Inpi Manipur" was created in November 2024, (Note: Thadou Inpi Manipur was formed in November 2024 in the midst of the Manipur conflict, defying the Thadou Inpi GHQ. Despite its name, most of its constituent units are from outside Manipur. It is championed by Michael J. Lamthang, a former leader of the Thadou Students Association and present spokenperson of Manipur's ruling party unit. Its ideology is reflected by the slogan, "Thadou is not Kuki, or underneath Kuki, or part of Kuki".) which took to campaigning against 'Any Kuki Tribes' much more vociferously.

Meanwhile, the Manipur state cabinet under the leadership of chief minister N. Biren Singh, is said to have taken a decision in October 2018 to recommend the deletion of 'Any Kuki Tribes' from the ST list of Manipur. This only came to light three years later, with the Kuki Students' Organisation (KSO) objecting to the move. KSO conducted a bandh (shutdown) on 26–27 March 2021 to protest this decision. There is no information about any action taken in 2018 but, according to an NDTV report, the second cabinet of Biren Singh made the same decision again in 2023 and wrote to the Union Tribal Affairs Ministry asking for deletion of 'Any Kuki Tribes'. (Note: In addition to the deletion of 'Any Kuki Tribes', the state government also requested the replacement of 'Any Mizo Tribes' with 'Mizo' (which was labelled a "correction").) The Tribal Affairs Ministry reportedly responded with queries and a request for a full proposal along with an ethnographic study. The 2023 Manipur violence erupted a few months later, pitting the Meitei and Kuki-Zo communities against each other. In the course of the violence, the Biren Singh government as well as the Meitei community at large accused the Kuki-Zo people of harbouring "illegal immigrants" from Myanmar. The issue of 'Any Kuki Tribes' was also mixed into these claims alleging that these "illegal immigrants" were being put into the category 'Any Kuki Tribes'.

In July 2024, according to NDTV, the state government responded to the queries from the Tribal Affairs Ministry:

- In response to the query as to what would happen to those currently under 'Any Kuki Tribes' if the proposal goes through, the state government said that they would be recognized under the remaining existing list of subtribes. (Note: This appears to take no cognisance of the difficulties with the 'Thadou' identity described by scholars.)
- In response to the query as to which communities were currently covered under 'Any Kuki Tribes', the state government said that it did not collect such information and asked for an exemption, invoking the fact that a similar exemption was granted for the 1956 tribe modification order. It claimed that no sub-tribe was left out when the 1956 order was enacted. (Note: This may not be strictly true, because five more tribes were added since 1956, taking the current list of Scheduled Tribes to 34; in addition to 'Any Kuki Tribes', they include Poumai, Tarao, Kharam and Mate.)

The state government also stated that it saw no need for an ethnographic study since it was not adding a new community to the ST list, but only "removing redundant nomenclature". So it asked for an exemption from ethnographic study. The government explained its reasons for asking for the deletion with the claim that 'Any Kuki Tribes' in the ST list had enabled "illegal immigrants from neighbouring countries" to enlist under this category. It saw this as an issue of "national security".

The Union Tribal Affairs University kept the matter "on hold" due to the "sensitive nature of the prevailing situation" in the state, referring to the ongoing ethnic conflict.

== Bibliography ==
- Haokip, Ngamkhohao (2012), "Politics of Tribe Identity with reference to the Kukis", Journal of North East India Studies, 2 (2): 64–73 – via academia.edu
- Haokip, Seikhogin (2012), "Genesis of Kuki Autonomy Movement in Northeast India", in Thongkholal Haokip (ed.), The Kukis of Northeast India: Politics and Culture, Bookwell, pp. 49–, ISBN 9789380574448
- Haokip, Seilen (2001), Identity, Conflict and Nationalism: The Naga and Kuki Peoples of Northeast India and Northwest Burma (PDF), University of Liverpool
- Haokip, Seilen (2012), "What Price, Twenty Years of Peace in Mizoram (1986–2006): A Kuki Perspective", in Thongkholal Haokip (ed.), The Kukis of Northeast India: Politics and Culture, Bookwell, pp. 89–, ISBN 9789380574448
- Suan, H. K. Khan (2011). "Rethinking 'tribe' identities: The politics of recognition among the Zo in north-east India". Contributions to Indian Sociology. 45 (2): 157–187. doi:10.1177/006996671104500201.
- Touthang, Ngamtinlun (August 2022), "Ethnicity and identity crisis among the tribes of Northeast India: Critiquing the role of language and genealogy", Bhavaveena, 19 (8) – via academia.edu
