= Andh language =

Indo-Aryan language of India

Andh
- आंध ఆంధ
- Native to: India
- Region: Maharashtra, Telangana, Madhya Pradesh
- Ethnicity: Andh
- Native speakers: 100,000 (2007)
- Language family: Indo-European: Indo-Iranian; Indo-Aryan; Southern Zone; Marathi–Konkani; Andh

Language codes
- ISO 639-3: anr
- Glottolog: andh1242

The Andh language, also known as Andhi, is an Indo-Aryan language of the Marathi–Konkani branch spoken by 100,000 Andhs in India.

It appears Andh may be losing ground with many Andhs speaking Marathi at home.
