= Sathupati Prasanna Sree =

Indian linguist

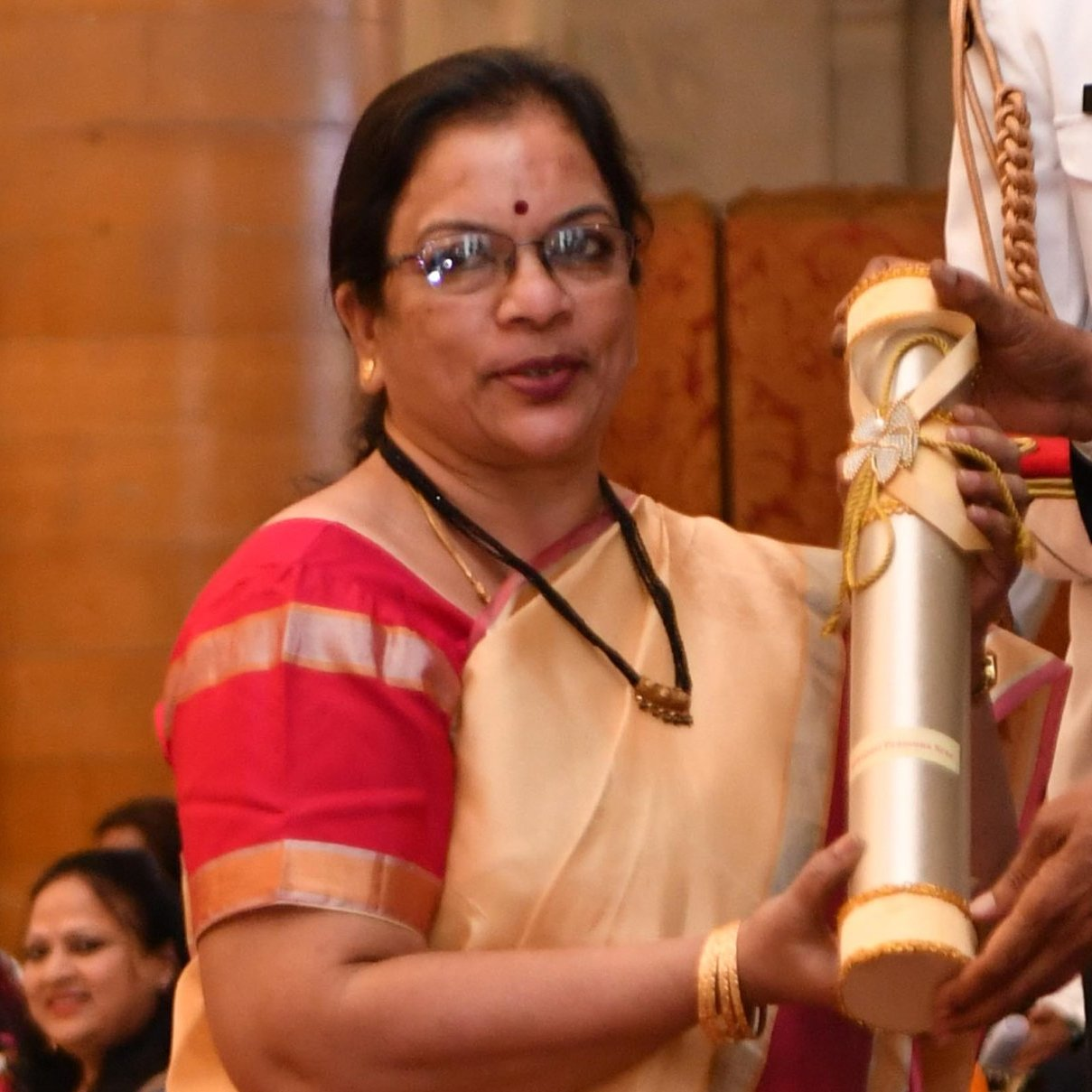
- Nari Shakti Puraskar to Sathupati Prasanna Sree in 2022
- Born: 2 September 1964 (age 62)
- Occupations: Vice Chancellor, Adikavi Nannaya University, Rajamahendravaram, Andhra Pradesh
- Known for: Psychodynamics of the Women in the Post Modern Literature of the East and the West; Shades of Silence; Woman in the Novels of Shashi Deshpande - A Study

Academic background
- Education: Sri Padmavathi Mahila Viswa Vidyalayam, Tirupathi, Andhra Pradesh (PhD), Andhra University (MA), Montessori Mahila Kalasala (BA)

Academic work
- Discipline: English literature, Linguistics
- Sub-discipline: Indian Writing in English, British Poetry
- Institutions: Andhra University, Adikavi Nannaya University

Sathupati Prasanna Sree (born 2 September 1964) is an Indian linguist.

== Early life and education ==
Prasanna Sree was born in 1964 in a Telugu-speaking family but discovered her own tribal roots later in life. This awareness sparked her passion for preserving marginalized languages and cultures. She earned her doctorate in English literature and went on to become a professor at Andhra University.

== Career ==
Sree is Professor of English and Chairperson of the Board of Studies at Andhra University. Throughout her career Sree has worked in preserving minority tribal languages and creating new writing systems for tribal languages within India.

=== Work with tribal languages ===
Recognizing the threat of extinction faced by many tribal languages, Prasanna Sree dedicated her career to their documentation and revitalization. She spent years living and working with various tribal communities across Andhra Pradesh, meticulously studying their languages and cultural practices.

Sree has created writing systems for the Kupia, Koya, Porja, Jatapu, Konda-dora, Gadaba, Kolam, Gondi, Kotia, Savara, Kurru, Sugali, Língua Goudu, Mukhadhora, and Rana languages. She received the Nari Shakti Puraskar on International Women’s Day 2022 from President Ram Nath Kovind.

== Selected works ==
Sree's published writings include:

- Psychodynamics of the Women in the Post Modern Literature of the East and the West
- Shades of Silence
- Woman in the Novels of Shashi Deshpande - A Study
