= Konda Reddis =

The Konda Reddis or Hill Reddis are a designated Scheduled Tribe in the Indian state of Andhra Pradesh and neighboring states of Odisha, and Tamil Nadu.

They are entirely unrelated to the Hindu caste also known by the name Reddy. They live predominantly in the Khammam district, with a smaller number in the Alluri Sitharama Raju and Eluru districts. Konda Reddis are not listed as tribals in the state of Odissa despite the community demand for that status. The Konda Reddis normally speak Telugu with outsiders. The 1991 Census of India counted 432 Hill Reddis..

== Religion ==
The Konda Reddis' traditional religion does not have the concept of a spirit being inside man. However the Reddis worship dead ancestors, the hills, local gods and have accepted Hindu gods.
