= Mukha-Dora language =

Dravidian languages spoken in India

Mukha-Dora
- Native to: India
- Region: Andhra Pradesh
- Native speakers: (30,000, perhaps not as L1 cited 1991 census)
- Language family: Dravidian: Southern; Southern II; Teluguoid; Mukha-Dora

Language codes
- ISO 639-3: mmk
- Glottolog: mukh1238

Mukha-Dora (Nuka-Dora) is one of the Dravidian languages spoken in India. It is spoken by a scheduled tribe, who use Telugu as their primary language. It is spoken by the eponymous Scheduled Tribe in the state of Andhra Pradesh, India.

Sathupati Prasanna Sree has developed a unique script for use with the language.

== Sources ==
- Zvelebil, Kamil (1990), Dravidian Linguistics: An Introduction, Pondicherry Institute of Linguistics and Culture, ISBN 978-81-8545-201-2
