= Garra people =

Community in the Indian Union Territory of Ladakh

The Garra people (sometimes spelled Gara) are a community found in the Indian Union Territory of Ladakh.

== Social status ==
As of 2001, the Garra people were classified as a Scheduled Tribe under the Indian government's reservation program of positive discrimination. As of 2011 Population Census of India, Garra population stands at 504, out of which 275 are males and 229 are females.

== See also ==
- Beda people
