= Halpati =

Halpati, Talavia, Halpati
Regions with significant populations
- India: 675,945
- Gujarat: 643,120
- Maharashtra: 18,697
- Daman and Diu: 11,087
- Dadra and Nagar Haveli: 2,703
- Karnataka: 264
- Goa: 74

Languages
- mainly Dubli and Gujarati

The Halpati are found mainly in the Gujarat state of India. Minor populations are also found in surrounding states and union territories. They are also known as Talvia or Talvi Rathode.

== Origin ==
They get their name from the Hindi agriculture farmer, which means a small farmer. The Halpati claim that they were Rathore Rajputs, who acquired this nickname on account of their taking to cultivation. They are also known as Halpati, which in Gujarati means a cultivator. The Halpati are found in the districts of Surat, Valsad, Bharuch and Vadodara.

In Maharashtra the Halpati also claim descent from the Rathore . They are found mainly in Thane District, and speak Gujarati.

== Present circumstances ==
They are classified as scheduled tribes in 4 states and 2 union territories: Goa, Gujarat, Karnataka, Maharashtra, Dadra and Nagar Haveli and Daman and Diu.

=== In Gujarat ===
The community consist of twenty sub-divisions, the main ones being the Talavia, Rathodia, Vohariya, Damaria, Valsadia, Olpadia, Mandavia, Umberia, Ghanghodia, Khodia, Choria, Ukharia, Baramia, Baria, Narda, Haevia, Thakura, Karcha, Watal, Parsi rathod and Laldatwala rathod. These clans are of equal status, and intermarry, except the Talavia, who consider themselves superior to the other clans on account of their Rajput ancestry. The Halpati speak Gujarati.

The Halpati are marginal cultivators and landless agricultural labourers. They also possess buffaloes, cows and goats and are often involved in selling milk, which is a subsidiary occupation. A small number are petty traders, and are often village shopkeepers. Many Halpati have also moved to Surat and Ahmadabad, where they are employed in the diamond cutting industries.

=== In Maharashtra ===
Halpati society consists of several endogamous sub-divisions which do not marry. Some of their sub-divisions include the Bhahmaniya, Garasia, Karcha, Mandvia, Ratjod, Rajput, and Taravia. Their primary occupation is agriculture. The community is divided between small landowners and landless agricultural labourers. They are Hindu, and customs similar to neighbouring tribal communities such as the Dhodia and Warli.
