= Kammara =

Ancient blacksmiths in the state of Karnataka in India

Regions with significant populations
- Karnataka

The Kammara are blacksmiths since ancient times, situated in the state of Karnataka in India.

The name Kammāra/kammar (in Prakrit/pali/kannada) / Karmāra (in Sanskrit) means a smith, artist, mechanic, craftsman, sculptor, blacksmith; a maker of tools and weapons (Mar. śikalagāra); ततः सन्धाय विमलान् भल्लान् कर्मारमार्जितान् (tataḥ saṃdhāya vimalān bhallān karmāramārjitān). Since Vedic times they are masters in metallurgy and craftsmanship. Owing to their usefulness they were held in great esteem by the people and king alike. They worship Kali and Vishwakarma. Their services were in great demand by everyone since ancient times, from making weapons for kings and soldiers to making tools and equipment for building temples, and also to the farmers, whose agricultural implements have to be made and constantly repaired.

Recently, most members have given up their traditional occupations and have resorted to other jobs. It is noted in the Bellary Gazetteer that "until recently the manufacture of the huge shallow iron pans, in which the sugar-cane [juice] is boiled, was a considerable industry at Kāmalāpuram. The iron was brought by pack bullocks from Jambunath Konda, the dome-shaped hill at the Hospet end of the Sandūr range, and was smelted and worked by men of the Kammara community. Of late years, the cheaper English iron has completely ousted the country product, the smelting industry is dead, and the Kammaras confine themselves to making and mending the boilers with English material. They have a temple of their own, dedicated to Kāli, in the village, where the worship is conducted by one of themselves." The name Baita Kammara, meaning outside blacksmiths, is applied to Kamsala blacksmiths, who work in the open air or outside a village."*

- Madras Census Report, 1901.
