= Naikda =

Indian scheduled tribe

The Naikda are a scheduled tribe community found in the states of Gujarat and Rajasthan in India. In Maharashtra, the Naikda are also called Katkari, which is derived from the word kathori, which means animal skins.

== History and origin ==
The Naikda are found mainly in Surat district of South Gujarat. They trace common ancestry from the Dhodia, another tribal community found in the region, two communities claim descent from two brothers, the Naikda from Rupa Khatri, and the Dhodia from Dhana Khatri. According to some sources, the word naikda is derived from the word naik, which means a commander. They were said to have once been soldiers in the armies of the local rajahs.

== Present circumstances ==
The Naikda speak Naiki, a dialect which is a mixture of Marathi and Gujarati. Land is the major source of the Naikda community. The community are a combination of land owning and landless, with many now working in industry in the nearby city of Surat. These Nayaka in Rajasthan claim that they are related to the Bhils.

The Naikda still practice child marriage, with boys marrying at 16 to 18 years and girls at 12 to 14 years. They most commonly practice monogamy, though polygyny is not prevalent and divorce is permitted on the grounds of infertility, adultery or mental illness of either the husband or wife. After divorce the custody over the children is most commonly given to the father. Widow remarriage is allowed and called pat, though a ceremony is only done at night or in some cases not at all.

== Related groups ==
- Dhodia
- Nayakas
- Nayak
