= Eravallan people =

Regions with significant populations
- Kerala

Languages
- Eravallan language

Related ethnic groups
- Dravidians, Malayalis, Tamils

The Eravallan are an indigenous community regionally referred as Adivasi, and also king of tribes a designated Scheduled Tribe in the Indian state of Kerala. They are an aboriginal tribe whose traditional way of life has been based on hunting and gathering.

Eravallan people believe in Hinduism and speak the Eravallan language.
