= Beda people =

Community in Ladakh, India

The Beda people are a community of the Indian Union Territory of Ladakh. They are mostly found in different parts Ladakh, where they practise their traditional occupation of musicianship. They are predominantly followers of the Muslim faith, although some are Buddhists. According to some scholars, they are an untouchable group, although others think that the situation is more nuanced.

== Social interactions ==
The Beda live mostly in villages of the Ladakh region of Jammu and Kashmir state. (Note: The various scheduled tribes of Jammu and Kashmir state are numerically very dominant in the Ladakh and Kargil districts, although they comprise a very small part of the overall population of the state.) They share these villages with communities that are considered to be socially superior, such as the Ladakhi, Gara and Mon peoples.

The Beda have virtually no input in the socio-political decisions relating to their villages. Kim Gutschow, who is a professor of religion, says that they are considered to be untouchables by other communities in the region, but the anthropologist Rann Singh Mann notes that the practices of social exclusion, submission to superiors and suchlike are not as rigid as can be found in other caste societies; for example, they are permitted to share the same sources of drinking water as the other communities. Writing in 2002, Mann also said that "untouchability and some other caste prejudices are still missing" among the Buddhists in Ladakh society generally, although that might change as they become increasingly exposed to the caste mores found in other areas of India.

The traditional occupation of the Beda is that of musicianship, with their preferred instrument being either the flute or the drum. (Note: The anthropologist Rann Singh Mann contradicts himself regarding the Bedas' preferred musical instrument, listing it as the flute in 1996 and variously as that or the drum in 2002. A typographical error in the latter publication may be to blame.) In their role as musicians they are paid both with money and with food; the latter is often of a particular type for a given occasion, such as Sattu, grain or salt. Music at festivals and events celebrating such things as crop sowing, births and marriage are an important part of Ladakh culture but when not engaged in those, the Beda, who are mostly landless, work as agricultural labourers. A few, who are generally Buddhists and live in tents, make their living as itinerant beggars and are also known as Chankans.

As with the other social groups with whom they share village life, the Beda are expected to be an endogamous community. Marriages outside of their own group are not usually recognised and connubial relationships of this sort are generally co-habitation arrangements, with the woman usually being from the higher-ranked group. If a Ladakhi man forms a marriage-like relationship with a Beda woman then he is ostracised by his own community until such time as the relationship is regularised through the performance of the Chhomo Gango ceremony. The ceremony requires the man to spend 15–20 days bathing in the holy waters of the Ganges river.

== Religion ==
Some of the Beda people are Buddhists, although most are Muslim. Despite the Buddha himself being opposed to the idea of caste, their social status is such that they are not allowed to join Buddhist monastic orders as monks or nuns. According to Mann, this and the other aspects of social deprecation is probably because the "numerical strength and personal convenience" of the Ladakhi people "seems to have had an edge over [Buddhist] cultural traits".

The Muslims among the Beda people tend to bury their dead, whilst the remainder prefer to cremate. The rules of communal interaction require that the dead are carried only by community members or those of a lower social group, which effectively means that the Bedas alone perform that duty for their own people because there is no lower group; while they could do the same for, say, a dead Ladakh person, a Ladakh does not carry a dead Beda person except in extremely rare and unusual situations.

== Official recognition ==
A survey recorded 319 Buddhist members.

The Beda use a minority language that is not officially recognised by the Government of India. They write using the Bodhi script.
