= Sounti =

Ethnic group of Odisha

Total population
- 112,803 (2011, census)

Regions with significant populations
- Odisha
- Keonjhar: 72,752
- Mayurbhanj: 28,677
- Nabarangapur: 3,898
- Khordha: 3,269
- Baleswar: 2,042
- Ganjam: 1,069

Languages
- Odia language

Religion
- Hinduism

Related ethnic groups
- Bhuiya, Bathudi

The Sounti (also spelled as Saunti) are an Indo-Aryan ethnic group found mainly in the Kendujhar and Mayurbhanj districts of Odisha . The 2011 census showed their population to be around 112,803. They are classified as a Scheduled Tribe by the Indian government.

== Demography ==
According to 2011 census, the Sounti population is 112803 with a sex ratio of 1023. Their literacy rate is 59.58%. Most of the sounti speak a dialect of Odia

Historical population of Sounti tribe
Year	Pop.	±%
1961	44,490	—
1971	55,178	+24.0%
1981	67,872	+23.0%
1991	96,251	+41.8%
2001	92,734	−3.7%
2011	112,803	+21.6%
Source: Census of India

== History ==
According to the Mayurbhanj State Census Report of 1931, the Sounti caste emerged in the 17th century under the leadership of Joygobinda Das from Puri. The census further states that Das arrived in Kendujhar from Puri in 1603 C.E. and was granted permission to settle in the village of Mananta in Kendujhar. After relinquishing his original caste, he is believed to have established this new caste. The newly formed caste consisted of individuals who had been marginalized from other castes and were allowed by the ruler of Kendujhar state to settle in Mananta. Over time, their numbers increased as they readily accepted other outcasts. The name of the caste, in the Odia language, literally means "gathered in," highlighting their origins as a group that gathered together with other outcasts. The Scheduled Castes and the Scheduled Tribes Lists (Modification) Order of 1956 refers to them as Sounti, while the 1931 Mayurbhanj Census mentions them as Saunti. Some members, due to difficulties in pronunciation, may refer to themselves as Samuli or Samti.

=== Social structure ===
The Sounti people come under one totemic gotra (killi), Nageswar (cobra), and are divided into a number of exogamous patri-lineages (bansa) like: Aguan Sinha, Anukulia, Apat, Atala, Badam, Baghasinha, Bahabalindra, Baliposia, Banapadia, Bansmulia, Baradia, Bebarta, Behera, Betjharia, Chipindia, Chowdhury, Dakua, Dala Behera, Dalai, Dalai Mahapatra, Bhala Bhai, Bhuinya Mahapatra, Bhujabala, Bhuri Bisai, Biswal, Budhipat, Chatarpania, Daldashia, Danakulia, Dandapat, Dandasena, Das, Dehuri, Desa Dakua, Ghulakundia, Dhangad, Foudakar, Ganabarai, Gharapua Mahapatra, Giri, Gobargadia, Gumanaganjan Singh Berdhajal Mahapatra, Hati, Hatiram, Jadipadia, Jalpadia, Jhapat Sinha, Kalapadia, Kalapal, Kapandia, Kargi, Khamadiha, Khamalia, Khamrai, Khanda, Khandapatra, Kialia, Kuabasia, Kulapadia, Kundalia, Kusmalia, Mahapatra, Malik, Mangal Puria Mardaraj Mahapatra, Miriga Khojia, Mudi, Narendra, Nayak, Nuagadia, Nuakulia, Nungalia, Padhan, Palta Sinha, Pangia, Paramanik, Parida, Putulia, Sarubalia, Satrusala, Raipadia, Sankhalua, Saradia, Sarpat, Sarpuria, Saru, Sindura Roy, Sindurgaria, Sinha, Tainsiria, Talsarua, Tandakar, Tangania, Tangiria, Tarania, Tinti, and they generally use Biswal, Dalai, Dehuri, Naik, Poida, Pradhan as their surnames.

== Culture ==
In Sounti settlements, the family structure is patrilineal and monogamous, with rare polygamy. Marriage is arranged through negotiation with a mandatory bride price. Remarriage is allowed for widows, widowers, and divorcees. Junior Levirate and Sororate marriages are permitted. After childbirth, a 21-day period of Birth pollution is observed, and in case of a community member's death, cremation and burial practices are followed, with a 10-day period of death pollution for the bereaved family.

Sounti society follow Hinduism, worship Hindu gods and goddesses and observe some of the Hindu festivals and rituals. However they have some animist beliefs as well. They worship village deities like Thakurani and Mangala and other Hindu deities like Siva and Raghunath. They have a traditional priest called Dehury.

They live in multi-ethnic villages but maintain separate hamlets from other groups. Single ethnic Sounti villages are uncommon. They live mostly in small houses with two rooms with spacious verandahs in the front. Cattle shed and shed for de-husking rice are built close to the house. Stringed Charpoys and mats made of date-palm leaves, Bell-metal and aluminium utensils are most common household goods.

Men use dhoti. Women wear saree. Financially well off section of the community use undergarments otherwise it is rare. Tattooing is not popular.

The Sounti have their own traditional community council headed by village chief and influential elders. It settles family disputes and acts as guardian of traditional norms and customs.

The main source of income in the Sounti society is farming, livestock rearing and forestry. Many Sountis work as farm labourers .
