= Mannerwarlu =

The Mannervarlu is a tribal community native to the Indian state of Maharashtra. They are mainly located on the border regions of Maharashtra and Telangana, primarily in the Nanded district and Hingoli district of Maharashtra. They speak dialects of the Marathi and Telugu languages with adopted Hindi and Urdu words.

== Culture ==
The Mannervarlu has a distinct culture and customs. Thy celebrate festivals such as Nagpanchami, Dasara, and Diwali. Local deities include Bijjamma Mata Mandir, near DYSP office, Hingoli, Pochamma and the goddess Yellamaincluding Bijamma mata situated exactly in front of Chaudhary petrol pump Hingoli. The Mannervarlu people also worship the Pandavas, the five acknowledged sons of Pandu from the Mahabharata. Unlike other tribes that were protected by either dense forest or hills, their region's plain topography along with large-scale deforestation during and after the reign of Nizam of Hyderabad left the tribe exposed to outside influences.

One custom is the offering of a goat or sheep to the local Goddess on the occasion of births, weddings, and other big events. The ceremony takes place at the "ancestral temple" which is dedicated to the Goddess and normally situated inside the house of a tribal elder.

== Economy ==
The Mannervarlu were forest hunter-gatherers. Later, men worked as guides on tiger-hunting expeditions for the British in colonial times and for Nizam. Many became farm laborers, tenant farmers, and marginal farmers. Those who live near remaining forest areas gather and trade medicinal plants and forest produce. However, the majority of men travel to West Maharashtra and Hyderabad for work and employment. Educated community members often became government officials. Balanna Ramanna Ratnalu (Dhamniwale) Hingoli were the great forefathers and their relation expanded among the Mannervarlu, mainly in Pune, Nagpur, Akola, Nagar, Khamgaon, Nanded District, Jalna, Aurangabad, Yavatmal, Akola, Washim, Kopargaon, Shirdi, and Hyderabad.

== Names ==
Typical surnames include:

- Aakule
- Andelwar
- Ambatwad
- Abulkod
- Akula
- Annelwar
- Aguwad
- Aspat
- Akulwar
- Aloorkar
- Ambulgekar
- Annamwad
- Arsewad
- Bachewad
- Bachrallu
- Badalwad
- Badamkar
- Byagalwar
- Bainwad
- Basapure
- Bodemwad
- Bode
- Bodhgire
- Bollalu
- Chabilwad
- Charke
- Chatalapalli
- Chatlawar
- Chatlod
- Chitale
- Chukewa
- Dasare
- Donkalwar
- Gadapod
- Gyaral
- Gandapwar
- Gurle
- Helchal
- Hingawar
- Ingewad
- Jethewad
- Kaletwad
- Kamtewad
- Kanchatwad
- Kantewad
- Kasewad
- Kaslod
- Kaudewar
- Kaypalwad
- Kolewad
- Komwad
- Komatwar
- Kondarwar
- Kondra
- Kondawar
- koskewad
- Koneri
- Korvi
- Kurewar
- Lakkamwad
- Lolapod
- Mungod
- Machewa
- Mamilwad
- Mamlekar
- Marakwad
- Menthewad
- Mhaisanwad
- Mitke
- Mundkar
- Mungod
- Mupade
- MUPPALWAD
- Mutyalu
- Nagamwad
- Narawad
- Naidu
- Nallewad
- Nalmelwar
- Nandile
- Naramwar
- Palepwad
- Pallewad
- Parodwad
- Pedewad
- Perke
- Pillay
- Piratwad
- Polsane
- Ponganty
- Puppalu
- Pupalwad
- Ramod
- Ratnallu (Bagichewale)
- Ratnalu
- Raulwar
- Rautwad
- Sallawar
- Sanpawar
- Sathewad
- Sirsewad
- Shettiwar
- Shirgurwar
- Shirsetwar
- Shivangaonkar
- Suddulwar
- Sukre
- Samarthwad
- Thakarwad
- Tiparse
- Totawad/Totewad
- Tummod
- Undratwad
- Ungratwad
- Vithallu
- Wallamwad
- Yammalwad
- Yerawad
- Jayewar
- Biramwar
- Gattuwar
- Narawad
- Kumarwad
- Poradwar
- Gangulwad
- Konerwar
- Sunkewar
- Kotpet
- Mamilwad
- Upparla/Uppod
- Kolkondwad
- Nathi
- Jakkal
- Madikunt
- Tambaku
- Tote
- Kunte
- Jaya
- Poppal

== History ==
Tribal history suggests that they organized themselves to resist the integration of Hyderabad State into India by fighting the Razakars, who were a private militia led by Qasim Razvi to support the rule of Nizam Osman Ali Khan, Asaf Jah VII.

- Shrimant Tukaramji Mupade was the Jahagirdar of Ner, Jalna former Aurangabad district Jahagir in Nizam State belonging to this community.
