= Boto people =

The Bot or Boto people are a tribal community found in the union territory of Ladakh. They are the largest tribal community in Ladakh, comprising the largest group of Ladakhis.

According to 2011 Census of India, their population stands at 91,495. They have a male to female sex ratio of 1020 and child sex ratio of 957. They boast a literacy rate of 70.3, which is higher than state tribal literacy rate of 50.6. Botos primarily follow Buddhism.

== Social status ==
As of 2001, the Boto people were classified as a Scheduled Tribe under the Indian government's reservation program of positive discrimination.

== Famous people ==
Indian politician Tsering Samphel is a member of the Boto people.
