= Jatapu people =

The Jatapu people are a designated Scheduled Tribe in the Indian states of Andhra Pradesh and Odisha. The Jatapus are an Adivasi tribe and are traditionally pastoral farmers. Through acculturation the Jatapus speak Odia and Telugu and have in many ways adopted the culture of the surrounding Odia people and Telugu people. There were over one million Jatapus in 1991. Jatapu people were earlier primarily forest dwellers and were evidenced in the hill areas in Vizianagaram district particularly in the Mandals of GL Puram (Gumma Lakshimipuram), Kurupam and Komarada along with their populations present in the neighbouring state of Odisha with populations residing in the Rayagada and Gajapati districts. Some of the alternate and interchangeable names by which the Jatapu are also known as are Chatriya; Jadapu; Jatapu Dora; Khond; Kui Dora; Kuvinga; Pandara Kula; Samanthula; जातापू They largely speak in Kuvi amongst themselves and also are users of the Odia, Telegu languages to communicate with local communities.

== Housing & Settlement Layout ==
It is noted that their ancient housing construction consists of forest wood and mud walls, but this practice is largely reduced due to introduction/implementation of government housing programmes in agency areas and pucca houses were constructed where road connectivity is available. A traditional Jatapu home and settlement can be described as a village consisting of mud houses lined in rows. The homes are joined to each other with common outer walls and a thatched roof. There are usually four separate rooms in each house to provide privacy. The homes have very few possessions, mainly earthen pots, baskets for grains, and mats for sitting. There is no bedding material; they stay warm in the winter by burning fires.The village street serves as a courtyard and playground. Cattle are either kept in sheds or tied to posts in the middle of the streets to avoid cattle theft. They always keep their streets tidy.

== Economy, Agriculture & Commercial activity ==
The Jatapu farmers like many neighbouring tribes in the hill tracts of Andhra Pradesh & Odisha also practice Shifting cultivation (Podu Chasa) is their main occupation and grow Rice, Red Gram, Ragi, Jowar, Bajra, Tobacco, beans, chillies and millets among other crops. Having a staple diet based on Rice, Ragi malt, Mango seed malt and other vegetables. Fish, beef and pork are also part of their diet. They maintain and procure minor forest products like Tamarind, Gum, Hill brooms, Fire wood, and sell those products in weekly markets and purchase essential commodities for daily consumption. A few Jatapu sell pottery, baskets, or bangles, but very few work as craftsmen. They generally do not spin, weave, make pottery, or work as carpenters.

== Notable people ==
1. Ramachandra Ulaka (Indian politician & elected law maker)
2. Saptagiri Sankar Ulaka (Indian politician & elected law maker)
