= Paddari (tribe) =

Tribal community of Jammu and Kashmir

The Paddari (or Padari) are a Western Pahari speaking tribal community in Jammu and Kashmir, who are isolated in the Paddar region of Kishtwar. They speak Padari language and derives their name from the language and their region. In 2024, the Government of India granted them Scheduled Tribe status, along with Gadda Brahmin, Koli and Pahari people.

As of 2011, their population in the state of Jammu and Kashmir was 21,548 with majority of them following Hinduism, followed by Buddhism and Islam.

The community is primarily engaged in agricultural activities, though because of geographical isolation and lack of infrastructure many members of the community had migrate to Jammu and neighbouring areas in search of jobs and livelihood. The community has a social hierarchy of caste with upper castes comprising Brahmins and Rajputs, middle castes such as Kumhars, Badhayi and Sunars, and lower castes being communities such as Doms, Bajgi and Watal. However, the caste system is not rigid in their society and depends upon occupation.
