= Yenadis =

Scheduled Tribe of Andhra Pradesh, India

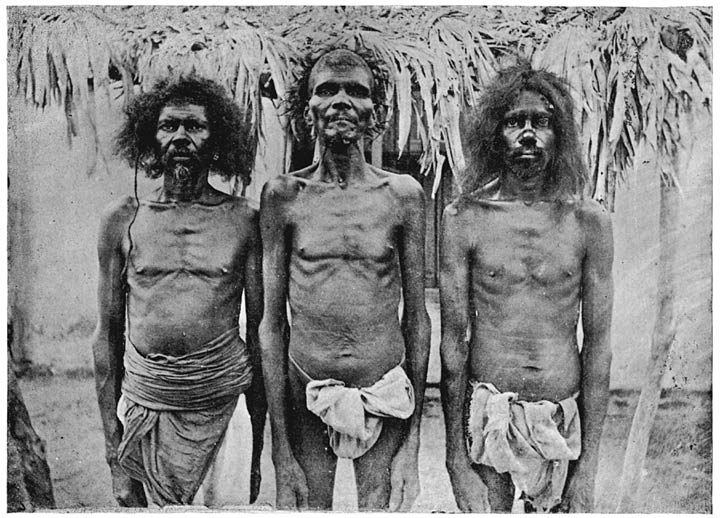
Group of Yenadi men

The Yenadis, also spelled Yanadis, are one of the Adivasi, recognised as a Scheduled Tribe of India. They live in the Nellore, Chittoor and Prakasam districts of Andhra Pradesh. The tribe is divided into three subgroups: the Manchi Yanadi, Adavi Yanadi, and Challa Yanadi.

Yenadis are the largest tribal group in Andhra Pradesh. In 2011, the Yenadi population was 537,808. The Yenadis speak a dialect of Telugu.

== Origin ==
Yanadhi is a corruption of the word "Andati" (Aborigines), meaning "having no beginning."form. Edgar Thurston speculated their name was derived from the Sanskrit anadi, 'without origin.' Some claim to be the original inhabitants of their region, others claimed to be descended from the Chenchus. At the time a local tradition claimed they had provided food for a saint a long time before, who had taught them how to drive out snakes from their area.

== Lifestyle ==
At the turn of the 20th century, the Reddi Yanadis were cooks in Reddy households, who didn't mingle with other subsections of the tribe. Others followed a hunter-gatherer lifestyle, and occasionally were employed as watchmen. The Yenadis ate forest fauna and gathered fruits of the forest. They have immense knowledge of the surrounding forests, flora, fauna, and herbs.

The Yenadis used to live on Sriharikota, which later became an ISRO launch site. They traditionally lived in conical huts through which adults had to squat to enter. Widows, especially those with more husbands, were respected as judges of adultery and other crimes. They practiced polygamy, and a Yenadi man was recorded to have seven wives.
