= Brokpa, Drokpa, Dard and Shin =

Group of Tribes

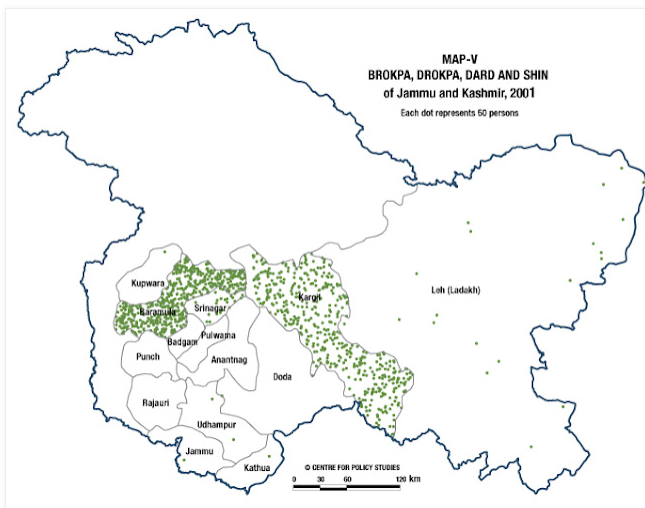
Population map of Brokpa, Drokpa, Dard and Shin (Schedule Tribes of India) in 2001

Brokpa, Drokpa, Dard and Shin is a category of Scheduled Tribes under the Indian constitution.

The category contains tribes who speak Dardic languages. In the regions of Jammu and Kashmir and Ladakh, these tribes are mostly found in the Kargil and Baramulla districts and few of them are found in Leh. They are predominantly Muslim and a few are Buddhists and Hindus.

In the Census of India, the demographic numbers of the "Brokpa, Drokpa, Dard, and Shin" Tribes are added together. Dards is the collective name for this group. Following are the Tribes under the category:

1. In Baramullah
  1. Dards of Baramulla, they are known as Shina people.
2. In Ladakh
  1. The Dards of Drass valley. They are known as Shina people.
  2. Brokpa, the Dards of Dha hanu region, they are known as Minaro people.

== Demographics ==
In the Census of India, the demographic numbers of the "Brokpa, Drokpa, Dard, and Shin" Tribes are added together. Dards is the collective name for this group.

The 2001 Census of India counted 51,957 people in these tribes. Of these, 26,066 people lived in Baramulla, 23,418 in Kargil, 1,002 in Leh and 1,199 in Srinagar. Of the 48,400 counted in 2011, 45,100 were Muslim, 3,144 were Buddhist and 133 were Hindu.

== Jammu and Kashmir ==
=== Dards of Baramulla ===
The Dard-Shin tribe or Shina people is found in Gurez and Tulail in Baramullah. Gurez valley is home to a distinct Shina-speaking Dard tribe who have been cut off from their mainland Astore, Gilgit, and Chilas by the Line of Control. They speak the Astori dialect of Shina language.

== Ladakh ==
=== Dards of Drass ===
Drokpa (Shin) Tribe in Drass valley in Kargil: They are Muslim Dards known as Drokpa or Shin which is found in the Drass region of Kargil. They are also known as the 'Shin' because of their language, 'Shinna,' which is part of the Dard group of languages in the non-Sanskritic Indo European family. They are also believed to have come from the Dardistan. Despite professing the Sunni faith, they maintain certain customs brought with them from their original home. They speak the Astori dialect of Shina language.

=== Dards of Dha Hanu ===
Brokpa or Minaro: Brokpa or Minaro are Buddhist Dards and they speak Brokskat language. They are found in the Aryan valley region. They call themselves "Minaro", while Ladakhis call them Brokpa or Dokhpa. According to the 1991 census of India, there were 1,920 Brokpa. They speak the Brokskat or Minaro language which comes under the Eastern Dardic language group. Minaro practise two religions; one is their traditional "Minaro" religion (spirit worship). The other is Tibetan Buddhism.

== Name ==
These Scheduled Tribes are called a "group of Dardic Tribes" under Scheduled Tribes of the former Jammu and Kashmir. However, there are other non-tribal Dardic people in the state, such as the Kashmiri. According to the most recent research, the term "Dardic" is not linguistic nor ethnic; it is only a suitable geographical expression used to officially choose the Indo-Iranian language that retains the archaic characteristics that are spoken in the north-western Himalayas and in the Hindu Kush. There is no ethnic unity among the speakers of these languages. The languages also cannot be traced to a single linguistic tree model.
