= Andh people =

Scheduled Indo-Aryan Tribe of Central and Southern India

Andh
आंध ఆంధ
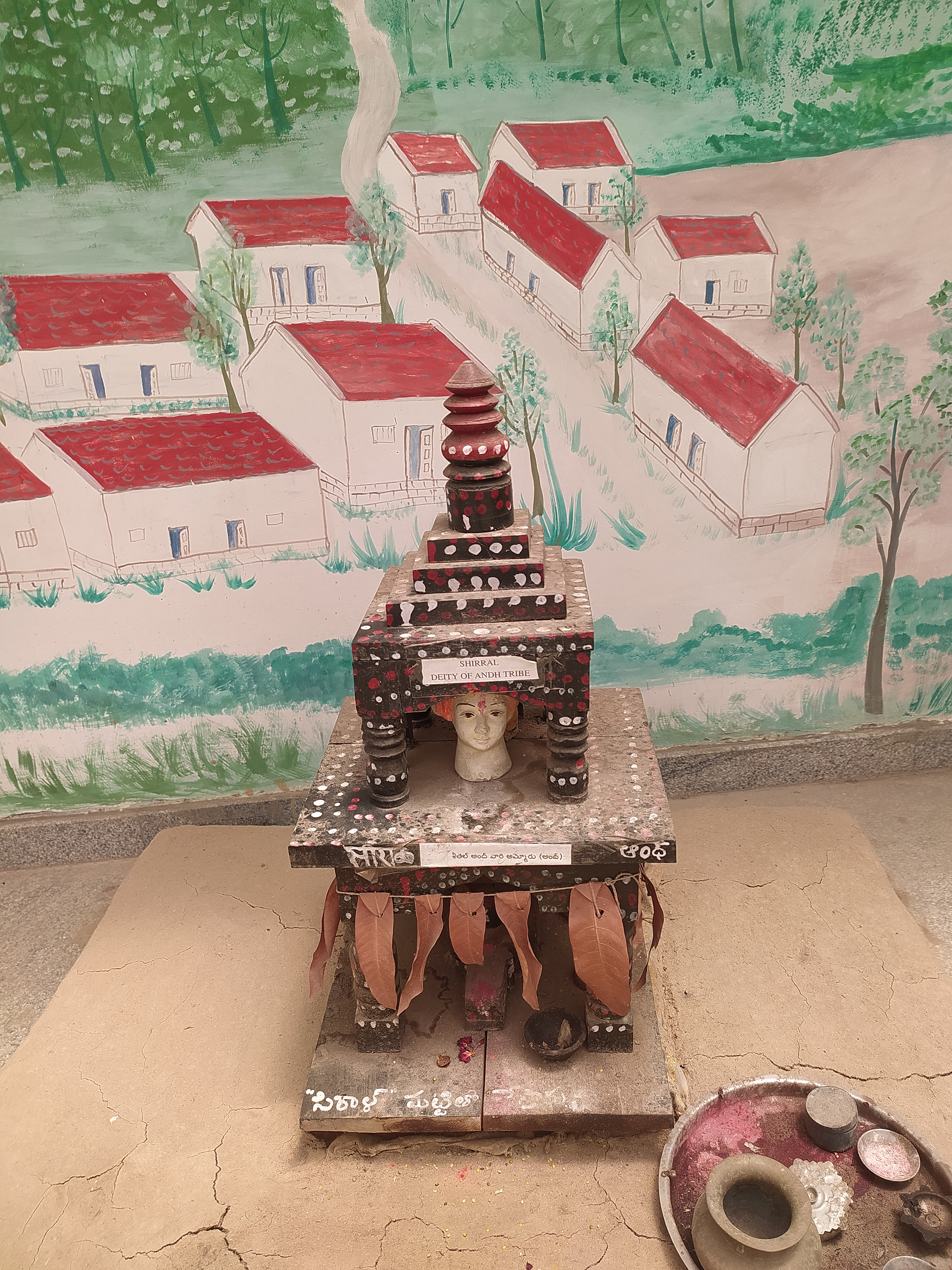
- Deity statue of the Andh tribe at Jodeghat Tribal Museum, Telangana

Total population
- ~493,450

Regions with significant populations
- India
- Maharashtra: 478,000
- Telangana: 13,000
- Karnataka: 1,300
- Andhra Pradesh: ~300
- Madhya Pradesh: ~300
- Gujarat: ~200
- Delhi: ~200
- Chhattisgarh: ~70
- Dadra and Nagar Haveli and Daman and Diu: ~40
- Kerala: ~20
- Goa: ~20

Languages
- Andh (Native); Marathi, Telugu

Religion
- Hinduism

Related ethnic groups
- Other Indo-Aryan peoples

The Andh are a designated Scheduled Tribe in the Indian states of Maharashtra, Telangana and Andhra Pradesh. They are one of the oldest communities in India. They call themselves Tribals and are relatively well-educated.

== History ==
The Andh people are believed to have originated from the ancient Satavahana dynasty, also known as the Andhra dynasty, which ruled parts of southern and central India between the third century BCE and the second century CE. At the time of Satavahana rule, the king was considered the owner of the lands and forests, but after the death of the last Satavahana ruler, the East India Company eventually took control of all lands and forests under its governance, contributing to the Andh becoming isolated and economically stagnant in later centuries. It is possible that the name Andh is a corruption of the Sanskrit "Andhra", a designation given by ancient Aryans to a tribe living in the Andhra region.

The Satavahana clan is said to have established one of the earliest empires in the Deccan, and their inscriptions were in the Maharashtri variant of Prakrit language. Even today, the Andhs living in Telangana (across erstwhile Adilabad district) speak Marathi and an Indo-aryan language named after themselves called Andh. It can be surmised that Andhs also has its origins in Telangana. The Andhs are sometimes described as descendants of the Andhra or Satavahana dynasty, although their political status changed over time as central India faced foreign invasions and shifting regional powers. After the decline of the Satavahana dynasty, many became settled agricultural communities and gradually lost any former royal status.

== Etymology ==
The name "Andh" is possibly derived from the Sanskrit term "Andhra," a designation for a tribe historically living in the Andhra region.

== Distribution ==
The Andh people live primarily in the hills of the Adilabad district in Telangana. The Andhs comprise a population of approximately 474,110 according to the 2011 census. The Andh are also distributed in the Parbhani, Nanded, Yavatmal and Akola districts of Maharashtra. According to the Anthropological Survey of India, there are over 74,000 Andhs in Maharashtra. Historically, the Andh were concentrated in central India, including the Marathwada region of Maharashtra and parts of Telangana, reflecting their long-standing presence in the Deccan.

Aundha is located in the Hingoli district of Maharashtra and its Aundha Nagnath Temple is considered one of the eight important Jyotirlingas out of the twelve in India.

== Culture ==
Andh people celebrate Dussehra, Diwali, Sankranti, and Pola (Bull worship), as they are predominantly Hindu and have an agrarian, nature-based social structure. They also follow some ancient traditions, such as the 12 Shivkathi worship, known as Mahadevachi Kathi Puja, which is dedicated to 12 shrines of Shiva. At the end of the 12 days, amhil (jowar millet amhil) is offered to Lord Shiva for prosperity and agricultural wealth.

== Social organization ==
They are further subdivided into the Vertali and the Khaltali. The Vertali consider themselves superior and avoid marrying the Khaltali.

== Language ==
Historically, the Andhs used to speak a Dravidian language, but they have since shifted to the Indo-Aryan Andh language. The Andhs of Maharashtra speak Andh and Marathi. In Andhra Pradesh and Telangana, about 100,000 Andhs speak Telugu.

== Notable people ==
=== Social activist ===
- Sri Sri Sri Sant Paramahamsa Sadhguru Phulaji baba Patnapur, Mungsajee mouli and Kranthi veer Soma Doma Andh

=== Indian Freedom fighters ===
- Shomaji Umare
- Shivajirao Moghe
