= Bagata people =

Indigenous (Scheduled) tribe from India

Bagatha community
Bhaktha, Bugata, Bagatha, Kapu, Rana, Padal
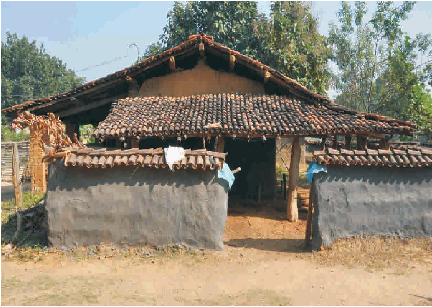
- A traditional house of bagathas

Regions with significant populations
- Andhra Pradesh: 1,33,427
- Odisha: 8,813
- Telangana: 6080 (as per caste census 2024 )

Languages
- Telugu, Desia Odia, Regional languages

Religion
- Hinduism, Christianity, Animism

The Bagathas are one of the tribal groups of India, mainly concentrated in Andhra Pradesh, Odisha, and Telangana. As per the Indian constitution, they are designated as Scheduled Tribe for affirmative action.

== Population distribution ==
The Bagatas are generally scattered in all districts of Odisha, Telangana, and Andhra, but are mainly concentrated in Vishakapatnam, Vizianagaram, East Godavari, Rangareddy district of Andhra Pradesh (including Telangana); Sundargarh, Mayurbhanj, Sambalpur, Baleshwar district of Odisha.

== Overview ==
Bagathas are traditionally a warriors' tribe and claims themselves Kshatriya status. Their alternative names include Bhakta, Bhagata, Bugata, Rana (Bodo rana), and Padal; in Andhra Pradesh, their local name is Kapu. this tribe is one sept of Kapu In Andhra, they use a dialect of the Telugu language, Desia Odia and in Odisha, they left Telugu and speak the regional language like Hindi, Odia, Sadri, Laria, and Kurmali. Bagata people bear biological traits of Proto-Australoid tribes of the south and center India.

=== Social structure ===
The Bagatas of Andhrapradesh retain the original socio-cultural characteristics, whereas the Bagatas of Odisha undergone various socio-cultural purification process and are largely Hinduised. The Bagatas of Odisha are broadly divided into two divisions i.e. Vaishnavites and Saivites according to their beliefs.

The Bagata of Vaishnavas section is divided into totemic clans like Belhar (monkey), Samudia, Bamia, Tiruar (bird), Sarania (flute), Nag, Hatiar (elephant), Chumiar and Kuardar. They use their clan as a surname. However, some authors opined that there was no surname or subgroup system in them but after migration, they adopted those and now almost use surnames like other Hindu societies. Historically, they migrated to the Ranchi region of Chota Nagpur from Andhrapradesh before the 20th century and subsequently migrated to the northern district of Odisha.

In 1976 the Bagata had the highest rate of indebtedness of any of the scheduled tribes of Andhra Pradesh.
