= Manna-Dora language =

Dravidian language of India

Manna-Dora
- Native to: India
- Region: Andhra Pradesh, Tamil Nadu
- Ethnicity: 30,000 (no date)
- Native speakers: 18,000 (2011)
- Language family: Dravidian: Southern; Southern II; Teluguoid; Manna-Dora
- Writing system: Telugu alphabet

Language codes
- ISO 639-3: mju
- Glottolog: mann1245

Manna-Dora is either a nearly extinct Dravidian language closely related to Telugu, or a dialect of Telugu. It is spoken by the eponymous Scheduled Tribe in the state of Andhra Pradesh, India.

== Sources ==
- Zvelebil, Kamil (1990), Dravidian Linguistics: An Introduction, Pondicherry Institute of Linguistics and Culture, ISBN 978-81-8545-201-2
