= Malasar language =

Southern Dravidian language of India

Malasar
- Native to: India
- Native speakers: (7,800 cited 2001 census)
- Language family: Dravidian: Southern; Southern I; Tamil–Kannada; Tamil–Kota; Tamil–Toda; Tamil–Irula; Tamil–Kodava–Urali; Tamil–Malayalam; Tamiloid; Malasa–Eravallan; Malasar
- Early forms: Old Tamil: Middle Tamil

Language codes
- ISO 639-3: ymr
- Glottolog: mala1458

Malasar (Malayar, IPA: [mɐlɐsɐr, mɐlɐjɐr]) is a Southern Dravidian language spoken by a Scheduled tribe of India. It is close to Eravallan.
