= Kuvi language =

Dravidian language spoken in India

Kuvi
- Kuwi, Kuvinga, Kond, Khondi, Jatapu
- କୁଭି, କୁୱି
- Native to: India
- Region: Odisha, Andhra Pradesh
- Ethnicity: 1,627,486 Khonds (2011 census)
- Native speakers: 155,548 (2011 census)
- Language family: Dravidian: South-Central; Konda–Kui; Kui–Kuvi; Kuvi
- Writing system: Odia

Language codes
- ISO 639-3: kxv
- Glottolog: kuvi1243
- ELP: Kuvi

Kuvi (IPA: [kuʋi]) is a South-Central Dravidian language spoken in the Indian state of Odisha. The language is one of two spoken by the Kandhas, with the other being the closely related and more dominant Kui language. According to the 2011 Indian census, there are around 155,000 speakers. The orthography is the Odia script. The grammatical structure of this language is comparable to other similar languages such as Kui which all fall under the classification of a Dravidian language.

== Background information ==
According to a study regarding population structure of tribal populations in central India, information was collected from the Koraput district of Odisha about the Kuvi Kandhas. There were 325,144 people in the district according to the 1971 census. The Kuvi Kandhas are agriculturalists, and their physical appearance is similar to other Kandha groups.

== Phonology ==
Within a study done by A.G. Fitzgerald and F. V. P. Schulze, they spent some time interrogating Kuvi speakers in Araku in Andhra Pradesh. Their information came from a village called Sunkarametta. They also went to Gudari to study the Kuttiya dialect of Kui, and found a Kuvi speaker. It was found that the speakers location influenced their speech. The Kuvi speaker described himself as a Parja Kandha, so some of his dialect is abbreviated by P, while the dialect studied at Araku was indicated by Su. The following vowels and consonants are necessary for the language.

Vowels
	Front		Central		Back	
	short	long	short	long	short	long
High	i	iː			u	uː
Mid	e	eː			o	oː
Low			a	aː		

Consonants
		Labial	Dental	Retroflex	Palatal/ P.alv	Velar	Glottal
Nasal		m	n̪	ɳ		ŋ	
Plosive/ Affricate	voiceless	p	t̪	ʈ	t͡ʃ	k	ʔ
Plosive/ Affricate	voiced	b	d̪	ɖ	d͡ʒ	ɡ	
Fricative			s				h
Approximant		ʋ	l		j		
Rhotic			r	ɽ			

== Grammar ==
All Central Dravidian languages are unified in gender and number distinctions. There is the distinction of masculine vs non-masculine (or feminine and non human) both in singular and plural. There is a simplex negative tense consisting of verb base + negative suffix + personal ending present in all Dravidian languages.

Kuvi	English
va:ha	having come
hi:ha	having given
to:sea	having shown

Kuvi language also contains a past negative tense with the structure- verb base + negative suffix + past suffix + personal ending.

Kuvi	English
hi: -?a-t-e?	I did not give.

=== Past tense ===
Past Tense Examples
English	Kuvi
I was	nānu mazzee
You were	nīnu mazzi
He was	evasi mannesi
She was	ēdi manne
We were	mambu mannomi
You were	meeru manjeri
They were	evari manneri
We are.	Maambu mannomi

=== Present tense ===
Present Tense Examples
English	Kuvi
I am	nānu mai
You are	nīnu manzi
He is	evasi mannesi
We are	mambu mannomi
You are	mimbu manzeri
They are	evari manneri

== See also ==
- Sathupati Prasanna Sree
