= Thakar (tribe) =

Adivasi of Maharashtra

Thaker is an Adivasi tribe of Maharashtra, India. This tribe was originally living in the hilly areas of Maharashtra and is now also found scattered all over the state of Maharashtra, India. (Not to be confused with Thakar)
