= Mate people =

Subtribe of Kuki ethnic group

The Mate people are one of the Kuki tribes of Manipur, India. The Mates – a name, in its literal sense, connotes front beaters and consequently, in the broadest sense as a designation, implies a migratory people – are a little-known tribal community of Manipur, India, whose socio-cultural identity as a distinct tribe was only recently recognised by the Union Government of India and the State Government of Manipur. The Mates achieved recognition as a scheduled tribe in January 2012.

== Religion ==
The Mate people practiced a form of animism until the arrival of Christianity, which they universally adopted.

== Distribution ==
There are 70 Mate Chiefship villages in Manipur: 55 in Chandel district, 13 in Churachandpur district and 2 in Sadar Hills, Senapati district. The most prominent Mate villages are Tengnoupal, Tuibuang and Twisomyang, one of the largest villages in Sadar Hills. The oldest Mate Chiefship village is L. Khaukual situated in the Singngat sub-division of Churachandpur district.
