= Bathudis =

Bathudi
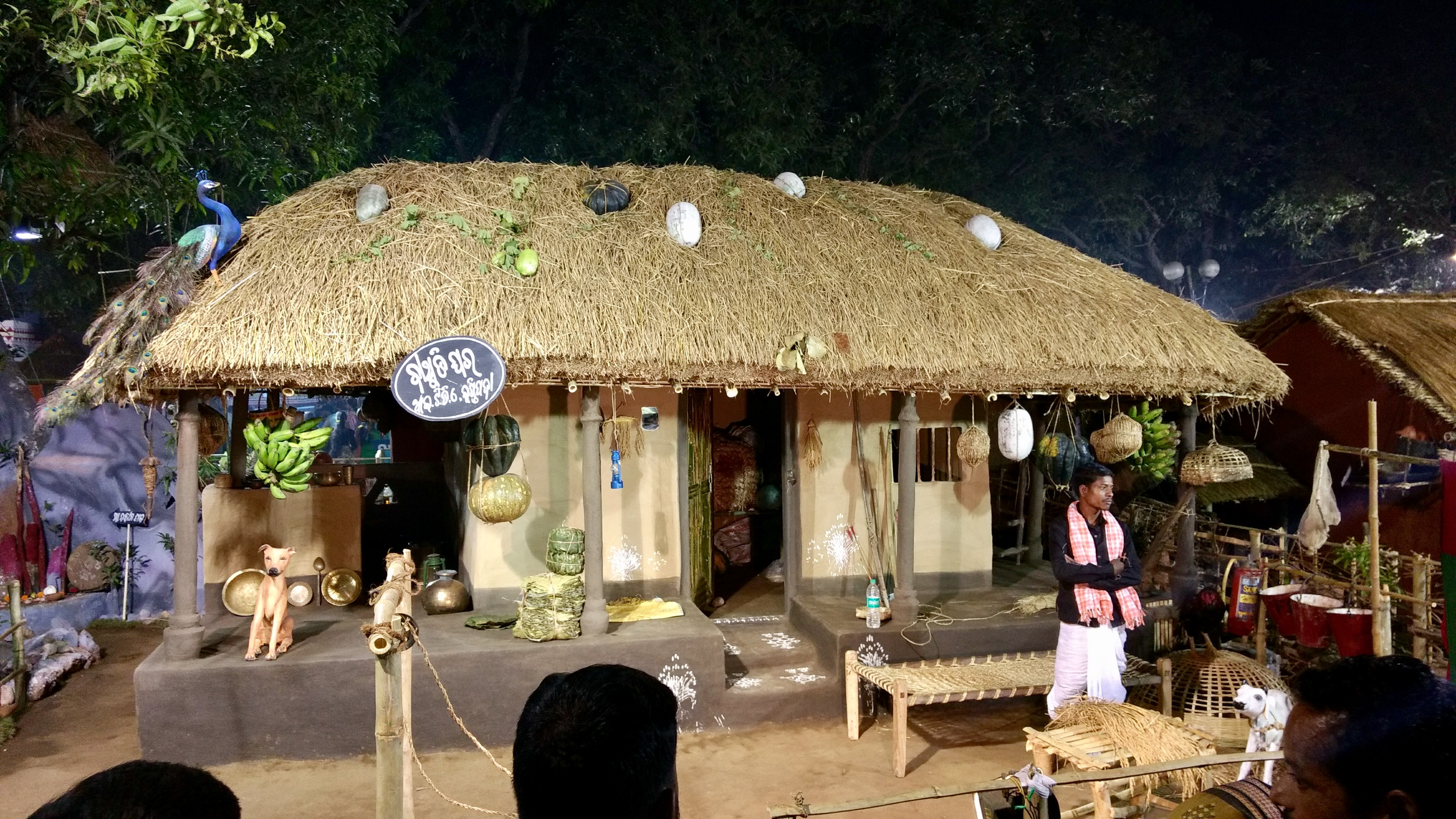
- House of Bathudi tribes at Adivasi Mela, Bhubaneswar

Total population
- 220,859 (2011)

Regions with significant populations
- Odisha: 217,395
- Jharkhand: 3461

Languages
- Odia, Regional languages (Hindi, Bengali, Kurmali, Ho)

Religion
- Hinduism

The Bathudi or Bathuri is a community found mainly in north-western Odisha in India. Some Bathudis, however migrated to neighbouring states of Jharkhand and West Bengal. The 2011 census showed their population to be around 220,859. They are classified as a Scheduled Tribe by the Indian government.

== History ==
The Bathudis' origin is uncertain. However they could be traced back the Panchpaidh (Panchpir) plateau of Mayurbhanj District and Simlipal forest range. They migrated to neighbouring areas over time.

== Culture ==
The Bathudis believe that they are originated from arms of Brahma. A section of Bathudi society have embraced Hinduism and worship Hindu gods and goddesses. While they observe some of the Hindu festivals and rituals, they have kept their animist beliefs.

They are an endogamous society with separate exogamous sections. Each exogamous section is called a khilli. More than 50 such sections have been recorded. Marriage within the same khilli is proscribed. Cousin marriage both from the paternal or maternal side is also taboo. Sororate marriage is practised but not strictly sanctioned by the society. Wedding ceremony takes place either in the house of the groom or the bride. Similar to a Hindu wedding, a Brahmin priest usually officiates in the ceremony. Marriage by service and the system of Gharjuain is prevalent among them.

Karna Guru is an important figure in a Bathudi society. A Karna guru is a Baishnab Guru who initiates them with specific chants both before the start of important events such as education and weddings.

Birth pollution is practised for nine days. But the mother is not allowed to enter the kitchen and touch the cooking pots for twenty one days. Naming ceremony of the child can happen on the ninth day or on twenty-first-day. The mother is prohibited from eating fish, sweets and ripe jackfruit for about two years after birth of child. She is, however, allowed to eat meat and leafy vegetables.

Tradition of both burial and cremation are practised.

Most of the Bathudis speak a dialect of Odia; a few have taken to Ho language as their mother tongue. Bathudis of Jharkhand speak a dialect of Hindi and use Devnagari script. Some of them also speak Bengali and Kudmali.

There houses are mainly made of mud walls and thatched roofs. Frequently decoration of multi-coloured floral designs are found on their walls. Typical household holds goods like stringed Charpoys; aluminium, bell metal and earthen utensils; bow and arrow, fishing tools, mats, etc. Male attire include cotton dhoti and the women wear sari. Women and girls use coloured ribbons, fresh flowers, paper/plastic flowers to style their hair. For ornaments they prefer silver to gold. Tattooing known as Khada among them, is popular with the women. Bathudi girls tattoo one or two floral designs on their forehead or arm before marriage.

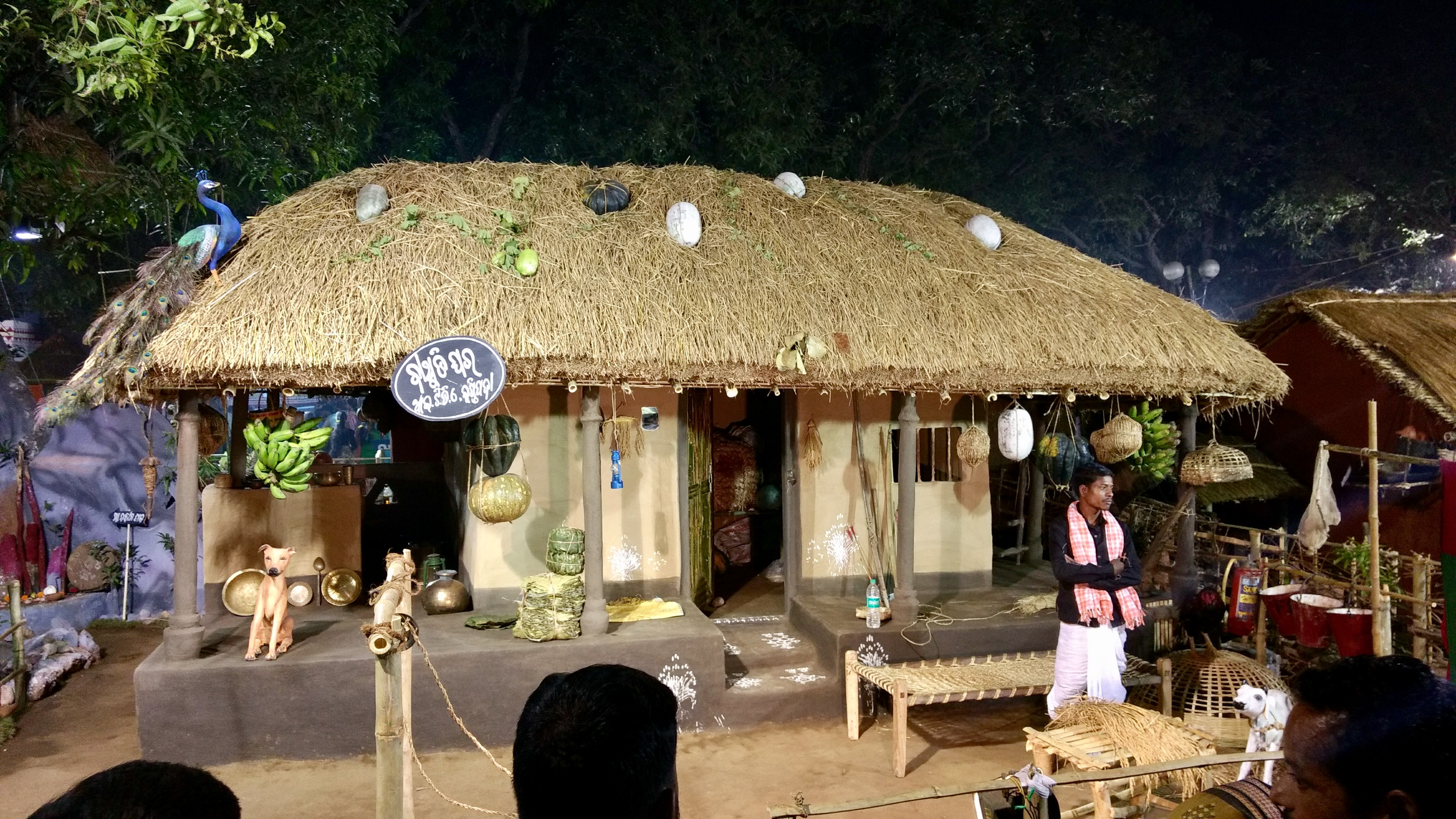
A model of a Bathudi house

The main source of income in the society is farming or related work. They mostly work as farm labourers. Women weave mats out of date palm leaves and prepare leaf cups and plates both for domestic use and sale. Making and selling rice products such as Chuda and Mudi is also another occupation for lean months.
