= Dhodia people =

Tribe in India

Dhodia
- Location: Vapi To Tapi in Gujarat India
- Population: 5,36,000 (2012)

Dhodia are an Adivasi people who have been placed in the Indian communities recognition, under Schedule Tribes. The majority of the Dhodia tribes are located in the southern part of Gujarat (Navsari, Surat and Valsad districts), Dadra and Nagar Haveli and Daman and Diu, Madhya Pradesh, Maharashtra, Karnataka and Rajasthan. In Maharashtra, they are found mainly in the district of Thane. They speak Dhodia language, which has some unique words, as well as some words influenced by Gujarati and Marathi.

== Religion and customs ==
Most of the Dhodia believe in traditional religious practices . The majority of Dhodia people worship Khatra and Nature, while some follow Hinduism. The Dhodia community also has several subcastes or 'Kul' within it.

Dhodia clan have a clan deity Bhavani Mata and kul dev Bharam Dev. They have yearly worship at the clan temple. The Dhodia also worship Chosath Jogini and Bagla Brahmchari. Baliya dev.. They have a death ritual called Parjan every two years, in which everyone gathers for ancestors rituals. Dhodia Females traditionally wear 'Kachhedo' or 'Dhadku', a type of saree which closely resembles the Marathi saree.

== Festivals ==
They celebrate festivals that other Hindus do. Diwali, Holi are some examples. The majority of Dhodia believe in and are devoted to "Kanasari" or "Kanseri" (Goddess of food). They celebrate the "Kanseri" festival annually at harvest. The "Kanseri" Goddess is otherwise known as Goddess "Annapurna" by many Hindus.

The Dhodia also celebrate "Divaso".

Vagh baras is also celebrated in a unique fashion in some Dhodia villages where men colour themselves in stripes representing the Vagh(tiger) and others as plain white or other colours denoting cattle. The tiger chases the cattle. Finally at the end of the sport the village inhabitants eat together and celebrate. During five days of Diwali they celebrate their folk dance called Gheria. Also they make Bhakhras for pooja rituals to their Kuldev on this day.

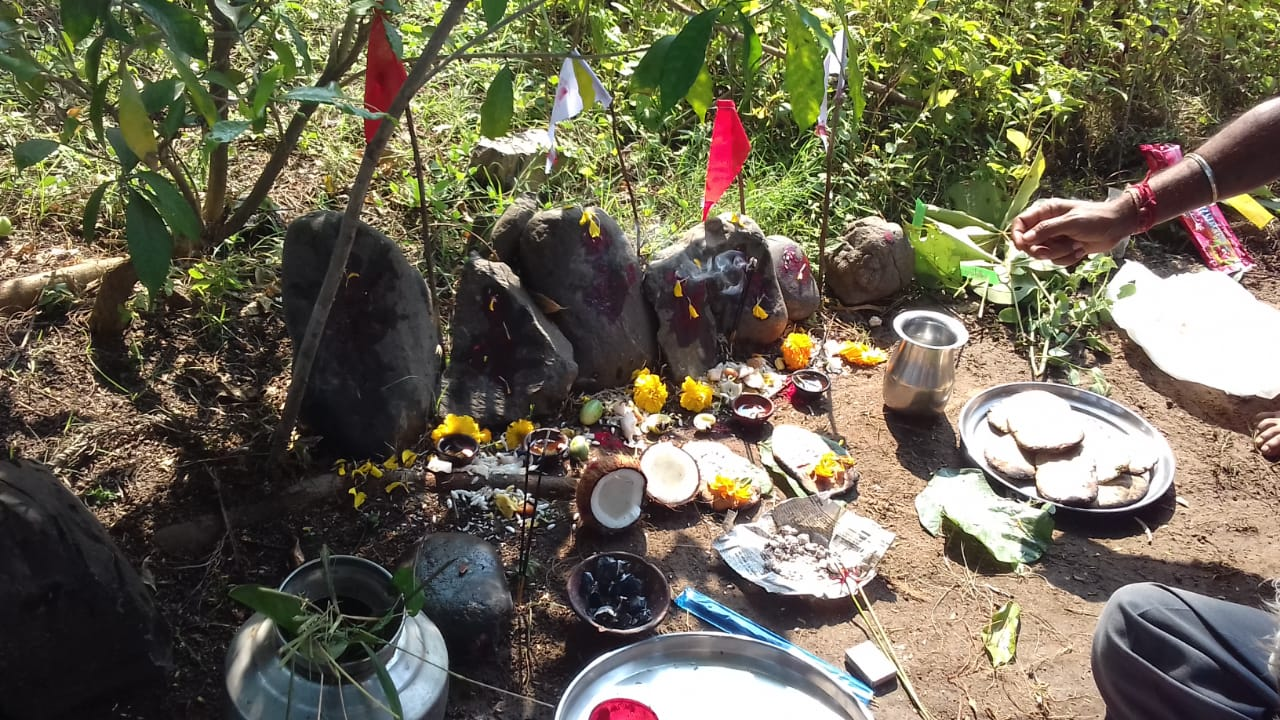
Vaghbaras

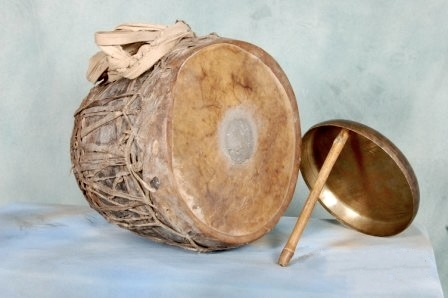
Dhodia Tur ane Thail

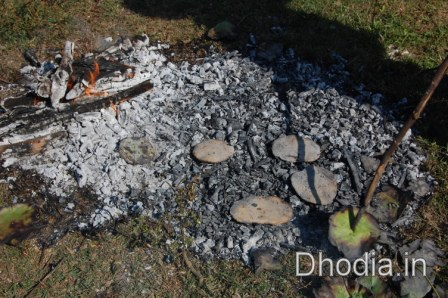
Vagh Baras Na Bhakhara

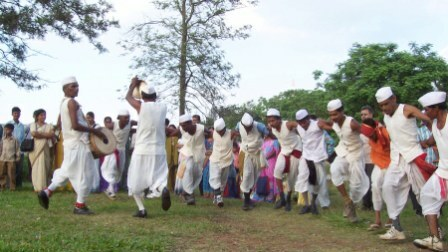
Dhodia Dance Turiya

== See also ==
- Naikda
