= Street law (disambiguation) =

Street law may refer to:

- Street law, a globally-syndicated program of legal education geared at primary school students
- Street Law (1974 film), an Italian movie starring Franco Nero
- Street Law (1995 film), an American action film
- Street Law (TV series), a Sky One reality television programme
- New Street Law, a BBC One television series
