= Centre for Clinical Legal Education (Palacký University, Faculty of Law) =

Centre for Clinical Legal Education of Palacký University Faculty of Law
- Centrum pro klinické právní vzdělávání Právnické fakulty Univerzity Palackého
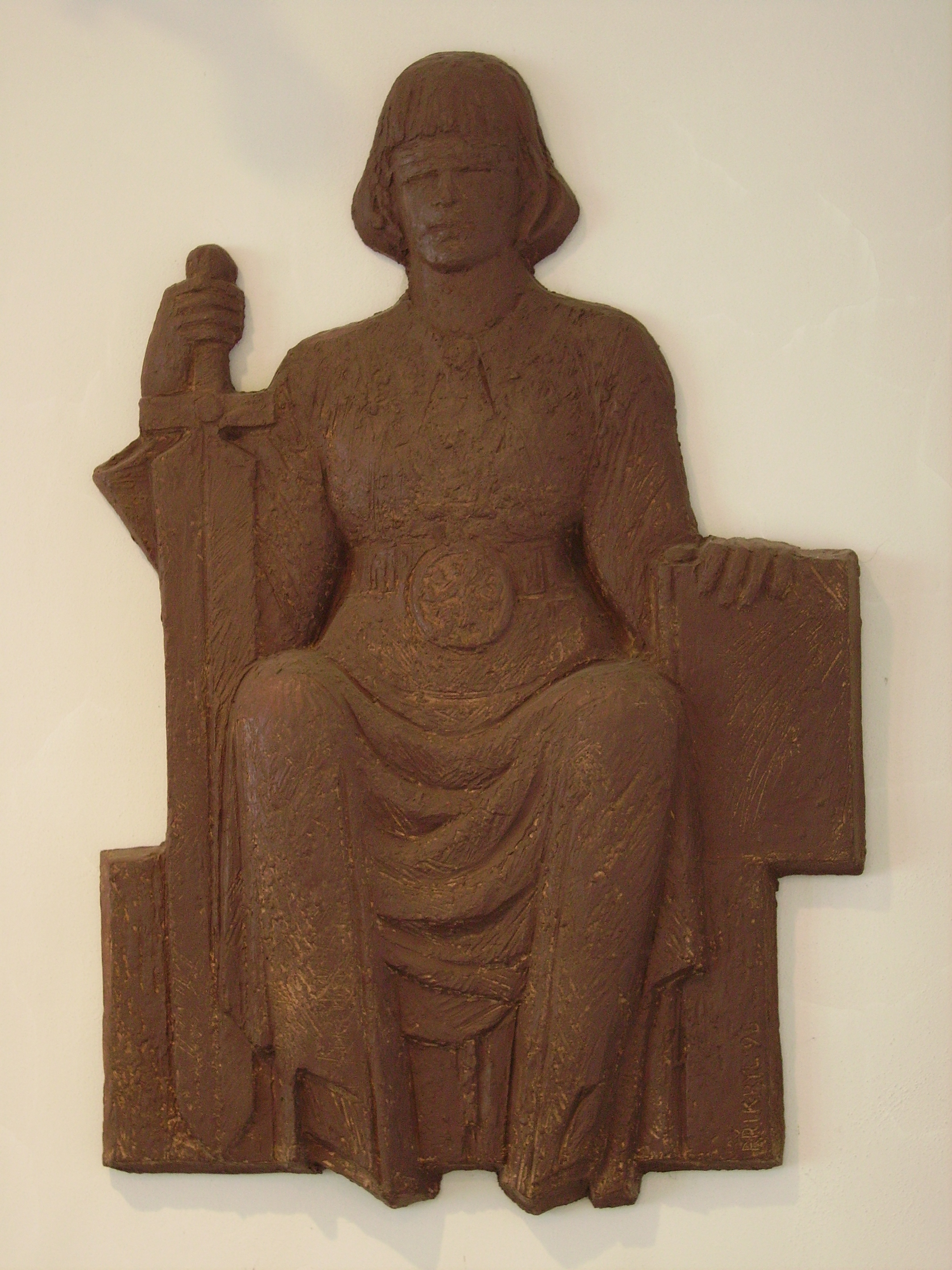
- Established: 1996
- Administrative staff: Maxim Tomoszek (Director)
- Students: ~ 150 (in 2008/2009) (without Juristic Skills Workshop)
- Location: Olomouc, Czech Republic; 49.58999°N 17.26190°E
- Website: pf.upol.cz (in Czech)

The Centre for Clinical Legal Education (Czech: Centrum pro klinické právní vzdělávání) is an institute of Palacký University Faculty of Law, which focuses on practical ways of teaching prospective lawyers. While most of the syllabus in the Faculty's five-year Master program of Law and Jurisprudence comprises the Law in Books (taught at the university since 1679), the Centre focuses on Law in Action.

In 1996 Palacký University Faculty of Law was the first law school in Central Europe to introduce legal clinics and today it is still the only law faculty in the Czech Republic that provides its students with a wide-ranging clinic-based education. The clinics were swiftly expanded and improved, especially after 2006, thanks to a project for the advancement of practical education, which received financial support from both the Czech national budget and the European Social Fund. At the same time the newly established Centre for Clinical Legal Education took responsibility for running clinics.

Today the Centre provides methodical aids for innovation in current school subjects as well as for the implementation of new school subjects in the taught Master's degree in Law, while it also runs the clinics.

== Clinics ==
As of 2011 there are over 15 clinical subjects at Olomouc Faculty of Law. The Student Legal Aid Office is a live-client clinic, and the other clinics are hybrid clinics combining both theoretical lectures and practical legal experience. Participation in the two semesters long Juristic Skills Workshop is compulsory for 2nd year students of the 5-year-long Law degree; the other clinics are optional.

In addition to the clinics listed below, Law Faculty students may also undertake a one-month internship at one of the Czech courts. A participating student is awarded 3 ECTS-credits, subject to confirmation by a presiding judge.

=== Student Legal Aid Office ===
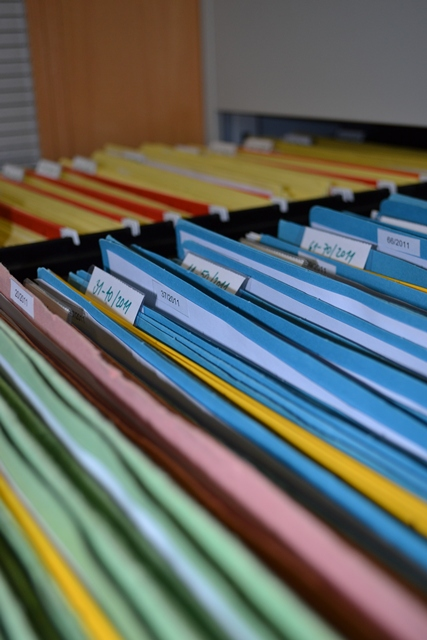
Case files at the Student Legal Aid Office

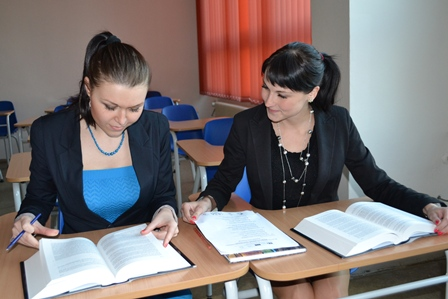
Students conducting research on a clinical case

The Student Legal Aid Office provides pro bono legal support and advice to socially, economically or otherwise disadvantaged individuals. The clinic is divided into sections (Civil Law, Family Law, Labour Law, etc.) with no more than ten students in each. Each section has a guarantor, who is the Faculty's lecturer specializing in the appropriate field. During office hours the students interview new clients seeking legal help from the Clinic in greater detail and, on the basis of the interview, prepare a document file. The document file is then given to the section's guarantor: the guarantor assigns it to particular students of his section (usually not the same ones who first interviewed the client) to solve the legal issues and propose further steps (e.g. legal remedies, drafting of a contract, and so on). If the need arises, the assigned students may contact the client for further information or documents. Subject to guarantor's authorization of the legal advice, the client is invited for another meeting, in which the assigned students hand him over the legal advice in writing and orally explain its content.

Students must learn how to manage the paperwork concerning the clients and cases. Prior to starting at the Aid Office, the students undergo two one-day workshops, the first aimed at work organisation and the second aimed at practical legal skills. Successful participation in the Student Legal Aid Office is rewarded by 6 ECTS-credits (in one semester).

The clinic takes one semester and is run every semester, but students can participate only once (because there are too many students chasing too few cases).

Clients are obliged to consent that the university takes no liability; students are forbidden to give legal advice at the first meeting, and a guarantor's authorization is obligatory before giving any advice (which usually takes a couple of weeks, except in urgent cases).

Matters concerning criminal law are excluded from the legal aid office.

The laws of the Czech Republic don't allow the law students to represent the clients in front of the courts.

Address of the office: Právnická fakulta Univerzity Palackého v Olomouci, Třída 17. listopadu 8, Olomouc, building A

=== Hybrid clinics ===
Thy hybrid clinics combine theoretical lectures (especially in areas which are not taught with sufficient detail in the theoretical subjects), followed by simulations in order to strengthen the knowledge and are crowned by providing legal aid to real clients.

Of particular importance to running hybrid clinics is the cooperation with NGOs, since the Faculty's legal aid office would not be able to supply sufficient variety of cases in the specific legal areas. Also the Faculty's professors may lack the necessary practical experience in the areas. Last but not least in the case of Refugee Law Clinic the students provide legal aid as aids of NGO's lawyers within refugee camps, which would be otherwise inaccessible to them.

==== Human Rights Clinic ====
The Human Rights Clinic focuses on up-to-date issues of Human Rights Protection in the Czech Republic. Depending on students' interests the clinic deals with issues of freedom of assembly, freedom of speech, domestic violence and so on. The Clinic takes one semester and has capacity for ten students; the clinic is awarded by 6 ECTS-credits.

The clinic is organized into an interactive theoretical part, in which the students learn necessary information, and a practical part, in which the students solve real issues, interact with a client and learn juristic skills.

The Liga lidských práv (Human Rights League) NGO and the Ombudsman's office co-author the clinic.

==== Antidiscrimination Law Clinic ====
The antidiscrimination laws lap over a number of legal areas. The clinic aims at providing complex familiarization of students with issues connected to the field. The students initially strengthen their theoretical knowledge, while later they work with concrete cases of discriminatory actions. The clinic is co-authored by the Liga lidských práv (Human Rights League) NGO.

==== Patient's Rights Legal Clinic ====
The Patient's Rights Legal Clinic aims at the medical laws (and connected legal areas, such as damages) of the Czech Republic from the point of view of the patients. The clinic is co-authored by lecturers of the Medical Faculty and by the lawyers of the Liga lidských práv (Human Rights League) NGO. The theoretical part consists of six four-hours intensive seminars, which include solving case studies, guided discussions with experts and independent student work in order to prepare them for the practical part of giving legal advice.

==== Social Security Law Clinic ====
The Social security Law Clinic aims at providing help to the clients of the Student Legal Aid Office. There was formerly social security branch of the Student Legal Aid Office, however the versatility and especially frequent updating of the social security laws required thorough theoretical update of students' knowledge. So despite the fact that the area is more or less fully covered in the Faculty's theoretical subjects, the Social Security branch of the Legal Aid office is now run as a hybrid clinic. Cooperation with regional administrative court is also part of the clinic: students have full access to case files on judicial review of acts of administration in the field of social security; the students write opinions regarding the adjudicated cases.

==== Consumers' Rights Clinic ====
The theoretical part of the Consumers' Rights Clinic thoroughly tutors contemporary issues of consumer protection in the Czech Republic. This is followed by simulations of consumer contracts disputes. In the end the students provide help to the clients of the Student Legal Aid Office and to clients of the Sdružení obrany spotřebitelů ČR (Consumers' defence association) NGO, which also co-authors the clinic.

==== Refugee Law Clinic ====
The Refugee Law Clinic takes two semesters (with 5 ECTS-credits for each) and has capacity for ten students. The clinic has two parts. The theoretical part is given by expert lecturers from the UNHCR, the Ombudsman's office, the Czech Government Office, and other organisations. The students learn law concerning areas of foreigners' residency in the Czech Republic, asylum law, the procedure of awarding international protection, psychological aspects of the procedure, laws concerning European protection of refugees, integration of foreigners and refugees, as well as expulsion of foreigners and other related areas.

The practical part is conducted in coordination with Sdružení občanů zabývajích se emigranty (Association of citizens concerned with emigrants) NGO. Students undergo excursions and work experience in Czech refugee camps (for example in Vyšní Lhoty), take part in the process of giving legal advice, counsel clients and solve real cases. As well as searching for information concerning a country of origin, they prepare the forms for refugee protection and legal remedies for unfavourable decisions. The students also have the chance to represent the faculty at Moot courts related to the field.

==== Legal Clinic: Electronic Communications Law ====
The aim of the Electronic Communications Legal Clinic is to follow up a theoretical subject The Law and Information Technology by working with literature, cases from abroad, etc. The clinic focuses on topics like E-business, domain names and e-government. Education is both theoretical and practical, conducted by faculty lecturers and outside experts. The clinic has capacity of 10 students, is awarded by 4 ECTS-credits and runs only in summer semester.

==== Small Business and NGO Legal Clinic ====
The Small Business and NGO Legal Clinic focuses on issues connected to the two fields. The students learn to differentiate between varieties of corporate entities and also which form may be suitable for a specific purpose. They learn how to write the basic documents of a corporate entity that are necessary to establish and run it. The clinic also focuses on issues of taxation and finance. Debates with representatives of different corporate entities are also part of the course. The clinic has capacity of 10 students, is awarded by 4 ECTS-credits and runs only in summer semester.

==== Administrative Law Clinic ====
The Administrative Law Clinic familiarizes students with the practical operation of public services. Lectures make up a comprehensive mix of theoretical and practical education. Students solve real cases, interact with clients, learn juristic skills, take part in excursions, and debate about current problems in public services. The students take part in administrative moot courts as well as work on real cases and learn from inside how non-governmental organizations work.

One part of the clinic consists of work on different projects, which the students agree upon at the beginning of the semester. The practical part is conducted in cooperation with Hnutí DUHA Olomouc (Olomouc Rainbow Movement) NGO. The clinic has capacity of 12 students and is awarded by 5 ECTS-credits per semester, while it runs two semesters.

==== Environmental Law Clinic ====
The Faculty's students who want to specialize in the field of environmental protection deepen their theoretical knowledge by application of the legal acts on concrete cases and case studies. The practical part is conducted in cooperation with Hnutí DUHA Olomouc (Olomouc Rainbow Movement) NGO.

==== International Arbitration Clinic ====
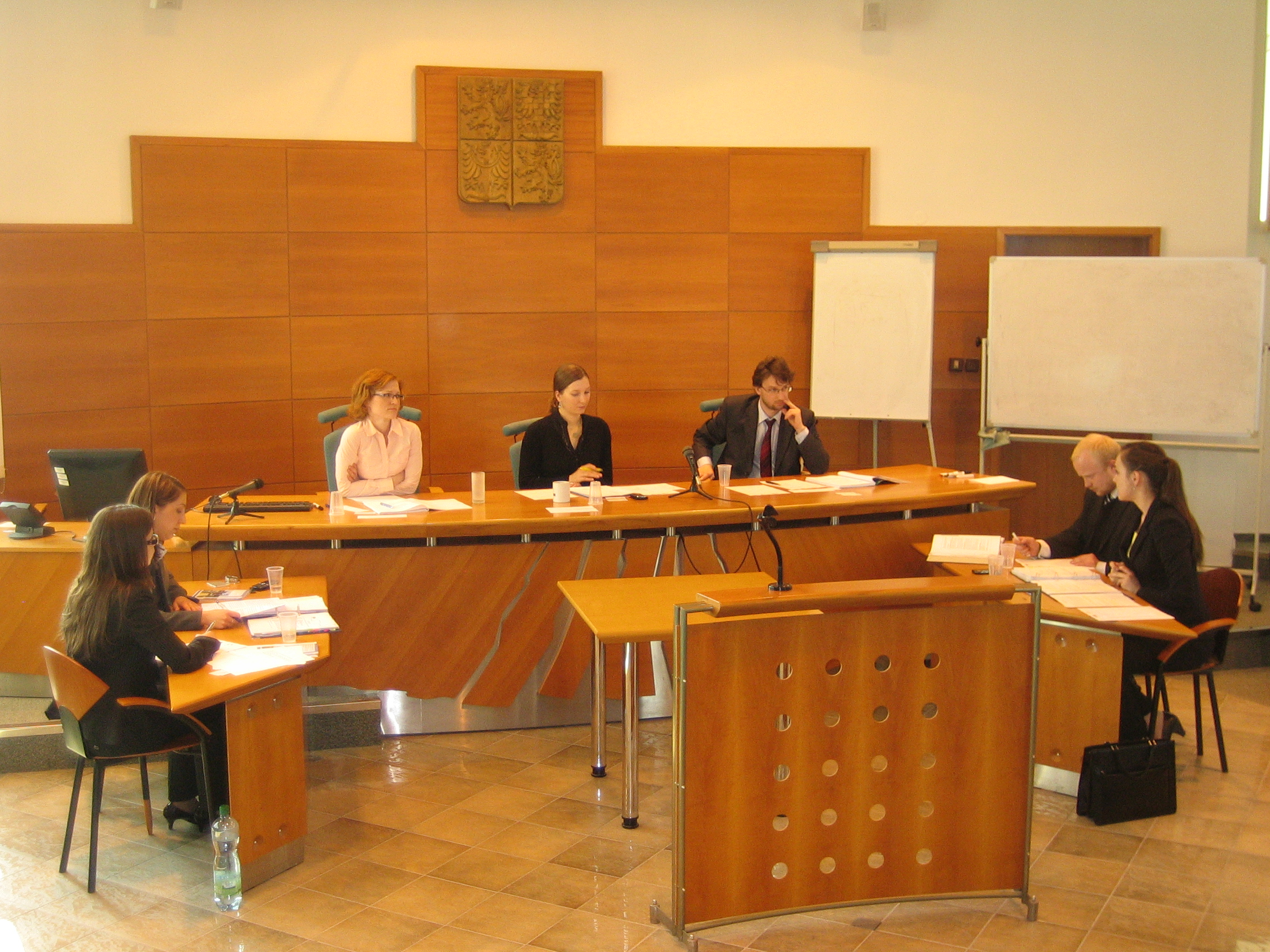
Willem C. Vis pre-moot at the Palacký law school's courtroom

The International Arbitration Clinic is a special clinic run by the centre, which prepares the Olomouc Vis Moot Team for the Willem C. Vis International Commercial Arbitration Moot. The team also takes part in number of pre-moots, and each year since 2008 the Faculty has made its own pre-moot in Olomouc, using its own courtroom. Students who take part in the Moot Court gain 4 ECTS-credits per semester.

=== Street law ===
Street law clinic Law for Every Day aims at dissemination of legal knowledge to the non-specialist population. The theoretical part is divided into the knowledge segment and skills segment. The knowledge segment aims at fostering knowledge obtained at Faculty's theoretical lectures in order to comprehend mutual coherency of areas of law taught separately. The skills segment aims at improvement of presentation and communication skills. The law students learn how to translate complicated legal issues so that a non-specialist would clearly understand it. The practical part is conducted as teaching packet at selected high schools. There the law students teach the high school students how to effectively deal with everyday issues of legal nature. Apart from social dimension the main target is to teach the law students the basics of presentation and argumentation in order to effectively communicate expert knowledge.

=== Juristic Skills Workshop ===
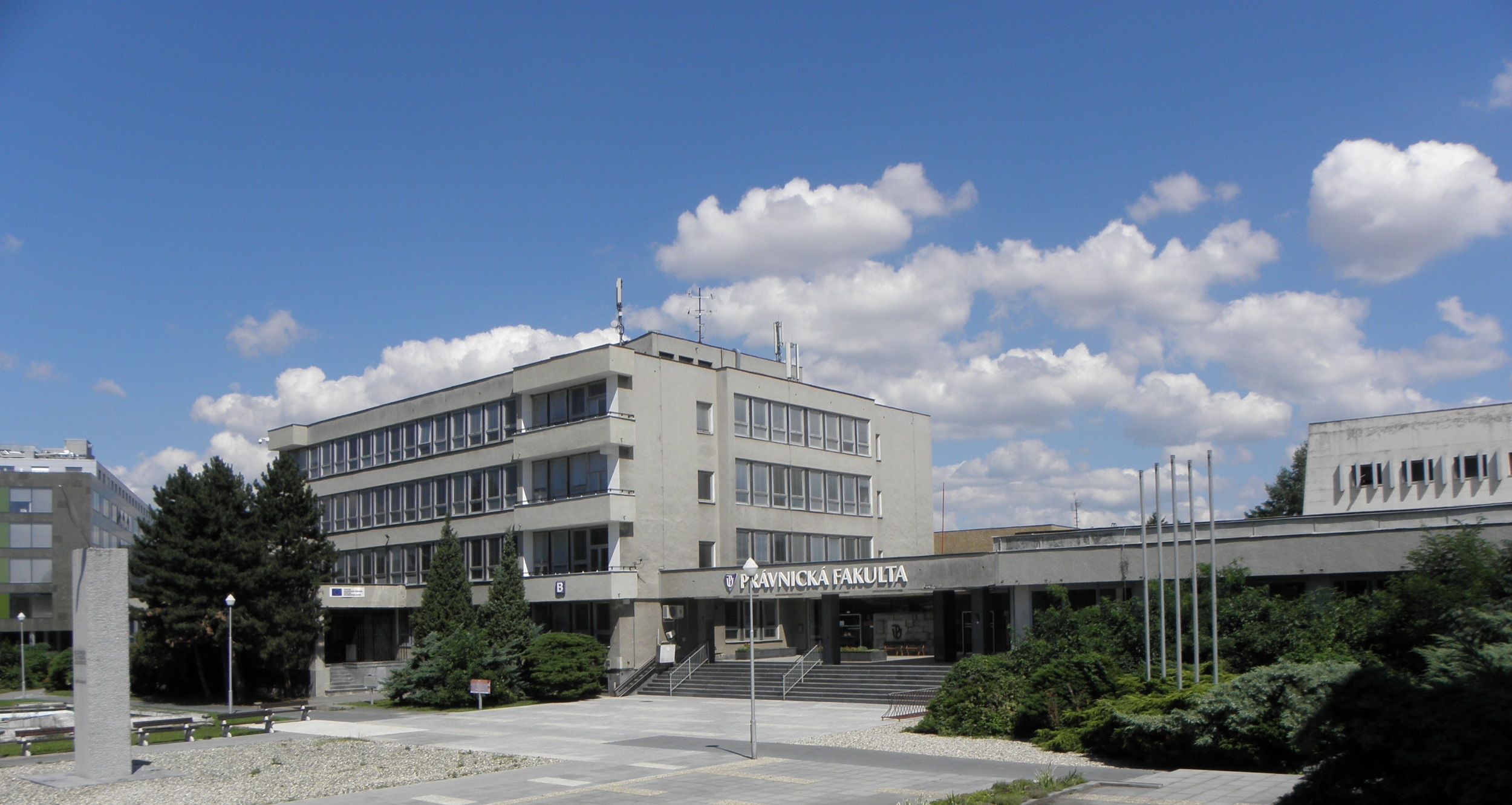
Palacký University Faculty of Law

The Juristic Skills Workshop is not a clinic within narrow meaning of the term, however since it aims at practical skills, it is included as a program of the centre and not as one of the theoretical legal subjects.

The Juristic Skills Workshop was introduced in the academic year 2007/08. It is compulsory for 2nd year students of the 5-year-long Law degree. The workshop takes two semesters. Its aim is to boost students' practical skills and so to prepare students to apply the law. It is therefore complementary to the other subjects of procedural law and substantive law. Subject to successfully passing the Workshop, students gain 3 ECTS-credits per each semester.

The course aims foremost in the fields of:

- professional ethics and liability
- legal information
- general presentation skills
- writing legal texts
- case analysis
- general communication skills
  - legal advice
  - negotiation
  - client interviews
- Moot court

=== Other clinical programs ===
There are other clinical programs, such as the Professional Ethics (which deals with ethics of lawyers, judges, public prosecutors, and so on), Human Rights Laboratory (aiming at International human rights protection), or Civil Law Moot Court. These remain mostly theoretical with practical part focusing on simulations.

== See also ==
- Legal clinic
- Street law
