= Stanford Law School Three Strikes Project =

American legal representation clinic

The Stanford Law School Three Strikes Project is one of the eleven Mills Legal Clinics at Stanford Law School. Founded in 2006, it provides legal representation to convicts serving life sentences under California's three strikes law for committing minor, non-violent felonies. Under the supervision of clinic instructors, students represent clients in both federal and state court. The Project is directed by attorney and lecturer Michael Romano.

In order to secure the release of its clients, the Project pursues resentencing hearings or constitutional challenges to the sentences imposed, either by direct appeal or post-conviction habeas petitions. Typical claims include ineffective assistance of counsel under the Sixth Amendment, cruel and unusual punishment prohibited by the Eighth Amendment, and habeas petitions with newly discovered evidence under People v. Superior Court (Romero), 13 Cal.4th 497 (1996), and People v. Williams, 17 Cal.4th 148 (1998). Clinic students work in two-person teams representing a single client, visiting the client in prison, conducting factual investigations throughout California, and drafting court pleadings and briefs.

Despite facing difficult legal terrain under Ewing v. California, 538 U.S. 11 (2003), and Lockyer v. Andrade, 538 U.S. 63 (2003), in which the United States Supreme Court effectively foreclosed relief for the disproportionality of third-strike sentences under the federal Cruel and Unusual Punishment Clause, the Project has been largely successful. To date, it has won the reversal or resentencing of over 150 people. Previous clients had been sentenced to life in prison for minor crimes such as possession of less than a gram of narcotics, stealing a dollar's worth of change from a car, shoplifting three disposable cameras, writing bad checks, and stealing tools from a tow truck.

The Project has been featured in stories by the New York Times Magazine, the Los Angeles Times, The Economist, and the BBC.

== See also ==
- Stanford Law School
- Legal clinic
- Defense (legal)
- Three strikes law
- Recidivism
- Habitual Offender Laws
