= Meena =

Ethnic group in western India

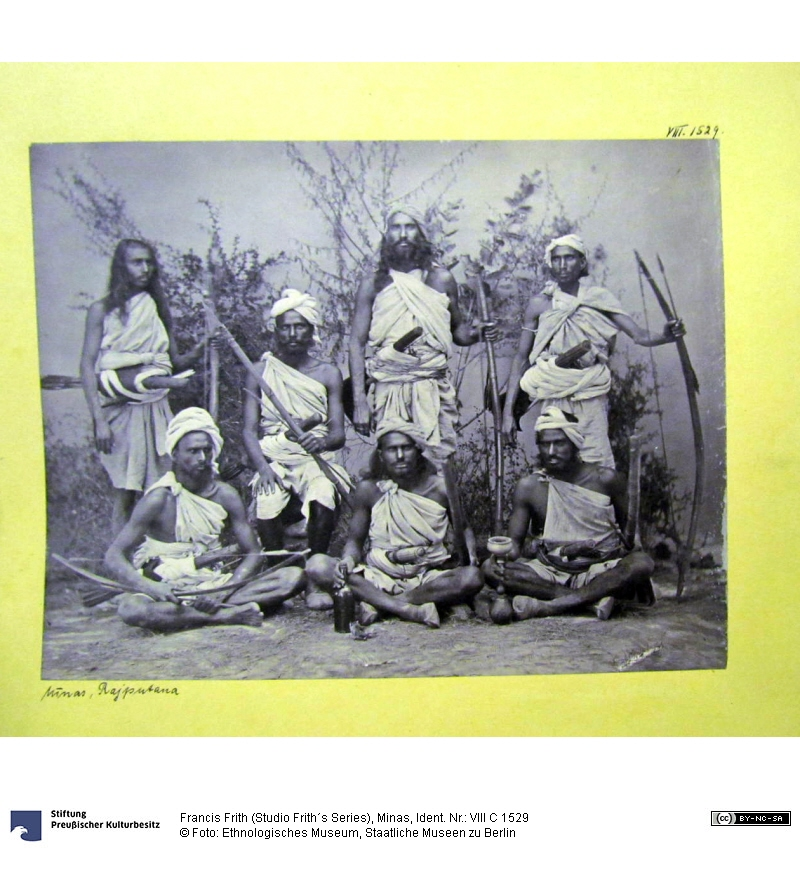
- 1888 picture of Meenas

Total population
- 5 million (2011 Census)

Regions with significant populations
- India

Languages
- Hindi, Mewari, Marwari, Dhundari, Harauti, Mewati, Wagdi, Malvi, Bhili etc.

Religion
- Hinduism Islam and Others

Related ethnic groups
- • Bhil • Parihar • Meo

Meena (pronounced [miːɳa]) is a tribe from northern and western India which is sometimes considered a sub-group of the Bhil community. They received the status of Scheduled Tribe by the Government of India in 1954.

== Ethnography ==
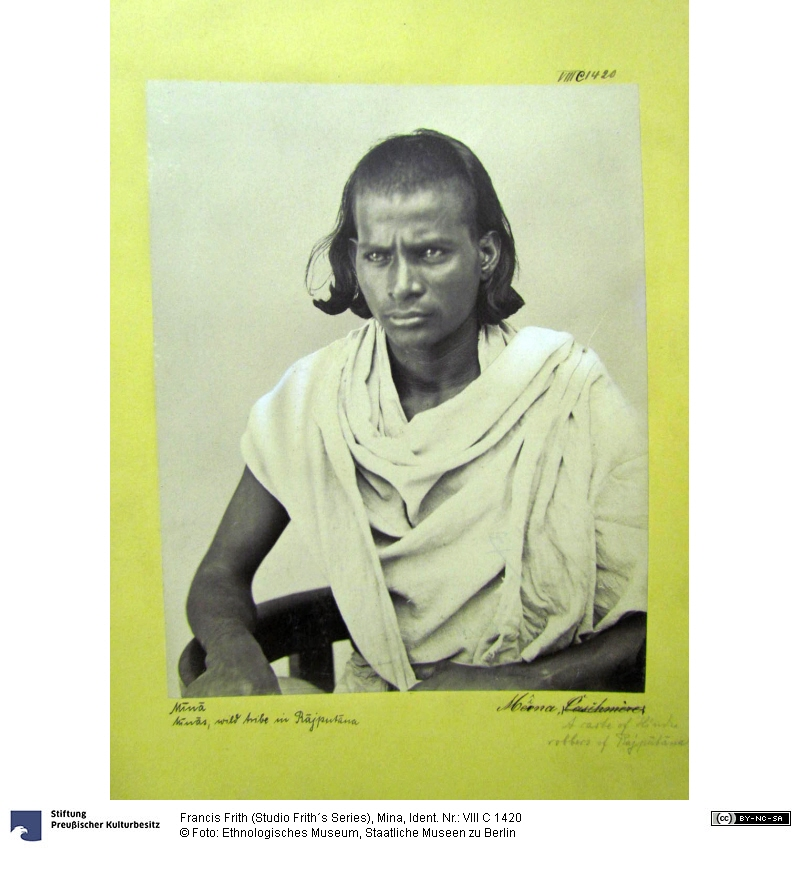
Mina caste man in 1898

The Meenas were originally a nomadic tribe. They were described as a semi-wild and hill tribe similar to the Bhils. During the British Raj in India, the British Government classified them as a "criminal tribe" under the Criminal Tribes Act. Presently they are described as a Scheduled Tribe by the Indian Government.

== Geography ==
Currently, they are present in the states of Rajasthan, Madhya Pradesh, Maharashtra, Uttar Pradesh, Punjab and Haryana and the Union Territory of Delhi in India.

== History ==
=== Origin ===
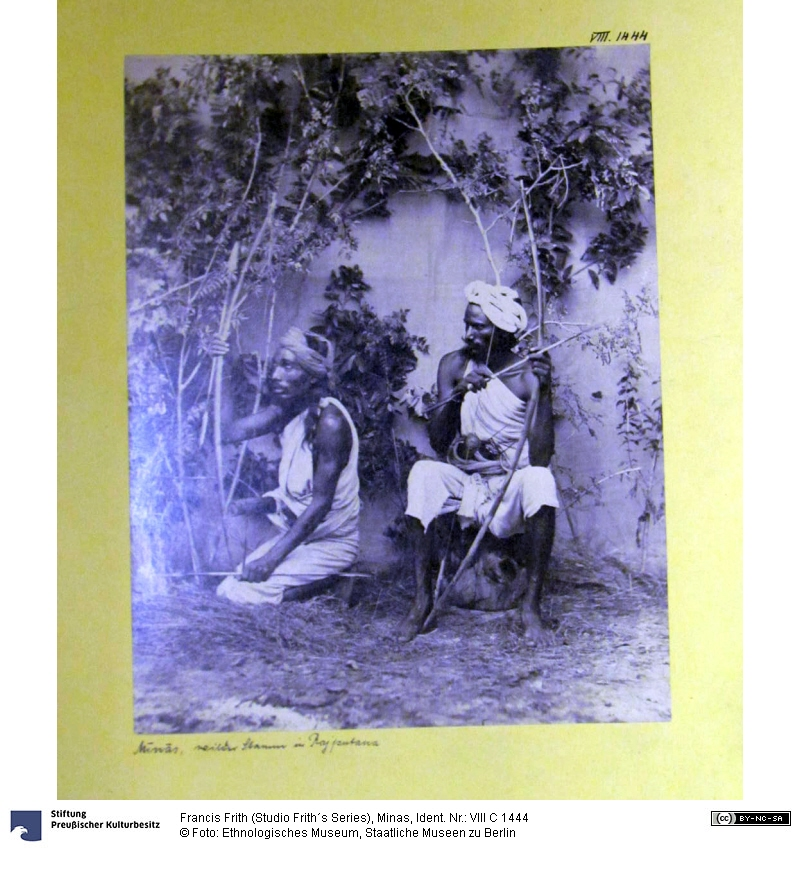
Minas

The Meenas claim a mythological descent from the Matsya avatar, or fish incarnation, of Vishnu. They also claim to be descendants of the people of the Matsya Kingdom, which flourished in the 6th century B.C. The historian Pramod Kumar notes that it is likely that the tribes living in the ancient Matsya kingdom were called Meena but it cannot be said with certainty that there is anything common between them and the modern Meenas. They are considered to be adivasi (aboriginal people).

Nandini Sinha Kapur, a historian who has studied early India, notes that the oral traditions of the Meenas were developed from the early 19th century AD in an attempt to reconstruct their identity. She says of this process, which continued throughout the 20th century, that "The Minas try to furnish themselves a respectable present by giving themselves a glorious past". In common with the people of countries such as Finland and Scotland, the Meenas found it necessary to invent tradition through oral accounts, one of the primary uses of which is recognised by both historians and sociologists as being "social protest against injustices, exploitation and oppression, a raison d'être that helps to retrieve the image of a community." Kapur notes that the Meenas not merely lack a recorded history of their own but also have been depicted in a negative manner both by medieval Persian accounts and records of the colonial period. From medieval times through to the British Raj, references to the Meenas describe them as violent, plundering criminals and an anti-social ethnic tribal group.

According to Kapur, the Meenas also attempt Rajputization of themselves.

=== Rajput period ===
The Meenas ruled at certain places in Rajasthan until they were overpowered by the invading Rajputs. After the end of their rule, the Meenas made forests and hills their sanctuary and started fighting to reclaim their kingdom. One such example was the Kingdom of Amber, Who had to face many wars to stop their struggle and later established peace by making treaty with conditionals. From Meenas the Bundi was captured by Rao Dewa (A.D. 1342), Dhundhar by Kachhwaha Rajputs and Chopoli by the Muslim rulers. Kota, Jhalawar, Karauli and Jalore were the other areas of earlier Meena influence where they were forced to surrender ultimately.

=== British colonial period ===
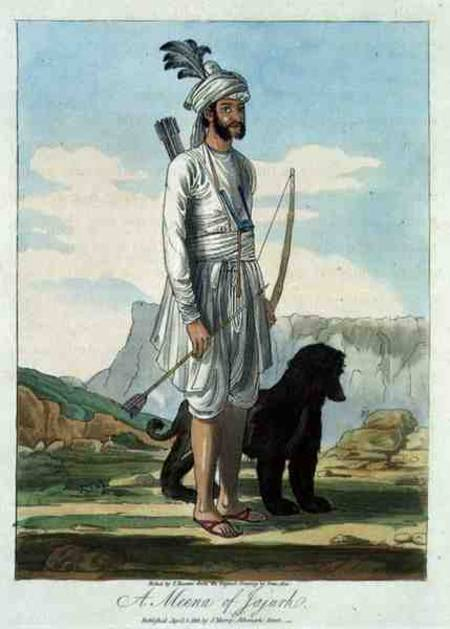
A Meena of Jajurh

The Raj colonial administration came into existence in 1858, following the Indian Rebellion of 1857 which caused the government of Britain to decide that leaving colonial administration in the hands of the East India Company was a recipe for further discontent. In an attempt to create an orderly administration through a better understanding of the populace, the Raj authorities instituted various measures of classifying the people of India. One such measure was the Criminal Tribes Act of 1871, under the provisions of which Meenas were placed in the first list of the Act in 1872 in Patiala and East Punjab States Union, Rajasthan and Punjab. Another such measure was the Habitual Criminals Act of 1930, under whose provisions the Meenas were placed. The community remained stigmatised for many years, notably by influential officials of the Raj such as Herbert Hope Risley and Denzil Ibbetson, and were sometimes categorised as animists and as a hill tribe similar to the Bhils. The Meenas remained an officially designated criminal tribe until 1952, three years after the Act had been repealed. Mark Brown has examined the impact and issues of the Meena community during British rule and the change in their status from being a higher social group to a criminal tribe.

=== Rebellion ===
In the 1840s, Meenas organized a huge movement in Jaipur under the leadership of Lakshminarayan Jharwal against the British rule, which was a Meena rebellion against the British government.

=== Recent history ===
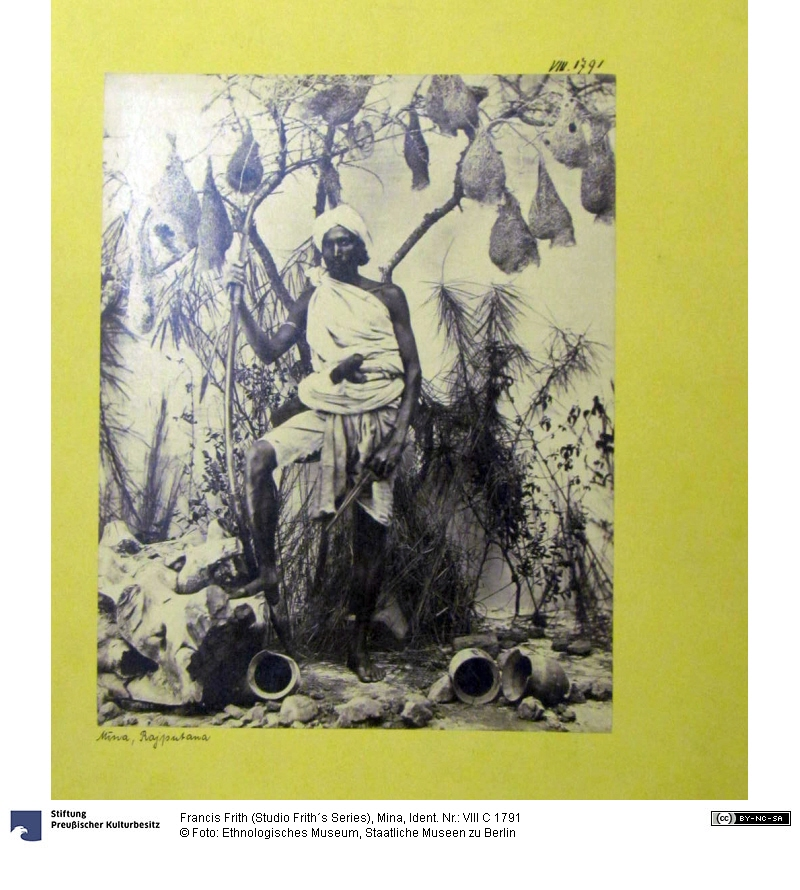
Meena

Kumar Suresh Singh notes that the Meenas have not abandoned their customary laws Meenas have better rights for women in many respects compared to many other Hindu castes.

=== Caste reservation ===
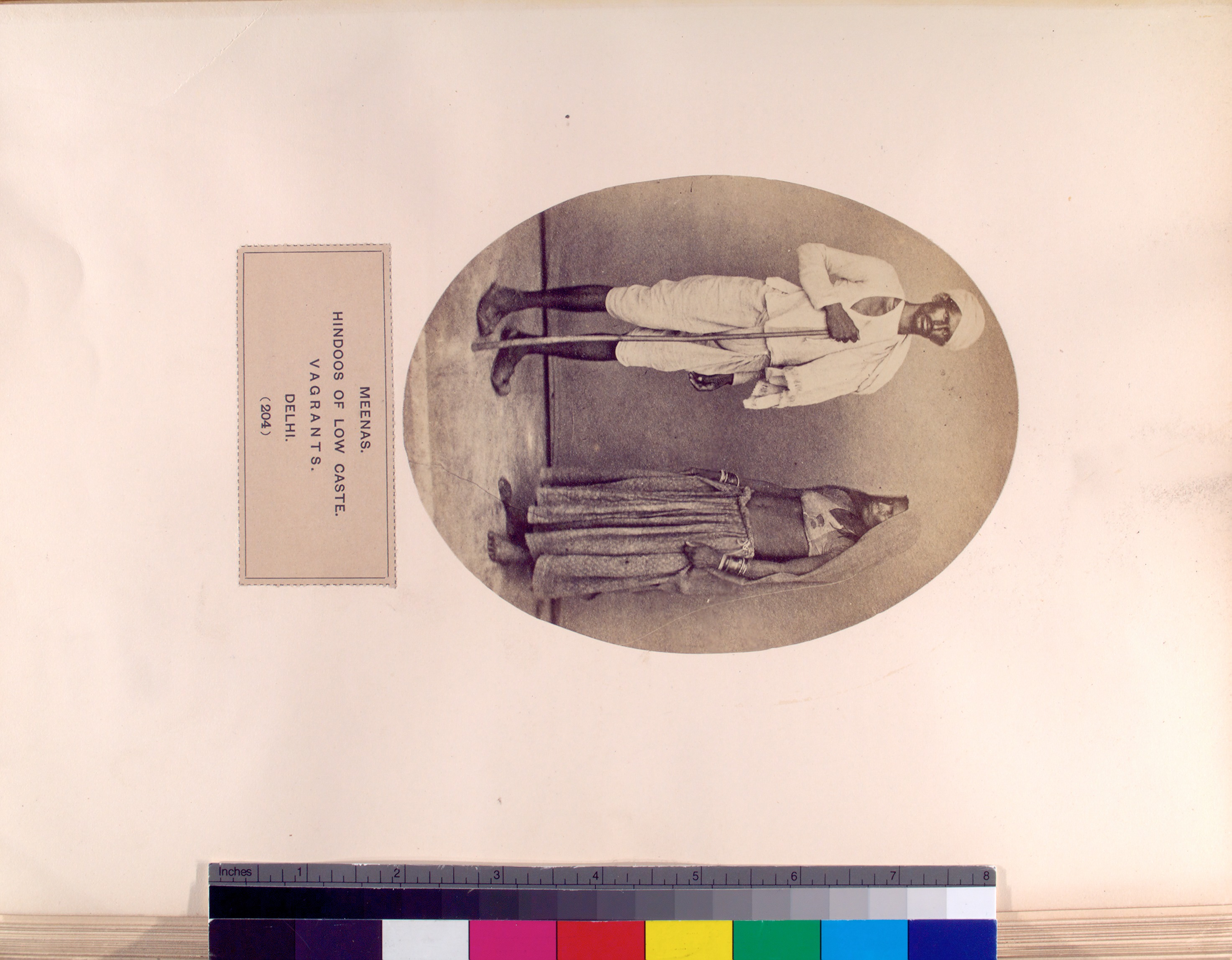
Meenas, Hindoos of low caste

The Meena fall into the Scheduled Tribe category in the state of Rajasthan and the majority of them are classified as being Hindu, but in Madhya Pradesh Meena are recognised as a Scheduled Tribe only in Sironj Tehsil, Vidisha, while in the other 44 districts of the state they are categorised as Other Backward Classes.

In Rajasthan, the Meena caste members oppose the entry of Gurjars into Scheduled Tribe fold, fearing that their own share of Scheduled Tribe reservation benefits will be eroded.

It is believed by media that the well-off Meena community enjoy a major share of ST reservation at the cost of other tribals.

== Subdivisions ==
The Meenas themselves are also a sub-group of Bhils.

The Meena tribe is divided into several clans and sub-clans (adakhs), which are named after their ancestors. Some of the adakhs include Ariat, Ahari, Katara, Kalsua, Kharadi, Damore, Ghoghra, Dali, Doma, Nanama, Dadore, Manaut, Charpota, Mahinda, Rana, Damia, Dadia, Parmar, Phargi, Bamna, Khat, Hurat, Hela, Bhagora, and Wagat.

Bhil Meena is another sub-division among the Meenas. As part of a sanskritisation process, some Bhils present themselves as Meenas, who hold a higher socio-economic status compared to the Bhil tribal people.

A sub-group known as "Ujwal Meena" (also "Ujala Meena" or "Parihar Meena") seek higher status, and claim to be Rajputs, thus distinguishing themselves from the Bhil Meenas. They follow vegetarianism, unlike other Meenas whom they designated as "Mailay Meena".

Other prevalent social groupings are Zamindar Meena and the Chaukidar Meena. The Zamindar Meena, comparatively well-off, are those who surrendered to powerful Rajput invaders and settled on the lands believe to be granted by the Rajputs. Those who did not surrender to Rajput rule and kept on waging guerrilla warfare are called the Chaukidar Meena.

== Culture ==
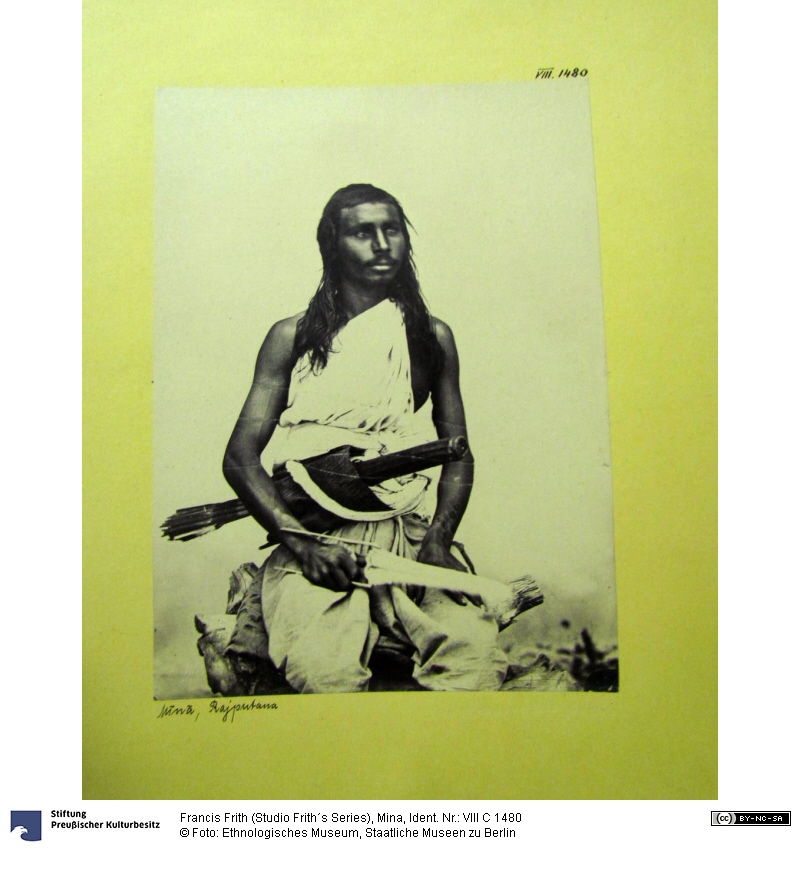
Mina

There is a custom in the Meenas to perform Pitra Tarpan after taking a collective bath on the day of Diwali. They adopt the culture of worshiping trees and plants in marriages, festivals and other ceremonies as per the Dharadi tradition. They worship different family deities according to the gotra. They celebrate Meenesh Jayanti on the third day of the Chaitra month's Shukla paksha.

=== Art ===
Mandana Paintings are widely practiced by the women of the Meena tribe.

== Demographics ==
According to the 2011 Census of India, the Meenas have a total population of 5 million. According to a report by Hindustan Times, the population of Meenas in Rajasthan is 7% of the state's population. And according to the report of a German news television Deutsche Welle, the Meenas constitute 10% of the population of the state of Rajasthan. Whereas according to a report by BBC Hindi, the population of Meenas is 14% of the state's population.

== See also ==
- Rajasthani people
- Susawat
