= California Penal Code =

Defines most criminal law, criminal procedure, and penal institutions in California

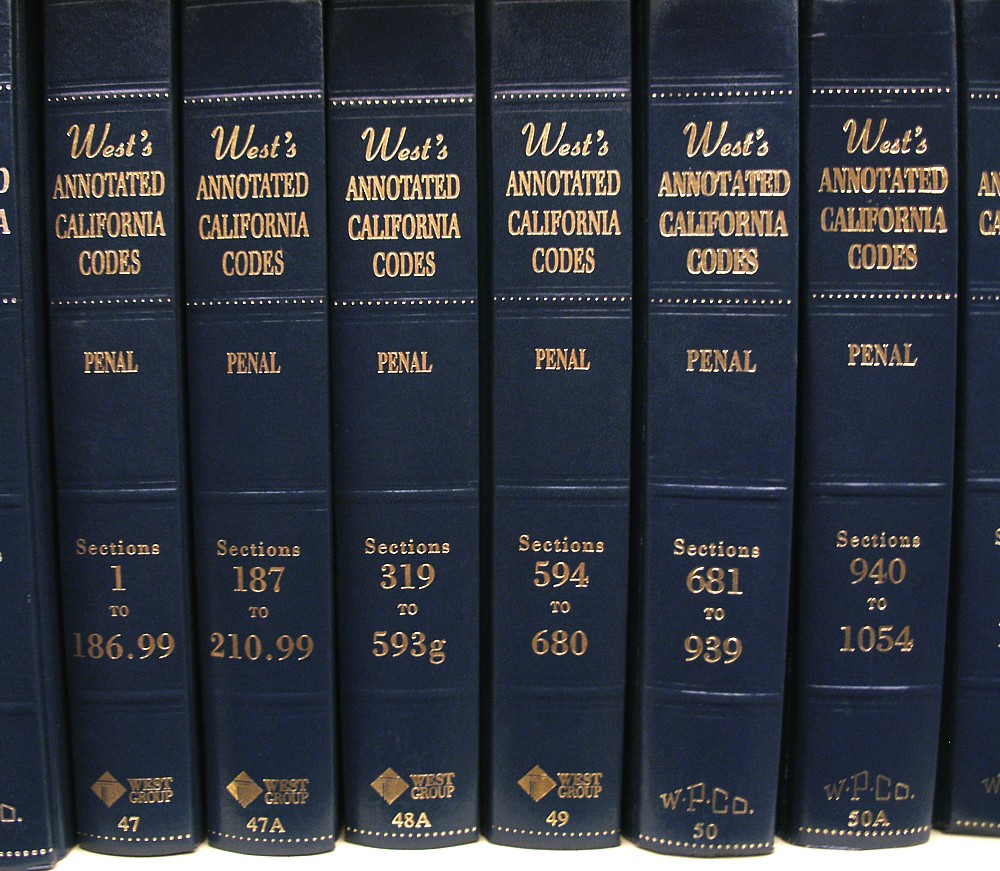
Volumes of the Thomson West annotated version of the California Penal Code; the other popular annotated version is Deering's, which is published by LexisNexis

The Penal Code of California forms the basis for the application of most criminal law, criminal procedure, penal institutions, and the execution of sentences, among other things, in the American state of California. It was originally enacted in 1872 as one of the original four California Codes, and has been substantially amended and revised since then.

== History ==
The Penal Code enacted by the California State Legislature in February 1872 was derived from a penal code proposed by the New York code commission in 1865 which is frequently called the Field Penal Code after the most prominent of the code commissioners, David Dudley Field II (who did draft the commission's other proposed codes). The actual drafter of the New York penal code was commissioner William Curtis Noyes, a former prosecutor. New York belatedly enacted the Field Penal Code in 1881.

Prior to the promulgation of the Model Penal Code in 1962, the Field Penal Code was by far the most broadly influential attempt at codification of criminal law, but was severely flawed in that it actually continued many muddled common law concepts (like malice aforethought) when the point of codification was to clean up the common law. About this, UC Berkeley law professor Sanford H. Kadish wrote in 1987: "None of the codes I have considered had a larger measure of influence. None deserved it less." Before the enactment of the Penal Code, California relied on common law definitions of crimes as well as the accumulated case law that went back to the British common law of post-colonial times.

== Organization ==
Like most of California's codes, the Penal Code is divided into parts, with the Penal Code containing six, most of which contain titles, some of which are in turn subdivided into chapters, with individual sections comprising the smallest unit of content. Unlike sections of the United States Code, any particular provision of the Penal Code is usually referenced by its section number alone, especially when a police officer in the state refers to a particular criminal act over their radio. Most of this article deals exclusively with the substantive criminal law set out in Part 1.

The first two titles of Part 1, up to Section 33, are preliminary and provide definitions of legal terms rather than definitions of, or punishments for, any specific crimes. The next group of titles, through Section 88, deal with crimes against the state itself, such as treason. Title 7, ending with Section 186, covers the state court system and crimes that can be committed therein, such as perjury. Title 8 covers the subject of violent crimes, and extends through Section 249. Title 9 (Sections 250 through 368) deals with offenses against public morals and decency. Title 10 (Sections 369 through 402) is devoted to "crimes against public health and safety," while Title 11 (Sections 403–423) is reserved for "crimes against the public peace." The topic of Title 12 (Sections 424–440) is crimes against public revenue, and of Title 13 (Sections 441 through 593), crimes against property. Title 14 (Sections 594–625) bears the heading "Malicious Mischief," but in addition to vandalism (Section 594), it also includes such offenses as trespassing (in Section 602). Title 15 (Sections 625–653) deals with "Miscellaneous Crimes," Title 16 (Sections 654-678) is labeled "General Provisions," and the last title of Part 1, Title 17 (679 and 680) delineates the "Rights of Victims and Witnesses of Crime."

Part 2 of the Penal Code (Sections 681–1020) codifies the state's criminal procedure system.

Part 3 of the Penal Code (Sections 2000–10007) codifies statutes governing the state's corrections system. Part 3 includes provisions governing the operation of the county jails and state prisons, as well as the administration of the death penalty.

Part 4 of the Penal Code (Sections 11006–14315) codifies statutes governing criminal investigations, prison officer training, police officer training, crime control, crime prevention, and gun control.

Part 5 of the Penal Code (Sections 15001–15003) consists of only two sections authorizing the California Peace Officers Memorial Foundation to establish and maintain a memorial to peace officers on the grounds of the state Capitol with private funds.

Part 6 of the Penal Code (Sections 16000–34370) codifies statutes dealing with the management of weapons.

California's drug laws are not found within the Penal Code at all, but in a separate enactment, the California Health and Safety Code. Likewise, provisions affecting motorists, motor vehicles, and traffic matters are contained in the California Vehicle Code.

== Notable section numbers ==
- 148 – Resisting/obstructing a police officer
- 187 – Murder
- 192 – Manslaughter
- 203 – Mayhem
- 207 – Kidnapping
- 211 – Robbery
- 215 – Carjacking
- 219 – Train wrecking (see, e.g. 2005 Glendale train crash)
- 236–237 – False imprisonment
- 240 – Assault
- 242 – Battery
- 245 – Assault with a deadly weapon (ADW, sometimes "great bodily injury," GBI) or with force likely to produce great bodily injury
- 261 – Rape
- 280 – Child abduction
- 285 – Incest
- 288 – Child molestation
- 314 – Indecent exposure
- 368 – Crimes Against Elders and Dependent Adults
- 415 – Disturbing the peace/mutual combat
- 417 – Brandishing a firearm
- 422 – Criminal threats
- 451 – Arson
- 459 – Burglary
- 470 – Forgery
- 484 – Theft or larceny
- 487 – Grand theft
- 488 – Petty theft
- 487 – Grand theft auto
- 496 – Receiving stolen property
- 503–515 – Embezzlement
- 518–527 – Extortion
- 528–539 – False personation and cheats
- 594 – Malicious mischief/vandalism
- 597 – Animal cruelty
- 602 – Trespassing
- 647(b) – Prostitution
- 647(f) – Public drunkenness or public intoxication
- 664 – Attempt (usually charged together with one of the above like 187 or 211; attempted murder was formerly covered in its own section, 217)
- 691 – Extortion

"420" for marijuana use is commonly but incorrectly believed to originate from the Penal Code. The actual Section 420 covers obstructing entry on public land.

One of the more controversial sections of the California Penal Code are the consecutive Sections 666 and 667; Section 666, known officially as petty theft with a prior – and colloquially, felony petty theft and makes it possible for someone who committed a minor shoplifting crime to be charged with a felony if the person had been convicted of any theft-related offense at any time in the past; and if the person so charged has two previous felony convictions (listed as serious or violent felonies ["strikeable" offenses]), this can result in a 25-years-to-life sentence under the state's three strikes law, which is found in Section 667.

The inclusion of felony petty theft within the three-strikes law, and for that matter, the three-strikes law itself, have sparked much debate both within and outside the state, and even beyond the United States. In 2003, the U.S. Supreme Court upheld the California three-strikes law against constitutional challenges in two cases where the third strike was a nonviolent crime – Ewing v. California, 538 U.S. 11 (2003), and Lockyer v. Andrade, 538 U.S. 63 (2003).

== See also ==
- Law of California
- Law of the United States
