= Habitual Criminals Act =

- Enacted: 1930

A Habitual Criminals Act is an act where, after a certain number of convictions for certain crimes, dependent upon severity, a person is sentenced to an additional term ranging from a number of years to life imprisonment.

== Example ==
The State of Washington defines its habitual criminals act as follows:

Every person convicted in this state of any crime of which fraud or intent to defraud is an element, or of petit larceny, or of any felony, who shall previously have been convicted, whether in this state or elsewhere, of any crime which under the laws of this state would amount to a felony, or who shall previously have been twice convicted, whether in this state or elsewhere, of petit larceny, or of any misdemeanor or gross misdemeanor of which fraud or intent to defraud is an element, shall be adjudged to be an habitual criminal and shall be punished by imprisonment in a state correctional facility for not less than ten years. Every person convicted in this state of any crime of which fraud or intent to defraud is an element, or of petit larceny, or of any felony, who shall previously have been twice convicted, whether in this state or elsewhere, of any crime which under the laws of this state would amount to a felony, or who shall previously have been four times convicted, whether in this state or elsewhere, of petit larceny, or of any misdemeanor or gross misdemeanor of which fraud or intent to defraud is an element, shall be punished by imprisonment in a state correctional facility for life.

== See also ==
- Three strikes law
- Habitual offender
