= Felony petty theft =

Felony petty theft is denotes a situation where a misdemeanor petty theft offense is elevated to the status of a felony despite not meeting statutory requirements regarding the minimum value for felony grand theft.

== Under California law ==
In California, felony petty theft is codified in the California Penal Code. Also known as petty theft with a prior, these statutes enumerate situations where a misdemeanor petty theft may be elevated to a felony offense due to past conduct.

Section 666.1, enacted through Proposition 36, provides that an individual with two or more prior convictions for a theft-related offense, including petty theft, may be charged with a felony for a third or subsequent theft-related offense. Under the statute, the offense of petty theft with a prior may still be charged as a misdemeanor, leaving the decision whether to prosecute as a felony or a misdemeanor within the discretion of the prosecuting agency.

For example, an individual with two prior convictions for misdemeanor shoplifting from thirty years prior may be charged with felony petty theft for a third offense, and sentenced to state prison, even if the amount does not exceed the threshold for a felony and all items are recovered and resold by the retailer.

Prior to Section 666.1's enactment through Proposition 36, Section 666 of the California Penal Code codified felony petty theft for those with enumerated prior offenses, including sex offenses and prior strike offenses. Thus, if an individual had a qualifying prior "serious" offense and a prior qualifying theft that resulted in a term of incarceration, they may be charged with a felony for any subsequent petty theft offense. However, the offense may still be charged as a misdemeanor subject to the discretion of the prosecuting agency.

== Penal Code § 666 interaction with "three strikes" law ==
Though Pen. Code § 666 has been on the books in California since 1972, its existence took on new importance after the state's voters approved a three strikes law in a 1994 referendum, when it appeared on the ballot as Proposition 184. In certain cases, a person with two prior felony convictions has been charged with a third felony for committing a minor shoplifting crime. If one of the two previous felony charges had involved stealing in any manner then the shoplifting conviction, thus upgraded to a felony, would result in a mandatory sentence of 25 years to life in prison under the three-strikes law.

In 1995, Jerry Dewayne Williams was sentenced to prison for 25 years to life for stealing a slice of pizza from a group of children. His five prior felony convictions included robbery and attempted robbery.

This scenario has aroused harsh criticism, not only throughout the United States, but also globally; several court challenges to its inclusion in the three-strikes law were pending as of 2004, but a ballot measure that would have eliminated it, known as Proposition 66, was rejected by California voters on November 2, 2004; the measure was opposed by most law-enforcement unions in the state, and also by Governor Arnold Schwarzenegger. The main complaint with Proposition 66 was that it would retroactively resentence all offenders convicted of third strike offenses, allowing violent criminals (who had served sentences for their previous crimes) to be released.

In 2012, a revised measure aimed at moderating the effects of the three-strikes rule, known as Proposition 36, was passed by voters. This required that, except where the offender had previously been convicted of rape, murder or child molestation, the third strike must be a "serious or violent" felony.

== Other states ==
Texas, Washington, Colorado, Connecticut, Indiana, Kansas, Nevada, North Dakota, Arkansas, Georgia, Maryland, Montana, New Jersey, New Mexico, North Carolina, Pennsylvania, South Carolina, Utah, Vermont, Wisconsin, Florida, Tennessee, Virginia, and Arizona have also enacted Three Strikes laws for habitual offenders, making petty larceny a felony if there have been prior convictions.
