= Tommy Lee Farmer =

Tommy Lee Farmer is an American convicted criminal who was the first person in the United States convicted under the Federal three-strikes law.

A native of Sioux City, Iowa, Farmer was the son of a minister and the brother of a college professor. In 1971 he was convicted of second degree murder in the killing of a veterinarian in Sioux City. After having spent most of his adult life in prison, Farmer was paroled and then subsequently arrested for a botched attempt to rob a convenience store in Eastern Iowa. In 1995, he became the first person in the United States to be sentenced under the Three-Strikes Law and received a life sentence. President Bill Clinton considered the Farmer sentencing to be such a landmark decision that he interrupted his vacation to make a press statement.
