= One strike, you're out =

Housing eviction policy

One strike, you're out, is a colloquial term for a policy which allows tenants living in housing projects or otherwise receiving housing assistance from the federal government to be evicted if they, or any guest or visitor under their more-or-less direct control, engage in certain types of criminal activity on or, in some cases, even off the premises of said housing. This term is used because housing authorities do not have to offer a second chance. The term is apparently a back-formation of the "three strikes, you're out" concept embodied in the mandatory sentencing laws for repeat criminal offenders that began to be enacted in various American states in the 1990s.

== History ==
The Anti-Drug Abuse Act of 1988 predated One Strike, You're Out, and outlined eligibility requirements public housing authorities were to use to screen candidates. Legislation mandating the eviction of tenants whose dwelling units are the scene of criminal actions was passed by the United States Congress in 1996 and signed by President Bill Clinton. In his 1996 State of the Union Address, President Clinton laid the foundation for the One Strike policy: "I challenge local housing authorities and tenant associations: Criminal gang members and drug dealers are destroying the lives of decent tenants. From now on, the rule for residents who commit drug crimes and peddle drugs should be one strike and you're out. I challenge every state to match federal policy to assure that serious violent criminals serve at least 85 percent of their sentence." The provisions of the law took effect gradually and were essentially fully in place nationwide by 1998.

== Components of the policy ==
The policy was drafted by Housing and Urban Development Secretary Henry Cisneros, as a part of the Housing Opportunity Extension (“HOPE”) Act of 1996. Six months following the creation of the policy 3,847 people were evicted from various housing projects across the country. Public housing projects saw an 84% increase in the number of evictees six months prior to the signing of the law. While many types of crime are covered by the law, the vast majority of the evictions pursued under it have involved acts of physical and sexual violence and the sale and/or possession of illicit drugs.

In theory, the offending tenant is banned for life from receiving any form of federal public housing assistance, but a mechanism exists for the evictee to apply for reinstatement after three years (with no guarantee that this application or any future such application, will be granted). Individual states are also permitted to opt out of the law or modify its provisions as they see fit such as by imposing a temporary rather than a lifetime ban or limiting the ban to certain offenses.

== Challenges to the policy ==
In January 2001, the Ninth Circuit Court of Appeals declared the law to be unconstitutional in cases where the criminal wrongdoing in question was actually committed not by the tenant but by a person not legally residing in the unit, such as the tenant's grown child or guest. Rucker v. Davis concerned a 63-year-old grandmother, Pearlie Rucker, who was evicted because a member of her family had incurred a drug conviction. The court held that the federal statute that allowed the Oakland Housing Authority to evict Rucker should not be interpreted to allow the eviction of a tenant merely because of the wrongdoing of another.

However, the Ninth Circuit's en banc ruling was overturned in 2002 by the United States Supreme Court in HUD v. Rucker. Chief Justice William Rehnquist, writing for a unanimous Court (with Justice Stephen Breyer having recused himself), held that "the plain language of [the statute] requires leases that grant public housing authorities the discretion to terminate tenancy without regard to the tenant’s knowledge of the drug-related criminal activity."

== Criticisms ==
The law has encountered fierce opposition from African-American groups, and advocates for the poor in general. Some critics have argued that because evictions are civil proceedings and not criminal, less evidence is needed to prove a case against a tenant. Additionally, opponents have pointed out the aspect of the policy that allows housing authorities to evict tenants based on the actions of their relatives and guests.

Between 2003 and 2007, Representative Barbara Lee of California, attempted to amend One Strike You're Out with legislation intended to address this common criticism. H.R. 1309, H.R. 173 and H.R 1429 would exempt elderly tenants and those who were not aware of such criminal activity, from being evicted or denied admissions into a housing project. All three bills died in committee.

== Other applications ==
Since the passage of the public-housing law that forms the basis for this article, the term "One strike, you're out" has also acquired other popular applications, including the idea that the Roman Catholic Church should defrock priests upon the first sustained allegation of child molestation, and also to denote a proposed law in Washington that would mandate a life prison sentence for anyone convicted of any of several sexually motivated crimes against children; known as Initiative 861, it failed to gather enough signatures to qualify for the ballot in 2004.

== See also ==
- Eviction in the United States
- Zero tolerance
