= Street law =

Street Law, Inc
- Established: 1972; 54 years ago
- Founded at: Georgetown University (Georgetown University Law Center)
- Headquarters: 1010 Wayne Avenue, Suite 860, Silver Spring, Maryland 20910
- Location: USA
- Coordinates: 38.993645°N 77.027964°W
- Website: streetlaw.org/

Street law is a global program of legal and civics education geared at secondary school students. Street law is an approach to teaching practically relevant law to grassroots populations using interactive teaching methodologies. Elements of practical law taught include awareness of human rights/civil rights, criminal breaches and transgression, democratic principles, conflict resolution, the advocacy process, criminal and civil law, employment and labor law, family law, and consumer rights.

== History ==
The street law approach began in 1972 when Georgetown University Law Center developed a program that sent law students into high schools in Washington, DC to teach practical law lessons to high school students. Street Law, Inc., an outgrowth of the Georgetown program, develops and implements practical law education programs around the world. Street Law, Inc. is a 501(c)(3) non-profit organization. Its main offices are located in Silver Spring, Maryland, USA.

== Organizational structure ==
Although street law traces its founding to Georgetown Law, it has spread to many law schools globally. Neither Georgetown Law nor Street Law, Inc. exercise vertical or indirect control over local street law programs. Within U.S. law schools, street law is typically run as a legal clinic or experiential learning module, where law students receive law school academic credit for participation. At other law schools, street law is run as a student organization or as an extracurricular activity, typically under direct faculty supervision.

In recent years, some law societies have adopted a model which sees street law run across their jurisdiction. Examples include Ireland and Scotland.

== Pedagogical methodology ==
One core street law module is a teaching program wherein law students are sent into community schools to teach high school students age-appropriate lessons in the law. Within the U.S., this means that second and third-year law students are paired with secondary school classes where they regularly teach courses on law and legal subjects. There is significant autonomy and differentiation in the way that street law is taught nationally in the U.S. and globally, and street law expressly encourages law schools and law students to experiment with different teaching methodologies to account for different learning styles depending on age, culture, regional and state differences, and so on.

Other street law approaches include: teaching legal life skills to underserved populations; teacher professional development courses; partnerships with the legal community (both law firm and corporate) to teach about the law and legal careers to secondary students; teaching about rule of law, democracy and civil rights to populations in countries outside of the US; and publishing teaching resources.

== Teaching resources ==
Among other publications, McGraw-Hill has published a high school social studies textbook using this approach.

McGraw-Hill has also published a high school government textbook co-authored by Street Law, Inc.

McGraw-Hill also publishes Street Law: Understanding Law and Legal Issues, an informative law-based, civic learning text for use in the community college program.

== See also ==
- Centre for Clinical Legal Education (Palacký University, Faculty of Law)
- Legal clinic
- Legal awareness
