= Three-strikes law =

Law providing more severe penalties for repeat offenders

In the United States, habitual offender laws—commonly referred to as three-strikes laws—require a person who is convicted of an offense and who has one or two other previous serious convictions to serve a mandatory life sentence in prison, with or without parole depending on the jurisdiction. The purpose of the laws is to increase the punishment of those who continue to commit offenses after being convicted of one or two serious crimes. They are part of the United States Justice Department's Anti-Violence Strategy.

Twenty-eight states have some form of a "three-strikes" law. A person accused under such laws is referred to in a few states (notably Connecticut and Kansas) as a "persistent offender", while Missouri uses the unique term "prior and persistent offender". In most jurisdictions, only crimes at the felony level qualify as serious offenses, with some jurisdictions further restricting qualifying offenses to only include violent felonies.

The three-strikes law significantly increases the prison sentences of persons convicted of a felony who have been previously convicted of two or more violent crimes or serious felonies, and limits the ability of these offenders to receive a punishment other than a life sentence.

The expression "Three strikes and you are out" is derived from baseball, where a batter has three chances to either hit a pitched ball or earn an error called a "strike." After three "strikes" the batter strikes out and their chance to score is over.

The U.S. is not the only country to have this law. New Zealand has also enacted a form of the law.

== History ==
The practice of imposing longer prison sentences on repeat offenders (versus first-time offenders who commit the same crime) is present throughout most of American history, as judges often take into consideration prior offenses when sentencing. However, there is a more recent history of mandatory prison sentences for repeat offenders. For example, New York State had a long-standing Persistent Felony Offender law dating back to the early 20th century (partially ruled unconstitutional in 2010, but reaffirmed en banc shortly after). But such sentences were not compulsory in each case, and judges had much more discretion as to what term of incarceration should be imposed.

During Prohibition the state of Michigan enacted one of the harshest laws against bootlegging in the nation. The law required a life sentence for those violating liquor laws for the fourth time. In late 1928 Etta Mae Miller, a mother of four was found guilty under this law, sparking outrage.

The first true "three-strikes" law was passed in 1993, when Washington voters approved Initiative 593. California passed its own in 1994, when their voters passed Proposition 184 by an overwhelming majority, with 72% in favor and 28% against. The initiative proposed to the voters had the title of Three Strikes and You're Out, referring to de facto life imprisonment after being convicted of three violent or serious felonies which are listed under California Penal Code section 1192.7.

The concept swiftly spread to other states, but none of them chose to adopt a law as sweeping as California's. By 2004, twenty-six states and the federal government had laws that satisfy the general criteria for designation as "three-strikes" statutes—namely, that a third felony conviction brings a sentence of 20 to life where 20 years must be served before becoming parole eligible.

Three-strikes laws have been cited as an example of the McDonaldization of punishment, in which the focus of criminological and penological interest has shifted away from retribution and treatment tailored to the individual offender and toward the control of high-risk groups based on aggregations and statistical averages. A three-strikes system achieves uniformity in punishment of criminals in a certain class (viz., three-time offenders) in a way that is analogous to how a fast food restaurant achieves uniformity of its product.

== Eugenics Movement ==
Although Three Strikes laws are associated with the "tough on crime" period in the 1980s-1990s, their origins can be traced to the "Habitual Offender" laws. These laws were first seen in the 1990s and were tied with the eugenics movement. They believed that criminal behavior was inherited, passed down from parent to kid. This ideology allowed for many to justify forced sterilization and lengthy prison sentence.

== Enactment by states ==
The following states have enacted three-strikes laws:

- New York has employed a habitual felon statute since 1797.
- North Carolina has had a law dealing with habitual felons since 1967, but the law was amended in 1994 and now means that a third conviction for any violent felony (which includes any Class A, B, C, D or E Felony) will result in a mandatory sentence of life imprisonment without parole.
- Maryland has had a habitual felon statute for violent offenders since 1975. The law was amended in 1994, meaning that a fourth conviction for a crime of violence mandates a sentence of life imprisonment without parole.
- Alabama has had a habitual felon statute for serious and violent felons since 1977, providing for up to life imprisonment, and includes a mandatory life sentence without parole for three or more felony convictions if at least one of these was for an offense classified as a Class A Felony (10–99 years or life).
- Delaware has had a three-strikes law providing up to life imprisonment for serious felonies since 1973, when the Delaware Criminal Code, contained under Part I, Title 11 of the Delaware Code, became effective.
- Texas has had a three-strikes with mandatory life sentence since at least 1952.
  - In Rummel v. Estelle (1980), the US Supreme Court upheld Texas's statute, which arose from a case involving a refusal to repay $120.75 paid for air conditioning repair that was, depending on the source cited, either considered unsatisfactory or not performed at all, where the defendant had been convicted of two prior felony convictions, and where the total amount involved from all three felonies was around $230.
- In 1993: Washington
- In 1994: California, Colorado, Connecticut, Indiana, Kansas, Maryland, New Mexico, North Carolina, Virginia, Louisiana, Wisconsin, and Tennessee. Tennessee is one of the few states, together with Georgia, Florida, Montana and South Carolina, that mandates life without parole for two or more convictions for the most serious violent crimes, including murder, rape, aggravated cases of robbery, sexual abuse or child sexual abuse, etc.
  - California's original Proposition 184 was later modified by 2012 California Proposition 36. In 2003, a sentence under the law was upheld in Ewing v. California.
- In 1995: Arkansas, Florida, Montana, Nevada, New Jersey, North Dakota, Pennsylvania, Utah, Georgia and Vermont. Georgia has a "two strikes" law, also known as the "seven deadly sins" law, which mandates a sentence of life imprisonment without parole for two or more convictions of murder, rape, armed robbery, kidnapping, aggravated sexual battery, aggravated sodomy, or aggravated child molestation or any combination of those offenses. In 1995, Montana also enacted a two strikes law during this period and has since mandated life imprisonment without parole for any person convicted a second time of deliberate homicide, aggravated kidnapping, sexual intercourse without consent, sexual abuse of a child or ritual abuse of a minor. A three strikes law in the state also exists for lesser crimes, such as aggravated assault, mitigated kidnapping and robbery. This means that a third conviction of any such crimes also mandates life without parole.
- In 1996: South Carolina. South Carolina also has a "two strikes" law for crimes known as a "most serious offense", which are crimes like murder, rape, attempted murder, armed robbery, etc. whereas, the "three strikes" law applies to "serious offenses" which are many drug offenses, other violent crimes like burglary, robbery, arson, etc. and even serious nonviolent crimes like insurance fraud, forgery, counterfeit, etc. Two convictions or three convictions under these provisions or any combination of these will automatically result in a sentence of life in prison without the possibility of parole. The South Carolina "two strikes" law is similar to Georgia's seven-deadly-sins law.
- Florida passed HB 1371, the Prisoner Release Reoffender Act, in May 1997, which in of itself is a "two-strikes" law. The Florida "two strikes law" dictates that individuals convicted of certain categories of crime who reoffend within three years is subject to life in prison without parole, even if this is only a second offense, gaining the distinction of, "one of the strictest sentencing laws in the U.S.".
- In 2006: Arizona
- In 2012: Massachusetts
- In 2012: Michigan In 2012, Michigan's legislature passed Senate Bill 1109, enacting Public Act 319 amending Section 769.12 of the Code of Criminal Procedure. More commonly referred to as the three strikes law, the change updated sentencing guidelines to crack down on habitual offenders, specifically habitual felony offenders. This took effect on October 1, 2012. While it is commonly referred to as the three strikes law, that name is misleading. The law actually applies to an individual convicted of a fourth felony. The new law exposes the individual who is convicted of a fourth felony offense to a mandatory minimum prison sentence of at least 25 years. The law also allows for extending the maximum sentence.

Georgia, South Carolina, Montana and Tennessee are the only states in the United States to date that have "two strikes" laws for the most serious violent crimes, such as murder, rape, serious cases of robbery, etc. and they all mandate a sentence of life imprisonment without parole for a conviction of any such crimes a second time around.

== Application ==
The exact application of the three-strikes laws varies considerably from state to state, but the laws call for life sentences for at least 25 years on their third strike. In the state of Maryland, any person who receives their fourth strike for any crime of violence will automatically be sentenced to life imprisonment without parole.

Most states require one or more of the three felony convictions to be violent crimes in order for the mandatory sentence to be pronounced. Crimes that fall under the category of "violent" include: murder, kidnapping, sexual abuse, rape, aggravated robbery, and aggravated assault.

Some states include additional, lesser offenses that one would not normally see as violent. For example, the list of crimes that count as serious or violent in the state of California is much longer than that of other states, and consists of many lesser offenses that include: firearm violations, burglary, simple robbery, arson, providing hard drugs to a minor, and drug possession. As another example, Texas does not require any of the three felony convictions to be violent, but specifically excludes certain "state jail felonies" from being counted for enhancement purposes.

One application of a three-strikes law was the Leonardo Andrade case in California in 2009. In this case, Leandro Andrade attempted to rob $153 in videotapes from two San Bernardino K-Mart stores. He was charged under California's three-strikes law because of his criminal history concerning drugs and other burglaries. Because of his past criminal records, he was sentenced to 50 years in prison with no parole after this last burglary of K-Mart. Although this sentencing was disputed by Erwin Chemerinsky, who represented Andrade, as cruel and unusual punishment under the 8th Amendment, the Supreme Court ruled in support for the life sentencing.

In 1995, Sioux City, Iowa native Tommy Lee Farmer, a professional criminal who had served 43 years in prison for murder and armed robbery was the first person in the United States to be convicted under the federal three-strikes law when he was sentenced to life in prison for an attempted robbery at an eastern Iowa convenience store. He was prosecuted by Stephen J. Rapp, a US Attorney appointed by Clinton. The sentencing was considered so significant that President Bill Clinton interrupted a vacation to make a press statement about it.

Another example of the three-strikes law involves Timothy L. Tyler who, in 1992 at age 24, was sentenced to life in prison without parole when his third conviction (a federal offense) triggered the federal three-strikes law, even though his two prior convictions were not considered violent, and neither conviction resulted in any prison time served. Tyler's sentence was commuted by President Barack Obama in 2016.

== Effects ==
=== United States ===
Analyzing the effect of the Three-Strikes legislation as a means of deterrence and incapacitation, a 2004 study found that the Three-Strikes Law did not have a very significant effect on deterrence of crime, but also that this ineffectiveness may be due to the diminishing marginal returns associated with having pre-existing repeat offender laws in place.

Another study found that arrest rates in California were up to 20% lower for the group of offenders convicted of two-strike eligible offenses, compared to those convicted of one-strike eligible offenses. The study concluded that the three-strikes policy was deterring recidivists from committing crimes. California has seen a reduction in criminal activity, and "Stolzenberg and D’Alessio found that serious crime in California’s 10 largest cities collectively had dropped 15% during the 3-year post-intervention period".

A study written by Robert Parker, director of the Presley Center for Crime and Justice Studies at UC Riverside, states that violent crime began falling almost two years before California's three-strikes law was enacted in 1994. The study argues that the decrease in crime is linked to lower alcohol consumption and lower rates of unemployment.

A 2007 study from the Vera Institute of Justice in New York examined the effectiveness of incapacitation under all forms of sentencing. The study estimated that if US incarceration rates were increased by 10 percent, the crime rate would decrease by at least 2 percent. However, this action would be extremely costly to implement.

Another study found that three-strikes laws discourage criminals from committing misdemeanors for fear of a life prison sentence. Although this deters crime and contributes to lower crime rates, the laws may possibly push previously convicted criminals to commit more serious offenses. The study's author argues that this is so because under such laws, felons realize that they could face a long jail sentence for their next crime regardless of type, and therefore they have little to lose by committing serious crimes rather than minor offenses. Through these findings, the study weighs both the pros and cons for the law.

A 2015 study found that three-strikes laws were associated with a 33% increase in the risk of fatal assaults on law enforcement officers.

=== New Zealand ===
In 2010, New Zealand enacted a similar three-strikes law called the Sentencing and Parole Reform Act 2010. The bill was sponsored by Police and Corrections Minister Judith Collins from the ruling National Party. It was passed into law by the National and ACT parties but was opposed by the opposition Labour and Green parties, and National's support partner, the Māori Party. While the Sentencing and Parole Act was supported by conservative groups such as the Sensible Sentencing Trust, critics attacked the law for promoting penal populism and disproportionately targeting the Māori community.

In early June 2018, an attempt by the Labour-led coalition government to overturn the Sentencing and Parole Act was blocked by Labour's support partner New Zealand First and the opposition National and ACT parties. NZ First had indicated its opposition to overturning the three-strikes bill, prompting the Justice Minister, Andrew Little, to abandon the attempt.

On 11 November 2021, the Minister of Justice Kris Faafoi announced that the Government was introducing legislation to repeal the Sentencing and Parole Reform Act. On 9 August 2022, the New Zealand Parliament passed the Three Strikes Legislation Repeal Bill, which repealed the Sentencing and Parole Reform Act. The repeal legislation was supported by the Labour, Green, and Māori parties but was opposed by the National and ACT parties, who moved to reinstate three-strikes legislation in April 2024 after being re-elected in 2023.

On 13 December 2024, the New Zealand Parliament passed legislation reinstating a three-strikes sentencing regime in New Zealand. The law was supported by the National, ACT and New Zealand First parties but was opposed by the opposition Labour, Green parties and Te Pāti Māori.

== Criticism ==
Some criticisms of three-strikes laws are that they clog the court system with defendants taking cases to trial in an attempt to avoid life sentences, and clog jails with defendants who must be detained while waiting for these trials because the likelihood of a life sentence makes them a flight risk. Life imprisonment is also an expensive correctional option, and potentially inefficient given that many prisoners serving these sentences are elderly and therefore both costly to provide health care services to and statistically at low risk of recidivism. Dependents of prisoners serving long sentences may also become burdensome on welfare services.

Prosecutors have also sometimes evaded the three-strikes laws by processing arrests as parole violations rather than new offenses, or by bringing misdemeanor charges when a felony charge would have been legally justified. There is also potential for witnesses to refuse to testify, and juries to refuse to convict, if they want to keep a defendant from receiving a life sentence; this can introduce disparities in punishments, defeating the goal of treating third-time offenders uniformly. Sometimes a non-violent felony also counts as a third strike, which thus would result in a disproportionate penalty. Three-strikes laws have thus also been criticized for imposing disproportionate penalties and focusing too much on street crime rather than white-collar crime.

Another criticism that the 3-strike law faces is the harshness of the law in certain states, such as California. California's 3-strike law was viewed to be the harshest in all the states. After an incarcerated individual faces their first felony, they usually have to have a second felony or serious violent crime for the 2nd strike of the 3-strike law to take place. But in California, any second crime, even if it is a misdemeanor, can result in the 2nd strike being put in place. This results in an extension of their sentence. Before 2012, the 3rd strike resulted in a minimum of 25 years to life imprisonment, no matter the 3rd crime in California. California's laws are criticized for this because, although you could have a felony on your record, one more illegal action, a felony or a small misdemeanor, will result in a longer sentence in prison.

The 3-strike law contributes to more long-term crime. When someone with 2 previous strikes gains a 3rd strike or another felony, even if it is a minor misdemeanor, their sentence is automatically 25 years to a life sentence to try to reduce them from committing any sort of crime again. But in reality, they are more likely to lash out and act more violently. Since there is already such a detrimental sentence at stake, offenders are more likely to resist arrest, try to get rid of a potential witness, and more likely to use violence to try to get out of the current situation they are in.

The 3-Strike law is also criticized for its long and short-term effects on murder victims as well as those who have been incarcerated for felony murder. These laws can lead to people being influenced to commit violent crimes to conceal their involvement with a crime, especially if it is a 2nd or 3rd offense (strike). These incarcerated individuals are more likely to commit murder to hide their participation when dealing with a second offense. It has been found that the 3-strike law is linked to 10-12% more homicides in the short run and close to 23-24% felony homicides in most of the states that enforce these 3-strike laws.

== See also ==
- 10-20-Life
- Armed Career Criminal Act
- Baumes law, 1926 four strike law
- Deterrence
- First Step Act
- Habitual offender laws, a comparison of similar laws in several countries
- Habitual Criminals Act
- HADOPI law
- Incapacitation (penology)
- Indefinite prison sentence
- Mandatory sentencing
- One strike, you're out
- Prison-industrial complex
- Recidivism
- Stanford Law School Criminal Defense Clinic
- United States Federal Sentencing Guidelines
