= Habitual offender =

Person convicted of a crime who was previously convicted of crimes

A habitual offender, repeat offender, or career criminal is a person convicted of a crime who was previously convicted of other crimes. Various states and jurisdictions may have laws targeting habitual offenders and specifically providing for enhanced or exemplary punishments or other sanctions. They are designed to counter criminal recidivism by physical incapacitation via imprisonment.

The nature, scope, and type of habitual offender statutes vary, but generally they apply when a person has been convicted twice for various crimes. Some codes may differentiate between classes of crimes (for example, some codes only deal with violent crime) and the length of time between convictions. Usually, the sentence is greatly enhanced; in some circumstances, it may be substantially more than the maximum sentence for the crime.

Habitual offender laws may provide for mandatory sentencing—in which a minimum sentence must be imposed, or may allow judicial discretion in allowing the court to determine a proper sentence.

== In specific jurisdictions ==
=== Australia ===
In Australia, various states and territories have adopted habitual offender legislation.

==== New South Wales ====
Under the provisions of the Habitual Criminals Act 1957 (NSW), an offender can be designated a habitual criminal and given an additional protective sentence of between five and 14 years' imprisonment. The offender must be at least 25 years of age, have served sentences for at least two indictable offenses, and the sentencing judge must decide that preventive detention is required to protect the public.

==== Tasmania ====
An offender who is at least 17 years of age and has been convicted of at least two violent or sexual offences can be declared a dangerous offender and detained indeterminately. A judge must consider the potential of future harm that could be caused by offenders, the circumstances of their offenses, medical and psychiatric opinion and any other matters of relevance. The decision passed by the court is not reviewable; the indeterminate sentence(s) commence upon the expiration of any determinate sentence imposed and release is by way of an order from the Supreme Court.

==== Western Australia ====
The Criminal Code Act 1913 (WA) and the Crimes (Serious and Repeat Offenders) Act 1992 (WA) contain provisions for the indeterminate incarceration of youths and adults convicted of particular offenses. The indeterminate sentence(s) commence upon the expiration of any determinate sentence imposed, and release is through a Supreme Court Order or at the discretion of the Governor.

==== Northern Territory and South Australia ====
The Criminal Code Act 1983 (NT) and the Sentencing Act 2017 (SA) allow for the indeterminate incarceration of a person who is determined to be a habitual criminal and/or incapable of controlling their sexual urges.

In South Australia, the indeterminate sentence(s) commence upon the expiration of any determinate sentence imposed, and are reviewed every three years after that. Release is only by way of an order from the Supreme Court.

In the Northern Territory, a prisoner serving indefinite sentence(s) has a nominal sentence set at 70% of the sentence that would have been imposed if the prisoner were not dangerous, 20 years (25 years in some circumstances) if the sentence imposed would have been one or more consecutive sentences of life imprisonment, or any other term as is fixed by the court. The indeterminate sentence(s) must be reviewed by the court when the nominal sentence (the minimum term the offender would have been required to serve if they were not dangerous) has expired, and every three years after.

==== Australian Capital Territory, Queensland, and Victoria ====
The Sentencing Act 2005 (ACT), the Dangerous Prisoners (Sexual Offenders) Act 2003 (Qld), and the Sentencing Act 1991 (Vic) govern habitual offenders. An offender can be incarcerated indeterminately if there is a high probability, given the offender's character, the nature of their offense, psychiatric evidence as to the dangerousness of the defendant, and any other relevant circumstances, that the offender poses a serious threat to the community. The indeterminate sentence(s) must be reviewed by the court when the nominal sentence (the minimum term the offender would have been required to serve if they were not dangerous) has expired, and every three years after.

The minimum nominal sentence that can be imposed is ten years, but the sentencing judge can extend this if they believe that the prisoner's criminal history and/or the nature of the prisoner's offending warrants it.

The longest nominal sentence on sentence(s) of indeterminate imprisonment is 30 years, currently being served by serial pedophile Geoffrey Robert Dobbs (Queensland), who pleaded guilty to 124 sexual offences and one count of attempting to pervert the course of justice committed against 63 girls aged between one month and 15 years, including five family members and girls under his care as a teacher and youth leader, between 1972 and 2000.

=== Canada ===
In Canada, the Habitual Offender Act in Canada dealt with multiple offenders. The law was repealed after a Law Commission Report of 1969 found it to be erratically applied and was often used against non-violent and non-dangerous offenders. In 1977, Part XXIV of the Criminal Code was enacted for habitual offenders, providing for indeterminate or determinate sentences for offenders found to be dangerous who would be eligible for parole after three years and has the authority to extend such indeterminate non-parole period at any time.

=== France ===
From 2007 to 2014, France had peines planchers (literally "floor sentences"), which set a minimum floor to the sentences of recidivist offenders.

Enacted under President Nicolas Sarkozy, they were repealed under his successor François Hollande, which made this point a part of his platform.

=== Germany ===
Based on earlier reform plans, the National Socialist regime issued in 1933 the so-called Gewohnheitsverbrechergesetz against 'criminals by habit'; not only was the punishment raised, it also introduced a preventive detention to be reconsidered every three years. After 1945, the Allied military governments did not contest this law, and its regulations were taken over in 1953 into the German penal code Strafgesetzbuch. In 1969, the liberalization of civil and penal law made it more difficult to impose preventive detention and other measures. Contrary to US law, the discretion lies with the sentencing judge.

=== Hungary ===
In Hungary, the Fidesz-dominated new parliament changed the Penal Code, introducing a habitual criminal statute for repeat offenders and acts of recidivism on June 8, 2010. The change has been signed into law. The law is codified under Sections 89 and 90 of the Hungarian Criminal Code. The law explicitly denies parole for any person convicted of certain serious offences, including murder, that was a repeat offender at the time of the offence. Moreover, the law mandates a sentence of life imprisonment for any person that is a repeat offender of any offences that would exceed twenty years, or if any of the offenses carry a maximum sentence of life imprisonment.

=== India ===
The Criminal Tribes Act was enacted in 1871 and the adult males coming under this act were required to report to police stations weekly and restrictions on their movement was imposed. It was initially enacted only in North India, but with subsequent amendments in 1876, 1911 and 1924, it was applied to entire India. Communities under this act were defined as "addicted to the systematic commission of non-bailable offences". After independence in 1947, the leaders and social reformers paid attention to this problem, and in 1949, the Central government appointed a committee to study the utility of the existence of this law. The committee viewed that the act was against the spirit of the Indian Constitution, and recommended suitable steps to be taken for amelioration of the pitiable conditions of the Criminal Tribes rather than stigmatising them as criminals.

As a result, the Criminal Tribes Act of 1871 was repealed in 1952 and the Habitual Offenders Act was enacted in its place.

According to the Habitual Offenders Act, a habitual offender is one who has been a victim of subjective and objective influences and has manifested a set practice in crime, and also presents a danger to the society in which they live.

=== Pakistan ===
Section 75 of the Pakistan Penal Code deals with Habitual Offenders. The provisions are activated upon a second conviction for a crime with a minimum sentence of three years' imprisonment. The Guidelines for sentencing given to criminal court indicate that the discretion lies with the judge, and an enhanced sentence is not mandatory, and should usually not be given in less serious criminal cases (such as petty theft) or where the convictions are old. The judge is expected to adopt an individualized view and tailor both the decision of awarding an enhanced sentence and the length of it to the case at hand. For this the transcripts of the previous trials can be used.

=== United States ===
In the United States, several state governments have passed laws which require the state courts to hand down a mandatory and extended sentences to habitual offenders (for example, making the repeated commission of the same misdemeanor a felony). Three strikes laws specifically target those who have been convicted of a serious criminal offense on three or more separate occasions.

== Criticism ==
There has been various criticism of Habitual Offender Laws. Some examples are included below.

=== Unjust and unusual results ===
Habitual Offender laws, depending on their scope and discretionary room given to judges, can lead to persons being punished quite severely for relatively minor offenses. The discretionary nature of the laws means that they can be applied unevenly.

In Australia, laws relating to dangerous and Habitual offenders have been criticized as ignoring the principle of certainty in sentencing. Another major concern in Australia is the considerable disparity that exists in the requirements for dangerous offender status and in the available sentences for such offenders across jurisdictions. Age and offense requirements, indeterminate or fixed sentencing provisions, and review procedures are quite different from state to state; these inconsistencies have been removed to some extent in the past decade.

Some unusual scenarios have arisen, particularly in California in the United States—the state punishes shoplifting and similar crimes involving over $500 in property as felony petty theft if the person who committed the crime has a prior conviction for any form of theft, including robbery or burglary. As a result, some defendants have been given sentences of 25 years to life in prison for such crimes as shoplifting golf clubs (Gary Ewing, previous strikes for burglary and robbery with a knife), nine videotapes (Leandro Andrade, 50 years to life for two counts of shoplifting), or, along with a violent assault, a slice of pepperoni pizza from a group of children (Jerry Dewayne Williams, four previous non-violent felonies, sentence later reduced to six years on appeal), some have even been sentenced to life without parole for non-violent crimes (Alice Marie Johnson, and Alvin Kennard).

=== Undue prosecutorial leverage ===
Habitual Offender laws also give prosecutors more power to force a defendant to plea bargain, as often the only deviation from a mandatory minimum sentence is with prosecutor approval.

=== Compatibility with fundamental rights ===
The laws have been challenged on the basis of violating fundamental rights.

In the US on March 5, 2003, the U.S. Supreme Court held by a 5–4 majority that such sentences do not violate the Eighth Amendment of the U.S. Constitution, which prohibits "cruel and unusual punishment".

== See also ==
- Aggravation (legal concept)
