= Legal clinic =

Legal aid or law school program providing services

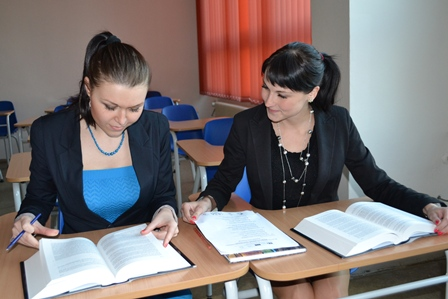
Students working on a case in a student's legal aid office, Palacky University

A legal clinic (also law clinic or law-school clinic) is a legal aid or law-school program providing services to various clients and often hands-on legal experience to law students. Clinics are usually directed by clinical professors. Legal clinics typically conduct pro bono work, providing free legal services to clients.

Legal clinics originated as a method of practical teaching of law students, but today they also encompass free legal aid with no academic links. Some practice-based law clinics with no academic link provide hands-on skills to lawyers, judges, and non-lawyers on practical dimensions of the law while offering legal services to clients.

== Goals, objectives and methods ==
In a law-school clinic, students typically provide assistance with research, drafting legal arguments, and meeting with clients. In many cases, professors will appear for oral argument before courts. However, many jurisdictions have "student practice" rules that permit law-clinic students to appear and argue in court.

== Need and importance ==
Some scholars in some jurisdictions have questioned the quality of that legal representation in cases where parties cannot afford a lawyer and are provided legal services by the state. Law-school clinics provide other options to such clients.

== Areas of service ==
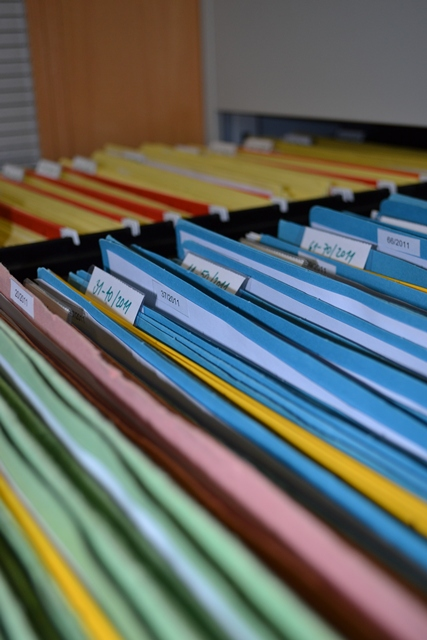
Legal clinic - case files at Palacký University Faculty of Law Legal Clinic

Clinical legal studies operate in many areas, including immigration law, environmental law, intellectual property, housing, criminal defense, criminal prosecution, American Indian law, human rights, and international criminal law. Clinics sometimes sue companies and government entities, which has led to pushback in courts and legislatures, including attempts to put limits on whom clinics can sue without losing state subsidies.

== Obstacles ==
While many jurisdictions have "student practice" rules that allow law-clinic students to appear and argue in court, in some countries like India law students cannot represent clients in court.

According to some scholars, clinical legal education fails to meet its goals because it lacks resources. Other scholars have highlighted the educational capabilities of even low-cost legal clinics.

== Notable legal clinics ==
=== United States ===
- Harvard Legal Aid Bureau
- Stanford Law School Three Strikes Project
- Supreme Court Clinic
- Tulane Environmental Law Clinic
- Yale Law School Supreme Court Clinic

== See also ==
- Legal aid
- Legal awareness
- Legal education
- Street law

== Bibliography ==
- Djemila Carron, Nesa Zimmermann & Vista Eskandari, "Pédagogies cliniques et critiques: penser les rapports de pouvoir dans l'enseignement du droit", Cliniques juridique 5, https://www.cliniques-juridiques.org/revue/volume-5-2021/pedagogies-cliniques-et-critiques-penser-les-rapports-de-pouvoir-dans-lenseignement-du-droit/
- Valériane Thool & Geneviève Dufour, "L’évaluation dans les cliniques juridiques : quelques réflexions sur l’appréciation de l’acquisition des compétences", Cliniques juridiques 6, https://www.cliniques-juridiques.org/revue/volume-6-2022/levaluation-dans-les-cliniques-juridiques-quelques-reflexions-sur-lappreciation-de-lacquisition-des-competences/
