= List of Scheduled Castes in Uttar Pradesh =

This articles contains a list of Scheduled Castes communities and their population according to the 2011 Census of India in Uttar Pradesh.

== List ==
1. Agariya (excluding Sonbhadra district)
2. Badhik
3. Badi
4. Baheliya
5. Baiga (excluding Sonbhadra district)
6. Baiswar
7. Bajaniya
8. Bajgi
9. Balahar
10. Balai
11. Balmiki
12. Bangali
13. Banmanus
14. Bansphor
15. Barwar
16. Basor
17. Bawariya
18. Beldar
19. Beriya
20. Bhantu
21. Bhuiya (excluding Sonbhadra district)
22. Bhuyiar
23. Boria
24. Chamar, Dhusia, Jhusia, Jatava
25. Chero (excluding Sonbhadra and Varanasi districts)
26. Dabgar
27. Dhangar
28. Dhanuk
29. Dharkar
30. Dhobi
31. Dom
32. Domar
33. Dusadh
34. Gharami
35. Ghasiya
36. Gond (excluding Mehrajganj, Sidharth Nagar, Basti, Gorakhpur, Deoria, Mau, Azamgarh, Jonpur, Balia, Gazipur, Varanasi, Mirzapur and Sonbhadra districts)
37. Gual
38. Habura
39. Hari
40. Hela
41. Kalabaz
42. Kanjar
43. Kapariya
44. Karwal
45. Khairaha
46. Kharwar [ (excluding Benbansi) (excluding Deoria, Balia, Gazipur, Varanasi and Sonbhadra districts) ]
47. Khatik
48. Khorot
49. Kol
50. Kori
51. Korwa
52. Lalbegi
53. Majhwar
54. Mazhabi
55. Musahar
56. Nat
57. Pankha (excluding Sonbhadra and Mirzapur districts)
58. Parahiya (excluding Sonbhadra district)
59. Pasi, Tarmali
60. Patari (excluding Sonbhadra district)
61. Rawat
62. Saharya (excluding Lalitpur district)
63. Sanaurhiya
64. Sansiya
65. Shilpkar
66. Turaiha

== Demography ==
=== Community wise ===
Scheduled Castes		Population	
Code	Castes	SC pop (2011)	%age of total
001	Agaria	5,803	0.014
002	Badhik	9,018	0.022
003	Badi	11,028	0.026
004	Baheliya	1,43,442	0.347
005	Baiga	17,387	0.042
006	Baiswar	17,920	0.043
007	Bajaniya	2,611	0.006
008	Bajgi	886	0.001
009	Balahar	5,029	0.013
010	Balai	1,200	0.002
011	Balmiki	13,19,241	3.189
012	Bangali	38,035	0.092
013	Banmanus	24,185	0.058
014	Bansphor	59,804	0.145
015	Barwar	18,105	0.044
016	Basor	1,29,885	0.314
017	Bawariya	7,223	0.017
018	Beldar	1,89,614	0.458
019	Beriya	46,455	0.112
020	Bhantu	11,807	0.028
021	Bhuiya	18,055	0.043
022	Bhuiyar	28,360	0.068
023	Boria	4,558	0.011
024	Chamar, Dhusia, Jhusia, Jatav	2,24,96,047	54.393
025	Chero	596	0.001
026	Dabgar	7,000	0.017
027	Dhangar	43,806	0.106
028	Dhanuk	6,51,335	1.579
029	Dharkar	1,13,515	0.274
030	Dhobi	24,32,610	5.882
031	Dom	1,10,353	0.267
032	Domar	24,581	0.059
033	Dusadh	2,30,593	0.557
034	Gharami	37	<0.001
035	Ghasiya	5,888	0.014
036	Gond	21,992	0.053
037	Gual	340	<0.001
038	Habura	6,015	0.014
039	Hari	3,643	0.008
040	Hela	52,314	0.126
041	Kalabaz	11,199	0.027
042	Kanjar	1,15,968	0.280
043	Kapariya	20,205	0.049
044	Karwar	7,183	0.017
045	Khairaha	892	0.002
046	Kharwar [excluding Benbasi]	14,796	0.035
047	Khatik	9,30,554	2.250
048	Khorot	1,219	0.002
049	Kol	4,22,042	1.020
050	Kori	22,93,937	5.546
051	Korwa	1,563	0.003
052	Lalbegi	560	0.001
053	Majhwar	23,123	0.056
055	Mazhabi	14,192	0.034
056	Musahar	2,57,135	0.621
056	Nat	2,14,344	0.518
057	Pankha	916	0.002
058	Parahiya	2,446	0.006
059	Pasi, Tadmali	65,22,166	15.769
060	Patari	366	<0.001
061	Rawat	2,13,326	0.516
062	Sahariya	23,644	0.0571
063	Sanaurhiya	47	<0.001
064	Sansiya	5,689	0.013
065	Shilpkar	26,706	0.064
066	Turaiha	28,055	0.068
Generic castes, etc. (members who listed them as Dalit, Harijan, or Anusuchit Jati)		19,08,659	4.639
		41,357,608	100%

=== Religion wise ===
Scheduled Castes	Religious community			
Castes	Total (2011)	Hinduism	Sikhism	Buddhism
Agaria	5,803	5,791	10	2
Badhik	9,018	8,989	4	25
Badi	11,028	11,015	12	1
Baheliya	1,43,442	1,43,393	20	29
Baiga	17,387	17,385	0	2
Baiswar	17,920	17,896	22	2
Bajaniya	2,611	2,611	0	0
Bajgi	886	876	10	0
Balahar	5,029	5,023	6	0
Balai	1,200	1,200	0	0
Balmiki	13,19,241	13,18,265	401	575
Bangali	38,035	38,020	12	3
Banmanus	24,185	24,180	2	3
Bansphor	59,804	59,787	13	4
Barwar	18,105	18,079	1	25
Basor	1,29,885	1,29,815	8	62
Bawariya	7,223	7,220	3	0
Beldar	1,89,614	1,89,559	30	25
Beriya	46,755	46,737	11	7
Bhantu	11,807	11,796	5	6
Bhuiya	4,095	4,092	1	2
Bhuiyar	28,360	28,352	6	2
Boria	4,558	5,544	0	14
Chamar, Dhusia, Jhusia, Jatav	2,24,96,047	2,23,71,352	10,930	1,13,765
Chero	596	588	0	8
Dabgar	7,000	6,990	7	3
Dhangar	43,806	43,758	9	39
Dhanuk	6,51,335	6,50,956	181	218
Dharkar	1,13,515	1,13,416	36	63
Dhobi	24,32,610	24,31,257	471	882
Dom	1,10,353	1,10,219	48	86
Domar	24,581	24,577	1	3
Dusadh	2,30,593	2,30,341	22	230
Gharami	37	37	0	0
Ghasiya	5,888	5,886	1	1
Gond	21,992	21,961	13	18
Gual	340	340	0	0
Habura	6,015	6,010	1	4
Hari	3,643	3,638	0	5
Hela	52,314	52,244	18	52
Kalabaz	11,199	11,197	1	1
Kanjar	1,15,968	1,15,927	33	8
Kapariya	20,205	20,203	0	2
Karwar	7,183	7,182	1	0
Khairaha	892	881	11	0
Kharwar [excluding Benbasi]	14,796	14,795	1	0
Khatik	9,30,554	9,29,993	262	299
Khorot	1,219	1,219	0	0
Kol	4,22,042	4,21,950	56	36
Kori	22,93,937	22,84,607	354	8,976
Korwa	1,563	1,563	0	0
Lalbegi	560	558	2	0
Majhwar	23,123	23,074	48	1
Mazhabi	14,192	3,671	10,517	4
Musahar	2,57,135	2,56,924	27	184
Nat	2,14,344	2,14,258	35	51
Pankha	916	915	0	1
Parahiya	2,446	2,441	4	1
Pasi, Tadmali	65,22,166	65,18,741	934	2,491
Patari	366	366	0	0
Rawat	2,13,326	2,13,221	35	70
Sahariya	23,644	23,622	11	11
Sanaurhiya	47	46	0	1
Sansiya	5,689	5,666	22	1
Shilpkar	26,706	25,700	979	27
Turaiha	28,055	28,053	1	1
Generic castes, etc.	19,18,664	18,97,598	2,126	8,935
	41,357,608	4,11,92,566	27,775	1,37,267

== See also ==
- List of Scheduled Tribes in Uttar Pradesh
