= List of Scheduled Castes in Uttarakhand =

There are 65 Scheduled Castes in the Indian state of Uttarakhand, with a population of 1,892,516, constituting 18.76% of the state's population according to the 2011 census.

== List of Scheduled Castes ==
1. Agariya
2. Badhik
3. Badi
4. Baheliya
5. Baiga
6. Baiswar
7. Bajaniya
8. Bajgi
9. Balahar
10. Balai
11. Balmiki
12. Bangali
13. Banmanus
14. Bansphor
15. Barwar
16. Basor
17. Bawariya
18. Beldar
19. Beriya
20. Bhantu
21. Bhuiya
22. Bhuyiar
23. Boria
24. Chamar, Dhusia, Jhusia, Jatava
25. Chero
26. Dabgar
27. Dhangar
28. Dhanuk
29. Dharkar
30. Dhobi
31. Dom
32. Domar
33. Dusadh
34. Gharami
35. Ghasiya
36. Gond
37. Gual
38. Habura
39. Hari
40. Hela
41. Kalabaz
42. Kanjar
43. Kapariya
44. Karwal
45. Khairaha
46. Kharwar (excluding Benbansi)
47. Khatik
48. Khorot
49. Kol
50. Kori
51. Korwa
52. Lalbegi
53. Majhwar
54. Mazhabi
55. Musahar
56. Nat
57. Pankha
58. Parahiya
59. Pasi, Tarmali
60. Patari
61. Saharya
62. Sanaurhiya
63. Sansiya
64. Shilpkar
65. Turaiha

== Distribution ==
=== Community-wise ===
S.No.	Caste	Population
1.	Agaria	3,239
2.	Badhik	313
3.	Badi	2,147
4.	Baheliya	3,539
5.	Baiga	179
6.	Baiswar	127
7.	Bajaniya	371
8.	Bajgi	23,732
9.	Balhar	79
10.	Balai	733
11.	Balmiki	1,12,383
12.	Bangali	22,015
13.	Banmanus	11
14.	Bansphor	653
15.	Barwar	462
16.	Basor	177
17.	Bawariya	81
18.	Beldar	519
19.	Beriya	149
20.	Bhantu	32
21.	Bhuiya	1,921
22.	Bhuiyar	4,796
23.	Boria	60
24.	Chamar, Dhusia, Jhusia, Jatav	5,48,813
25.	Chero	40
26.	Dabgar	36
27.	Dhangar	1,240
28.	Dhanuk	1,486
29.	Dharkar	216
30.	Dhobi	18,300
31.	Dom	30,140
32.	Domar	155
33.	Dusadh	2,759
34.	Gharami	171
35.	Ghasiya	418
36.	Gond	3,143
37.	Gual	1,128
38.	Habura	866
39.	Hari	340
40.	Hela	5
41.	Kalabaz	339
42.	Kanjar	4,689
43.	Kapariya	189
44.	Karwal	222
45.	Khairaha	246
46.	Kharwar (excluding Banvansi)	1,088
47.	Khatik	8,382
48.	Kharot	187
49.	Kol	11,977
50.	Kori	40,245
51.	Korwa	100
52.	Lalbegi	28
53.	Majhwar	827
54.	Mazhabi	6,038
55.	Musahar	718
56.	Nat	1,177
57.	Pankha	38
58.	Parahiya	56
59.	Pasi, Tarmali	19,432
60.	Patari	300
61.	Sahariya	88
62.	Sanaurhiya	502
63.	Sansiya	1,412
64.	Shilpkar	9,29,267
65.	Turahiya	4,411
Generic Castes, etc.		73,594

=== District-wise ===
District		Scheduled Castes		
Name	Total population	Population	Percent (in %)	Largest community (Top 3)
Uttarkashi	3,30,086	80,567	24.41	Shipkar (59,864); Bajgi (7,523); Dom (5,109)
Chamoli	3,91,605	79,317	20.25	Shilpkar (69,308); Dom (1,260); Balmiki (1,198)
Rudraprayag	2,42,285	47,679	19.68	Shilpkar (42,170); Dom (948); Kori (311)
Tehri Garhwal	6,18,931	1,02,130	16.50	Shilpkar (75,363); Bajgi (8,389); Dom (5,156)
Dehradun	16,96,694	2,28,901	13.49	Chamar, Jatav (66,954); Shilpkar (37,446); Balmiki (35,535)
Garhwal	6,87,271	1,22,361	17.81	Shilpkar (1,04,989); Chamar, Jatav (5,128); Balmiki (3,828)
Pithoragarh	4,83,439	1,20,378	24.90	Shilpkar (1,14,881); Balmiki (1,381); Chamar, Jatav (472)
Bageshwar	2,59,898	72,061	27.73	Shilpkar (66,398); Balmiki (338); Dom (133)
Almora	6,22,506	1,50,995	24.26	Shilpkar (1,41,165); Balmiki (3,067); Chamar, Jatav (330)
Champawat	2,59,648	47,383	18.25	Shilpkar (40,783); Chamar, Jatav (1,680); Balmiki (1,461)
Nainital	9,52,605	1,91,206	20.07	Shilpkar (1,56,176); Balmiki (9,595) Chamar, Jatav (9,052)
Udham Singh Nagar	16,42,908	2,38,264	14.50	Chamar, Jatav (1,24,991); Balmiki (21,105); Kori (16,687)
Haridwar	18,90,422	4,11,271	21.75	Chamar, Jatav (3,35,371); Balmiki (31,155); Shilpkar (6,068)
Total	10,086,292	18,92,516	18.76%	

=== Religion wise ===
Caste	Population	Religious community		
Caste	Population	Hinduism	Sikhism	Buddhism
Agaria	3,239	3,234	0	5
Badhik	313	312	1	0
Badi	2,147	2,142	5	0
Baheliya	3,539	3,538	1	0
Baiga	179	174	0	5
Baiswar	127	127	0	0
Bajaniya	371	361	0	0
Bajgi	23,732	23,724	0	8
Balhar	79	79	0	0
Balai	733	733	0	0
Balmiki	1,12,383	1,12,276	89	18
Bangali	22,015	22,000	10	5
Banmanus	11	11	0	0
Bansphor	653	653	0	0
Barwar	462	462	0	0
Basor	177	169	8	0
Bawariya	81	81	0	0
Beldar	519	519	0	0
Beriya	149	149	0	0
Bhantu	32	32	0	0
Bhuiya	1,921	1,921	0	0
Bhuiyar	4,796	4,788	8	0
Boria	60	60	0	0
Chamar, Dhusia, Jhusia, Jatav	5,48,813	5,47,540	680	593
Chero	40	40	0	0
Dabgar	36	36	0	0
Dhangar	1,240	1,240	0	0
Dhanuk	1,486	1,484	0	2
Dharkar	216	216	0	0
Dhobi	18,300	18,298	0	2
Dom	30,140	30,126	14	0
Domar	155	155	0	0
Dusadh	2,759	2,759	0	0
Gharami	171	171	0	0
Ghasiya	418	418	0	0
Gond	3,143	3,138	5	0
Gual	1,128	1,128	0	0
Habura	866	839	23	4
Hari	340	340	0	0
Hela	5	5	0	0
Kalabaz	339	339	0	0
Kanjar	4,689	4,687	0	2
Kapariya	189	189	0	0
Karwal	222	212	10	0
Khairaha	246	246	0	0
Kharwar (excluding Banvansi)	1,088	1,087	0	1
Khatik	8,382	8,378	2	2
Kharot	187	187	0	0
Kol	11,977	11,974	3	0
Kori	40,245	40,215	29	1
Korwa	100	100	0	0
Lalbegi	28	28	0	0
Majhwar	827	826	0	1
Mazhabi	6,038	303	5,716	19
Musahar	718	716	1	1
Nat	1,177	1,163	14	0
Pankha	38	12	26	0
Parahiya	56	56	0	0
Pasi, Tarmali	19,432	19,417	10	5
Patari	300	300	0	0
Sahariya	88	88	0	0
Sanaurhiya	502	502	0	0
Sansiya	1,412	1,412	0	0
Shilpkar	9,29,267	9,28,082	1,003	182
Turahiya	4,411	4,409	2	0
Generic Castes, etc.	73,594	73,228	308	58
	18,92,516	18,83,611	7,989	916

== See also ==
- List of Scheduled Tribes in Uttarakhand
