= Distribution of Scheduled Castes by district in Uttar Pradesh =

Here is a breakdown of the Scheduled Caste population by district in Uttar Pradesh as per 2011 census of India:

== Demographics ==
| District | | Scheduled Castes | | |
| Name | Population | Population | Percent | Largest three |
|---|---|---|---|---|
| Agra | 4,418,797 | 991,325 | 22.43 | Jatav (698,052), Balmiki (67,836), Kori (62,118) |
| Aligarh | 3,673,889 | 755,254 | 20.56 | Jatav (448,957), Khatik (60,867), Balmiki (56,371) |
| Ambedkar Nagar | 2,397,888 | 591,125 | 24.65 | Jatav (476,378), Dhobi (33,785), Pasi (8,519) |
| Amroha | 1,840,221 | 318,001 | 17.28 | Jatav (272,548), Balmiki (22,348), Dhobi (7,005) |
| Auraiya | 1,379,545 | 391,622 | 28.38 | Jatav (252,284), Dhanuk (44,728), Kori (25,369) |
| Ayodhya | 2,470,996 | 555,047 | 22.46 | Pasi (201,578), Kori (177,901), Jatav (82,033) |
| Azamgarh | 4,613,913 | 1,171,378 | 25.39 | Jatav (918,153), Pasi (99,181), Dhobi (37,634) |
| Badaun | 3,127,621 | 622,526 | 19.90 | Jatav (395,763), Dhobi (63,066), Balmiki (59,510) |
| Baghpat | 1,303,048 | 149,060 | 11.44 | Jatav (101,703), Balmiki (26,282), Khatik (1,328) |
| Bahraich | 3,487,731 | 509,307 | 14.60 | Jatav (209,787), Pasi (105,496), Kori (58,059) |
| Ballia | 3,239,774 | 494,698 | 15.27 | Jatav (312,313), Dusadh (58,793), Dhobi (29,732) |
| Balrampur | 2,148,665 | 277,212 | 12.90 | Kori (103,827), Pasi (57,096), Jatav (36,929) |
| Banda | 1,799,410 | 387,855 | 21.55 | Jatav (260,450), Kori (60,837), Dhobi (21,940) |
| Barabanki | 3,260,699 | 864,559 | 26.51 | Pasi (425,778), Jatav (263,468), Kori (36,030) |
| Bareilly | 4,448,359 | 557,150 | 12.52 | Jatav (285,956), Dhobi (75,649), Balmiki (57,756) |
| Basti | 2,464,464 | 513,959 | 20.85 | Jatav (390,962), Dhobi (48,518), Khatik (26,976) |
| Bhadohi | 1,715,183 | 353,103 | 20.58 | Jatav (212,174), Pasi (83,791), Musahar (15,264) |
| Bijnor | 3,682,713 | 787,444 | 21.38 | Jatav (664,676), Balmiki (42,135), Bhuiyar (18,353) |
| Bulandshahr | 3,499,171 | 725,600 | 20.74 | Jatav (543,381), Balmiki (59,751), Khatik (45,892) |
| Chandauli | 1,952,756 | 446,786 | 22.88 | Jatav (326,088), Dusadh (22,293), Musahar (21,222) |
| Chitrakoot | 991,730 | 266,655 | 26.89 | Jatav (151,148), Kol (51,175), Kori (21,944) |
| Deoria | 3,100,946 | 468,663 | 15.11 | Jatav (310,322), Dhobi (39,955), Dusadh (32,911) |
| Etah | 1,774,480 | 281,011 | 15.84 | Jatav (158,640), Dhobi (37,942), Balmiki (22,683) |
| Etawah | 1,581,810 | 388,283 | 24.55 | Jatav (230,849), Dhanuk (49,250), Kori (30,737) |
| Farrukhabad | 1,885,204 | 312,712 | 16.59 | Jatav (150,180), Dhanuk (46,449), Dhobi (35,459) |
| Fatehpur | 2,632,733 | 651,480 | 24.74 | Jatav (234,667), Pasi (219,797), Kori (58,899) |
| Firozabad | 2,498,156 | 473,890 | 19.01 | Jatav (274,968), Dhobi (43,436), Kori (40,211) |
| Gautam Buddha Nagar | 1,648,115 | 216,105 | 13.11 | Jatav (140,049), Balmiki (33,080), Kori (5,121) |
| Ghaziabad | 3,343,334 | 480,053 | 14.36 | Jatav (552,299), Balmiki (89,634), Kori (29,887) |
| Hapur | 1,338,311 | 293,410 | 21.92 | Jatav (552,299), Balmiki (89,634), Kori (29,887) |
| Ghazipur | 3,620,268 | 726,641 | 20.07 | Jatav (551,443), Dhobi (22,696), Musahar (22,130) |
| Gonda | 3,433,919 | 531,973 | 15.49 | Kori (216,696), Jatav (80,635), Pasi (77,925) |
| Gorakhpur | 4,440,895 | 936,061 | 21.08 | Jatav (551,785), Pasi (119,363), Beldar (81,785) |
| Hamirpur | 1,104,285 | 241,198 | 21.84 | Jatav (132,171), Kori (44,638), Basor (25,108) |
| Hardoi | 4,092,845 | 1,274,505 | 31.14 | Jatav (568,601), Pasi (517,705), Dhobi (61,376) |
| Hathras | 1,564,708 | 387,554 | 24.77 | Jatav (256,979), Dhobi (41,324), Kori (22,367) |
| Jalaun | 1,689,974 | 468,178 | 27.70 | Jatav (274,763), Kori (67,018), Dhobi (34,860) |
| Jaunpur | 4,494,204 | 990,345 | 22.03 | Jatav (682,060), Pasi (122,954), Dhobi (38,328) |
| Jhansi | 1,998,603 | 562,505 | 28.14 | Jatav (296,345), Kori (87,962), Dhobi (46,002) |
| Kannauj | 1,656,616 | 309,980 | 18.71 | Jatav (169,938), Dhanuk (50,321), Dhobi (24,909) |
| Kanpur Dehat | 1,796,184 | 460,544 | 25.64 | Jatav (263,241), Kori (51,509), Dhanuk (47,595) |
| Kanpur Nagar | 4,581,268 | 816,754 | 17.83 | Jatav (338,979), Kori (109,092), Pasi (100,867) |
| Kasganj | 1,436,719 | 254,229 | 17.69 | Jatav (163,835), Dhobi (35,198), Balmiki (22,696) |
| Kaushambi | 1,599,596 | 555,397 | 34.72 | Pasi (335,204), Jatav (105,054), Dhobi (37,990) |
| Kushinagar | 4,021,243 | 544,231 | 13.53 | Jatav (313,738), Dhobi (57,497), Musahar (34,843) |
| Lakhimpur Kheri | 3,564,544 | 1,061,782 | 29.79 | Jatav (427,978), Pasi (420,346), Dhobi (64,600) |
| Lalitpur | 1,221,592 | 240,519 | 19.69 | Jatav (168,109), Dhobi (25,808), Basor (18,107) |
| Lucknow | 4,589,838 | 948,294 | 20.66 | Pasi (330,333), Jatav (281,541), Rawat (120,751) |
| Maharajganj | 2,684,703 | 492,976 | 18.36 | Jatav (289,658), Dhobi (61,498), Pasi (61,038) |
| Mahoba | 875,958 | 220,898 | 25.22 | Jatav (142,036), Kori (25,611), Basor (24,180) |
| Mainpuri | 1,868,529 | 368,206 | 19.70 | Jatav (173,017), Dhanuk (76,260), Dhobi (45,869) |
| Mathura | 2,547,184 | 506,580 | 19.89 | Jatav (363,698), Balmiki (31,361), Kori (30,319) |
| Mau | 2,205,968 | 474,537 | 21.51 | Jatav (366,689), Dhobi (19,662), Khatik (18,671) |
| Meerut | 3,443,689 | 624,149 | 18.12 | Jatav (468,170), Balmiki (63,619), Khatik (14,617) |
| Mirzapur | 2,496,970 | 661,129 | 26.48 | Jatav (318,382), Kol (154,402), Pasi (47,372) |
| Moradabad | 3,126,507 | 367,120 | 11.74 | Jatav (567,243), Balmiki (64,538), Dhobi (32,239) |
| Sambhal | 1,578,213 | 364,286 | 16.56 | Jatav (567,243), Balmiki (64,538), Dhobi (32,239) |
| Muzaffarnagar | 2,869,934 | 561,250 | 19.56 | Jatav (419,594), Balmiki (58,896), Kori (23,670) |
| Shamli | 1,273,578 | 141,263 | 11.09 | Jatav (419,594), Balmiki (58,896), Kori (23,670) |
| Pilibhit | 2,031,007 | 333,558 | 16.42 | Jatav (119,926), Pasi (60,444), Dhobi (47,785) |
| Pratapgarh | 3,209,141 | 709,252 | 22.10 | Pasi (327,266), Jatav (249,075), Dhobi (30,687) |
| Prayagraj | 5,954,391 | 1,309,851 | 21.99 | Pasi (476,171), Jatav (442,938), Kol (136,068) |
| Rae Bareli | 3,405,559 | 1,041,420 | 30.58 | Pasi (572,111), Jatav (253,489), Kori (69,470) |
| Rampur | 2,335,819 | 307,936 | 13.18 | Jatav (205,052), Balmiki (31,224), Dhobi (26,223) |
| Saharanpur | 3,466,382 | 764,450 | 22.05 | Jatav (640,625), Balmiki (52,007), Kori (24,227) |
| Sant Kabir Nagar | 2,199,774 | 369,039 | 16.78 | Jatav (249,254), Beldar (49,629), Dhobi (34,434) |
| Shahjahanpur | 3,006,538 | 532,673 | 17.72 | Jatav (229,487), Dhobi (79,112), Pasi (58,193) |
| Shravasti | 1,117,361 | 189,334 | 16.94 | Pasi (78,209), Jatav (41,129), Kori (25,605) |
| Siddharthnagar | 2,559,297 | 408,763 | 15.97 | Jatav (271,095), Pasi (49,574), Dhobi (48,646) |
| Sitapur | 4,483,992 | 1,446,427 | 32.26 | Pasi (749,149), Jatav (525,845), Dhobi (71,825) |
| Sonbhadra | 1,862,559 | 421,661 | 22.64 | Jatav (217,580), Kol (70,202), Dhobi (26,020) |
| Sultanpur | 2,249,036 | 481,735 | 21.42 | Jatav (319,156), Kori (241,669), Pasi (174,353) |
| Amethi | 2,050,133 | 512,215 | 24.98 | Jatav (319,156), Kori (241,669), Pasi (174,353) |
| Unnao | 3,108,367 | 948,588 | 30.52 | Pasi (445,078), Jatav (325,301), Dhobi (54,234) |
| Varanasi | 3,676,841 | 486,958 | 13.24 | Jatav (325,036), Khatik (38,180), Dhobi (24,461) |
| Total | 199,812,341 | 41,357,608 | 20.69 | Jatav (22,496,047), Pasi (6,522,166), Dhobi (2,432,610) |

== See also ==
- List of Scheduled Castes in Uttar Pradesh
- List of Scheduled Castes in India
