= Kafalta massacre =

Caste violence in Uttarakhand

Kafalta killings
- Location: Kafalta, Almora, Uttar Pradesh (now Uttarakhand)
- Date: May 9, 1980; 46 years ago
- Attack type: Mob attack
- Weapons: Swords, Sticks
- Deaths: 19 (estimated), though some sources say 14
- Victim: Dalits of Shilpkar caste
- Perpetrator: Upper castes (of village)
- Motive: Caste prejudice
- Accused: around 50-60
- Verdict: Guilty, with life imprisonment
- Convictions: Murder, Voluntarily causing grievous hurt, Common criminal intention
- Convicted: 16

The Kafalta massacre, also known as the Kafalta Dalit killings, refers to caste-based violence in May 1980 that caused the murder of fourteen Dalits in Almora, Uttarakhand (formerly Uttar Pradesh). It is considered one of the worst caste-related incidents in India arising from prejudice against Dalits.

== Background ==
Kafalta is a small village in the Almora district of Uttarakhand, which was a part of Uttar Pradesh at that time. The village was primarily inhabited by upper caste Kumaoni Rajputs and Brahmins, with a few houses of Dalit communities like Bajgi and Koli. The region was heavily impacted by the caste system, with many incidences of Dalits being restricted from temples, mounting horses in wedding processions, and other activities.

== Incident ==
On May 9, 1980, a youth named Shyam Prakash residing in the neighbouring village of Kafalta was celebrating his wedding, and had his Baraat (wedding procession) passed from the village leading to the temple with his family members and other relatives. Shyam Prakash belonged to the Shilpkar family, who are part of the Dalit community. The villagers, belonging to upper-caste families, objected the procession, particularly Shyam Prakash mounting a horse. After the groom refused to dismount his horse and the wedding party retaliating, the members of upper castes gathered their men from villager and incited violence upon the groom and his side members.

Fearing violence and due to them being outnumbered, the groom's side members took shelter in a local house which was set on fire by the villagers, burning the six members alive. Many other members of the wedding procession, who were also Dalits, ran towards the field to save their lives, but were hunted down by the villagers, who attacked them with swords and canes. In total, fourteen members of the Dalits of Shilpkar caste were killed.

== Aftermath ==
A few days after the incident, the news reached to the Government of Uttar Pradesh through various news outlets reporting upon it. Then Chief Minister of Uttar Pradesh, V. P. Singh ordered a high level investigation on the case. The victims and their family members were provided security due to the vulnerability of the scheduled castes in the region. After the incident became notorious, it heightened tensions in the society, particularly among Dalits. The incident was also discussed in the Parliament of India, regarding the safety and right to dignity of Dalits in India in "How riding on horse lead to massacre of the 19 Harijans". The Kafalta village was visited by the then Prime Minister Indira Gandhi and President Neelam Sanjiva Reddy, who announced swift justice and compensation to victims. The former President of India, Zail Singh, also visited the place as the Home Minister to understand and address the issue.

The massacre was considered one of the most brutal instances of violence against the Dalits and a landmark moment for the government, and was one of the historic events that paved the way for the enactment of the Scheduled Caste and Scheduled Tribe (Prevention of Atrocities) Act in 1989. The incident made a heavy impact on the Scheduled caste community of India and contributed to Dalit emancipation and resistance against prejudice and injuctice in the Kumaon region.

=== Convictions ===
Initially, all the accused of the incident were acquitted by the Sessions Court and Allahabad High Court due to lack of evidence. Later in 1997, through a high level enquiry ordered by the Government, the Supreme Court sentenced 16 perpetrators to life imprisonment.
