= List of Scheduled Tribes in Uttar Pradesh =

The Scheduled Tribes in Uttar Pradesh comprise 15 tribes, with a population of 1,134,273, constituting 0.47% of the state's population according to the 2011 census. Until 2003, the recognized Scheduled Tribes in Uttar Pradesh were limited to five: Buksa, Bhotiya, Jaunsari, Raji, and Tharu. Subsequently, additional tribes were notified as Scheduled Tribes in the state, but their scheduled status is limited to specific districts.

== List of Scheduled Tribes ==
Scheduled Tribes		Total Population	
Code	Tribes	Pop (2011)	%age of Pop
001	Bhotiya	5,196	0.46
002	Buksa	4,710	0.41
003	Jaunsari	3,720	0.33
004	Raji	1,295	0.11
005	Tharu	1,05,291	9.28
Added later in the year 2003 (as per the Scheduled Castes and Scheduled Tribes Order, 2003)
006	Gond, Dhuria, Rajgond, Pathari, Nayaka (in the districts of Mehrajganj, Sidharth Nagar, Basti, Gorakhpur, Deoria, Mau, Azamgarh, Jonpur, Balia, Gazipur, Varanasi, Mirzapur and Sonbhadra)	5,69,035	50.16
007	Kharwar, Khairwar (in the districts of Deoria, Balia, Ghazipur, Varanasi and Sonbhadra)	1,60,676	14.16
008	Sahariya (in the district of Lalitpur)	70,634	6.23
009	Parahiya (in the district of Sonbhadra)	901	0.08
010	Baiga (in the district of Sonbhadra)	30,006	2.64
011	Pankha, Panika (in the districts of Sonbhadra and Mirzapur)	24,862	2.19
012	Agariya (in the district of Sonbhadra)	17,376	1.53
013	Patari (in the district of Sonbhadra)	132	>0.01
014	Chero (in the districts of Sonbhadra and Varanasi)	42,227	3.72
015	Bhuiya (in the district of Sonbhadra)	15,599	1.37
Generic tribes (for those who have identified them as Adivasi, Vanvasi, Giri-Jan)		82,613	7.28
		1,134,273	100%

== Distribution ==
District		Scheduled Tribes		
Name	Total Population	Population	Percent	Top 3 largest (by population)
Agra	4,418,797	7,255	0.164	Bhotia (958); Jaunsari (206); Tharu (40)
Aligarh	3,673,889	629	0.017	Bhotia (13); Buksa (12); Tharu (5)
Ambedkar Nagar	2,397,888	746	0.031	Gond (605); Tharu (23); Raji (4)
Amroha	1,840,221	164	0.008	Tharu (12); Raji (8); Jaunsari (7)
Auraiya	1,379,545	150	0.011	Tharu (7); Buksa (7)
Ayodhya	2,470,996	931	0.038	Tharu (83); Buksa (8); Jaunsari (4)
Azamgarh	4,613,913	9,327	0.202	Gond (8,400); Buksa (10); Tharu (7)
Badaun	3,127,621	58	0.002	Tharu (31); Bhotia (7); Jaunsari (5)
Baghpat	1,303,048	14	0.001	
Bahraich	3,487,731	11,159	0.319	Tharu (10,641); Bhotia (189); Jaunsari (3)
Ballia	3,239,774	110,114	3.399	Gond (83,564); Kharwar (18,577); Bhotia (8)
Balrampur	2,148,665	24,887	1.158	Tharu (24,030); Bhotia (25); Buksa (1)
Banda	1,799,410	163	0.009	Bhotia (79); Buksa (31); Tharu (15)
Barabanki	3,260,699	610	0.018	Tharu (171); Raji (164); Jaunsari (9)
Bareilly	4,448,359	3,227	0.072	Tharu (335); Bhotia (155); Jaunsari (33)
Basti	2,464,464	3,620	0.147	Gond (3,526); Tharu (11); Buksa (3)
Bhadohi	1,715,183	1,873	0.109	Gond (1,648); Kharwar (71); Chero (17)
Bijnor	3,682,713	3,058	0.083	Buksa (2,921); Bhotia (44); Jaunsari (41)
Bulandshahr	3,499,171	198	0.005	Buksa (81); Tharu (10); Bhotia (10)
Chandauli	1,952,756	41,725	2.137	Gond (20,098); Kharwar (18,333); Chero (2,900)
Chitrakoot	991,730	366	0.037	
Deoria	3,100,946	109,894	3.544	Gond (93,668); Kharwar (12,088); Raji (24)
Etah	1,774,480	140	0.008	Bhotia (14); Jaunsari (2)
Etawah	1,581,810	169	0.010	Tharu (36); Buksa (14); Bhotia (12)
Farrukhabad	1,885,204	230	0.012	Buksa (46); Raji (34); Bhotia (16)
Fatehpur	2,632,733	340	0.013	Tharu (103); Jaunsari (7); Bhotia (5)
Firozabad	2,498,156	2,565	0.102	Bhotia (244); Tharu (39); Jaunsari (13)
Gautam Buddha Nagar	1,648,115	2,215	0.134	Bhotia (134); Jaunsari (50); Tharu (54)
Ghaziabad	4,681,645	3,968	0.085	Tharu (143); Bhotia (117); Jaunsari (21)
Ghazipur	3,620,268	28,712	0.793	Gond (14,856); Kharwar (12,058); Raji (7)
Gonda	3,433,919	870	0.025	Tharu (168); Bhotia (5)
Gorakhpur	4,440,895	18,172	0.409	Gond (15,168); Tharu (323); Bhotia (10)
Hamirpur	1,104,285	474	0.043	Bhotia (367); Tharu (33); Buksa (22)
Hardoi	4,092,845	349	0.008	Bhotia (41); Tharu (41); Jaunsari (1)
Hathras	1,564,708	268	0.017	Bhotia (39); Jaunsari (7); Tharu (3)
Jalaun	1,689,974	832	0.049	Buksa (33); Tharu (26); Jaunsari (19)
Jaunpur	4,494,204	4,736	0.105	Gond (3,669); Buksa (31); Raji (14)
Jhansi	1,998,603	3,873	0.193	Tharu (75); Bhotia (63); Jaunsari (9)
Kannauj	1,656,616	15	0.001	
Kanpur Dehat	1,796,184	801	0.044	Tharu (599); Buksa (7); Bhotia (3)
Kanpur Nagar	4,581,268	3,753	0.082	Tharu (1,244); Buksa (327); Bhotia (138)
Kasganj	1,436,719	150	0.010	Bhotia (39); Tharu (16); Jaunsari (2)
Kaushambi	1,599,596	193	0.012	Tharu (139)
Kushinagar	4,021,243	80,269	1.996	Gond (64,234); Kharwar (15,599); Tharu (19)
Lakhimpur Kheri	3,564,544	53,375	1.497	Tharu (47,628); Jaunsari (2,673); Buksa (646)
Lalitpur	1,221,592	71,610	5.862	Saharya (70,634); Bhotia (97); Tharu (8)
Lucknow	4,589,838	7,506	0.163	Tharu (4,029); Raji (469); Bhotia (270)
Maharajganj	2,684,703	16,435	0.612	Gond (11,818); Tharu (3,721)
Mahoba	875,958	647	0.074	Bhotia (358); Buksa (17)
Mainpuri	1,868,529	478	0.025	Bhotia (5); Jaunsari (4)
Mathura	2,547,184	1,520	0.059	Bhotia (273); Jaunsari (103); Tharu (15)
Mau	2,205,968	22,915	1.039	Gond (21,924); Tharu (10)
Meerut	3,443,689	3,390	0.098	Bhotia (47); Tharu (41); Raji (17)
Mirzapur	2,496,970	20,132	0.806	Gond (18,278); Pankha (981); Tharu (29)
Moradabad	4,704,720	685	0.014	Bhotia (128); Tharu (124); Jaunsari (20)
Muzaffarnagar	4,143,512	317	0.007	Tharu (56); Buksa (10); Jaunsari (5)
Pilibhit	2,031,007	1,714	0.084	Tharu (1,010); Bhotia (298); Buksa (58)
Pratapgarh	3,209,141	723	0.022	Tharu (102)
Prayagraj	5,954,391	7,955	0.133	Tharu (1,190); Bhotia (71); Jaunsari (11)
Rae Bareli	3,405,559	1,756	0.051	Tharu (1,035); Bhotia (44); Buksa (24)
Rampur	2,335,819	358	0.015	Tharu (107); Jaunsari (17); Bhotia (17)
Saharanpur	3,466,382	980	0.028	Jaunsari (61); Tharu (18); Buksa (17)
Sant Kabir Nagar	2,199,774	1,593	0.072	Gond (1,028); Tharu (6); Buksa (5)
Shahjahanpur	3,006,538	508	0.017	Jaunsari (190); Tharu (99); Bhotia (91)
Shravasti	1,117,361	5,534	0.495	Tharu (4,768); Bhotia (36); Buksa (8)
Siddharthnagar	2,559,297	12,021	0.469	Gond (11,066); Tharu (125); Raji (68)
Sitapur	4,483,992	1,602	0.035	Raji (269); Buksa (131); Tharu (97)
Sonbhadra	1,862,559	385,018	20.671	Gond (171,099); Kharwar (82,000); Chero (39,255)
Sultanpur	4,299,169	696	0.016	Tharu (104); Bhotia (51); Buksa (14)
Unnao	3,108,367	2,926	0.094	Tharu (2,349); Buksa (6); Jaunsari (5)
Varanasi	3,676,841	28,617	0.778	Gond (24,376); Kharwar (1,950); Bhotia (69)
Total	199,812,341	1,134,273	0.567	

== See also ==
- List of Scheduled Castes in Uttar Pradesh
