= Kotwar =

Regions with significant populations
- India

Languages
- • Hindi

Religion
- • Hinduism 100%

Related ethnic groups
- • Panika • Sahariya • Bind

The Kotwar are a community found in the state of Uttar Pradesh in India. They are a sub-group of the Panika caste. The word Kotwar is a corruption of kotwal, which means a keeper of the castle in Hindi. They are said to have acquired the name because they were traditionally village watchmen. The Panika were a caste traditionally associated with weaving, and the change of occupation by the Kotwar led to them becoming a distinct endogamous sub-group of the Panika.

The Kotwar are one many former tribal communities that have now been incorporated into the Hindu caste system. They are now found mainly in the districts of Sonbhadra and Mirzapur. Their habitat is hilly undulating terrain, and extremely forested. They speak Hindi and have scheduled caste status. They are now a community of small- and medium-sized farmers. The Kotwar are Hindu, and have a number of tribal deities like Dulha Deo, Maharani Devi and Seetla Devi
