= Chirimar =

Hindu caste found in Haryana, India

The Chirimar are a Hindu caste found in the state of Haryana in India. They are also known as Baheliya.

== Origin ==
In Hindi, the word chiri means a bird and the suffix mar means to kill, so Chirimar means someone who kills or catches birds. The Chirimar are an occupational caste that were traditionally employed as hunters and trappers, and are one of the many gypsy-like semi-nomadic communities found in North India. They are said to have migrated from Uttar Pradesh in the 18th century, and are now found mainly in Ambala District. The Chirimar speak Hindi, with most understanding Haryanvi.

== Present circumstances ==
The Chirimar are strictly endogamous, and practice clan exogamy. Their main clans include the Banoudhiya, Pateria and Kattaha. Like other occupational castes, they have a fairly strong caste council, which deal with intra community disputes and enforces community norms. The Chirimar live in multi caste villages, occupying their distinct quarters.

Trapping and trading birds like various kinds of sparrows, pigeons and parrots and animals like rabbits remain the Chirimar main occupation. These are sold at local markets to wholesalers who belong mainly to the Baniya caste. Some are also employed as vegetable vendors and tailors. Their customs are similar to other Haryana Hindus.
