= Churel =

Female spirit in South and Southeast Asia

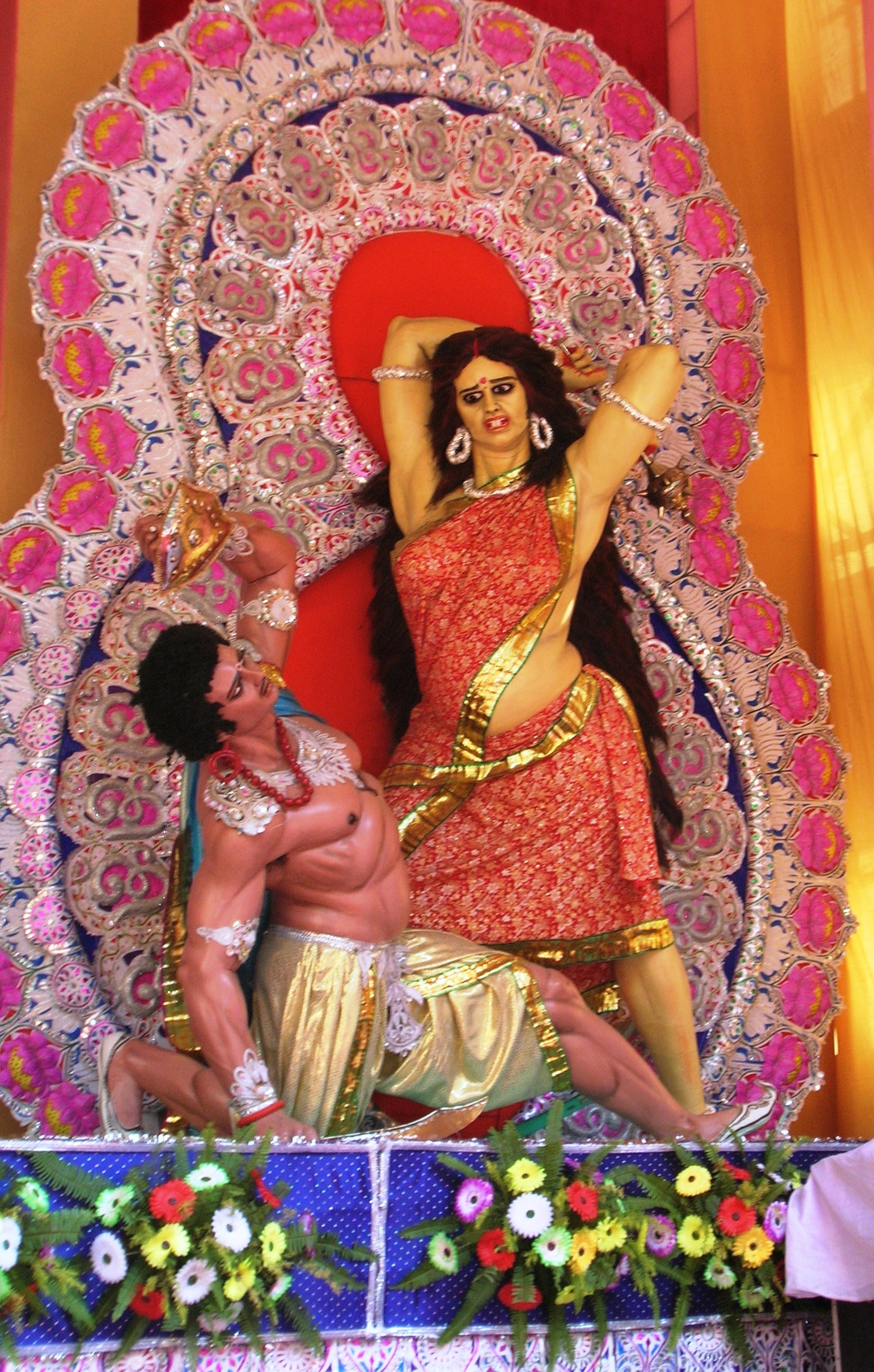
Within Hindu belief, churels may become dakinis and serve the goddess Kali.

The Churel, (Note: Hindi: चुड़ैल cuṛail, Urdu: چڑیل; Gujarati: ચૂડેલ cūḍel; Bengali: চুড়েল cuṛēl / পেত্নী pētnī / শাকচুন্নী śakcunnī; Nepali: किचकन्या kickanya / किचकण्डी kickaṇḍī / किचकन्नी kickannī), alternatively spelled Chudail, Churail, Chudel, Churreyl, or Churrail, also known as Petni and Shakchunni, is a mythical or legendary creature resembling a woman, which may be a demonical revenant said to occur in South Asia, Southeast Asia, and the Caribbean, particularly popular in India, Bangladesh, Nepal, Pakistan, Trinidad and Tobago, Guyana, and Suriname. The churel is typically described as "the ghost of an unpurified living thing", but because she is often said to latch on to trees, she is also called a tree-spirit. According to some legends, a woman who dies very cruelly will come back as a revenant churel for revenge, particularly targeting the males in her family.

The churel is mostly described as extremely ugly and hideous but is able to shape-shift and disguise herself as a beautiful woman to lure men into the woods or mountains where she either kills them or sucks up their life-force or virility, turning them into old men. Their feet are believed to be turned the other way around, so the toes face the direction of their back.

There are many folk remedies and folkloric sayings that elaborate on how to get rid of revenant and ghostly churels, and a number of measures that supposedly prevent churels from coming to life. The family of a woman who dies a traumatic, tragic, or unnatural death might perform special rituals fearing that the victimised woman might return as a churel. The corpses of suspected churels are also buried in a particular method and posture so as to prevent her from returning.

The churel is known as the Pichal Peri in the Punjab region of India and Pakistan, Petni/Shakchunni in the Bengal region, and Pontianak in Malaysia and Indonesia. The word "churel" is also often used colloquially or mistakenly for a witch in India and Pakistan. Churel have remained prevalent in modern-day literature, cinema, television, and radio, with many references to their activities. There may still be reports of sightings in rural regions in South-East Asia.

== Creation ==
The legend of Churel supposedly originated from Persia where they were described as being the spirits of women who died with "grossly unsatisfied desires".

In South-East Asia, the Churel is the ghost of a woman who either died during childbirth, while she was pregnant, or during the prescribed "period of impurity". The period of impurity is a common superstition in India where a woman is said to be impure during her period and the twelve days after she has given birth. According to some sources, in India, if a woman dies an unnatural death or during childbirth, especially during Diwali, she will become a Churel.

The Korwas of Mirzapur say that if a woman dies in a lying room (the place where women give birth) she becomes a Churel. The Pataris and Majhwars say that if a girl dies during pregnancy or when she is unclean she becomes a Churel and appears in the form of a pretty little girl in white clothes and seduces men away to the mountains; the only way to free those captured is to sacrifice a goat. The Bhuiya say that if a girl dies before she is twenty days old, she becomes a Churel.

In Punjab, though nobody has ever seen this, some people believe that if a man dies on a bed and after his death if no proper donation of some items relating to his bed is done, his soul becomes a Bhoot (ghost), and a woman becomes a Churel. The Kharwars believe that when the soul leaves the body, it becomes air but if it comes in contact with a person, the soul becomes troublesome. In western India, especially Gujarat, any woman who dies an unnatural death is believed to turn into a Churel, also known as jakihn, jakhai, mukai, nagulai and alvantin. Originally, it was believed that only a low-caste woman turns to a churel.

In West Bengal and Bangladesh, Petni/Shakchunni are formed when a woman dies unmarried or if she has unfulfilled desires.

== Appearance ==
The true form of a Churel is described as extremely ugly with saggy breasts, a black tongue, and thick rough lips although sometimes she is reported to have no mouth at all. She may have a pot belly, claw-like hands, and scruffy, long pubic-like hair. They are also described to have pig faces with large fangs or human-like faces with sharp tusks and long, wild hair. She is sometimes described as having a fair front and a black back, but she invariably has her feet turned backward.

A Churel may also be a shape-shifter. She can assume the form of a beautiful young woman, carrying a lantern with her head covered to charm any man she comes upon. The Patari and Majhwar think that she appears as a young girl in white clothes.

According to the poem Lalla Radha and The Churel, she takes the form of a lovely woman with alluring eyes but her appearance is marred by her backward turned feet.

The Petni/Shakchunni of West Bengal and Bangladesh wears traditional bangles made of shell (a sign of married women) and red and white sari.

== Activities ==
Churels are most often reported in and around cemeteries, cremation grounds, abandoned battlefields, thresholds of houses, crossroads, and toilets. If the Churel was one who died due to ill-treatment by family members, she avenges her early death by going for the males of her family, starting with the youngest. She would drain him of blood until he is shriveled up into an old man and then go for the next male. When all the males in her family are done, she moves on to other people. Any person who has seen a Churel can also be attacked by a deadly disease and those who answer to her night calls can end up dead.

In the poem Lalla Radha and the Churel, a priest warns the protagonist to not go near the Peepul trees because that is where the Churel lives and she might take him away and kill him. He still went to the Peepul tree and she called out to him in a sweet tone and seduced him until he went to her. Blinded by his desire, he did not notice that while he lay with her, his body seemed to get frailer until he died in a state of ecstasy. In The Female Element in Indian Culture, it says, "The Churel runs after and seeks to possess every man whom she meets, for, it is said, her carnal appetite remains unsatisfied in life". She also possesses girls during dances, causing a trance. According to Persian legend, when travelers saw the tracks of a Churel in the dirt they would try to flee by heading in the opposite direction, but her reversed feet would inevitably lead them right into her grasp. The Patari and Majhwar think that she appears to take her victims to the mountains and the only way they can be freed is if a goat is sacrificed.

The Churel sometimes singles out unmarried boys in their teens for their attention, then visits them at night to make love to them. If she does not leave the boy alone, he will become progressively weak until he dies in order to join her. She is also said to be always on the watch to attack other young mothers.

In the guise of the enchantress, this femme fatale hunts for young men on highways and seduces the lone traveller to accompany her. Sometimes, she imprisons him in her lair in the graveyard, sucking his blood a little at a time. Sometimes, she is described as feeding on his semen. Legend says that a churel will hold a young man captive until he is elderly, or else uses him sexually until he withers, dies, and joins the spirit. Another tale narrates that a young man who is seduced by the churel and eats the food given to him, returns at dawn to the village, turned into an aged man.

This demon also has associations with the various accounts of the Mother Goddess as well as the Rakshasi. Within Hindu belief, Churels may turn into dakinis and serve the goddess Kali, joining the goddess in her routine of feasting on human flesh and blood.

== Prevention and remedies ==
The best way to avoid a Churel is to prevent her creation. This means that people have to take good care of pregnant women. However, if a woman dies, the creation of a Churel can be still prevented and precautionary measures exist and are taken if a woman becomes one. In Tamil culture human priests gather and collectively propitiate her with offerings. In some villages, a Stonehenge-like structure is used to ward off the Churel.

In some places in India, the corpse may be carried out of the house from the side door, rather than the front door so that the deceased does not find her way back in the house. If a woman dies during childbirth or during her menstrual cycle, her "corpse is anointed with five different products of the cow and special texts are recited." In the Hilly regions, the place where a pregnant woman died is carefully scraped and the earth removed. The spot is then sown with mustard (sarson), which is also sprinkled along the road traversed by the corpse on its way to the burial ground. The reason behind this is that the mustard blossoms in the world of the dead, and the sweet smell pleases the spirit and keeps her content, so that she does not long to revisit her earthly home; secondly, the Churel rises from her grave at nightfall and seeks to return to her friends but when she sees the minute grains of the mustard scattered abroad and stoops to pick it up, and while she is engaged, the sun rises and she is unable to visit her home. This story also tells us that the Churel usually only comes out during the night.

Some sources say she can only be stopped by a Baiga (someone who gets rid of evil spirits) after a goat has been sacrificed. In one story, a boy described his visits from the Churel. Medicine men (men who were in charge of concocting herbal medicines and reciting incantations to get rid of evil) were called in and they helped get rid of the Churel which led to the survival of the boy.

=== Burial techniques for prevention ===
The forming of a Churel is prevented by burying the corpse of any woman who is likely to become one, instead of the usual Hindu cremation. Rites and rituals of her burial should be performed with utmost care. The woman should be remembered in songs and prayers.

Many methods, which differ according to different regions, exist to stop a woman from turning into a Churel. One way is to bury the body and fill the grave with thorns and pile heavy stones on top to stop the evil spirit from getting out. If a woman dies during pregnancy, her body is cut open to take the child out and both mother and child are buried in the same grave. The Majhwar of Mizapur bury their corpses with thorns and pile heavy stones on top to stop Churels from getting out. In the hilly regions of India, the dead woman is anointed with five products of a cow and texts are recited. Her coffin is then burned and then either buried or thrown in the river. Other techniques include nailing the four fingers and toes and roping together all the thumbs and big toes with iron rings and planting mustard in the soil in which she died.

According to the Oraon, the most evil Churels have their eyes sewn up with thorns and their hands and legs are broken. They are then laid down in the grave with their faces downwards while a spirit doctor follows the body all the way to the graveyard scattering mustard seeds all over the place and reciting prayers. The Gonds of Southern Mandla protect themselves from Churels "by tying down the corpse of a woman who dies in childbed with the child surviving". The Bhumias, who are highly suspicious of witchcraft, rest the women with their faces down to stop them from returning as Churels, while men are laid to rest on their backs.

== Stories ==
Among the authors who have written stories about the Churel are Rudyard Kipling, Humayun Ahmed, Rabindranath Tagore, Satyajit Ray, and Sukumar Ray. The Churel also figures into children's literature (such as Thakurmar Jhuli [Bengali children literature]) and television series. In the Indian Bengali horror film Putuler Protishod (1998), a girl who is murdered by her in-laws returns as a Churel to exact revenge.

Netflix original film Bulbbul (2020) is a retelling of this legend which gives a fictional origin of Churel. But without depicting her as an antagonist, this film takes a more feminist approach by narrating the story in a different perspective.

Bhoot FM, a live radio program aired by Bangladeshi radio channel Radio Foorti 88.0 FM was famous for sharing allegedly true paranormal stories. In that show, people from all over the country often called in to share their own stories of supernatural creatures and there have been several accounts of Churels.

== See also ==
- Chudail No. 1
- Bhoot (ghost)
- Banjhakri and Banjhakrini
- Banshee
- Daayan
- Madam Koi Koi
- Siren (mythology)
- Pichal Peri
- Folklore – Expressive culture shared by particular groups
- List of ghosts
- List of superstitions in India
- Superstition in India
- Ghosts in Bengali culture
- Pontianak (folklore)
- Witch
