= Patari =

Community in Uttar Pradesh

The Patari are a community found mainly in the Sonbhadra district of Uttar Pradesh, India.

== History and origin ==
There are various theories as to the origin of the Patari tribe. According to the tribe itself, the Patari are by origin Gond tribals, who were ritual specialists and advisers to the Gond kings. They belong to the Devgond sub-division. Other sources, such as William Crooke claim that the Patari are actually of Majhwar origin, and descend from seven brothers, of which their ancestor Patari was responsible for the rituals and traditions of the other six Majhwar clans. The Patari once spoke Chhattisgarhi, but now speak Hindi. They are found throughout south eastern Uttar Pradesh, but are concentrated in Sonbhadra district.

== Social organisation ==
The Patari are further divided into four sub-divisions, each of which have separate totemistic septs called kuris. Major septs among the first sub-group include the Narkam, Poija, Kusro, Soi, Neti, and Serlo. In the second sub-group, major kuris include the Tekam, Netam. Pusan and Marpachi.While in the third sub-groups, major kuri include the Marai and Sarota, and fourth sub-group, the kuris include the Kuram, Poika, and Armon. The Patari are endogamous, but practice kuri exogamy.

The Patari are priests, locally known as Baigas, of a number of tribal grouping in south-east Uttar Pradesh such as the Majhwar, Chero and Bhuiyar. Their community deities include Buradeo, and they incorporate a number of folk beliefs. The Patari have a traditional caste council, referred to as the biradari panchayat, to which are inter-community disputes are referred too. This is headed by a Chaudhary, a position which hereditary. Most Chaudhary families are perceived as natural leaders of the community. The panchayat has the power to excommunicate a person, but more often fines are given. A large number of issues such as elopement or adultery are dealt with by the panchayat.

Many Patari are now farmers and sharecroppers, having abandoned their traditional occupation of the priesthood. An important subsidiary occupation is animal husbandry.

The Government of Uttar Pradesh had classified the Patari as a Scheduled Caste but by 2007, they were one of several groups that it redesignated as Scheduled Tribes. As of 2017, this tribal designation applies only for Sonbhadra district, as it also did at the time of the 2011 Census of India when the Patari Scheduled Caste population in Uttar Pradesh was 366.

== See also ==
- List of Scheduled Tribes in Uttar Pradesh
