= Chud Vijogan =

Indian folklore

Chud Vijogan is a folklore from Saurashtra region of Gujarat, India. According to the folklore, a female spirit as Chudail composed verses from his lover.

== Folklore ==
In Okha-Barda region or some town in Saurashtra, a Sindhi girl was in love with Amiyal, a son of a townchief or a minister. But when she was married to a different prince, she lived out of town alone under pretext of a vow and continued her love affair with Amiyal. When the prince came to know about it, he killed the girl. She was reborn as a Chudail and continued her affair with Amiyal who was unaware of it. When he come to know the truth, he left her and went to Girnar hill. The Chudail found him and hated him for leaving her.

== Verses ==
According to one opinion, Amiyal is a name of Sindhi girl while according to other, her name is Chud. According to an opinion, Chud is derived from Chudail, a female spirit. About hundred verses, with or without name, are found regarding this folklore. These verses include Sindhi words too. Most verses have six stanza but some have less. Based on subject and style, Sindhi Muslim verse writer Tamachi Sumra is suggested as a possible writer.

These verses are primarily directed to lover or about love. The subjects include arrival, departure, dream and bereavement. It also advises on love to whom and not. It also describes materials from folk life.

Jhaverchand Meghani notes these verses in "Sajna" chapter in his Gujarati book Parkamma. This folklore is also an origin of his Gujarati story "Olipo".
