= Dalera =

Hindu caste

The Dalera, sometimes pronounced as Dalere, is a Hindu caste found in North India. They claim lineage from union between a Gurjar male and Kahar female.

== Occupation ==
The primary occupation of the caste was according to the 1901 Census of India was Basketmaking and day-labouring

== Geographical Location ==
They are found almost entirely in Bareilly District

== Social Status ==
There social positioning in the Hindu caste system is generally considered low

== Government Status ==
The Dalera were classified as a Criminal Tribe under the Criminal Tribes Act in a case titled "Queen-Empress vs Hori on 27 May, 1899" it was declared that the accused named Hori could not be sent to a reformatory school as he was from a tribe declared ineligible to be done so under "Rule 4 of the rules made by the Local Government and published at pages 167, 168 of the North-Western Provinces and Oudh Government Gazette, Part VI, 3rd July 1897" The Dalera themselves are neither Scheduled Tribes, Scheduled Caste or Other Backward Caste

== See also ==
- Basor
