= Sahariya (caste) =

North Indian caste community

Saharia
Regions with significant populations
- India

Languages
- • Hindi

Religion
- • Hinduism 100%

Related ethnic groups
- • Panika • Parahiya • Bind

The Sahariya are a community found in the Bundelkhand region of North India, which is administered by the states of Madhya Pradesh and Uttar Pradesh. They are also known as Rawat, Banrawat, Banrakha and Soarain.

== History and origin ==
The term saharia is derived from the Hindi word sahra, meaning jungle, thus Sahariya means jungle dwellers. They trace their origin from Shabri of the Ramayana. Others claim descent from Baiju Bheel, a worshiper of the Hindu god Shiva. The community is divided into several exogamous gotras, the main ones being Sanauna, Rajauria, Chandele, Rohtele, Solanki, Khareyia, Bagolia, Jecheria, Kusmorna, Chakardiya, Kurwana and Theogana.

== Present circumstances ==
The Sahariya are found in the Bundelkhand region, which covers parts of Uttar Pradesh and Madhya Pradesh states. This region is covered with thick and thin forest, with low rainfall, and is home to number of other tribal communities such as the Chero and Kol. Forests are a major economic resource for the Sahariya community. Their traditional occupations are cutting wood, collecting honey, making baskets, mining and quarrying, and breaking stones. Basketry is also an important craft the community.

The community has a caste council, headed by a patel, and the council imposes fines and social boycotts on the offenders found guilty of committing rape, elopement and adultery.

The Sahariya are Hindu and worship a number of local deities such as Bhavani, Gond Devta, Bundela Devta, Soorin and Bijasur.

The Government of Uttar Pradesh had classified them as a Scheduled Caste but by 2007, they were one of several groups that it had redesignated as Scheduled Tribes. As of 2017, this designation applied only in Lalitpur district, as it also did at the time of the 2011 Census of India when the Sahariya Scheduled Caste population in Uttar Pradesh was 23,644. The figure for the Rawat population at that time was 213,326.

== See also ==
- List of Scheduled Tribes in Uttar Pradesh

Saharia

- Naik, Thakorlal Bharabhai (1922). The Saharias. SyneSine Press. LCCN 88-901295.

Ethnological study of the Saharia tribe of Morena District, Madhya Pradesh

Joshi, Vibha 1987 'A Primitive Tribe of Madhya Pradesh: Social Organization and Religion of the Sahariya'. M.Phil Dissertation. Department of Anthropology, Delhi University.

V.J.Patel(Vibha Joshi) 1993. 35 minute ethnographic film 'The Sahariya of Madhya Pradesh' filmed in 1992-3 in Sheopur kala division (now a district), in Palpur village in Palpur-Kuno forest, and in Agra, Ameth Parond and other villages of Morena, M.P. (includes an interview of surrendered dacoit, Ramesh Singh Sikarwar) . Anthropological Survey of India.Kolkatta Also see:

Srivastava, Vinay Kumar 2016 'Speaking of Caste: Merit of the Principle of Segmentation', Sociological Bulletin.
