= Domar (caste) =

Hindu caste of India

The Domar are a Hindu caste found in the states of Karnataka, Uttar Pradesh and Madhya Pradesh in India.

== Origin ==
According to the traditions of the Domar, their origin lies with Harishchandra, who on an occasion is said to have disguised himself as a Dom at a funeral pyre in Varanasi. They are found mainly in eastern Uttar Pradesh, principally in the districts of Kanpur, Raebareli, and Allahabad. They speak the Awadhi dialect.

== Present circumstances ==
The Domar community are said to have originally consisted of several divisions, the Domar proper, the Turahiya, the Hadi, the Bansphor, the Dusadh and the Dhanuk. All these are now distinct communities, and strictly endogamous. The Domar, like other Hindu communities practice clan exogamy. They are Hindu but are rarely visited by Brahmin priests, and have their own religious specialist.

The Domar are a landless community, providing the bulk of the agricultural labourers in eastern Uttar Pradesh. Many urban Domars are employed as cleaners in hospitals. The Domar remain one of the most marginalized communities in the Awadh region. They live in multi-caste villages, but occupy their own distinct quarters. As a Dalit community, they often suffer from societal discrimination. Each of their settlement contains an informal caste council, known as a biradari panchayat. The panchayat acts as instrument of social control, dealing with issues such as divorce and adultery.

The 2011 Census of India for Uttar Pradesh showed the Domar classified as a Scheduled Caste with a population of 24,581.
