= Bhuiyar =

Hindu weavers caste

Bhuiyar or Bhuyiar
Regions with significant populations
- Uttar Pradesh

Languages
- Hindi

Religion
- Hinduism

The Bhuiyar or Bhuyiar are a Hindu caste found in the Indian state of Uttar Pradesh. They have scheduled caste status and are also known as Bhanyar. The traditional occupation of the Bhuiyar caste is weaving but that has declined due to mechanisation.

== Origin ==
They are a group of Munda tribesmen who settled in the southern and the western Uttar Pradesh in the 16th century. They were a community that historically were involved with weaving and some were involved slash and burn agriculture, and occupied the hilly terrain of south Mirzapur district. The Bhuiyar are further divided into sub-divisions, which are referred to as kori. Their main koris are the Baria, Birkunia, Chandnihys, Chetrihya, Chiriha, Dioriya, Khutta, Parha, Patparaha and Sudha. They are strictly endogamous, and practice clan exogamy. The Bhuiyar are found in the districts of Sonbhadra and Mirzapur. They speak Hindi, having long forgotten their Munda language.

== Present circumstances ==
The Bhuiyar are now a community of settled agriculturists. Their earlier slash and burn practices have disappeared. Most Bhuiyar are a small and medium-sized farmers, with a minority being employed as agricultural labourers. Many are now also employed in the mines that have appeared in Mirzapur district. They live in multi-caste villages, occupying their own distinct quarters. They have much in common with neighbouring tribal communities such as the Kol, Agariya and Chero. Each of their settlement contains an informal caste council, known as a biradari panchayat. The panchayat acts as instrument of social control, dealing with issues such as divorce and adultery.

The 2011 Census of India for Uttar Pradesh showed the Bhuiyar population as 28,360.
