= Pichal peri =

Supernatural creature in Asian ghost stories

Pichal peri or pichhal pairī (Punjabi: ਪਿੱਛਲ ਪੈਰੀ, پچھل‌ پيری, lit. 'reverse-footed') is the name given to the churel in northwestern South Asia and Central Asia because of their typical appearance as a woman with long hair covering the face and feet pointing backward. Some versions claim they have inverted faces as well and only attack men. They are also known as Daan.

== Background ==
Pichal peris are said to roam the mountains of India and Pakistan. They are said to be found in the Himalayas, though they occasionally enter some Indian villages. In Pakistan, sightings are usually reported in the rural mountainous regions of the Khyber Pakhtunkhwa province, however sightings in the Punjab province are also occasionally reported. People who claim these reports are usually elders of rural villages who are known to hold superstitious beliefs, it is possible that people in Punjab have taken inspiration from their northern neighbours and made their own versions of the legend. The characteristics of the pichal peri vary depending on region.

In some versions, pichal peris appear in the woods at night and target lone men. Most stories will have the victim escaping as these are usually told by people who claim to be first hand witnesses. It is believed that pichal peris have two forms. In most stories they appear as beautiful women in order to lure men and get exposed only due to their backward feet. In some cases witnesses claim to see the female form transforming into a tall demonic creature.

== See also ==
- Abarimon or antipode, people from classical mythology with their feet turned backwards and native to the Himalayas
- Ciguapa, Dominican mythological creatures in the form of dark-skinned women with very long hair and backward-facing feet
- Curupira
- Indian folklore
- Pakistani folklore
- Roohi, a 2021 Indian film featuring a pichal peri (though referred to as muṛiyā pairī in the film)
