= Bhantu =

North Indian Hindu caste

The Bhantu (Sansi tribe) are a Hindu caste majorly found in Central and North western states of India, where they have scheduled caste status. They are one of the many nomadic groups found in North India.

== History ==
The Bhantu claim to be Rajput soldiers in the army of Maharana Pratap, who after his defeat at the hands of the Mughal Emperor Akbar dispersed into forests. There the community took up dacoity and theft. During the period of British, they were notified under the Criminal Tribes Act. Many were exiled to the Andaman Islands. In 1952, they were allowed to return to Uttar Pradesh, and many were settled in Shekhupur village in Badaun District. They are now found mainly in the districts of Moradabad, Kanpur, and Kheri.

== Present circumstances ==
The community consists of eight exogamous clans, the Gaado, Dholia, Cherele, Banswale, Dhapan, Sadheke, Mina and Marwari. Marriages are strictly prohibited within the clans.

The 2011 Census of India for Uttar Pradesh, where they were classified as a Scheduled Caste, showed the Bhantu population as 11,807.

== Notables ==
- Sunny Hindustani winner of (Indian Idol 11)
