= Shilpkar =

Dalit caste in Uttarakhand

Regions with significant populations
- • Uttarakhand • Uttar Pradesh
- Uttarakhand: 9,29,267
- Uttar Pradesh: 26,706

Languages
- • Kumaoni • Garhwali • Hindi

Religion
- Hinduism and Buddhism

Shilpkar are an artisan community mainly associated with Intaglio techniques, coppersmithing and painting. They are the largest Scheduled Caste communities of Uttarakhand, primarily present in the Kumaon and Garhwal region.

== History ==
Shilpkars are not a single caste but a collection of many artisan communities associated with metalworking, coppersmithing and paper works, deriving the name from the Hindi word, ''Shilpkari'' which refers to handcraft or artisan work. The community was originated from Uttarakhand and make things from rope. They are mainly engaged as Intaglio on stone and gems, Painting, crafting, bronzesmiths, with others engaged in and cultivating, or working as, blacksmiths, weavers. Bhankora is a native musical instrument and is handmade from copper by them. They used to perform with it at folk festivals or marriages.

In the early 20th century, many lower caste communities of the Kumaon region such as Auji, Bajgi, Badhi, Doom, Tamta (Lohar) and Kolis organised them to be called as Shilpkar as they called as "Doom", which was considered offensive by them. In 1913, Shilpkar Sudharini Sabha, held a convention for the uplifting of Dalits and oppressed people of the area, known as the Shilpkar Mahasabha in Uttarakhand. The British government officially recognized as "Shilpkars" as a community in 1925.

Arya Samaj influenced a lot of them, especially in the Garhwal region, and many of them dropped their caste surnames and adopted 'Arya' as a last name. Jayananda Bharati and Baldev Singh Arya were those who promoted "Arya Samaj" in Dalits of Uttarakhand. They started 'Dola Palki Movement' and in 1928 he also organised "Garhwal Sarvadalit Parishad". In the Kumaon region, Hari Prasad Tamta (1887-1962) was considered as a hero among the community and the 'Father of Shilpkar Revolution' due to his enormous contribution towards the mobilazation of the Dalit communities in the region and he also stood with B. R. Ambedkar during the Round Table Conference in 1932.

== Distribution ==
They form 52% of the total population of the Scheduled caste population in Uttarakhand and are a beneficiary of the reservation policy.

About 68.5 percent of the members are cultivators by profession. They are mainly found in the hill region of Uttarakhand and Terai regions of Uttar Pradesh. In Nepal, they are known as Tamrakar.

== Notable members ==
- Yashpal Arya, former speaker of Uttarakhand Legislative Assembly.

== See also ==
- Chamar
