= Kalabaz =

Indian Hindu caste

The Kalabaz are a Hindu caste found in the state of Uttar Pradesh in India. They have Scheduled Caste status.

== Origin ==
The word kalabaz in Hindi means an acrobat, and the Kalabaz or nagar caste are an endogamous sub-group within the larger Nat caste of North India. Like other Nats, they claim to have originally been Rajputs, who lost caste after their defeat at the hands of the Mughal Empire. Those Nats who became acrobats over time evolved into a distinct community. Historically, the Kalabaz were a nomadic community, but have now been settled by the Indian government. They speak Hindi but have their own particular dialect.

== Present circumstances ==
The Kalabaz are strictly endogamous and practice clan exogamy. They are further divided into a number of exogamous sub-divisions, known as gotras, namely the Bakiya, Dariyabadi, Dibichia, Ghughasia, Goojre, Gulal, Jharbheria, Kala, Kingiriya, Kulba, Marora, Panchiya, Paharia and Sati. The main function of the gotra is to trace descent and to regulate their marriage alliances.

The Kalabaz are a landless community, and are still involved in their traditional occupation of acrobatic performances. Many have seen a decline in their traditional occupation, and are employed as day labourers. Like other Hindu castes, each Kalabaz settlement contains a biradari panchayat, an informal caste association, which acts as an instrument of social control.

The 2011 Census of India for Uttar Pradesh showed the Kalabaz, who were classified as a Scheduled Caste having a population of 11,199.
