= Habura (caste) =

Caste in northern India

The Habura are a Hindu caste found in the state of Uttar Pradesh, India.

== Origin ==
According to some traditions, the word habura has its roots in the "hawwa", which means an evil spirit. Their own traditions make reference to the fact that community are descended from Rajput soldiers. They were attempts to forcibly convert them to Islam, and as a result took refuge into the forests. The Habura then took up a nomadic existence, often also engaging in vagrancy. As a result, the British colonial authorities placed them in the category of a criminal tribe. After independence of India in 1947, they were denotified in 1952, when the Criminal Tribes Act was replaced with the Habitual Offenders Act, but the community continues to carry considerable social stigma.

== Present circumstances ==
The Habura are found mainly in the central Doab region of Uttar Pradesh. Most are found in the districts of Moradabad, Bareilly, Pilibhit, Shahjahanpur, Aligarh, Etah, Jhansi and Mathura. Although most Habura now speak Hindi, they have a particular dialect of their own known as Habura Bhasha. They are strictly endogamous, and practice clan exogamy. Their main clans are the Dabhi, Makol, Parmar and Solanki.

Historically, the Habura were a nomadic community. Most now live in multi-caste villages, often working for Jat or Brahmin patrons. After their denotification as a criminal tribe, they were settled by the government in colonies, and given agricultural land. But these land holdings are extremely marginal, forcing many Haburas to become bonded labourers. This is known locally as batai, where the sharecropper is forced hand over 50 percent of their produce. They are an extremely marginalised community, suffering from severe poverty.

The 2011 Census of India for Uttar Pradesh showed the Habura population as 6015.
