= Kharot =

The Kharot are a Scheduled Caste found in the state of Uttar Pradesh in India. They are an endogamous sub-group within the Beldar caste, and are found mainly in eastern Uttar Pradesh. The name Kharot is said to be derived from the Sanskrit word khata, which means grass. They were historically associated with the manufacture of mats from grass, and the word kharot literally means a grass mat manufacturer.

Like other Scheduled Caste communities, they have seen a disappearance of their traditional occupation and most Kharot are now landless agricultural labourers.

According to 2001 Census of India, their population was 700, found mainly in Basti District. The 2011 Census of India for Uttar Pradesh showed the Kharot Scheduled Caste population as 1219.
