= Dholia =

Dholia also spelled Dholiya refers to an Indian gotra who do not cremate their dead.
