= Gharami =

The Gharami are a Hindu caste found in Uttar Pradesh, India. Their traditional occupation was thatching and lattice work. Their customs are similar to other North Indian Hindus. In Uttar Pradesh, they have been granted Scheduled Caste status and at the 2011 Census of India numbered 37 people in 12 households. In Bangladesh they are known for making traditional houses such as mud house.
