= Ghasiya =

Hindu caste in India

The Ghasiya, sometimes pronounced Ghasia, are a Hindu caste found in the state of Uttar Pradesh in India. They are also known as Ghasiara and have Scheduled Caste status in that state.

== Origin ==
According to some traditions, the word ghasiya is said to mean grasscutter, from the Hindi word ghahus meaning grass. They are one of a number of tribal communities found in the hilly region of southern Uttar Pradesh, in particularly Mirzapur and Sonbadhra. The Ghasiya claim to have immigrated from Surguja district in what is now in Chhattisgarh. Their traditions refer to a time when they were rulers, but over time lost their position, and took to cultivation.

The Ghasiya are strictly endogamous community, and practice the principle of clan exogamy. These clans are referred to as kuris, and their main clans include the Arilkhanda, Banger, Bhainsa, Janta, Katihari, Sonwan and Surajbansi. The Sonwan claim a higher status, and derive their name from the Hindi word sona, meaning gold. Other clans are also have their own origin myth. For example, Bhainsa are said to have acquired their name from godling Bhainsasur. They are Hindu, but have their own tribal deities such as Burhimai, Dulhadeo, and Sheetla Devi. The Ghasiya speak the Bundelkhandi dialect of Hindi.

The Ghasiya are a small landowning community. Many Ghasiya are still employed as grass-cutters. Many are also involved in the manufacture of a comb known as a mandau. They live in their own settlements, interacting little with neighbouring communities.

The 2011 Census of India for Uttar Pradesh showed the Ghasiya population, which was classified as a Scheduled Caste, as being 5888.
