= Kapariya =

The Kapariya are a Hindu caste found in the state of Uttar Pradesh in India. They are also known as Khunkhuniya Bhatt and are listed as a Scheduled Tribe.

== Origin ==
The word kapariya is derived from the Hindi word kapra, which means a cloth. They claim to be a branch of the Bhatt community, that took to begging. A change of occupation led to an evolution of a distinct community. They have two sub-divisions, the Brahma Bhatta and Rao Bhatta. The Kapariya are found mainly in Fatehpur district, where they are considered the original settlers. They speak Awadhi among themselves, and Hindi with outsiders.

== Present circumstances ==
The Kapariya are strictly endogamous and their two sub-divisions, the Brahma Bhatta and Rao Bhatta, are also endogamous. They are further divided into a number of exogamous sub-divisions, known as gotras. The main function of the gotra is to trace descent and to regulate their marriage alliances. The Brahma Bhatta claim a higher status from the Rao Bhatta, a system of hypergamy exists among these two groups.

The Kapariya are a are still involved in their traditional occupation is clothes selling. Many have seen a decline in their traditional occupation, and are employed as day labourers. A small number have been granted land, but their land holdings are extremely small. Like other Hindu castes, each Kapariya settlement contains a biradari panchayat, an informal caste association, which acts as an instrument of social control.

The 2011 Census of India for Uttar Pradesh showed the Kapariya Scheduled Caste population as 20,205.
