= Agariya people =

Community of the states of Madhya Pradesh and Uttar Pradesh in India

The Agariya are community of the states of Madhya Pradesh and Uttar Pradesh in India. Those in the vicinity of Mirzapur were involved in mining and smelting iron during the British Raj.

The Agariya speak the Agariya language as well as Hindi and Chhattisgarhi.

There is a group known as the Agariya in Gujarat that are salt makers in the desert. A ritual associated with this community is that the feet of Agariya people are burnt separately. Since they are standing continuously in salt fields, their feet get wounded and salt get absorbed in the feet. So it will not burn easily in the funeral. It is not clear if these Agariya have any relation to the others.

In the early 20th century, the Agariya in Mirzapur were divided into totemic groups. They had been heavily influenced by Hinduism. They called themselves Hindu but did not worship any of the major Hindu deities which other Hindus did.

The Government of Uttar Pradesh had classified the Agariya as a Scheduled Caste but by 2007, they were one of several groups that it redesignated as Scheduled Tribes. As of 2017, this tribal designation applies only for Sonbhadra district. They are a Scheduled Tribe in Madhya Pradesh.

The 2011 Census of India for Uttar Pradesh showed the Agariya Scheduled Caste population as 5803.

== See also ==
- List of Scheduled Tribes in Uttar Pradesh
