= Hela (caste) =

The Hela are a Hindu caste found in the state of Uttar Pradesh in India. They are a sub-group within the larger Balmiki community of North India.

The Hela are a community of agricultural labourers and sanitation workers mainly found in the districts of Varanasi, Ghazipur, Maharajganj, Kushinagar and Mirzapur. They are divided into five sub-groups: Supa Bhagat, Chaudhary, Nourchinwa, Lalbegi and Shaikh-Hela. Traditionally, the community was hierarchical, with the Bhagat considering themselves superior to the other sub-groups.

The 2011 Census of India for Uttar Pradesh showed the Hela population as 52,314.
