= Khairaha =

The Khairaha are a Hindu caste found in the state of Uttar Pradesh in India. They have Scheduled Caste status.

== Origin ==
The Khairaha are a sub-group of the Khairwar tribe of central India. Small groups of Khairwar tribesmen are said to have migrated to the Mirzapur district in the 18th century. They are now entirely separate from their parent community, now speaking Hindi. The Khairaha are now found mainly in Mirzapur and Allahabad districts.

== Present circumstances ==
Their habitat is hilly undulating terrain, and extremely forested. They speak Hindi and have Scheduled Caste status. The Khairaha are divided into a number of exogamous clans known as kuris, of which the following are the main ones, Chouria, Nagria and Tengriha. They use the surname Kashyap. Like other Hindu castes, they are strictly endogamous.

The Khairaha are now a community of small and medium sized farmers. Animal husbandry and fishing are subsidiary occupations. Many are also employed in the mines that are found throughout southern Uttar Pradesh. They have a number of tribal deities like Goerdevi and Dulhadeo.

The 2011 Census of India for Uttar Pradesh showed the Khairaha Scheduled Caste population as 892.
