= Baiswar =

Hindu caste

The Baiswar is a Hindu caste found in the state of Uttar Pradesh, Madhya Pradesh, Chhattisgarh, and other parts of India. They are considered as a sub clan of Bais Rajput. They rank as respectable high caste Hindus. They are either landholders or tenants with occupancy rights. They dress and wear ornaments like ordinary Rajputs, and among the low tribe around them their claim to that rank is generally accepted. Their worship is conducted at a temple of Bhawani (Bhawani Mandir), in Bardi near Khatai, Madhya Pradesh.
