= Badi (caste) =

The Badi or Badhi are a Hindu caste found in the state of Uttar Pradesh, India. They have Scheduled Caste status.

== Origin ==
The Badi are a sub-group within the larger Nat caste. They are found mainly in Saharanpur District. The Badi are further divided into a number of clans, the main ones being the Swaroop and Aurender. They are strictly endogamous and practice clan exogamy.

== Present circumstances ==
The Badi are one of a number of nomadic communities that were involved in entertaining at fairs. A fair number are now employed as agricultural labourers, with a smaller number having acquired small plots of land.

The 2011 Census of India for Uttar Pradesh showed the Badi population as 11,028.
