= Parahiya =

Hindu caste in Uttar Pradesh

The Parahiya are a Hindu caste found in the state of Uttar Pradesh in North India.

== Origin ==
The name Parahiya is said to mean in the Gondi language the burners of the forest because they practice slash and burn agriculture. According to other traditions, the name is corruption of the word Paharia, which in Hindi means a hill dweller. They are one of a number of tribal communities such as the Panika that occupy the foothills of the Vindhya mountains. The community speak a dialect of Hindi.

== Present circumstances ==
The habitat of most of the Parhiya is the hilly, undulating and extremely forested southern part of Sonbhadra district, at the foot of the Vindhya mountains. They are endogamous and divided into a number of exogamous clans known as kuris, of which the main ones are the Bengeha, Bhaloa, Bhania, Bhusan, Gohawa, Gurgur, Monnoor and Sira. Although they are Hindu, they also have a number of their own tribal deities such as Jawalamukhi Devi and Dharti Mata.

The Parahiya depend on the forest for their subsistence. They are small landholding community. Hunting and gathering forest produce is an important source of their income. They collect roots, tubers, fruits, lacs and leaves, which they sell at the local market. They no longer engage in hunting as settled cultivation is now their occupation.

The Government of Uttar Pradesh had classified them as a Scheduled Caste but by 2007, they were one of several groups that it had redesignated as Scheduled Tribes. As of 2017, this designation applies only in Sonbhadra district, as it also did at the time of the 2011 Census of India when the Parahiya Scheduled Caste population in Uttar Pradesh was 2446.
