= Bedia (caste) =

Indian Hindu caste

The Bedia is a caste in India. They believe that they originally lived at Mohdipahar in Hazaribagh district and have descended from the union of a Vedbansi prince with a Munda girl. A legend has heard that they had their own 'Vedas' and hence it is called Bediya. Their Veda was different from the Vedas of Aryans.

== Present circumstances ==
Distribution of Bedia community in India

The Bedia who have settled down in West Bengal are also known as the Bede or Bedia. They speak in Nagpuri, an Indo-Aryan language, at home, and Bengali for inter-group communication. The Bengali and Devanagari scripts are used.

The 2011 Census of India for Uttar Pradesh, where they were classified as a Scheduled Caste under the name Beriya, showed their population as 46,775. In Jharkhand, they are listed as a Scheduled Tribe.

== Clans ==
They have numbers of exogamous clans such as Pecha (owl), Mahua (Madhuca India), Suia (parrot), Kachhua (tortoise), Chidra (squirrel) etc. Their deities are Bad Pahari and Palcharu. They celebrate festivals such as Jitiya, Sohrai, Fagun, and Sarhul.
