= Balhar =

The Balahar are a Hindu caste found in the state of Uttar Pradesh, India. They are also known as chatriya and have SC status.

== Origin ==
The word balahar means a crier or summoner in Hindi. They are said to have acquired this name from the fact that they were traditionally employed as part of an informal police force by princely states of India, and their duties included carry out the summons of the prince . Like other Hindu occupational castes, they might be of diverse origin, but are now bound by rules of endogamy. In Uttar Pradesh, the Balahar claim to have originate from Jaipur in Rajasthan, and claim to be Rajputs. They are chiefly in the Bundelkhand and Doab regions.

== Present circumstances ==
The Balahar are strictly endogamous community, and practice the principle of clan exogamy. These clans are referred to as khempas, and their main khempas include the Nadani, Mahor, Bagri, Sorauja, Itkan, Pharer, Jaroliya, Dheran, and Turkiya. The Balahar are a community of agriculturists, almost evenly divided between peasant proprietors and sharecroppers . Their traditional occupation of watchmen and bodyguards is now extinct. They are Hindu, but also practice ancestor worship.

As a Dalit community, they often suffer from societal discrimination. They live in multi-caste villages, but occupy distinct quarters. Each of their settlement contains an informal caste council, known as a biradari panchayat. The panchayat acts as instrument of social control, dealing with issues such as divorce and adultery.

The 2011 Census of India for Uttar Pradesh showed the Balahar population as 5029.
