= Dharkar =

Hindu caste

The Dharkar are a Hindu caste found in the state of Uttar Pradesh, India.

== Origin ==
The word dharkar comes from the Hindi words dhar, meaning rope, and kar, meaning manufacturer. This denotes their traditional occupation of rope-making. The Dharkar are found mainly in purvanchal district. A small number are also found in the districts of Gazipur, Azamgarh, Allahabad, Gonda and Gorakhpur. They speak the Awadhi dialect of Hindi.
