= Banmanus =

Indian community of forest dwellers

Banmanus are a forest dwellers community in Uttar Pradesh, concentrated in Awadh region. They have traditionally engaged in hunting and gathering, residing in the deep forested region of Southern Awadh. Though after loss of forests during colonial rule in the region, they were forced engaged themselves as agriculturalists and labourers.

They are recognized as Scheduled Caste in Uttar Pradesh and have a population of 24,185 in the state.

They have depicted as "Cave dwellers" with lifestyle similar to that of Raji people, who resides in the Nepal and Uttarakhand and also called as Ban-Manus (or Forest humans).
