= Badhik =

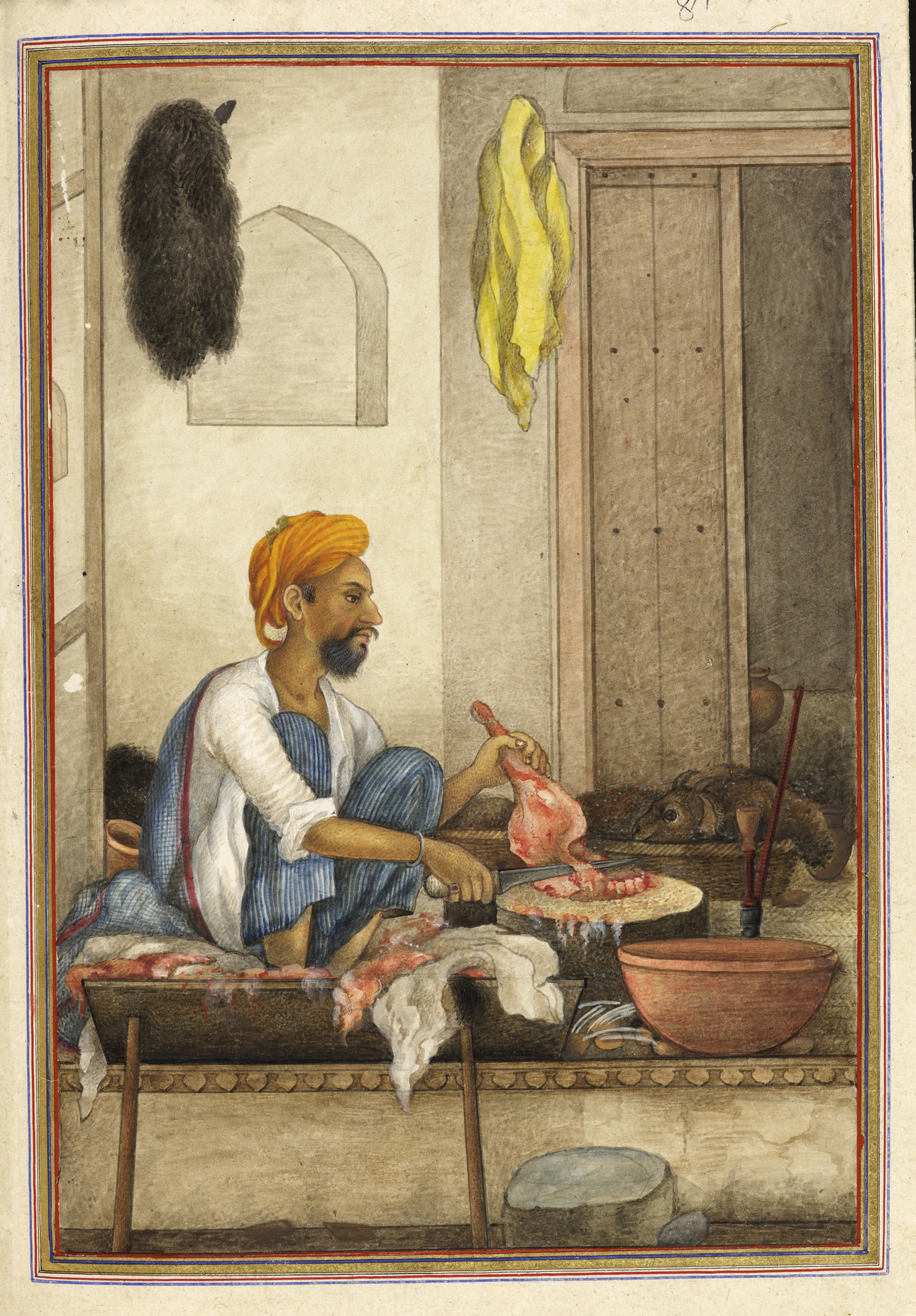
Badhak, the caste of butchers - Tashrih al-aqvam (1825)

The Badhik, or sometimes pronounced Badhak a Hindu caste engages in the profession of butcher are found in the states of Uttar Pradesh, Rajasthan and Haryana in India. They have been granted scheduled caste status in Uttar Pradesh.

== Origin ==
The community is found mainly in Shahjahanpur District, and speak the Khari boli dialect of Hindi. A small number are also found in Mathura and Pilibhit.

== Present circumstances ==
The Badhik are strictly endogamous community, and practice the principle of clan exogamy. They are Hindu and observe all the major Hindu festivals but do not have exclusive family or clan deities. The Badhik are a landless community, providing the bulk of the agricultural labourers in eastern Uttar Pradesh. Traditionally, the community were hunters and gatherers, but now they are mainly butchers. Their subsidiary income is animal husbandry, poultry and drying and tanning of skins. A small number are also employed as agricultural labourers. As a Dalit community, they often suffer from societal discrimination. Each of their settlement contains an informal caste council, known as a biradari panchayat. The panchayat acts as instrument of social control, dealing with issues such as divorce and adultery.

The 2011 Census of India for Uttar Pradesh showed the Badhik population as 9018.
