= Balai =

Indian caste

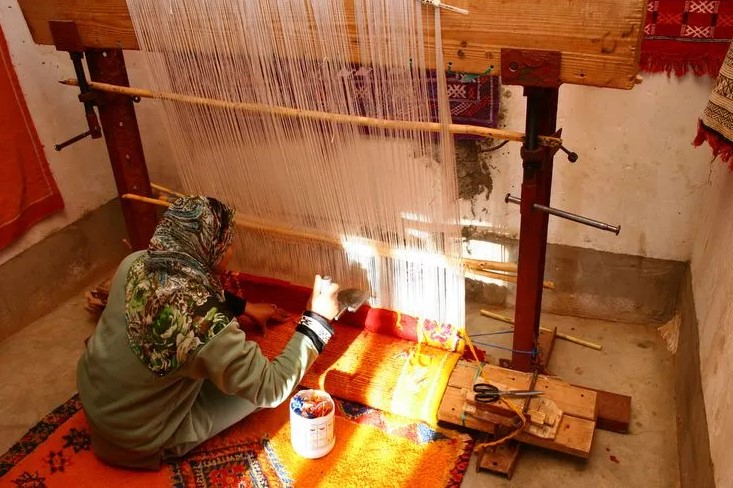
- Weaving, the traditional occupation of Balais
- Religions: Hinduism
- Languages: Nimadi, Dhundari, Marwadi, Punjabi, Kashmiri and Gujarati
- Country: India
- Original state: Rajasthan, Punjab, Maharashtra, Delhi, Madhya Pradesh and Uttar Pradesh
- Population: 2,668,000 (2011)
- Related groups: Salvi, Meghwal, Koli people

The Balai, Raj Balai, Balahi, or Bunkar are a people and an Indian caste. They live in the Indian states of Rajasthan, Punjab, Maharashtra, Delhi, Madhya Pradesh and Uttar Pradesh.

Balais are generally Hindus. The official categorization of the caste varies from state to state as a scheduled caste or other backward caste.

Balais speak languages including Nimadi, Dhundari, Marwadi, Punjabi, Kashmiri and Gujarati.

According to the 2011 census of India, there are 2,668,000 Balais in India.

== Balais as weavers ==
The Balai caste is a functional caste of weavers; historically, they were engaged in the work of weaving.

"Balai" is a transliteration of the Hindi word बुनाई, which means "weaving". They are also known as "Bunkar", meaning "weaver".

In the varna system, Balais belong to the vaishya.

== Raj Balais ==
Historically, the Raj Balais were royal messengers. They used to convey messages from one kingdom to another in ancient times. Raj means royal; therefore, Balais who engaged in such royal services were called Raj Balais.

== Beliefs ==
Balais are generally Hindus. They are devotees of Durga, Chamunda and Kalaratri; they consider Kalaratri as their kuladevi (tutelary deity). They also pay tribute to Ramdev Pir. Balais are divided into a number of gotras, including Chouhan, Rathore, Parihar, Parmar, Solanki, Brejwal, Bunker, Marichi, Atri, August, Bhardwaj, Matang, Dhaneshwar, Mahachand, Jogchand, Jogpal, Meghpal, Garva, and Jaipal. Balais do not marry within their families or their gotra. They live in multi-caste villages, and they bury their dead.

Balais are traditionally non-vegetarian as they believe in bali (animal sacrifice). As part of worshiping Kalaratri, Balai perform animal sacrifices.

=== Jainism ===
In 1964, Jain Shravak Sangha preached to the Balai, near Ratlam, in the village Guradia. Sangha gave Dharampal Jain Samaj to the Balai in the name of Dharmanatha.

Around 125,000 people of the Malviya and Gujarati Balai communities are Dharampal Jains.

== Associations with other peoples ==
Sometimes, the Balai are referred to as Julaha or Meghwal. Originally, most Balais associated themselves with the Meghwal community.

In the Indian states of Rajasthan and Gujarat, the Balai are associated with the Meghwal people due to their various cultural similarities; for example, both engage in the work of handicrafts and embroidery.
