= Turaiha =

Hindu fishing caste

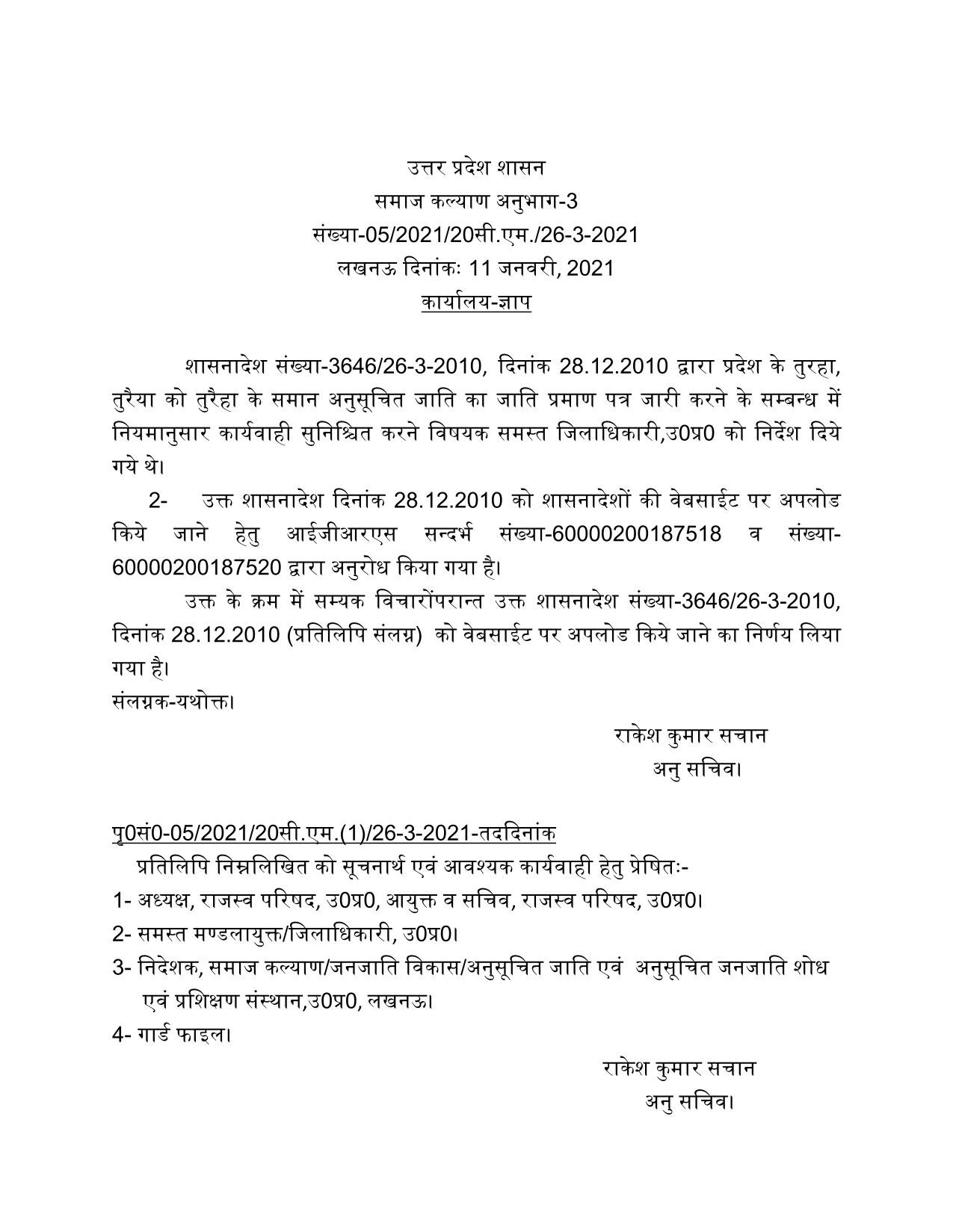
Uttar Pradesh government order 364626-3-2010, 28122010

Turaiha is a Hindu caste found in Indian state of Uttar Pradesh. They are also known as Turaha, Turha, Turahiya or Tureha found in the Indian states of Uttar Pradesh, Bihar, and Bengal, primarily living near rivers and lakes.

== Subgroups ==
The Turaiha community is listed as a Scheduled Caste (SC) in Uttar Pradesh under the Constitutional (Scheduled Castes) Order, 1950. which governs the SC list for Uttar Pradesh by the Ministry of Social Justice as per the latest Census data (2011).

Turaiha, Turha and Turaha as the Same Ethnic Group :The terms Turha, Turaha, and Turaiha refer to the same ethnic community, with variations arising from regional dialects, transliteration differences, and administrative classifications.

Ethnographic Corrections & Synonym Clarification: The Turaiha community is often referred to by multiple names (e.g., Turahiya, Turha, Turaha). The 2013 Bill have served to standardize these variations to prevent administrative confusion.

== Population ==
The 2011 Census data already recognized the Turaiha as a Scheduled Caste (SC) community, listed at position 66.

The Bihar government's "Caste-Based Survey 2022" indicates that the Turha/Turaiha caste has a population of around 467,867 and its position approximately 81st in the list of castes in the state. Meanwhile, the population of the Turaiha/Turha caste in Uttar Pradesh was recorded as 28,055, with nearly 10,000 (~34%). of this population residing in Ballia district alone.

== Scheduled caste ==
The Constitution (Scheduled Castes) Orders (Amendment) Bill, 2013 (Bill No. LV of 2013), and the Constitution (Scheduled Castes) Order (Amendment) Bill, 2014 (Bill No. XXIV of 2014), were introduced to update the SC list. The bill was passed in the Rajya Sabha on 11 July 2014, after being introduced in 2013. Following its passage, the Act came to be known as the Constitution (Scheduled Castes) Order (Amendment) Act, 2014. The 2013 Bill and its passage in 2014 likely ratified existing inclusions in Uttar Pradesh’s SC list, thereby ensuring their legal enforceability.

The 2013 Bill and 2014 Amendment did not newly introduce the Turaiha caste into Uttar Pradesh’s SC list but likely reinforced their existing status at position 66. Their inclusion dates back to the Constitution (Scheduled Castes) Order, 1950, and subsequent amendments (including the 2013 Bill) have served to clarify administrative details and synonyms for definitive proof of the Turaiha’s SC status.

In Uttar Pradesh, the TURHA /TURAHA surname caste community is not listed under any caste category in the Scheduled Caste (SC), Scheduled Tribe (ST), or Other Backward Class (OBC) lists while the Turaiha surname caste community is listed under the Scheduled Caste (SC) category community list in uttar pradesh . The surname 'Turaiha' is used in Uttar Pradesh due to regional dialects and they avail their community certificates. This issue arises because, in other parts of Indian states, such as Bihar, West Bengal, Jharkhand, and Madhya Pradesh, the surname 'Turha' is used and is recognized in the caste community category list respected states whereas in Uttar Pradesh, the surname 'Turaiha' is used and is already included in the Scheduled Caste list. Other indian respected states official document confirm that "TURAIHA" caste of uttar pradesh which is included in Scheduled Caste (SC) list are same as "TURHA" of their state. both are same.

== Present circumstances ==
The Turaiha are still employed to play the turaihi (turha) and other musical instruments on several occasions. However, the majority of the Turaiha are landless agricultural labourers. The Turaiha remain one of the most marginalised communities in the Uttar Pradesh. They live in multi-caste villages, but occupy their own distinct quarters. They often suffer from societal discrimination. Each of their settlement contains an informal caste council, known as a biradari panchayat. The panchayat acts as instrument of social control, dealing with issues such as divorce and adultery.
