= Basor =

Hindu caste

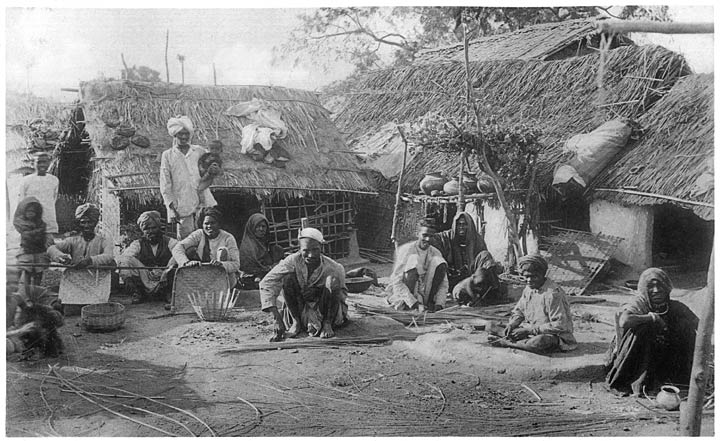
Basor weaving bamboo baskets in a 1916 book

The Basor or Bansor are Hindus found in the states of Uttar Pradesh and Madhya Pradesh in India. They have a scheduled caste status.

== Origin ==
The Basor were traditionally involved in the manufacture of bamboo items such as bamboo baskets, furniture, handicrafts, etc. The word Basor/Bansor means a bamboo artist and worker. The Basor are found mainly in the districts of Jalaun, Hamirpur, Mahoba, Jhansi, Kanpur and Banda. Some Basor belong To Jabalpur, Bhopal, Chhatarpur, Khajuraho and Sagar districts of Madhya Pradesh. They speak Bundelkhandi dialect, although most can also understand the western-side version of Hindi, known as khari Boli.

== Present circumstances ==
The Basor continue to practice strict community endogamy, as well as clan exogamy, which is a common practice among most North Indian Hindus. Their clans are called gotras, the main ones being the Karikan, Bahmangot, Dhuneb, Katahriya, Sikarwar, Samangot, Sonach and Supa. Marriages with the Muslim Bansphor community are avoided. The Basor live in multi-caste villages, but occupy their own distinct spaces in the village. Each of their settlements has an informal caste council, known as a jat panchayat. The panchayat is headed by a pradhan (prime leader), a position which is hereditary and generally given to an elder. In addition, there is an overarching panchayat for three to four villages. The panchayat resolves individual, familial, intra-caste, community disputes, as well as acts as an instrument of social control.

Like other artisan castes, they continue their traditional occupation. In recent years they have also taken up animal husbandry, and farming (mainly as marginal farmers, and sharecroppers). One can find them in the daily wage labourers' markets. They also sometimes act as village musicians especially during processions, marriages and other socio-religious ceremonies.

The 2011 Census of India for Uttar Pradesh showed the Basor population as 129,885.
