= Baheliya =

Hindu caste in Uttar Pradesh, India

The Baheliya are a Hindu caste found in the state of Uttar Pradesh, India.

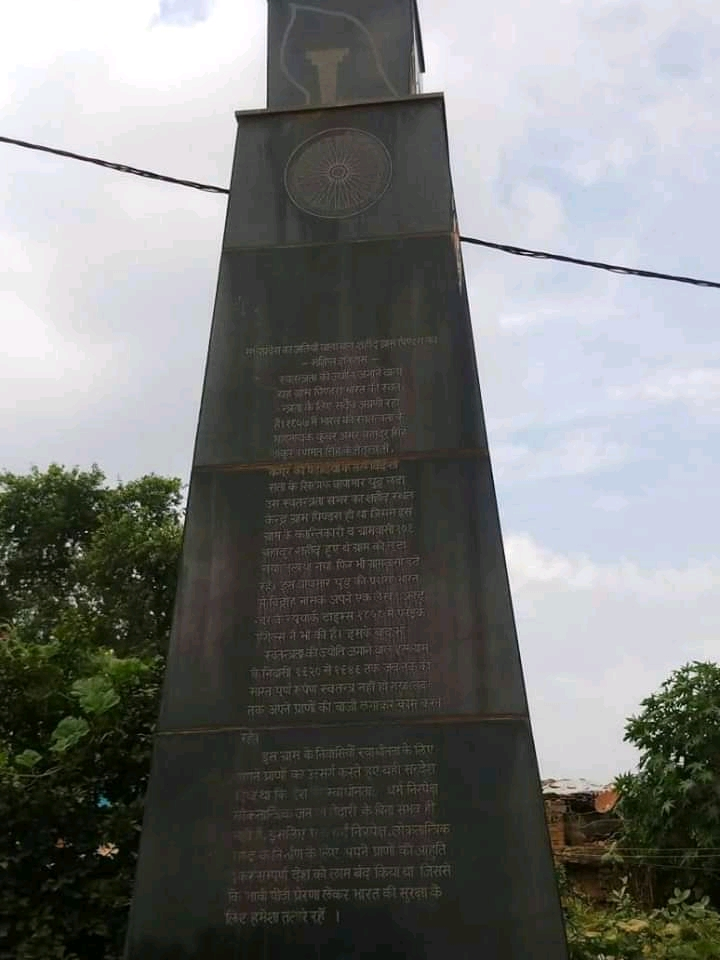
Baheliya

Baheliya community had a role in the 1857 independence struggle at Pindra Village, Satna, Madhya Pradesh wherein they fought bravely against the Britishers and were killed. The names of the martyrs are mentioned on the memorial present at the village.

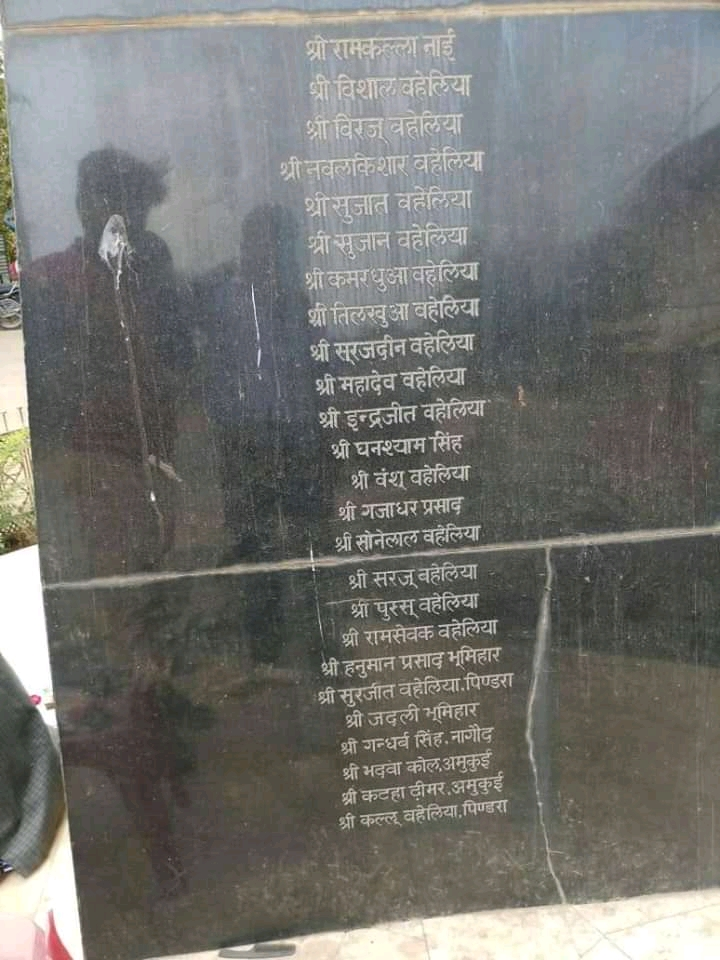
हिन्दी: बहेलिया

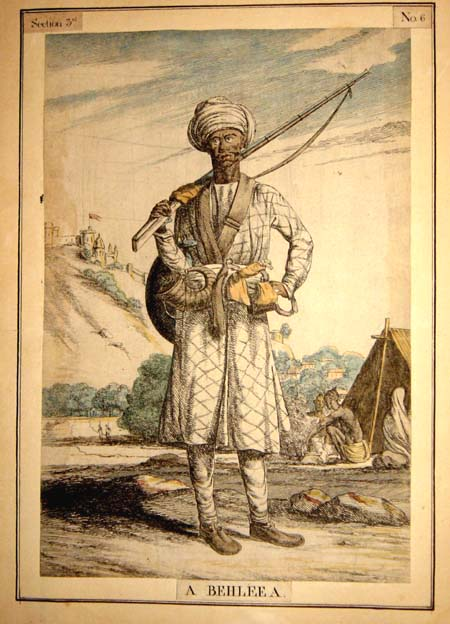
Bahelia Soldier (Behleea) in "Solvyns, A Collection of Two Hundred and Fifty Coloured Etchings (1799)"

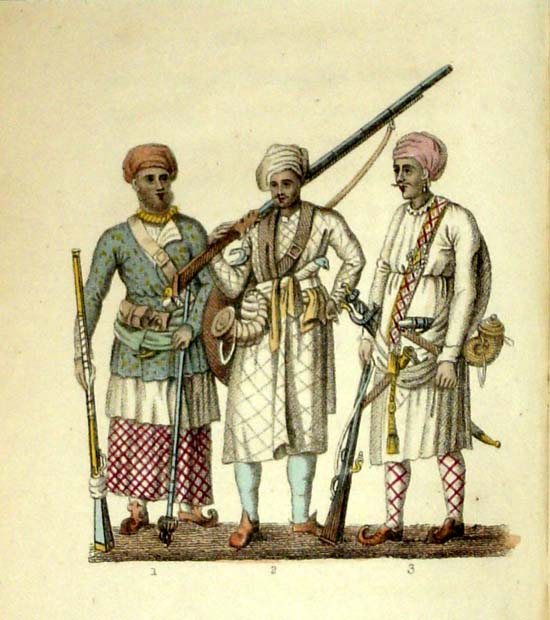
(1) A Seapoy in the Native Attire; (2) A Hindoo Soldier; (3) A Brigbasi

The Bahelias are mentioned as soldiers of various kings. They have been described as primitive Hindu soldiers and sources state presence of their armies from Kashmir to Kashi, even in South India.

Maharaja Balwant Singhji of Banaras (Kashi) had an army of Baheliyas. The Maharaja's Bahelia army had fought the British in their raid battle. The Baheliya army had also fought against the Nawabs on behalf of Maharaj. They used to kill the Nawab's men in plunder.

Great freedom fighter Subedar Tika Singh had a magnificent role in the 1857 freedom struggle at Kanpur. He belonged to Baheliya community and was basically from Baheliya Purwa village of Fatepur. He was the one who convinced Nana Saheb to revolt against Britishers. He was thereafter made General and played a vital role in the struggle.

Baba Gayadin Dubey was the Zamindar of Korani village of Fatepur, Uttar Pradesh. He had 62 villages. He had a very good army of 200 Baheliya soldiers. He along with his soldiers supported the revolutionaries in the 1857 Independence struggle and marched against his judge friend, who at the end had to commit suicide.

The Baheliya community has a long history of being a source of manpower in India. They long provided a source of military recruitment in India. They were foot soldiers in various armies. Balthazar Solvyns described Baheliya soldier as a primitive Hindu soldier and stated that Baheliya used matchlocks, a horn was their powder pouch and their sabres were more or less curved. They wore long trousers, very heavy shoes and in general their whole dress was very heavy and cumbersome. The Bahelia lived under tents and fed as the Hindu soldier upon rice and water.

They were also appointed as Governors under the Mughals. During the reign of Tuglaqs in Delhi in the 14th century, a certain Sanidhi, an African and a Baheliya were appointed as joint governor with the title of hazari, at the fort of Chunar on the bank of Ganga near Benaras. A jagir of 27 villages were conferred on them. It is stated that the Chunar fort fell before a general of Muhammad Shah, who appointed a Bahelia as governor of the fort. The family of the Bahelias retained the office, with a permanence very rare in Indian history, till the surrender of the fortress to the British after the battle of Buxar in 1764.

The bahelias were foot soldiers who from the sources are known to have used match-lock guns, but their country of origin remains shrouded. They appear in many contemporary sources for battles in Bengal and Bihar, but they are rarely described in detail due to the importance placed upon cavalry rather than foot-soldiers. For the most part it appears that they were used mainly for defensive purposes.

Baheliyas were noted for archery. They had a small village under the fort of Ghazipur, which is still famous by the name of "Bhelian ka Purva", but now there is only one house of the Baheliya.

Bahelias were foot soldiers who generally used matchlock guns. It seems word Bahelia was used as generic term to denote the musket men of those regions. Contemporary sources mention the presence of Bahelia musket men in all the battle fields of eighteenth century Bengal and Bihar. The Chief Commander of the Bahelias was styled as Bakshi (paymaster) Chidan (Chaitan) Hazari. The Bakshi of Bahelias fought for Alivardi in the battle of Gheria and an anonymous Bakshi of the Bahelias was present when Sardar Khan and Shamshir Khan led their fateful action at Azimabad. The participation of the Bahelias in the rebellion of Sardar Khan and Shamshir Khan in 1748 suggests their close relationship with Afgans.

During the Seventeenth century they were conspicuous as footsoldiers fighting under Mughal commanders. Mirza Nathan mention them as serving in Bengal in 1692, the Mughal fauzdar of Kanchipuram in South India had many Baheliya in his service who went over to Marathas after a battle. In 1700, hundred of Baheliya footmen were killed as a result of ill-timed explosion during the seize of Satara by Aurangzeb, the survivors enraged at the carelessness of their Mughal Commanders set fire to the seize batteries as a substitute for the proper cremation of their brother, Sons and friends.

== Origin ==
They are a tribal community of hunters and bird catchers, and the origin of their name is from the Sanskrit vyadka, meaning one who pierces. They are mainly involved in bird catching, extracting honey from beehives and picking peacock feathers for the manufacture of fans.

W. Crooke states there are others, who, though they lead a partially nomadic life, seldom offend against the law. Typical among these are the Baheliya or hunter, and the Chiryamar or fowler. The former, whenever he can secure a gun licence, wanders in the jungle and shoots game for sale in towns. To the east he is a fine, bold, athletic fellow. From this caste are drawn many of the best Shikaris, who track down game and arrange shooting parties for European sportsmen. It is he who ties up the young buffalo as a bait for a tiger, and at the first blush of dawn steals through the jungle and often watches the brute sleeping the sleep of repletion beside his victim. Some of them are exceedingly plucky in such dangerous work, and their knowledge of woodcraft, the habits of game, the marking down of footsteps in the sand of a dry watercourse, are often admirable.

Historically, the Baheliya community worked as game trackers and organizers for hunting parties. Accounts from European and Indian hunters described them as skilled outdoorsmen and physically adept trackers.

== Present circumstances ==
Traditionally the Baheliya economic activity revolved around bird catching and selling honey. In addition, their main economic activity remains manufacturing fans from peacock feathers. These fans are then sold to Bania middlemen, who sell them on in cities such as Kolkata and Delhi Each of their settlement contains an informal caste council, known as a biradari panchayat. This consist of five members who are elected by community members. The panchayat acts as instrument of social control, dealing with issues such as divorce and adultery.

In Bengal the traditional occupation of the Bahelias was that of watchman and soldiers under Maharaja Krishna Chandra Roy. Later on they became businessmen and cultivators. The 2011 Census of India for Uttar Pradesh showed the Baheliya population as 143,442.
