= Kori (caste) =

Weaver caste of Uttar Pradesh

Kori is an Indian caste, who were traditionally fishermen (in coastal areas), weavers (in Northern States) and farmers (especially in Gujarat).

Other names for this caste include Banodha, Vaish, Koli, Mahour, Mahawar, Anuragi, Kabirpanthi and Julaha.

The Kori are classified as a Scheduled Caste in the states of Haryana, Himachal Pradesh, Madhya Pradesh, Odisha, Punjab, Rajasthan, Uttar Pradesh, Chhattisgarh, and Uttarakhand as well as in the Union Territory of Chandigarh. In the past the Kori had OBC status in Meerut, Agra, Rohilkhand and its neighbouring cities.

In Delhi, Rajasthan, Gujarat, Maharashtra and Southern States the Kori caste is known as Koli.

The Kori scheduled caste population in Uttar Pradesh at the 2011 census of India was 2,293,937. The Kori's traditional caste councils, plans and implements welfare activities and also settles disputes. Imposition of cash fine is a form of punishment inflicted by the council.

== Etymology ==
The name "Kori" is associated to "kora" which is refers to the White or clean cloth in Hindi, due to traditional profession related to weaving.

== History ==
Harold Gould noted in his research of the jajmani system in Uttar Pradesh that by the 1960s, all of the Koris in the villages studied by him had adopted roles as agriculturist, ploughmen, and midwives, because industrialisation had made their traditional occupation as weavers redundant.
