= Musahar =

Dalit community in the Gangetic plain and the Terai

Bhuiyan (Manjhi)
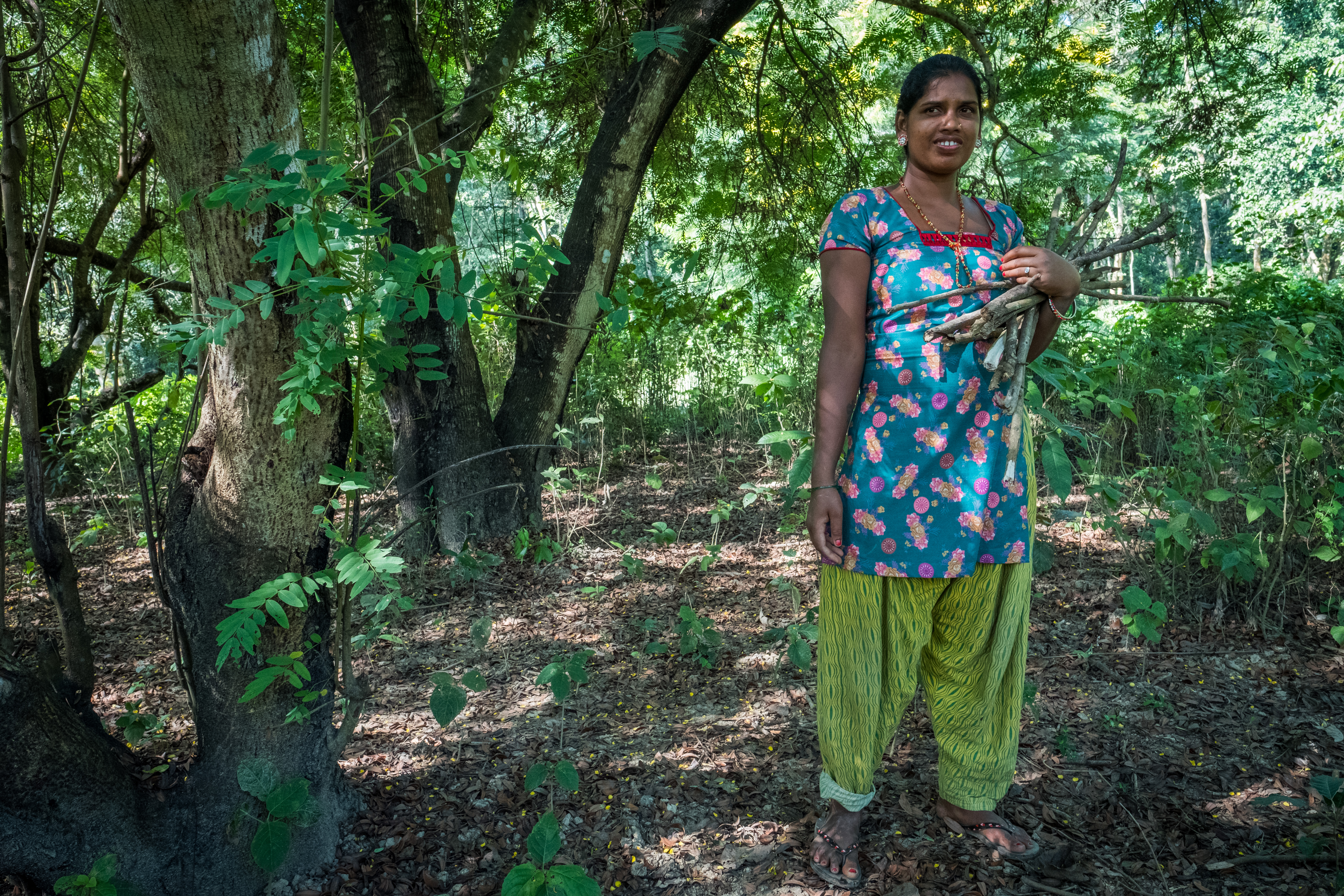
- Musahar woman collecting firewood near Sauraha, Chitwan District, Nepal
- Religions: Hinduism
- Languages: Bhojpuri, Magahi, Maithili, Khortha
- Country: India, Nepal, Bangladesh
- Original state: Uttar Pradesh, Bihar, Jharkhand
- Region: Eastern Gangetic Plain and the Terai
- Family names: Manjhi, Bhuiyan
- Notable members: Dashrath Manjhi, Jitan Ram Manjhi, Bhagwati Devi

Musahar or Mushahar (Nepali: मुसहर जाति) are a Dalit community found in the eastern Gangetic plain and the Terai. They are also known as Rishidev, Sada, Manjhi, Banbasi. The other names of the Musahar are Bhuiyan and Rajawar.

== Origins and history ==
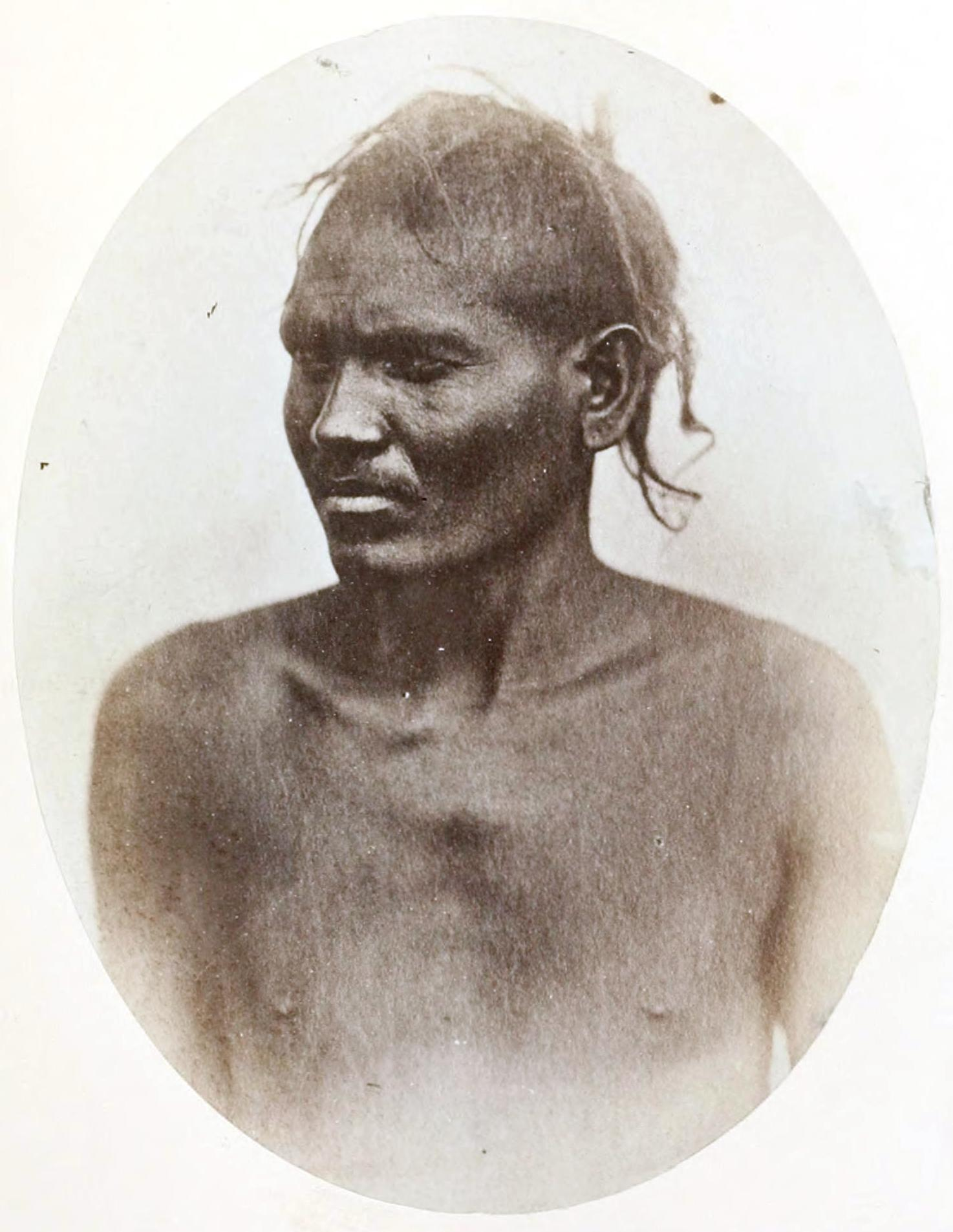
Photo of a Musahar taken as part of a caste survey by Herbert Hope Risley in Bihar, 1890s

=== Etymology ===
In Bihar, the word Musahar is said to derive from the Bhojpuri mūs+ahar (literally rat eater), on account of their traditional occupation as rat catchers. Risley thinks that Musahar is the name that their Hindu masters gave them because of their non-Aryan and unclean habit of eating field mice. Nesfield preferred the word Mushera, based on an old folktale which signifies flesh-seeker or hunter. According to him, the word ‘Mushera’ (another variant of the term Musahar) derives from masu (flesh) and hera (seeker), possibly a more comprehensive term than 'rat-catcher'.

=== Origins ===
According to a local legend, Lord Brahma created man and gave him the horse to ride. The first Musahar decided to dig holes in the belly of the horse to fix his feet as he rode. This offended Lord Brahma, who cursed him and his descendants to be rat-catchers. Herbert Hope Risley, in his 1881 survey of castes and tribes of Bengal, speculated that the Musahars were an offshoot of the hunter-gatherer Bhuiya from the Chota Nagpur Plateau who migrated to the Gangetic plains approximately 6-7 generations prior to his survey, around 300–350 years before present. It is now believed that this theory is generally correct. Modern genetic studies have found Musahars cluster very closely with Munda peoples like the Santhals and the Hos, and demonstrate similar haplogroup frequencies for both maternal and paternal lineages. Some Musahars have claimed that they once had their own language but it was lost when they migrated. This process has been observed in another tribal population, the Baiga, who also once spoke a Munda language but shifted to an Indo-European language in the distant past. However, unlike the Musahar, the Baiga remained isolated from Brahminical society at large and so were seen as a tribe rather than a caste.

== Present circumstances ==
The Musahar consists of three endogamous clans: Bhagat, Sakatiya and Turkahia. They are now mostly landless agricultural labourers and sometimes still have to resort to rat catching to survive during lean times. They are one of the most marginalised castes in India, even below Dalits. George Kunnath claims that there "is and has been an internal hierarchy between the various Dalit castes". According to Kunnath, the Dusadhs are considered the highest while the Musahars are considered the lowest within the Dalit groups. The Musahar are Hindu, and celebrate most local Hindu festivals like Holi, Diwali, Chhath Puja, Durga Puja. They also believe in a number of tribal deities, including Dinabhadri and Buniya Baba. Musahars also have their own rituals like the kul pooja, in which participants bathe in boiling milk to worship ancestors. They also offer liquor during poojas and weddings.

The Musahar are found throughout eastern Uttar Pradesh, southern Nepal and Bihar, and are employed in Bihar's stone quarries. Many have also emigrated to the states of Punjab and Haryana as agricultural labourers, with many Nepali Musahars working as migrant labourers for 6 months at a time. They speak Bhojpuri, Magahi, Maithili and Khortha but many now have working knowledge of Hindi.

== Distribution ==
Almost all Musahars live in rural areas, with a mere 3% living in the city. In the rural areas, Musahar are primarily bonded agricultural labourers, but often go without work for as much as eight months in a year. Children work alongside their parents in the fields or as rag-pickers, earning as little as ₹25-30 ($0.35-0.40) a day. The Musahar literacy rate is 3% overall, and falls to an abysmal 1% among women. By some estimates, as many as 85% of some villages of Musahars suffer from malnutrition and with access to health centres scant, diseases such as malaria and kala-azar are prevalent.

The Government of Bihar operates the Mahadalit Mission, which partially funds some programs to expand education and other social welfare programs for the Musahar.

The 2011 Census of India for Uttar Pradesh showed the Musahar population as around 250,000. The same census also showed around 250,000 Mushahars in Bihar. However, Musahar activists have disputed this figure, claiming the Mushahar population in Bihar is over 4,000,000. Over 230,000 Musahars live in Nepal, most in conditions similar to their counterparts in India.

Some Musahars in Uttar Pradesh wish to be listed as a Scheduled Tribe, citing their claimed tribal roots that they saw in tribals from other areas of the country as well as the perception that richer Dalit castes like other Scheduled Castes were the only ones with access to reservation benefits.

Mushahars from the Chota Nagpur Plateau were transported by the British to the Sylhet region where they were made to work in tea plantations. They can still be found in areas in Habiganj such as Teliapara and Rema where they continue the same livelihood. They are an ethnic minority with a mere population of 3,000. They are divided into 6 clans; Trihutia, Maghaiya, Ghatwar, Darwar, Khairawar and Rikhian.

== Musahar in Nepal ==
The 2011 Nepal census classifies the Musahar within the broader social group of Madheshi Dalit. At the time of the Nepali census of 2011, 234,490 people (0.9% of the population of Nepal) were Musahar. The frequency of Musahar by province was as follows:

- Madhesh Province (3.0%)
- Koshi Province (1.4%)
- Lumbini Province (0.1%)
- Bagmati Province (0.0%)
- Gandaki Province (0.0%)
- Karnali Province (0.0%)
- Sudurpashchim Province (0.0%)

The frequency of Musahar was higher than national average (0.9%) in the following districts:

- Siraha (6.3%)
- Saptari (6.1%)
- Mahottari (3.7%)
- Sunsari (3.4%)
- Morang (3.0%)
- Dhanusha (2.6%)
- Sarlahi (1.8%)
- Parsa (1.6%)
- Bara (1.4%)
- Udayapur (1.2%)
- Parasi (1.1%)
- Rautahat (1.1%)

== See also ==
- Rat-catcher
