= Bansphor =

Regions with significant populations
- India

Languages
- • Hindi • Awadhi • Khari Boli

Religion
- Hinduism 100%

Related ethnic groups
- • Muslim Bansphor •

The Bansphor are a Hindu caste found in the state of Uttar Pradesh, India.

== Origin ==
The community get their name from the Hindi words bans, meaning bamboo and phorna which means to split. They are a community that were traditionally involved in the manufacture of bamboo items for household usage. According to traditions, they are one of the seven sub-groups of the Dom community. Their own traditions refer to a Bans Rajah, a prince who is said to have ruled in the Awadh region, from whom the community descend. They are found throughout Uttar Pradesh, with special concentrations in the districts of Farrukhabad, Saharanpur and Pilibhit in western Uttar Pradesh, and Sitapur, Kheri, Hardoi, Pratapgarh and Lucknow in Awadh, and Mirzapur and Lalitpur in southern Uttar Pradesh. The western Bansphor speak Khari boli, while those in Awadh speak Awadhi. A section of the Bansphor in Saharanpur and Moradabad have converted to Islam, and now form a distinct community of Muslim Bansphor.

== Present circumstances ==
The Bansphor practice strict community endogamy, as well as clan exogamy, which a common practice among most North Indian Hindus. Their clans are called gotras, the main ones being the Mahawati, Chamkel, Gaushal, Samudra, Nahar, Kalai and Saraiha. Marriages do not occur with the Muslim Bansphor community. The Bansphor live in multi-caste villages, but occupy their own distinct quarters. Each of their settlement contains an informal caste council, known as a panchayat. The panchayat is headed by a pradhan, a position which is heredity. In addition, there is an overarching panchayat of between three and four villages, which headed by a chaudhary. The panchayat resolves any intra-community dispute, as well as acting an instrument of social control. They are Hindus, except for the now-distinct community of Muslim Bansphor, and have Hanuman as their tribal deity.

The 2011 Census of India for Uttar Pradesh showed the Bansphor population as 59,804.
