= Bajgi =

Hindu caste found in the states of Uttar Pradesh and Uttarakhand in India

The Bajgi are a Hindu caste found in the states of Uttar Pradesh and Uttarakhand in India and have been granted status of Scheduled Castes in the states. The Bajgi are also known as Auji, Das, Jhumarya and Dholi.

The community get their name from the Garhwali word bajana which means to play an instrument. They are said to have acquired this name on account of their traditional occupation which was to act as drummers in the courts of the temples of different village deities. They were also called to play on special occasions such as marriages. They are found throughout Garhwal, and speak Garhwali. The Bajgi are a sub-group with the Shilpkar ethnic group of Uttarakhand with a population of 23,732 as of 2011 census. A few are also found in the adjoining districts of Uttar Pradesh such as Bijnor, with a population of 886. In Jaunsar-Bawar, they are clubbed under the term Kolta and the members are recognized as Jaunsaris.

The Bajgi are still mainly employed as village musicians, with tailoring and barbering as their main subsidiary occupation. A few are employed as landless agricultural labourers. The Bajgi are Hindu, but incorporate folk beliefs such as belief in local deities such as Nirankar, Bhairab, Goril, Durga, Jakh and Nag.
