= Kol people =

Tribes of eastern India

The Kol people referred to a group of tribal communities of Chotanagpur in eastern parts of India. Historically, the Mundas, Santhal, Ho, and Bhumijs were called Kols by the British.

It also refers to some tribes and castes of south-east Uttar Pradesh, Madhya Pradesh and Maharashtra. They are mostly indigenous people and dependent on forest produce to make a living, and they have their own land. The caste has several exogamous clans, including the Bhil, Chero, Monasi, Rautia, Raut, Gauthiya Rojaboria, kol-teli‚ Rautel and Thakuria. They speak the Baghelkhandi dialect. Around 1 million lives in Madhya Pradesh while another 5 lakh lives in Uttar Pradesh.

Once spelled "Kole", the swaths of land they inhabited in the 19th-century were called "Kolean".

== Etymology ==
Kol is a corruption of general Munda autonyms meaning "human being" (Santali hɔɽ, Mundari hoɽo, Ho hoː, Kharia kar, Korku koro). The term Kola mentioned in Rigveda. According to legend, Yayati, the son of Nahus divided his kingdom for his five sons. Then after ten generation, India was divided among four brothers; Pandya, Krala, Kola and Chola.

== History ==
Colonel Edward Tuite Dalton referred to non-Aryan Kolarian and Dravidian tribals of Chotanagpur as Kol such as Munda, Oraon, Ho, Santal, Bhumij, Juang etc. in his writings in 1867. According to him, the word is epithets of abuse applied by the Brahmin races to the aboriginals who opposed their settlements. In Chotanagpur, the term kol generally applied to Munda and Oraon. Oraon and Munda celebrate the same festivals, but they don't intermarry among themselves.

Later, Colonel Dalton classified Oraon as Dravidian and Munda, along with other Kols such as Ho, Bhumij as Kolarian after observing their customs and traditions which were distinct.
