= Beldar =

Nomadic Indian caste

The Beldar are a historically nomadic caste, originally from Northern India and now inhabiting many other parts of that country.

== History and origin ==
The community are the traditionally natives of North India, and are similar to the Odh communities, who are the natives of west India. They also claim common ancestry with the Kewat community, who similarly refer to themselves as Odhs.

In Maharashtra, the Beldar are found mainly in the districts of Aurangabad, Nasik, Beed, Pune, Amravati, Akola, Yawatmal, Ahmednagar, Sholapur, Kolhapur, Sangli, Satara, Ratnagiri and the city of Mumbai. The Beldar claim to have immigrated from Rajasthan some five centuries ago. They still speak Beldari language among themselves and Marathi with outsiders. The community is strictly endogamous, and consists of a number of exogamous clans. Their main clans are the Chapula, Narora, Davawar, Jailwar, Faatara, Horwar, Chhapawar, Tuse, Pannewar, Mahore, Basniwar, Bahr, Jajure, Gorala and Udainwar.

== Present circumstances ==
The Beldar of Uttar Pradesh are still mainly involved in their tradition of navvies. They are employed by the state in the constructions of roads. Generally, whole families participate in the construction industry. Many Beldar are nomadic, shifting from place to place, looking for work at construction sites. A small number of Beldar are also involved in the selling of fruits and vegetables. The Beldar are a Hindu community, and are found throughout the state, speaking a number of dialects of Hindi.

The traditional occupation of the Beldar in Maharashtra was masonry. Many are still employed in the construction industry. The community is not entirely landless, some Beldar from Nagpur and Chandrapur in Maharashtra are land owners. A considerable number of Beldar are also employed by the various brick kilns.

The 2011 Census of India for Uttar Pradesh, where they were classified as a Scheduled Caste, showed the Beldar population as 189,614.
