= Majhwar =

The Majhwar are a Scheduled Caste found in the state of Uttar Pradesh and Uttarakhand in India. They had been engaged in the profession of labour and livestock cultivation, along with engagement in agriculture with low-status in society.

The 2011 Census of India for Uttar Pradesh showed the Majhwar Scheduled Caste population as 23,123.
