= Chero =

Hindu caste in India

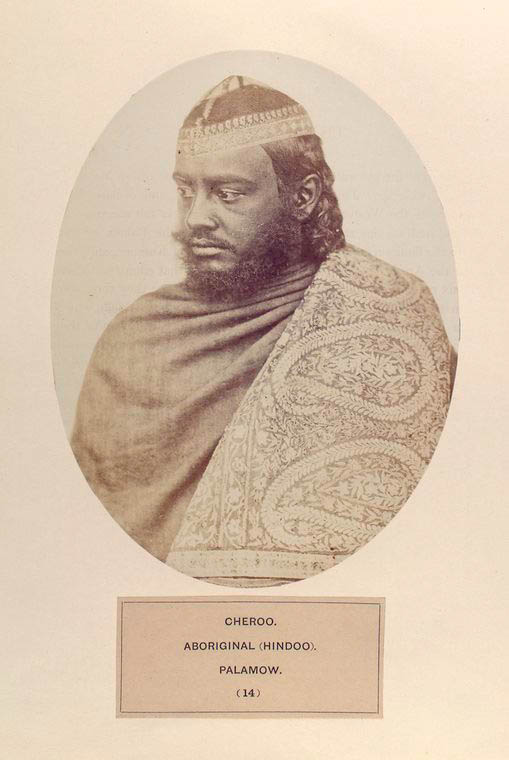
- A Chero man in 1868.

Regions with significant populations
- India

Languages
- Theth Nagpuri

Religion
- Sarna

The Chero is a caste found in the states of Bihar, Jharkhand and Uttar Pradesh in India.

== History and origin ==
The community claims to have originally been tribal people. The Chero are essentially one of many tribal communities, such as the Bhar, Pasi and Kol, that inhabit the southeastern corner of Uttar Pradesh. Chero dynasty was ruling parts of Uttar Pradesh, Bihar and Jharkhand until they were deposed by the Rajputs and the East India Company. They are now found in a territory extending from Allahabad in the west to Muzaffarpur in the east. The Chero have two sub-divisions, the Mahto and Chaudhary.

In Bihar, the Chero are known as Charwa or Cheru and in Palamu, they are known as the Barahazari, Terahazari and Pachchasi. The community is mainly found in Jharkhand, especially in Ranchi, Gumla, Simdega, khunti and west singhbhhum. Those of Palamau were substantial landowners.

== Present circumstances ==
The Chero are classified as a Scheduled Tribe in Sonbhadra and Varanasi districts, but a Scheduled Caste in most parts of Uttar Pradesh. They are also classified as a Scheduled Tribe in Bihar and Jharkhand. They have OBC status in Odisha.

The community has a traditional caste council that maintains a strong social control on the community. With Sanskritization they are Hindu, but also worship several their own indigenous tribal deities, such as Sairi-ma, Ganwar Bhabhani and Dulha Deo. The Chero of Jharkhand have two sub-divisions, the Barahazari and the Terahazari. These two groups are endogamous, and do not intermarry. They practice clan exogamy, and their main clans are the Mawar, Kuanr, Mahato, Rajkumar, Manjhia, Wamwat, and Hantiyas. These clans are of unequal status, and the Chero practice clan hypergamy. The Chero of Jharkhand are mainly farmers, with many were substantial landowners.

The 2011 Census of India for Uttar Pradesh showed the Chero Scheduled Caste population as 596.
