= Panika =

Hindu community

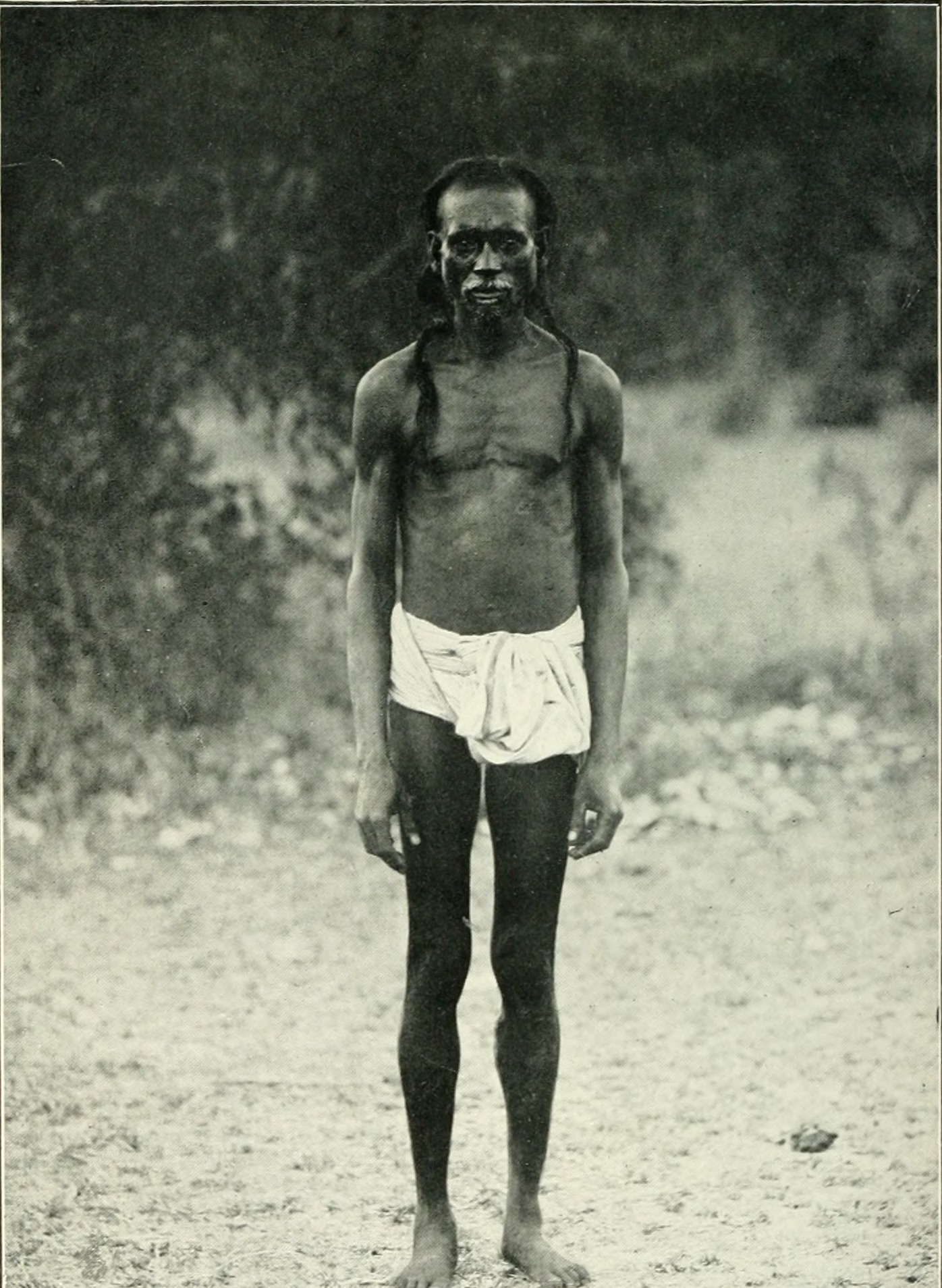
- "A Panka, Dravidian weaver, Southern Hills (P. 136)" (Natives of Northern India (1907)

Regions with significant populations
- Chhattisgarh, Madhya Pradesh, Uttar Pradesh

Languages
- Chhattisgarhi, Hindi, Odia

Religion
- Hinduism

The Panika are a Hindu community found in the Indian states of Chhattisgarh, Jharkhand, Madhya Pradesh, Odisha and Uttar Pradesh. Traditionally they are weaver. They are also known as Panka and Panikar.

== Etymology ==
They used to made Pankha(fan). Panika is mispronounced name of Pankha.

== Official classification ==
The classification of the Panika under India's system of positive discrimination varies from one state to another. The entire community had been classified as a Scheduled Tribe (ST) by the Government of India in 1949 but in 1971 the Government of Madhya Pradesh redesignated those in what was then that state's Chhattisgarh region as being an Other Backward Class (OBC). The OBC designation was maintained when the independent Chhattisgarh state was created in 2001 and it remains thus as of 2018, although as recently as 2013 politicians had promised to investigate whether they could be reclassified as an ST. In Madhya Pradesh, as of 2018, they are categorised as an ST in some districts and as OBC in others.

The varying reservation status has an effect when Panikas marry. A spokesman interviewed in 2013 noted that "If a girl comes to Chhattisgarh after marrying, she will have to loss her tribal credential. If a boy from Madhya Pradesh marries a girl from Chhattisgarh, she will get the recognition of a tribal."
