= Exogamy =

Social arrangement which only allows marriage outside a social group

Exogamy is the social norm of mating or marrying outside one's social group. The group defines the scope and extent of exogamy, and the rules and enforcement mechanisms that ensure its continuity. One form of exogamy is dual exogamy, in which two groups continually intermarry with each other.

In social science, exogamy is viewed as a combination of two related aspects: biological and cultural. Biological exogamy is the marriage of people who are not blood relatives. This is regulated by incest taboos and laws against incest. Cultural exogamy is marrying outside a specific cultural group; the opposite is endogamy, marriage within a social group.

== Biology of exogamy ==
Exogamy often results in two individuals that are not closely genetically related marrying each other; that is, outbreeding as opposed to inbreeding. This may benefit offspring as it reduces the risk of the offspring inheriting two copies of a defective gene. Nancy Wilmsen Thornhill states that the drive in humans to not reproduce or be attracted to one's immediate family is evolutionarily adaptive, as it reduces the risk of children having genetic defects caused by inbreeding, as a result of inheriting two copies of a deleterious recessive gene.

In one Old Order Amish society, inbreeding increases the risk of "neonatal and postneonatal mortality". In French populations, the children of first cousins develop cystinosis at a greater rate than the general population.

== Cultural exogamy ==
Cultural exogamy is the custom of marrying outside a specified group of people to which a person belongs. Thus, persons may be expected to marry outside their totem clan(s) or other groups, in addition to outside closer blood relatives. For instance among the Baganda of Uganda, it's taboo and illegal for two people from the same totem clan to marry.

Researchers have proposed different theories to account for the origin of exogamy. Edvard Westermarck said an aversion to marriage between blood relatives or near kin emerged with a parental deterrence of incest. From a genetic point of view, aversion to breeding with close relatives results in fewer congenital diseases. If one person has a faulty gene, breeding outside his group increases the chances that his partner will have another functional type gene and their child may not suffer the defect. Outbreeding favours the condition of heterozygosity, that is having two nonidentical copies of a given gene. J. F. McLennan holds that exogamy was due originally to a scarcity of women among small bands. Men were obliged to seek wives from other groups, including marriage by capture, and exogamy developed as a cultural custom.

Émile Durkheim derives exogamy from totemism. He said that a people had religious respect for the blood of a totemic clan, for the clan totem is a god and is present especially in the blood, a sacred substance.

In most forms of Hinduism, people can only marry outside their gotra which is a traditional group of people who may be distantly related but have been living in the same area or have an ancestral home in the same area.

Morgan maintains that exogamy was introduced to prevent marriage between blood relations, especially between brother and sister, which had been common in an earlier state of promiscuity. Frazer says that exogamy was begun to maintain the survival of family groups, especially when single families became larger political groups.

Claude Lévi-Strauss introduced the "Alliance Theory" of exogamy, that is, that small groups must force their members to marry outside so as to build alliances with other groups. According to this theory, groups that engaged in exogamy would flourish, while those that did not would all die, either literally or because they lacked sufficient ties for cultural and economic exchange, leaving them at a disadvantage. The exchange of men or women served as a uniting force between groups.

=== Dual exogamy ===
Dual exogamy, in which two groups continually intermarry with each other, is a traditional form of arranging marriages in numerous modern societies and in many societies described in classical literature. It can be matrilineal or patrilineal. Some Indigenous Australian Nations use groupings often called "skins" or "skin groups" to further structure Kinship Systems that guide cultural practices, including marriages. It was historically widespread in the Turkic societies, Taï societies (Ivory Coast), Eskimo, among Ob-Ugrians and others. In tribal societies, the dual exogamy union lasted for many generations, ultimately uniting the groups initially unrelated by blood or language into a single tribe or nation.

== Linguistic exogamy ==
Linguistic exogamy is a form of cultural exogamy in which marriage occurs between speakers of different languages. The custom is common among indigenous groups in the northwest Amazon, such as the Tucano tribes.

== See also ==
- Chinese surname: surname exogamy in China
- Emmanuel Todd, author of several demographic-history textbooks on the impact of exogamy on political-religious ideology
- Endogamy
- Gotra: exogamous unit in India
- Heterophily
- Hypergamy
- Interfaith marriage
- Interracial marriage
- Kinship
- Miscegenation
