= Scheduled Caste and Scheduled Tribe (Prevention of Atrocities) Act, 1989 =

Affirmative action law in India

Scheduled Castes and Scheduled Tribes (Prevention of Atrocities) Act 1989 and Rules 1995

Parliament of India
- Citation: Act 33 of 1989
- Enacted by: Parliament of India
- Enacted: 11 September 1989
- Commenced: Act: 30 January 1990 Rules: 31 March 1995 (Rules notified)

Legislative history
- Introduced: 11 September 1989

Repeals
- 4 March 2014 Ordinance (overhaul: new sections, chapters and schedules added)

Amended by
- 31 October 2019, 20 August 2018 (Act Amended, S18A added), 27 June 2018 (Rules and Schedule tweaked), 14 April 2016, (Rules amended, relief and rehabilitation enhanced), 26 January 2016 (major overhaul), 23 June 2014 (Rules amended, relief and rehabilitation enhanced), 8 November 2013 (Sub-divisional VMCs and nominees).

Summary
- Preventing atrocities against the scheduled castes and scheduled tribes in India

Keywords
- Caste, Dalit, POA, SC/ST Act, Atrocities Act
- Status: In force

The Scheduled Castes and the Scheduled Tribes (Prevention of Atrocities) Act, 1989 was enacted by the Parliament of India to prevent atrocities and hate crimes against the so-called scheduled castes and scheduled tribes in the country. In popular usage, including in parliamentary debates and in the judgements of the Supreme Court of India, this law is referred to as the SC/ST Act. It is also referred to as the 'Atrocities Act', POA, and PoA.

Recognising the continuing gross indignities and offences against the scheduled castes and tribes, (defined as 'atrocities' in Section 3 of the Act) the Indian parliament enacted the Scheduled Castes and the Scheduled Tribes (Prevention of Atrocities) Act, 1989 when the existing legal provisions (such as the Protection of Civil Rights Act, 1955 and the Indian Penal Code, 1860) were found to be inadequate to check these caste and ethnicity based hate crimes.

The Act was passed in Parliament of India on 11 September 1989 and notified on 30 January 1990. It was comprehensively amended in 2015 (including renumbering sub-sections of Section 3), and notified on 26 January 2016. It was amended again in 2018 and 2019.

The rules were notified on 31 March 1995. They were comprehensively amended and notified on 14 April 2016. There were a few amendments to the rules and annexures in 2018.

== Background ==
=== Atrocities rooted in caste system ===
A study conducted by the National Commission for SCs and STs in 1990 on Atrocities on Scheduled Castes and Scheduled Tribes: Causes and Remedies pointed out various causal factors for atrocities: land disputes; land alienation; bonded labour; indebtedness; non-payment of minimum wages; caste prejudice and practice of untouchability; political factions on caste lines; refusal to perform traditional works such as digging burial pits, arranging cremations, removing carcasses of dead animals and beating drums; etc. The deep root for such atrocities is traceable to the caste system, which "encompasses a complete ordering of social groups on the basis of the so-called ritual purity. A person is considered a member of the caste into which s/he is born and remains within that caste until death…."

Considered ritually impure, Dalits have been physically and socially excluded from caste Hindu society, denied basic resources and services, and discriminated against in all areas of life. Consequently, they face various forms of exploitation, insults, and violence, as well as degrading practices of untouchability. The Scheduled Tribes are equally exploited on grounds of not falling within the caste system but having a distinct culture and worldview of their own. "Women belonging to these castes and tribes bore double burden. They were exploited by caste and gender, and were vulnerable and powerless against sexual exploitation".

The post-Independence era was marked by frequent instances of atrocities springing up across the country: for example, the assassination of the young, educated Dalit leader Emmanuel Sekaran in Tamil Nadu for defying the untouchability-based interdicts on Scheduled Castes (SCs, also called Dalits), which resulted in the Ramanathapuram riots of 1957; the Kilavenmani massacre of 42 Dalits in 1968 in Tamil Nadu; the gruesome killing of Dalit Kotesu in Kanchikacherla in 1969 in Andhra Pradesh; the killings of 10 Scheduled Tribes (STs, also called Adivasis, literally 'first dweller') by police in connection with a land dispute in Indravalli in Andhra Pradesh in 1978. All such events shook the then national leadership. Hence, under pressure from Dalit MPs, the Government of India started monitoring atrocities against Dalits from 1974, and in the case of Adivasis from 1981 onwards, with special focus on murder, rape, arson and grievous hurt.

Atrocities continued to increase in ferocity and frequency – for example, in Bihar the massacres of Dalits at Belchi in 1979 and at Pipra in 1980; in Uttar Pradesh the massacre following a Dalit bridegroom riding on horseback at Kafalta in 1980; in Madhya Pradesh the killing of Bacchdas in Mandsaur district in 1982; in Bihar the killing in police firing on 15 tribals at Banjhi in Sahebganj district in 1985. In all such cases, the Indian state at both the national and state levels avoided addressing basic contradictions, vulnerabilities and causative factors; the treatment was mainly symptomatic and palliative instead of the required radical solutions.

=== Continuing widespread prevalence ===
As late as 29 October 2021, the Supreme Court of India was constrained to observe that Atrocities against members of the SCs and STs are not a thing of the past. They continue to be a reality in our society even today. Hence the statutory provisions which have been enacted by Parliament as a measure of protecting the constitutional rights of persons belonging to the Scheduled Castes and Scheduled Tribes must be complied with and enforced conscientiously (CJI Dhananjaya Y Chandrachud and Justice BV Nagarathna).

They went on to note that several members of the scheduled communities “face insurmountable hurdles in accessing justice from the stage of filing the complaint to the conclusion of the trial” and that they “specifically suffer on account of procedural lapses in the criminal justice system”.

They noted that due to the fear of retribution from members of dominant caste groups, ignorance, or police apathy, many victims do not register complaints in the first place and when they do so, the police officials are reluctant to register complaints or do not record allegations accurately.

“Eventually, if the case does get registered, the victims and witnesses are vulnerable to intimidation, violence, and social and economic boycott. Further, many perpetrators of caste-based atrocities get away scot free due to shoddy investigations and the negligence of prosecuting advocates,” rued the bench. “This results in low conviction rates under the SC/ST Act, giving rise to the erroneous perception that cases registered under the Act are false and that it is being misused. On the contrary, the reality is that many acquittals are a result of improper investigation and prosecution of crime, leading to insufficient evidence”.

== Legislative history ==
=== Constitutional roots ===
The Act is rooted in Articles 15 and 17 of the Indian Constitution. Article 15 prohibits discrimination on the basis of caste. Article 17 of the Constitution of India states that ‘Untouchability is abolished and its practice in any form is forbidden. The enforcement of any disability arising out of “Untouchability” shall be an offence punishable in accordance with law’.

=== The Untouchability (Offences) Act, 1955 ===
Five years after the Constitution of India was adopted, the necessary legislation - the Untouchability (Offences) Act (UOA) 1955 - was enacted. It was amended and renamed in 1976 as the Protection of Civil Rights Act (PCRA).

Though UOA did not precisely define the offence, it was a major step forward, and had several enabling provisions. UOA recognised ‘wilful negligence’ [UOA S10] and was proactive in that it stated clearly that the presumption of court would be that the crime arose from ‘untouchability’ and it was the defendant who should prove that it wasn't [UOA S12]. The Act was farsighted in that it recognised the culpability of companies and those in charge, including their directors [UOA S14].

However, due to legal loopholes, the levels of punishments being less (compared to those of the Indian Penal Code, 1860 (IPC)), and the law and order machinery being neither professionally trained nor socially inclined to implement such social legislation, a more comprehensive deterrent Act was required to protect the scheduled communities from inter-community violence committed by the dominant communities.

=== The Protection of Civil Rights Act, 1955 ===
It was later recognised that the Untouchability (Offences) Act 1955 was not sufficient to eradicate untouchability and to punish the perpetrators. So the parliament brought about many changes to UOA after 21 years on 19 November 1976 (the then prime minister's birthday), and renamed it the Protection of Civil Rights Act (PCRA), 1955. In the 1976 amendment, discrimination on the basis of untouchability was also brought under this Act [PCRA S4]. 'Untouchability' as a result of religious and social disabilities was made punishable. The amendments made it clear that all offences under this Act are cognisable [PCRA S15(1)]. It made mandatory the provision of legal aid, appointment of supervising officers, setting up of special courts and committees, and periodic survey of the working of the provisions of this Act to suggest measures for the better implementation [PCRA S15A2]. It even had provision for state and central government annual implementation reports being placed before parliament [PCRA S15A4]. Much of this is carried forward to POA and its amendments, though the liability of companies has been removed.

However, PCRA suffered from severe infirmities, chief among them being that it did not even recognise many of the caste based crimes, was too lenient, and did not have an empowered mechanism to monitor the implementation of the Act (especially given that the police and judiciary were drawn from the same social milieu).

Consequently, caste based crimes continued and even increased both in intensity and scale. Under continued pressure from Dalit MPs and political leaders, the magnitude and gravity of the problem was finally recognised by Prime Minister Rajiv Gandhi. In his Independence day address on 15 August 1987, he announced that an Act would be passed, if necessary, to check atrocities. This nudged the parliament to legislate the Scheduled Castes and the Scheduled Tribes (Prevention of Atrocities) Act, 1989.

=== The POA and amendments ===
Instead of tinkering with the PCRA, the parliament of India passed a new legislation to explicitly prevent offences against the scheduled communities by members of non-scheduled communities, that would set up speedy justice, monitoring, accountability, relief, and rehabilitation mechanisms. The Scheduled Castes and the Scheduled Tribes (Prevention of Atrocities) Act (POA), 1989 was thus passed on 11 September 1989. The Act was notified in the Gazette of India, Extraordinary, Part II, sec. 3(ii), dated 29 January 1990 (notification No. S.O. 106(E)) and came into force on 30 January 1990. The rules were notified on 31 March 1995.

The 1989 Act and 1995 rules underwent substantial amendments in 2013, 2014, 2015, 2018, and 2019. The 8 November 2013 amendment to the Rules inserted Rule 17A that added vigilance and monitoring committees at the sub-divisional level, and provided for nominees of the union government in the vigilance and monitoring committees.

The rules were amended on 23 June 2014 to enhance relief and rehabilitation.

The Amendment Ordinance 2014 was signed by the president on 4 March 2014 - the last day before the model code of conduct for parliamentary elections came into force - and came into force immediately. Unsurprisingly, dominant communities campaigned for the total repeal of the Act during the parliamentary elections. Since it was an ordinance, and was not ratified by (the next) parliament within six months, it lapsed. It was then referred back to the cabinet.

It was later passed as the Amendment Act 2015 and the Amendment Rules 2016. The Amendment Act 2015 and Amendment Rules 2016 comprehensively overhauled the parent Act and Rules. The Act added Chapter IVA Section 15A (the rights of victims and witnesses), and defined dereliction of duty by officials and accountability mechanisms more precisely. It added several new offences in Section 3 and (bizarrely) renumbered the entire section since the recognised crime almost doubled. It filled several gaps in the previous version of the Act (such as adding a schedule for Section 3(2)(va) showing which offence under Section 3 should be invoked for which IPC crime) apart from making accountability of officials clearer. Section 14A to ensure time bound trials was also inserted. The amended Act 2015 came into effect on 26 January 2016.

The amended rules enhance and streamline relief and rehabilitation, with clear timelines and deliverables. The amended Rules came into effect on 14 April 2016.

The Supreme Court of India, in its verdict of 20 March 2018, banned immediate arrest of a person accused of insulting or injuring a member of a scheduled community to prevent arbitrary arrest. This led to a furore, which in turn led to a stunned parliament voting to overturn the judgement. In August 2018, the parliament passed an amendment to override the ruling (with effect from 20 August 2018) by inserting section 18A(1)(a) 'preliminary enquiry shall not be required for registration of an FIR against any person and section 18A(1)(b), the investigating officer shall not require approval for the arrest, if necessary, of any person against whom an accusation of having committed an offence under this Act has been made and no procedure, other than that provided under this Act or the Code, shall apply. The amendments categorically rule out anticipatory bail for a person accused of atrocities against the scheduled communities, notwithstanding any court order. The Supreme Court of India upheld the constitutional validity of the amendment on 10 February 2020.

On 27 June 2018 the Rules were amended to clarify that the relief provided in the Rule 15(1) contingency plan and Rule 12(4) Annexe Schedule I was in addition to relief from other sources [Rule 12(5)], removed the restriction of 25 members in the State Vigilance and Monitoring Committee [Rule 16(1)], and tweaked the relief provisions in the Rule 12(4) Annexe Schedule I.

On 31 October 2019, Section 1(2) was amended to extend the Act to the whole of India.

== Key features of the Amendment Act 2015 (No 1 of 2016) ==
The Amendment Ordinance 2014 (No 1 of 2014) was signed by the president on 4 March 2014 and came into force immediately. Since it was an ordinance, and was not ratified by (the next) parliament within six months, it lapsed. It was then referred back to the cabinet.

The Amendment Act 2015 (No 1 of 2016) was passed to replace the ordinance of 2014. The bill was introduced in parliament on 7 July 2014 and referred to the standing committee on 17 July 2014. Subsequently, it was passed by the Lok Sabha on 4 August 2015 and then by the Rajya Sabha in December 2015. The amended Act received presidential assent on 31 December 2015, was notified as Act 1 of 2016 on 1 January 2016 in the Gazette of India Extraordinary, and came into force on 26 January 2016.

The key features of the Amendment Act of 2015 are

- Addition of new categories of offences to the existing 19 punishable offences. The following new offences were added. To cite a few: tonsuring of head, moustache, or similar acts which are derogatory to the dignity of Dalits and Adivasis; garlanding with chappals; denying access to irrigation facilities or forest rights; dispose or carry human or animal carcasses, or to dig graves; using or permitting manual scavenging; dedicating Dalit women as devadasi; abusing in caste name; perpetrating witchcraft atrocities; imposing social or economic boycott; preventing Dalit and Adivasi candidates filing of nomination to contest elections; hurting the modesty of Dalit/Adivasi woman by removing her garments; forcing to leave house, village or residence; defiling objects sacred to SCs and STs; touching a woman or uses words, acts or gestures of a sexual nature against women.
- Addition of IPC offences attracting committed against Dalits or Adivasis as punishable offences under the POA Act. Presently, only those offences listed in IPC as attracting punishment of 10 years or more and committed on Dalits/ Adivasis are accepted as offences falling under the POA Act. A number of commonly committed offences (hurt, grievous hurt, intimidation, kidnapping etc.) were excluded from the Act. This loophole enabled the perpetrators of the atrocities to escape punishment. Therefore, a Schedule of list of IPC offences is provided in the amended Act.
- Establishment of Exclusive Special Courts and Special Public Prosecutors to exclusively try the offences falling under the Act to enable speedy and expeditious disposal of cases.
- Power of Exclusive Courts to take cognizance of offence and completion of trial in two months. Courts so established or specified have the power to directly take cognizance of offences under this Act and the trial shall, as far as possible, be completed within a period of two months from the date of filing the charge sheet.
- Addition of chapter IVA, Section 15A on the 'Rights of Victims and Witnesses' and the duties and responsibilities of the State. They include the right to be treated fairly and with respect, protection of victims, witnesses, informants, and their dependants against any kind of intimidation, coercion, inducement, violence, or threats of violence, timebound relief and rehabilitation, and the right to assistance from concerned individuals, organisations, and advocates.
- Defining clearly the term 'wilful negligence' of public servants at all levels, starting from the registration of complaint, and covering aspects of dereliction of duty under this Act.
- Addition of presumption to the offences – If the accused was acquainted with the victim or his family, the court will presume that the accused was aware of the caste or tribal identity of the victim unless proved otherwise.

== Objectives ==
The basic objective and purpose of this more comprehensive legislation was enunciated when the Bill was introduced in the Lok Sabha:

Despite various measures to improve the socio-economic conditions of the SCs and STs, they remain vulnerable... They have in several brutal incidents, been deprived of their life and property... Because of the awareness created... through spread of education, etc., when they assert their rights and resist practices of untouchability against them or demand statutory minimum wages or refuse to do any bonded and forced labour, the vested interests try to cow them down and terrorise them. When the SCs and STs try to preserve their self-respect or honour of their women, they become irritants for the dominant and the mighty...

Under the circumstances, the existing laws like the Protection of Civil Rights Act 1955 and the normal provisions of the Indian Penal Code have been found to be inadequate to check and deter crimes against them committed by non-SCs and non-STs... It is considered necessary that not only the term 'atrocity' should be defined, but also stringent measures should be introduced to provide for higher punishment for committing such atrocities. It is also proposed to enjoin on the States and Union Territories to take specific preventive and punitive measures to protect SCs and STs from being victimized and, where atrocities are committed, to provide adequate relief and assistance to rehabilitate them.

The preamble of the Act states that it is

An Act to prevent the commission of offences of atrocities against the members of the Scheduled Castes and the Scheduled Tribes, to provide for Special Courts for the trial of such offences and for the relief and rehabilitation of the victims of such offences and for matters connected therewith or incidental thereto.

The objectives of the Act, therefore, very clearly emphasise the intention of the Indian state to deliver justice to the scheduled caste and scheduled tribe communities through affirmative action in order to enable them to live in society with dignity and self-esteem and without fear, violence or suppression from the dominant castes.

The Supreme Court of India too reiterated the significance and importance of the Act in 1995 and at periodic intervals.

On 25 October 2021, the Supreme Court bench consisting of Chief Justice N.V. Ramana, Justice J Surya Kant and Justice Hima Kohli held that

The SC/ST Act has been specifically enacted to deter acts of indignity, humiliation and harassment against members of Scheduled Castes and Scheduled Tribes. The Act is also a recognition of the depressing reality that despite undertaking several measures, the Scheduled Castes/Scheduled Tribes continue to be subjected to various atrocities at the hands of uppercastes. The Courts have to be mindful of the fact that the Act has been enacted keeping in view the express constitutional safeguards enumerated in Articles 15, 17 and 21 of the Constitution, with a twinfold objective of protecting the members of these vulnerable communities as well as to provide relief and rehabilitation to the victims of castebased atrocities.

== Salient features ==
The provisions of the Act and Rules can be divided into three different categories, covering a variety of issues related to atrocities against the scheduled communities and their position in society.

- The first contains provisions of criminal law. It establishes criminal liability for a number of specifically defined atrocities, and extends the scope of certain categories of penalizations given in the Indian Penal Code (IPC).
- The second contains provisions for relief and rehabilitation for victims of atrocities.
- The third contains provisions that establish special authorities for the implementation and monitoring of the Act.

The salient features of the Act as amended to date are given below. (Please note that the section and rule references used here are as of the 2016 amendment. They - especially subsections of Section 3(1) - have changed significantly from the original Act of 1989).

1. Creation of new types of offences not in the Indian Penal Code (IPC) or in the Protection of Civil Rights Act 1955 (PCRA).
2. Commission of offences only by specified persons (atrocities can be committed only by members of the non-SC and non-ST communities on members of the SC or ST communities. Crimes among or between the scheduled communities (STs and SCs) do not come under the purview of this Act).
3. Defines various types of atrocities against the scheduled communities (Section 3(1)(a) to 3(1)(zc) and 3(2)(i) to 3(2)(vii)).
4. Prescribes stringent punishment for such atrocities (Section 3(1)(a) to 3(1)(zc) and 3(2)(i) to 3(2)(vii)).
5. Enhanced punishment for some offences (Section 3(2)(i) to 3(2)(vii), 5).
6. Enhanced minimum punishment for public servants (Section 3(2)(vii)).
7. Punishment for neglect of duties by a public servant (Section 4).
8. Attachment and forfeiture of property (Section 7).
9. Externment of potential offenders (Section 10(1)).
10. Creation of Special Courts (Section 14).
11. Time-bound investigation: Chargesheeting within 60 days from registration of FIR (Rule 7(2)).
12. Time-bound trials: Within 60 days of chargesheeting (Section 14(2)).
13. Appointment of Special Public Prosecutors (Section 15).
14. Rights of victims and witnesses (Section 15A).
15. Empowers the government to impose collective fines (Section 16).
16. Cancellation of arms licences in the areas identified where an atrocity may take place or has taken place (Rule 3(iii)) and seize all illegal fire arms (Rule 3(iv)).
17. Grant arms licences to SCs and STs (Rule 3(v)).
18. Denial of anticipatory bail (Section 18).
19. Denial of probation to convict (Section 19).
20. Provides relief and rehabilitation for victims of atrocities or their legal heirs (Sections 15A(6), 15A(11), 17(3), and 21(2)(iii), Rules 11 and 12(4)).
21. Identification of atrocity prone areas (Section 17(1), 21(2)(vii), Rule 3(1)).
22. Setting up deterrents to prevent atrocities on the scheduled communities by others (Rule 3(i) to 3(xi)).
23. Setting up a mandatory, periodic monitoring system at different levels (Section 21(2)(v)):
  1. Sub-divisional level (Rule 17A).
  2. District level (Rule 3(xi), 4(2), 4(4), 17).
  3. State level (Rule 8(xi), 14, 16, 18).
  4. Union level (Section 21(2), 21(3), 21(4)). (All available annual reports placed on the table of each house of parliament by the union government under Section 21(4) are uploaded here.

Together, the Act and the Rules provide a framework for monitoring the state response to the atrocities against Scheduled Castes and Scheduled Tribes. According to the Act and Rules, there are to be monthly reports from the District Magistrates (Rule 4(4)), quarterly review meetings at the district level by the District Monitoring and Vigilance Committee (DVMC, Rule 17(3)) and reviews in January and July by a State Monitoring and Vigilance Committee (SVMC) chaired by the Chief Minister (Rule 16(2)). The performance of every Special Public Prosecutor (SPP) will also have to be reviewed by the Director of Public Prosecutions (DPP) every quarter (Rule 4(2)). Annual reports have to be sent to the union government by 31 March every year (Rule 18).

The Act and Rules are a potent mechanism and precision instruments that can be used in tandem with the Right To Information (RTI) Act 2005 to motivate the state to hold the mandatory meetings and enforce compliance. A Human Rights Defenders Monitoring Calendar has been developed from the Act and rules to help human rights defenders and others to clarify the functions and duties of the monitoring authorities (the SVMC and DVMC).

== 'Atrocity' ==
An atrocity is a crime against the Scheduled Castes (SCs) or the Scheduled Tribes (STs) in India listed in Section 3 of the Scheduled Castes and the Scheduled Tribes (Prevention of Atrocities) Act, 1989 as amended to date. The term 'atrocity' was not defined until this Act was passed by the Parliament in 1989.

In specific terms:

1. It is an offence punishable under sections 3(1) and 3(2) of the Act.
2. It denotes the quality of being shockingly cruel and inhumane, whereas the term 'crime' relates to an act punishable by law.
3. It implies any offence under the Indian Penal Code (IPC) committed against SCs by non-SC persons, or against STs by non-ST persons. Caste consideration as a motive is not necessary to make such an offence in case of atrocity.
4. It signifies crimes which have ingredients of infliction of suffering in one form or the other that should be included for reporting'. This is based on the assumption that 'where the victims of crime are members of Scheduled Castes and the offenders do not belong to Scheduled Castes caste considerations are really the root cause of the crime, even though caste considerations may not be the vivid and minimum motive for the crime.

Section 3 of the Act lists offences shattering the self-respect and esteem of the scheduled communities, denial of economic, democratic and social rights, discrimination, exploitation and abuse of the legal process, etc.

It contains:

- Offences in their own right (Section 3(1) contains 30 subsections with an equal number of offences. Section 3(2) contains four subsections with offences)
- Two derived offences (sections 3(2)(vi) and 3(2)(vii)). The derived offences only come into the picture when another offence under the Act has been committed.
- One subsection (Section 3(2)(v)) increases the punishment for certain offences under the Indian Penal Code (IPC).

These protections can be broadly divided into protection from

- Social disabilities (denial of access to certain places and to use customary passage and to get water from any spring, reservoir or any other source).
- Personal harm (forceful drinking or eating of inedible or obnoxious substance, against stripping, outrage of modesty, sexual exploitation, injury, or annoyance).
- Property denial or destruction (land, residential premises, existing property).
- Malicious prosecution.
- Political disabilities.
- Economic exploitation.

The common denominator of the offences is that criminal liability can only be established if the offence is committed by a person who is not a member of a Scheduled Caste or a Scheduled Tribe against a person who belongs to a Scheduled Caste or a Scheduled Tribe.

== Investigation ==
The Act and Rules are very precise about the sequence, the procedure, and the officials responsible at every stage of the investigation.

Step 0 Information: All information received from any source (an informant) that an atrocity may be or may have been committed is recorded under Rule 5. As per Section 18A, an FIR must be registered immediately. No preliminary inquiry is required.

Step 1 Inquiry: When information is received (Rule 5), an officer not below the rank of deputy superintendent of police (DSP) or subdivisional magistrate (SDM) must visit the spot and conduct a preliminary inquiry (Rule 6(1)) and identify the perpetrators, the victims, and the extent of damage and prepare a report (Rule 6(2)).

Step 2 Inspection: On confirmation that an atrocity has taken place by the DSP or SDM (Rule 6), both the superintendent of police (SP) and the district magistrate must visit the spot and conduct an inspection to access the loss of life and property, and identify the victims and their dependents entitled to relief. (Rule 12(1)).

Step 3 FIR: After the spot investigation, the SP will ensure that the FIR is filed (Rule 12(2)) invoking the correct sections.

Step 4 Appointment of investigating officer (IO): The SP will appoint an investigation officer (not below the rank of DSP) to continue the investigation (Rule 12(3)). According to Rule 7(1) investigation of an offence committed under the Act cannot be investigated by an officer below the rank of Deputy Superintendent of Police (DSP).

Step 5 Investigation: The investigation officer (DSP) should complete the investigation on top priority within 60 days of the FIR being filed, and submit the report to the Superintendent of Police (Rule 7(2)).

If the investigation is not completed within 60 days, the DSP should file a written explanation (Rule 7(2A)).

The Superintendent of Police will immediately forward the report to the Director–General of Police or Commissioner of Police of the State Government (Rule 7(2)).

If the written explanation is not filed, the DSP is liable for prosecution under Section 4 for violation of Section 4(2)(e).

Step 6 Charge sheet: The officer– in–charge of the concerned police station shall file the charge–sheet in the Special Court or the Exclusive Special Court within a period of sixty days (the period is inclusive of investigation and filing of charge– sheet.)(Rule 7(2)).

Rule 7(1) is to ensure that the investigations are of high quality, and the assumption is that senior officials would not be as biased, nor as vulnerable to other pressures, as those in the lower rungs of the police force.

Various High Courts have set aside cases based on Rule 7(1). For instance, the Andhra Pradesh High Court, in D. Ramlinga Reddy v. State of AP, took the position that provisions of Rule 7 are mandatory and held that investigation under the SC/ST (Prevention of Atrocities) Act has to be carried out by only an officer not below the rank of DSP. An investigation carried out and charge sheet filed by an incompetent officer is more than likely to be quashed. Similarly, the Madras High Court in M. Kathiresam v. State of Tamil Nadu held that investigation conducted by an officer other than a DSP is improper and bad in law and proceedings based on such an investigation are required to be quashed. The Courts without taking into consideration the inadequacies of the State, have been punishing SC/STs (the victims) for the same. Shri Pravin Rashtrapal, Member of Parliament rightly pointed out that there are insufficient officers at that level. His statement is supported by the Annual Report of 2005-2006 of Ministry of Home Affairs. Of the total posts sanctioned by the government under Indian Police Service (IPS) more than 15 percent of the posts are vacant. This basically means that there is one IPS officer for 77,000 SC/STs.

In the case of Karnataka, there were no officers of the required rank in three districts, as admitted by the government at the State Vigilance and Monitoring Committee (SVMC) in September 2010. Though officers of higher rank can conduct the investigation (the Act only says 'at least of rank'), in practice they seldom do.

== Special Courts ==
For speedy trial, Section 14 of the Act provides for a Court of Session to be a Special Court to try offences under this Act in each district. Rule 13(i) mandates that the judge in a special court be sensitive with right aptitude and understanding of the problems of the scheduled communities.

However, that is seldom the case. Most states have declared a court as a 'special court'. The hitch is that they are designated courts (as opposed to exclusive special courts) and so have to hear many other cases too. Consequently, at any time about 80% of the cases are pending—defeating the very purpose of having special courts in the first place.

In 2019, despite the sizable and increasing pendency (see below), only 11 states have exclusive special courts (mandated for district with high pendency under Section 14). In total, were are just 194 exclusive special courts in the country. Andhra 1, Bihar 5, Gujarat 16, Himanchal 3, Karnataka 8, Madhya Pradesh 43, Maharashtra 3, Odisha 5, Rajasthan 31, Tamil Nadu 14, and Uttar Pradesh 65.

In 2021 the number of exclusive special courts dipped to 176 - Andhra 1, Bihar 14 (+9), Gujarat 16, Himanchal 0 (-3), Jharkhand 4 (+4), Karnataka 8, Madhya Pradesh 11 (-32), Maharashtra 3, Odisha 3 (-2), Punjab 3 (+3), Rajasthan 31, Tamil Nadu 17 (+3), and Uttar Pradesh 65 - despite the increase in pending cases.

Special Court Justice Ramaswamy observed in the case of State of Karnataka v. Ingale that more than seventy-five percent of the cases brought under the SC/ST Act end in acquittal at all levels. The situation has not improved much since 1992 according to the figures given by the 2002 Annual Report dealing with SC/ST Act (of the Ministry of Social Justice and Empowerment) Of the total cases filed in 2002 only 21.72% were disposed of, and, of those, a mere 2.31% ended in conviction. The number of acquittals is 6 times more than the number of convictions and more than 70 percent of the cases are still pending. By 2019, pendency in courts had risen to 147,545 (92.97%) for scheduled castes and 26,025 (90.72%) for scheduled tribes.

Inaugurating a two-day annual conference of State Ministers of Welfare/Social Justice, 8 Sept 2009, Prime Minister Singh expressed 'shock' that the conviction rate of cases of atrocities against the SC/STs is less than 30% against the average of 42% for all cognisable offences under the Indian Penal Code. In rape cases the conviction rate is just 2%.

In 2010, Karnataka has only eight Special courts, though 15 of 30 districts are declared 'atrocity prone'. Overall conviction rates remain at or below 5%. Even the few special courts seem to be biased. Of the 101 cases disposed of in the Tumkur special court, not one was convicted. Gulbarga, another atrocity prone district had a conviction rate of just 2%. 7 districts had a conviction rate of 0%.

The very first union report on the implementation of the Act, placed before parliament on 14 December 1993 notes that at the conference of the welfare ministers of Andhra Pradesh, Karnataka, Kerala, Tamil Nadu, and Pondicherry held at Thiruvananthapuram on 28 and 29 August 1992 the first main recommendation was that all atrocity cases should be decided by the courts in six months to one year. Thirty years on, in 2022, it remains a dream. The second main recommendation was that cases of acquittals and cases in which accused get minor punishment should be seriously examined. Thirty years later, no action is seen.

Considering that there are 254,475 pending cases (96.1% pendency rate) in the court for scheduled castes as of 31 December 2021, and 40,640 pending cases (95.4% pendency rate) for the scheduled tribes, this is a substantial loss in relief since 25% of the relief is linked to completion of the case. Even assuming the lower end of the scale of relief (which varies from ₹85,000 to ₹825,000) the monetary loss alone due to wholly avoidable judicial delays is in the range of ₹15 billion, US$200 million. As of 30 April 2022 at least one of these cases is in court since 1992 - i.e. 30 years.

== Relief, reimbursements, and socio-economic rehabilitation ==
Relief and socio-economic rehabilitation are dealt with under Section 15A Rights of Victims and Witnesses, Rule 12(4) Relief and Rehabilitation, and Rule 15(1) Contingency Plan (which deals with who is responsible and the time line).

=== Rationale ===
Atrocities often take place when persons belonging to the scheduled communities do not fulfill their 'caste functions' by doing ritually prescribed 'unclean' work or break the caste boundaries such as sitting in the bus or wearing a turban or footwear or sporting a mustache—often the preserve of the dominant castes. Atrocities are a form of 'collective' punishment for daring to have even some semblance of non-dependence which is termed as 'prosperous', and the atrocity is to bring them back into the situation of total dependence and servitude. The state therefore has the duty to help the community back on its feet.

As the minister for home affairs acknowledged:

In fact, a part of the reason why atrocities are committed is economic activity. In my experience, I have seen that in some areas, the Scheduled Caste or the Scheduled Tribe person is prosperous. My knowledge is mostly about the Scheduled Caste, not about the Scheduled Tribe. It is because of the economic activity, because of the enterprise, there are areas where the Scheduled Caste people have also become prosperous. The Scheduled Caste people are able to build brick and stone houses. The Scheduled Caste people are able to acquire vehicles. The Scheduled Caste people are able to dress better, send their children to better schools. One of the reasons why atrocities take place in those places is to cripple them economically. Every riot, every arson case cripples them economically. Therefore, it is important that the State must immediately rush in social and economic measures for the rehabilitation of those who have suffered through these atrocities.

=== Relief ===
There are three kinds of relief. Instant monetary relief Relief Emergency relief

==== Instant monetary relief ====
Instant monetary relief is in addition to the relief provided under Rule 12(4). It was additional relief of up to ₹500,000 is provided in the case of murder, rape, permanent disability, and arson by the Dr. Ambedkar National Relief to the SC/ST Victims of Atrocities Scheme (can also be found here) administered by the Ambedkar Foundation, an autonomous institution under the union government.

In January 2023 this scheme was discontinued by terming it a 'merger' with the centrally sponsored schemeresulting in the denial of over ₹1,140 crores to over 44,000 victims.

==== Relief ====
The Act has prescribed a schedule for relief and socioeconomic rehabilitation under Rule 12(4) as Annexure 1 entitled Norms for Relief Amount which ranges from ₹85,000 to ₹825,000 depending on the crime. This is periodically updated. As is often the case, the 'minimum' becomes the maximum. Relief is borne equally by the state and union governments i.e. 50% each.

In 2021, Tamil Nadu became the first state ever to increase the minimum amount to more than the guidance value in the rules with a range from ₹100,000 to ₹1,200,000 (the 'extra' amount is paid 100% by the state government funds as ex gratia).

The relief is paid in parts depending on the stage of the case. Generally it is 25% on registering the FIR, 50% on filing the chargesheet, and 25% on conviction. However, there are exceptions and variations. For most crimes involving women, the final 25% is on completion of the trial irrespective of the verdict. For acid attack it is 50% on registering the FIR and 50% on getting the medical report, and for disability or murder it is 50% on getting the medical certificate or post mortem report and 50% when the chargesheet is sent to court.

==== Emergency relief ====
Emergency relief is given for murder, rape, dacoity, and permanent disability.

It includes provision of utensils, rice, wheat, dals, pulses, etc., for a period of three months.

=== Reimbursement ===
The survivors are also entitled to dietary expenses, travel allowance and maintenance expenses, and full cost of medical care (including hospitalisation) at government cost when injured.

Attendants for those hospitalised, or for survivors and witnesses or their dependents who are children, women, or senior citizens, are also entitled to travel allowance and maintenance expenses for the duration.

Victims, witnesses, and their attendants are entitled to travel allowance, dietary expenses, and maintenance expenses during inquiry, investigation, and trial for visit the investigating officer or in–charge police station or hospital authorities or Superintendent of Police, Deputy Superintendent of Police or District Magistrate or any other officer concerned or the special courts.

These need to be paid immediately, or at the latest within three days (Rule 11).

=== Socio-economic rehabilitation ===
Socio-economic rehabilitation (including relocation if required) for the victim, the dependents, informants, or witnesses during investigation, inquiry, and trial is the responsibility of the Special Court or the Exclusive Special Court trying a case under this Act [Section 15A(6)].

In practice, administratively, it is often by the line departments of the government.

==== Individual ====
Individual rehabilitation is time-bound, and there is additional relief to victims of murder, death, massacre, rape, gang rape, permanent incapacitation, and dacoity. This is in addition to the cash relief and the relief provided by Ambedkar foundation (Rule 12(5)).

Rule 12(4) Schedule annexure-I Sr. No. 46 Additional relief to victims of murder death, massacre, rape, gang rape, permanent incapacitation and dacoity: In addition to relief amounts paid under above items, relief may be arranged within three months of date of atrocity as follows:-

a) Basic pension of ₹5,000 as applicable to a government servant with admissible dearness allowance (About ₹10,000 per month in 2022).

b) Employment to one member of the family of the deceased.

c) Provision of agricultural land.

d) House.

e) Full cost of the maintenance and residential education up to graduation level of the children of the victims.

f) Utensils, rice, wheat, dals, pulses, etc., for a period of three months.

==== Community ====
Common resources and services (such as wells and other water sources fouled, right of passage) are to be restored at government cost (Rule 12(4) Schedule annexure-I).

=== Helpdesk ===
The government has also set up a helpdesk to monitor implementation in 2021.

== Implementation record ==
Rule 8 Protection Cell and Rule 9 Nodal Officers: 23 States have set up SC/ST Protection Cells. Nodal Officers have been appointed in 28 States.

Rule 13(2) Special police stations have been set up only in five states - Bihar 40, Chhattisgarh 26, Jharkhand 22, Keralam 3, and Madhya Pradesh 51 (total 142) (Annual Report under Section 21(4) for the calendar year 2019). The pendency of cases in courts is increasing every year - from 174,931 in 2018 to 193,149 in 2019 to 223,017 in 2020, though the cases are supposed to be disposed off within two months of registering the FIR and there are supposed to be special courts and exclusive special courts for speedy disposal of cases. (Reply to question AU4152 in Parliament (lok sabha) on 29 March 2022).

Rule 15(1) Contingency plan: As of 20 May 2024, only five states are compliant with the Rules as amended to date - Tamil Nadu, Rajasthan, Karnataka, Haryana, and Bihar.

Though 11 states (Bihar, Chhattisgarh, Goa, Gujarat, Haryana, Himachal Pradesh, Karnataka, Madhya Pradesh, Odisha, Punjab, and Tamil Nadu) were reported to have prepared the mandatory contingency plan under Rule 15(1) as prescribed in Section 15A. (Reply to question AU1012 in parliament (lok sabha) on 8 February 2022), a 2023 Citizens' audit of the union report u/s 21(4) for the calendar year 2021 found that only four states (Tamil Nadu, Karnataka, Haryana, and Bihar) report updated contingency plans to bring them in line with the Amendment Rules 2016. Himachal Pradesh (2012) updated only the travel allowance and maintenance expense (enhancing it only for officials, but not for the victims, families, or attendants) on 12 March 2018. Uttarakhand (2016), Punjab (2010), and Gujarat (1998) report earlier notifications.

Subsequently, Rajasthan notified its contingency plan effective 19 February 2024, becoming the second state (after Karnataka) to notify a contingency plan due to litigation by concerned citizens and civil society organisations.

The 2023 Citizens' Audit also finds that Sikkim, Maharashtra, and Madhya Pradesh report contingency plans, but without the notification details. Eighteen states (Andhra Pradesh, Arunachal Pradesh, Assam, Chhattisgarh, Goa, Jharkhand, Kerala, Maharashtra, Manipur, Meghalaya, Mizoram, Nagaland, Odisha, Rajasthan, Telangana, Tripura, Uttar Pradesh, and West Bengal) do not report having contingency plans in their state annual reports for the calendar year 2021.

The union territories probably follow the union guidelines, though only Delhi says so explicitly. The union guidelines are not enclosed with their state annual reports for the calendar year 2021.

Uttar Pradesh, which tops the number of registered cases under this Act does not have a contingency plan yet. Though they are among the top 12 in recorded crime against the scheduled castes (Uttar Pradesh), scheduled tribes (Chhattisgarh, Kerala, and Jharkhand), or both (Telangana, Rajasthan, Odisha, Maharashtra, and Andhra Pradesh), nine critical states do not have contingency plans.

Not one contingency plan has ‘mandatory compensation’ [Rule 15(1)(f)], probably conflating it with relief and deeming relief to be sufficient.

Tamil Nadu has prepared the contingency plan both in English and in Tamil.

Rule 16(2) State Vigilance and Monitoring Committee meetings: Despite being mandatory to conduct State Vigilance and Monitoring Committee (SVMC) meetings in January and July each year, 20 states did not conduct a single meeting in 2016, 2017, or 2018 - all pre-pandemic years. Assam conducted 1 (2018), Chhattisgarh 2 (2016=0, 2017=1, 2018=1), Gujarat 4 (0,1,3), Haryana 5 (1,2,2), Karnataka 2 (1,0,1), Kerala 1 (0,1,0), Maharashtra 1 (0,0,1), and West Bengal 4 (1,1,2). But for Puducherry (0,1,1) and Chandigarh (0,0,1), no union territory conducted a single meeting either. (Reply to question AS323 in Parliament (lok sabha) on 17 March 2020). Andhra has not constituted the SVMC ever since its bifurcation on 1 June 2014 (Annual Report under Section 21(4) for the calendar year 2019).

Section 21(1) and 21(2) of Act stipulates that the State Government shall take all such measures as may be necessary for its effective implementation. As 'police' and 'public order' are state subjects, primary responsibility for prevention of atrocities and maintenance of law and order rests with the State Governments. A responsive police administration has always been recognized as an essential requirement in any society that seeks to take care of its citizens. Such responsive administration is essential for prevention of atrocities likely to be inflicted upon the scheduled communities by unscrupulous elements from other communities.

However, despite the Act and Rules, the situation has not changed much. The incidence of recorded atrocities is increasing, and the implementation of the law leaves much to be desired as this statement of the Union Minister for Home Affairs shows:

"Madam, I must concede that the statistics do not reflect any decline in the atrocities. On the contrary, the information compiled by the Crime Records Bureau shows that the number of cases registered of atrocities against the Scheduled Castes and the Scheduled Tribes is, in fact, on the rise. I have the numbers from 2006 to 2008, subsequent years are being compiled. Take for example the case of the Scheduled Castes. The number of cases of atrocities against the Scheduled Castes registered in 2006 was 26,665. That itself is an understatement. Many of the cases are simply not registered. In 2007, it was 29,825 and in 2008 it was 33,365. So, this clearly shows the rise in trend.

I can make one or two deductions from this.

1. Firstly that there is no let up in the atrocities committed on the Scheduled Castes.
2. The other inference one can make is, perhaps, because of the pressure that is put on the State Governments by the Central Government, by public opinion and by NGOs, now the States are showing greater willingness to deal with the problem. Therefore, more cases are being registered.

[...]

We cannot be happy about the fact that approximately 33,000 cases are being registered as atrocities against Scheduled Castes in one year. What makes it even more disturbing is that while so many cases are registered, the conviction rate hovers around 30%. What makes it doubly painful is that there is rise in atrocities, but when you try to prosecute and convict, the conviction rate is only 30%. It was 28%, 31.4% and 32%. Not only are acquittals very high; pendency is about 80%.

[...]

I am afraid that the disposal of the cases is low; the rate of conviction is low. Therefore, it is fair to conclude that the feeling amongst the Scheduled Castes and the Schedule Tribes that all these laws and all these statements, all these pronouncements have really not brought any relief to them. That feeling is running high and I cannot but say that feeling is justified." (p143,144 of the printed text).

Though the Act and rules are stringent, it is not a deterrent, as the Minister for Home Affairs P Chidambaram admitted in the Lok Sabha, referring to the Central Committee monitoring the implementation of the Act:

A committee under the Chairmanship of the Minister of Social Justice was set up after the Act was passed. That Committee has met, so far, 10 times. The situation in 25 States and 4 Union Territories were reviewed. That committee has expressed that the most important areas of concern are the following five:

1. firstly, the high rate of acquittal;
2. secondly, the high rate of pendency of cases and very low rate of disposal;
3. thirdly, inadequate use of the preventive provisions of the Act, while the punitive provisions are invoked and FIR is registered, preventive provisions are rarely invoked;
4. fourthly, that the committees and other mechanisms provided in the Act have virtually not been put to use; and fifthly,
5. the Act itself may not be deterrent, perhaps it is not being as deterrent as we thought it could be.

== Misuse and bias ==
=== Misuse ===
For some, the low conviction rates are evidence of misuse of the Act by the SCs and STs to threaten and blackmail other communities. The acquittal rates are abnormally high, as acknowledged by the prime minister and home minister (quoted above). There is also a high rate of FIRs rejected as being 'false' by the police, with 10% of the total cases investigated in 2016 being closed as 'false'.

There has also been concern regarding misuse of the Act for settling of personal scores. 75% cases were found to be false in Madhya Pradesh in a survey. 81% cases under the Act were registered against persons from OBC section, 14% upper castes and 5 percent minorities sections. According to data available with Rajasthan police around 40% of cases filed under the Act are fake.

Justice Karnan, a High Court judge had used the provisions of this Act to pass orders against the then Chief Justice of India Jagdish Singh Khehar punishing him with 5 years rigorous imprisonment.

There has also been reports of a man committing suicide after being threatened with a case against him under the Act.

Vishnu Tiwari spent 20 years in prison after being falsely implicated in a case for rape, criminal intimidation and sexual exploitation of a woman from the Scheduled Castes, under the provisions of this act. He was exonerated of the charges by the Allahabad High Court in 2021.

=== Administrative bias ===
Perhaps the most important bias (re implementation of this Act) is that there is little done to prevent atrocities. Most of the reports are of what is done after an atrocity has been committed. Few states have preventive measures in place. The 'relief' provided is a pittance and the confidence of the community is seldom rebuilt.

While the legal text is explicit in seeking remedies, the implementation of the text appears to evade actual performance. Laws and legal processes are not self-executing; they depend on the administrative structure and the judiciary with the anticipation that the social attitudes are driven by notions of equity, social justice and fair play. However, the increasingly indifferent responses of those involved in the implementation of laws protecting the weak, the oppressed and the socially disadvantaged have persisted over the years and the system has failed to provide for self-correction. The problem is that the victims of atrocities suffer not only bodily and mental pain but also feelings of insecurity and social avoidance which is not present for the victims of other crimes. If the judge delegated to protect them shows indifference, it further aggravates their already vulnerable position.

=== Judicial bias ===
Going through the Indian judicial system is degrading for any Dalit because of the still existing biases of the court judges. One example is the conduct of an Allahabad High Court judge who had his chambers "purified" with water from the 'ganga jal' because a Dalit judge had previously sat in that chamber before him.

Another example is the case of State of Karnataka v. Ingale. The State of Karnataka had charged five individuals with violating the Act. At trial, four witnesses testified that the defendants had threatened Dalits with a gun to stop them from taking water from a well. The defendants told the Dalits that they had no right to take water, because they were 'untouchables'. The trial judge convicted all of the defendants. On appeal, the Additional Sessions judge confirmed the conviction of three defendants but acquitted two. On further appeal to the High Court, the judge acquitted all the defendants after rejecting testimony of the four Dalit witnesses. The Dalits finally got relief from the Supreme Court. The High Court's reluctance to believe the Dalits was a "patent error," according to Justice Ramaswamy.

The issue of false cases and misuse of the Act found its way into the March 2018 decision of a two judge bench of Justices UU Lalit and AK Goel of the Supreme Court of India in Subhash Kashinath Mahajan v. State of Maharashtra & Anr. In addition to questioning Section 18 of the Act, which prohibits grant of anticipatory bail for offences committed under the Act, the court laid down guidelines, substantially diluting the provisions of the Act. The court granted additional powers to the investigating officer to conduct a preliminary inquiry before lodging a complaint. Further, written permission of the appointing authority for all public officials and of the District Superintendent of Police for other persons is required before a complaint is registered. - wilfully ignorant of the fact that all FIRs under this Act can only be filed after the District Magistrate and the Superintendent of Police visit the spot and conduct a preliminary enquiry (Rule 12(1)), and only then can the Superintendent of Police order an FIR to be filed (Rule 12(2)). Further, it also ignored the fact 'that the charges in this regard against the public servant shall be booked on the recommendation of an administrative enquiry (Section 4(2)) - so the question of not conducting a preliminary inquiry does not arise. In fact, the law was clear that the FIR can be filed only after a spot visit and inquiry has been done by the senior-most police official in the district (in the case of civilians) [Rule 12(2)] and only after an administrative enquiry (in the case of public servants)[Section 4(2)].

== Criticism ==
According to National Crime Records Bureau data total no of crimes committed in the year 2023 were 6241569 out of which Dalit victims were 57789 in number (0.9%). Total no of murders committed were 27721 out of which Dalit victims were 908 (3.3%). Total no of POCSO cases were 40423 out of which Dalit victims were 1407 (3.5%). The percentages were very less compared to the Dalit population which is 16.6%. Despite having an elaborate law which contains strict guidelines starting from investigation till judgement including financial compensation for SC/ST citizens, no such law exists for protection of non-SC/ST citizens for similar caste based crimes.

- Vishnu Tiwari case is one of the most widely cited examples of wrongful conviction, structural judicial delay, and the misuse of special legislations in India. Vishnu Tiwari, a 23-year-old resident of Lalitpur, Uttar Pradesh, spent 20 years in prison for a false rape and Scheduled Caste and Scheduled Tribe (Prevention of Atrocities) Act (SC/ST Act)before being fully acquitted by the Allahabad High Court.
- In the Saran gang rape and murder case where a Rajput girl was gangraped and murdered by Dalits there were attempts for coverup by the police.
- In Bahraich when 3 Brahmin homeguards had to undergo caste-based abuse by an IAS officer even a thorough enquiry was not conducted. Harassment under the act has also forced people to commit suicide. Even children as young as 9 years age have been framed under the act. The act has been used to frame entire villages including people not involved in the dispute. Even the financial help obtained under this act is used as monetary gain by some people.

== Empowering provisions ==
=== Rights of victims and witnesses ===
This is the first law in India to detail the rights of victims and witnesses [Chapter IVA, Section 15A]. It is the duty of the state to ensure these rights [Section 15A(1)]. The rights are comprehensive - from the right to be treated with fairness, respect and dignity and with due regard to any special need that arises because of the victim's age or gender or educational disadvantage or poverty [Section 15A(2)], to protection, to the right to be assisted at all times by a concerned individual, organisation, and an advocate [Section 15A(12)].

=== Relief and Rehabilitation ===
Relief and socio-economic rehabilitation is a duty of the government, and independent of recovery of the amount from the perpetrator [Section 15A, Rule 11, Rule 12(4), and Rule 12(4) Annexe Schedule I].

=== Legal aid ===
Legal aid is available for all victims, dependents, and their families, regardless of financial status. This includes state payment for a private advocate of choice, who will be paid more than the panel advocate and the special public prosecutor [Rule 4(5)].

Normally, legal aid depends on the financial status, in India.

== Civil society response ==
=== Monitoring implementation ===
Many civil society organisations (CSOs) started using this Act to provide some relief to the victims almost immediately. The full monitoring of the Act by civil society is a later phenomenon.

The full monitoring of the Act is virtually a 'systems audit' that, in addition to the police and judicial process, includes the monthly, quarterly, half-yearly, and annual reports; compliance regarding prevention, rehabilitation, performance reviews, quarterly subdivisional (SdVMC) and district vigilance and monitoring committee (DVMC) meetings, and half yearly state vigilance and monitoring committee (SVMC) meetings.

Comprehensive tools were developed to monitor the implementation of the Act for each case, and at the district and state levels. A few Dalit and human rights organisations took to monitoring violence against the scheduled communities, documenting them, publicising them and also monitoring the use of the Act in dealing with these crimes. One of the first to monitor the implementation of this Act was Sakshi Human Rights Watch Andhra Pradesh (Sakshi-AP), under the leadership of Nanda Gopal Vudayagiri from 1998 itself, in (undivided) Andhra Pradesh (present Telangana and Andhra Pradesh).

The first civil society audit of the union report under Section 21(4) and the state reports u/r 18 on the implementation of the Act were done for the calendar year 2021 and released on 14 October 2023.

At the state level, some organisations monitor the implementation of the Act and bring out reports and factsheets.

1. Karnataka: Monitoring by Committee Monitoring and Strengthening the POA in Karnataka (CMASK) led by the Karnataka Dalit Mahilla Vedike (KDMV). Annual reports by CMASK have been brought out for Karnataka since 2009 (in English and Kannada), (with monitoring tools), auditing the performance of the state, including the bureaucracy, judicial system, police and monitoring mechanisms (DVMCs and SVMC). Also available in Kannada is the monitoring calendar.
2. Tamil Nadu: Citizens vigilance and monitoring committees (CVMC) monitor the Act in Tamil Nadu since 2016 and bring out annual status reports and report cards in English and Tamil since 2018, and earlier by SASY. The reports are available in Tamil and English. A thirty-year scorecard in English and Tamil was released on the 30th anniversary of the Act on 11 September 2020.

However, recorded atrocities across the country continue to rise, and convictions still remain low, as the annual Crime In India reports of the National Crime Records Bureau show.

=== Website (cvmc.in) ===
As part of the monitoring by civil society, a dedicated website was launched on 11 September 2021 as the data repository by the Citizen's Vigilance and Monitoring Committee (CVMC).

In addition to the Act, Rules, and other information regarding additional relief in English, Hindi, Tamil, (and earlier versions in various other languages), it has the following information:

1. Annual reports of the Government of India [section 21(4)] since 1990.
2. State and Union Territory reports since 1990.
3. Tamil Nadu state annual reports from 2010 (the earlier ones are extracts from the union reports).
4. Citizen's reports for Karnataka from 2009.
5. Citizen's reports for Tamil Nadu since 2017.
6. Parliamentary questions (Lok Sabha and Rajya Sabha) related to the Act.
7. Judgements related to the Act from the Supreme Court of India.
8. Crime statistics related to the Act from the National Crime Records Bureau (NCRB).

It also has the tools and resources required for monitoring implementation at the

1. District level (Tamil).
2. Sub-divisional level (Tamil).
3. Individual cases (Tamil, English)
4. Ready reference (Kannada and English)

=== Filing PILs for implementation ===
Some organisations used Public Interest Litigation (PIL) to demand better implementation of the Act at the High Courts and in the Supreme Court of India.

In Tamil Nadu, petitions were filed for judicial orders to conduct the State Vigilance and Monitoring Committee (SVMC) meetings in 2013 and 2020. The government complied days before the verdict in both cases.

In Karnataka, the Citizens Committee Monitoring and Strengthening the SCs and STs (PoA) Act in Karnataka, (CMASK) sued for compliance (Writ Petition No. 7990/2020) in June 2020.

The National Campaign on Dalit Human Rights (NCDHR) had earlier filed for compliance in the Supreme Court of India.

=== National coalition for Strengthening SC&ST PoA Act ===
Just before the 20th anniversary of its enactment, CSOs came together from across the country to review its implementation and formed the National Coalition for Strengthening SC & ST Prevention of Atrocities Act. This coalition took stock of the implementation of the Act as of 2009 in a report card, analysed the lacunae and suggested a set of amendments for improving the implementation. State specific "fact sheets" were also made available for Madhya Pradesh and Bihar. This was followed up with a peoples reportcard in 2012.

Many important areas such as social and economic boycotts, causing hurt, destruction of property, defining the SC communities to include those who profess a religion other than Hinduism, Sikhism, Buddhism, and better monitoring mechanisms identified earlier in the K B Saxena study commissioned by the National Human Rights Commission, NHRC, were revisited and a campaign was launched that culminated in the ordinance of 2014. The campaign continued its momentum till the Amendment Act was passed in 2015, and then had a brief revival in 2018 from the Supreme Court Judgement in March till the Amendment Act in August.

== The Act, Rules, and Amendments ==
1. The Scheduled Castes and the Scheduled Tribes (Prevention of Atrocities) Act 1989 (The Bare Act, as amended up to 31 October 2019).
2. The Scheduled Castes and the Scheduled Tribes (Prevention of Atrocities) Rules 1995 (The Rules, as amended up to 27 June 2018).
3. Amendment Act, 2018, 20 August 2018.
4. Amendment Rules, 2018, 27 June 2018.
5. Amendment Rules, 2016 14 April 2016.
6. Amendment Act, 2015 26 January 2016. Incorporates the provisions of the Amendment Ordinance 2014.
7. Amendment Ordinance of 4 March 2014. A fairly comprehensive overhaul with new sections, chapters and schedules added.
8. Amendment Rules of 23 June 2014, amending rules and enhancing relief and rehabilitation.
9. Amendment Rules of 8 November 2013 Providing for subdivisional vigilance and monitoring committees and union government nominees at all levels.

== See also ==
- Vishnu Tiwari
- Paramakudi Riots
- Ambedkar controversial cartoon
- Karnataka Scheduled Castes and Scheduled Tribes (Prohibition of Transfer of Certain Lands) Act, 1978
