= False accusation of rape =

Reporting of a rape where no rape has occurred

A false accusation of rape happens when a person states that they or another person have been raped when no rape has occurred. The issue is studied in criminal law, criminology, sociology, and public policy, with particular attention to evidentiary standards, reporting practices, and the legal handling of sexual assault allegations.

Despite many attempts to estimate the prevalence of false rape allegations, reliable evidence is scarce, and estimates vary widely across studies and remain contested. Many factors can cause prevalence estimates to be distorted, misleading, or biased.

== Causes ==
Causes of false accusations of rape fall into two broad categories: deliberate deception (lies) and non-deliberate errors (such as false memories, facilitated communication, or uncertainty about events). In stricter definitions—such as those used in academic research—only the former is typically classified or counted statistically as a false accusation of rape.

=== Deliberate deception ===
An accuser may have several motivations to falsely claim they have been raped. There is disagreement on how many different categories these may be put into. Kanin (1994) listed three: revenge, producing an alibi, and getting sympathy/attention. Newman (2017) listed four: revenge, producing an alibi, personal gain, and mental illness.

According to De Zutter et al. (2017), Kanin's list is "valid but insufficient to explain all the different motives of complainants" and presents eight categories of motives: material gain, alibi, revenge, sympathy, attention, disturbed mental state, relabeling, or regret.

According to Hines and Douglas (2017), 73% of men who've experienced partner-initiated violence reported that their partner threatened to make false accusations. This is compared to 3% for men in the general population.

=== Non-deliberate deception ===
==== False memories ====
There are several ways in which an alleged victim can accidentally come to believe that they have been raped by the person(s) they accuse. These include:

- Recovered-memory therapy: memories of sexual abuse "recovered" during therapy in the absence of any supporting evidence, based on the Freudian notion of "repression"
- The victim's confusion of the memory of the real rapist with the memory of someone else
- Memory conformity: memory can become contaminated when co-witnesses discuss their recollection of events

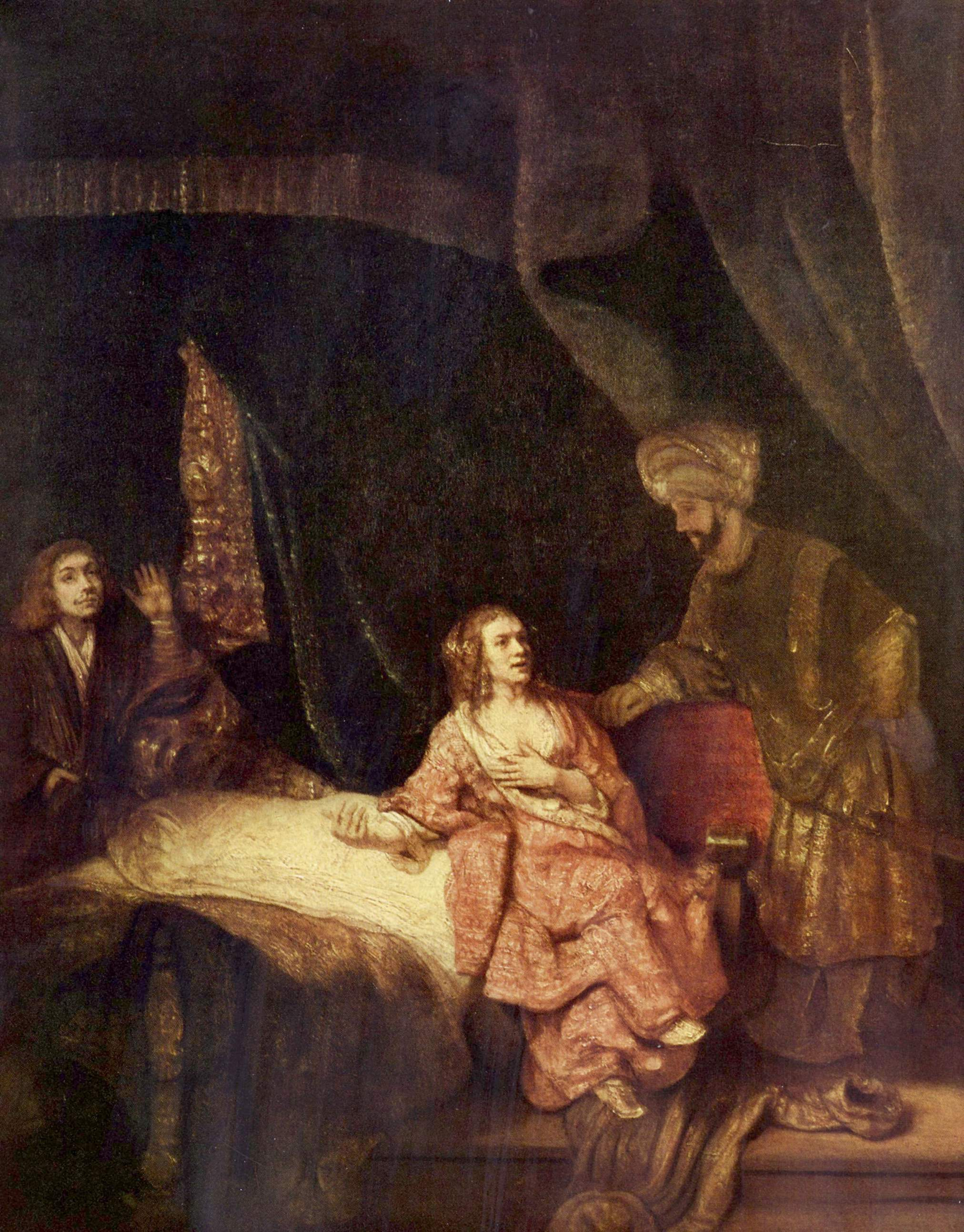
Joseph Accused by Potiphar's Wife by Rembrandt van Rijn, 1655

==== Facilitated communication ====
Facilitated communication (FC) is a scientifically discredited technique that attempts to aid communication by people with autism or other communication disabilities who are non-verbal. The facilitator guides the disabled person's arm or hand and attempts to help them type on a keyboard or other device. Research indicates that the facilitator is the source of the messages obtained through FC, not the disabled person. However, the facilitator may believe they are not the source of the messages due to the ideomotor effect, which is the same effect that guides a Ouija board. There have been a number of accusations of sexual abuse made through facilitated communication. As of 1995, there were sixty known cases, with an unknown numbers of others settled without reaching public visibility.

==== "Don't know" ====
According to De Zutter et al. (2017), 20% of complainants said that they did not know why they had filed a false allegation.

=== Presumption of guilt ===
Presumption of guilt refers to a tendency or practice in which, after a sexual assault or rape accusation arises, public opinion, institutions, or judicial practice assume that the accused has already committed the crime despite insufficient evidence or before investigation and trial are completed, and require the accused to prove their own innocence.

== Estimates of prevalence ==
It is difficult to assess the prevalence of false accusations.

Although understandable, assigning a percentage or range easily leads to misinterpretation. Researchers typically exercise great caution to avoid misleading and misuse.

Most jurisdictions lack a distinct category for false accusations. As a result, these cases are often grouped with other outcomes—such as cases lacking physical resistance or injury—under classifications like "unfounded" or "unproven". Because these categories include cases closed for multiple reasons unrelated to falsity, they cannot be used directly to measure false accusation rates. Reported rates therefore usually refer only to allegations proven false; some jurisdictions record only those demonstrating malicious intent.

Data on false allegations typically derive from reviews of investigative and prosecutorial records within criminal justice systems, rather than from studies designed to measure prevalence. These reviews aim to assess evidentiary sufficiency for prosecution, not to classify non-prosecuted cases as "false" or "true".

A widely cited study by Stephen DiCanio (1993) suggests that verified false rape allegations account for approximately "2% to 10%" of all cases. The prevalence rate is still unknown.

Frequently cited percentage estimates refer only to cases that, following investigation, were formally determined to be demonstrably false; therefore, they should not be interpreted as implying that the remaining reports are true. In fact, given the particular nature of this offense, the proportion of allegations that can be definitively verified or definitively disproven remains low.

=== Sampling survey targeting a broader population (2020, 2023, 2025) ===
The YouGov survey series on false accusations uses self-reported questionnaires administered via its online panel, with weighted samples of adults aged 18 and over. Respondents are asked whether they have ever been falsely accused of abuses.

- A 2020 U.S. survey (n = 2,407) found that about 8% of adults—roughly 20.4 million people—reported such experiences.
- A 2023 multinational survey (U.S. n = 1,266) reported a 10% prevalence in the United States, with broadly similar rates across countries including Argentina, Australia, Canada, India, Poland, Spain, and the United Kingdom.
- A 2025 multinational survey (Argentina n = 1,069; Australia n = 1,061; U.K. n = 2,081; U.S. n = 1,252) found the rate ranged from approximately 4% to 13%, with 11% in Argentina, 13% in Australia, 4% in the U.K., and 8% rate in the U.S.

=== Prevalence of false accusers in general population (2021) ===
In a 2021 study, 255 U.S. women (both college students and community members) were asked whether they could imagine a situation in which they would make a claim of assault to official investigators, or to friends and family members, against a man when it was not true. The results were that 101 (39.6%) of them rated this item positively to differing degrees and 18 (7.1%) admitted to making such false claims in the past.

Statistics Canada (2018)

According to Statistics Canada, 19% and 14% of sexual assault allegations were deemed unfounded in 2016 and 2017, respectively. It also declared, however, that more severe and violent cases of sexual assault were less likely to be declared unfounded than less severe ones. Cases declared to be unfounded are cases where police determined that the assault did not occur and was not attempted.

According to the Globe and Mail, the statistics about unfounded cases are often kept secret, providing no incentive for police forces to analyze and account for them.

=== Archives of Sexual Behavior (2016) ===
Claire E. Ferguson and John M. Malouff conducted a meta-analysis of confirmed false rape reporting rates in the Archives of Sexual Behavior in 2016, and found the rate of false reports of sexual assault was 5.2%. The authors say that the "total false reporting rate, including both confirmed and equivocal cases, would be greater than the 5% rate found here".

=== Los Angeles Police Department, USA (2014) ===
Researchers Cassia Spohn, Clair White and Katharine Tellis examined data provided by the Los Angeles Police Department in the US from 2008, and found that false reports among rape cases was about 4.5 percent. Upon review of Cassia Spohn's work, the Los Angeles District Attorney's Office (LADO), which initially collaborated in the report, concluded "the perspective, conclusions and policy recommendations are inconsistent with American constitutional principles of justice, due process protections and the ethical obligations of prosecutors." The LADO noted that Spohn et al. likely had ideological biases against the accused and "failed to develop an understanding of the criminal justice system in Los Angeles County."

=== Crown Prosecution Service report, UK (2011–2012) ===
A report by the Crown Prosecution Service (CPS) examined rape allegations in England and Wales over a 17-month period between January 2011 and May 2012. It showed that in 35 cases authorities prosecuted a person for making a false allegation, while they brought 5,651 prosecutions for rape. Keir Starmer, at the time head of the CPS, said that the "mere fact that someone did not pursue a complaint or retracted it, is not of itself evidence that it was false" and that it is a "misplaced belief" that false accusations of rape are commonplace. He added that the report also showed that a significant number of false allegations of rape (and domestic violence) "involved young, often vulnerable people. About half of the cases involved people aged 21 years old and under, and some involved people with mental health difficulties. In some cases, the person alleged to have made the false report had undoubtedly been the victim of some kind of offence, even if not the one that he or she had reported."

=== Lisak, USA (2010) ===
David Lisak's study, published in 2010 in Violence Against Women, classified as demonstrably false 8 out of the 136 (5.9%) reported rapes at an American university over a ten-year period (1998 to 2007). A much larger number of reports (44.9%) were classified by the authors as "Case Did Not Proceed.

Applying International Association of Chiefs of Police (IACP) guidelines, a case was classified as a false report if there was evidence that a thorough investigation was pursued and that the investigation had yielded evidence that the reported sexual assault had in fact not occurred. A thorough investigation would involve, potentially, multiple interviews of the alleged perpetrator, the victim, and other witnesses, and where applicable, the collection of other forensic evidence (e.g., medical records, security camera records). For example, if key elements of a victim's account of an assault were internally inconsistent and directly contradicted by multiple witnesses and if the victim then altered those key elements of his or her account, investigators might conclude that the report was false. That conclusion would have been based not on a single interview, or on intuitions about the credibility of the victim, but on a "preponderance of evidence gathered over the course of a thorough investigation."

=== Burman, Lovett & Kelly, Europe (2009) ===
In a study of the first 100 rape reports after April 1, 2004, in Scotland, researchers found that about 4% of reports were designated by police to be false.

A separate report by the same researchers that year which studied primary data from several countries in Europe, including Austria, Belgium, England, France, Germany, Greece, Hungary, Ireland, Portugal, Scotland, Sweden, and Wales, found the average proportion of reports designated by police as false was about 4%, and wasn't higher than 9% in any country they studied. They noted that cases where the police doubt the allegation may be "hidden in the 'no evidence of sexual assault' category" rather than listed in the "designated false" category and suggested more detailed research into explicating both categories.

=== Ministry of Justice, UK (2008–2009) ===
The UK Ministry of Justice in their Research Series published a report describing the analysis of 1,149 case files of violent crimes recorded April 2008 to March 2009. They noted that 12% of rape allegations fell into a broader definition of false accusations (victim was intoxicated, there was a delay in reporting the crime, victim retracted the complaint after the fact, or no evidence of bodily harm was recorded). Approximately 3% of the rape allegations were identified as malicious (determined to be intentionally false). When it came to cases with grievous bodily harm (GBH), even the broader definition (no evidence, delayed report, retraction, or intoxicated victim) accounted for only 2% of crimes.

=== Rumney, US, New Zealand, UK (2006) ===
A selection of findings on the prevalence of false rape allegations. Data from Rumney (2006)
Source	Number	False reporting rate (%)	Rumney considers dubious	Discussed below
Kelly et al. (2005)	67 out of 2,643	3% ("possible" and "probable" false allegations); 22% (recorded by police as "no-crime")	Yes	Yes
Jordan (2004)	68 out of 164; 62 out of 164	41% ("false" claims); 38% (viewed by police as "possibly true/possibly false")	Yes	Yes
Lea et al. (2003)	42 out of 379	11%	Yes	
HMCPSI/HMIC (2002)	164 out of 1,379	11.8%	Yes	
Harris and Grace (1999)	53 out of 483; 123 out of 483	10.9% ("false/malicious" claims); 25% (recorded by police as "no-crime")	Yes	
U.S. Department of Justice (FBI) (1997)	n/a	8%	Yes	Yes
Gregory and Lees (1996)	49 out of 109	45%		
Kanin (1994)	45 out of 109	41%	Yes	Yes
Grace et al. (1992)	80 out of 335	24%		
Smith (1989)	17 out of 447	3.8%	Yes	
Theilade and Thomsen (1986)	1 out of 56; 4 out of 39	1.5% (minimum); 10% (maximum)		
Chambers and Millar (1983)	44 out of 196	22.4%		
Stewart (1981)	16 out of 18	90%	Yes	
Maclean (1979)	16 out of 34	47%	Yes	
McCahill et al. (1979)	218 out of 1,198	18.2%		
Geis (1978)	n/a	3–31% (estimates given by police surgeons)		
Clark and Lewis (1977)	12 out of 116	10.3%		
New York Rape Squad (1974)	n/a	2%		
Hursch and Selkin (1974)	10 out of 545	2%		
Philadelphia police study (1968)	74 out of 370	20%		

A 2006 paper by Philip N.S. Rumney in the Cambridge Law Journal offers a review of studies of false reporting in the US, New Zealand and the UK. Rumney draws two conclusions from his review of literature:

- The police continue to misapply the "no-crime" or "unfounded" criteria. Studies by Kelly et al. (2005), Lea et al. (2003), HMCPSI/HMIC (2002), Harris and Grace (1999), Smith (1989), and others found that police decisions to apply the label "no-crime" were frequently dubious and based entirely on the officer's personal judgment. Rumney notes that some officers seem to "have fixed views and expectations about how genuine rape victims should react to their victimization". He adds that "qualitative research also suggests that some officers continue to exhibit an unjustified scepticism of rape complainants, while others interpret such things as lack of evidence or complaint withdrawal as 'proof' of a false allegation".
- It is impossible to "discern with any degree of certainty the actual rate of false allegations" because many of the studies of false allegations have adopted unreliable or untested research methodologies. He argues, for instance, that in addition to their small sample size, the studies by Maclean (1979) and Stewart (1981) used questionable criteria to judge an allegation to be false. MacLean deemed reports "false" if, for instance, the victim did not appear "dishevelled" and Stewart, in one instance, considered a case disproved, stating that "it was totally impossible to have removed her extremely tight undergarments from her extremely large body against her will".

==== Criticism ====
American psychologist David Lisak criticized the collection of studies used in Rumney's 2006 paper, which estimated the rate of false allegations as between 1.5 and 90%. Lisak stated that upon investigation many of the statistics are misleading and "when the sources of these estimates are examined carefully it is clear that only a fraction of the reports represent credible studies and that these credible studies indicate far less variability in false reporting rates." Lisak points out that even in the original paper, Rumney concludes that many of the studies have inadequacies and should not be used to estimate the frequency of false rape reports.

=== Police in Victoria, Australia (2006) ===
A study of 850 rape accusations made to police in Victoria, Australia between 2000 and 2003 found that 2.1% were ultimately classified by police as false, with the complainants then charged or threatened with charges for filing a false police report.

=== Kelly, et al, Home Office study, UK (2005) ===
The Home Office on UK rape crime in 2005 released a study by Kelly, et al, that followed 2,643 sexual assault cases from initial reporting of a rape through to legal prosecutions. Of these cases, police classified 8% as false reports based on police judgement, and the rate was 2.5% when determined using official criteria for false reports. The researchers concluded that "one cannot take all police designations at face value" and that "[t]here is an over-estimation of the scale of false allegations by both police officers and prosecutors."

=== Jordan, New Zealand (2004) ===
Jan Jordan of the Victoria University of Wellington examined police files from 1997 on rape and sexual assault from Auckland, Wellington and Christchurch. Around 75% of the 164 police files concerned rape, the rest concerned sexual assault cases without penile penetration. Jordan separated cases into four main categories. First, in 34 cases (21%), the police considered the complaint to be genuine. Second, in 62 cases (38%), the police were unsure if the complaint was true or false. Third, in 55 cases (33%), the police considered the complaint to be false. Fourth, in 13 cases (8%), the complainant stated that their allegations were false. For the cases in this fourth category, 8 of these 13 cases (62%) had another party calling the police on the complainant's behalf, or another party pressuring the complainant to contact the police.

=== Kennedy and Witkowski, USA (2000) ===
The 1994 Kanin study was replicated by Daniel Kennedy and Michael Witkowski of the University of Detroit. They recorded data from the period of 1988 to 1997 in an unnamed suburb of around 100,000, situated close to Detroit, Michigan. The authors found 68 reports of forcible rape, of which in 22 cases (32%) the complainants admitted that their reports were false. Similar to the Kanin study, most of these false reports served as an alibi (15 out of 22, 68% of the false reports). Diverging from the Kanin study, revenge was rarely cited as a reason (1 out of 22, 5% of the false reports). The remaining cases were cited to attention-seeking (6 out of 22, 27% of false reports).

=== U.S. Department of Justice (FBI) statistics, USA (1995–1997) ===
In the US, FBI reports from 1995, 1996, and 1997 consistently put the number of "unfounded" forcible rape accusations around 8%. In contrast, the average rate of unfounded reports for all "index crimes" (murder, aggravated assault, forcible rape, robbery, arson, burglary, larceny-theft, and motor vehicle theft) tracked by the FBI is 2%. This estimate, however, does not appear in subsequent FBI reports. This estimate was criticised by academic Bruce Gross as almost meaningless as many jurisdictions from which FBI collects data use different definition of "unfounded", which, he wrote, includes cases where the victim did not physically fight off the suspect or the suspect did not use a weapon, and cases where the victim had a prior relationship to the suspect.

=== Kanin, USA (1994) ===
In 1994, Eugene J. Kanin of Purdue University investigated the incidences of false rape allegations made to the police in one small urban community in the Midwest United States (population 70,000) between 1978 and 1987. He states that unlike in many larger jurisdictions, this police department had the resources to "seriously record and pursue to closure all rape complaints, regardless of their merits". He further states each investigation "always involves a serious offer to polygraph the complainants and the suspects" and "the complainant must admit that no rape had occurred. She is the sole agent who can say that the rape charge is false".

The number of false rape allegations in the studied period was 45; this was 41% of the 109 total complaints filed in this period. The researchers verified, whenever possible, for all of the complainants who recanted their allegations, that their new account of the events matched the accused's version of events.

After reviewing the police files, Kanin categorized the false accusations into three broad motivations: alibis, revenge, and attention-seeking. These motivations were assigned prevalence of roughly 50%, 30%, and 20% respectively. This categorization was supported by the details of complainant recantations and other documentation of their cases.

Kanin also investigated the combined police records of two large Midwestern universities over a three-year period (1986–1988) and found that 50% of the reported forcible rapes were determined to be false accusations (32 of the total 64). No polygraphs were used, the investigations were the sole responsibility of a ranking female officer, and a rape charge was only counted as false under complainant recantation. In this sample, the motivations mentioned above were roughly evenly split between alibi and revenge, with only one case characterized as attention-seeking.

==== Criticism ====
Critics of Kanin's report include David Lisak, an associate professor of psychology and director of the Men's Sexual Trauma Research Project at the University of Massachusetts Boston. He states, "Kanin's 1994 article on false allegations is a provocative opinion piece, but it is not a scientific study of the issue of false reporting of rape. It certainly should never be used to assert a scientific foundation for the frequency of false allegations."

According to Lisak, Kanin's study lacked any kind of systematic methodology and did not independently define a false report, instead recording as false any report which the police department classified as false, whereas Kanin stated that the women filing the false allegations of rape had recanted. The department classified reports as false which the complainant later said were false, but Lisak points out that Kanin's study did not scrutinize the police's processes or employ independent checkers to protect results from bias.

Kanin, Lisak writes, took his data from a police department which used investigation procedures (polygraphs) that are discouraged by the U.S. Justice Department and denounced by the IACP. These procedures include the "serious offer", in this department, of polygraph testing of complainants, which is viewed as a tactic of intimidation that leads victims to avoid the justice process and which, Lisak says, is "based on the misperception that a significant percentage of sexual assault reports are false". The police department's "biases...were then echoed in Kanin's unchallenged reporting of their findings".

While also noting some of the same criticisms of Kanin, Rumney's 2006 metastudy of US and UK false rape allegation studies adds that "if, indeed, officers did abide by this policy then the 41% could, in fact, be an underestimate given the restrictive definition of false complaints offered by the police in this study. The reliability of these findings may be somewhat bolstered by the fact that the police appeared to record the details and circumstances of the fabrications." Rumney questions the reliability of Kanin's study stating that it "must be approached with caution". He argues that the study's most significant problem is Kanin's assumption "that police officers abided by departmental policy in only labeling as false those cases where the complainant admitted to fabrication. He does not consider that actual police practice, as other studies have shown, might have departed from guidelines."

Bruce Gross writes in the Forensic Examiner that Kanin's study is an example of the limitations of existing studies on false rape accusations. "Small sample sizes and non-representative samples preclude generalizability."

== Cases in South Korea ==
=== Background ===
In South Korea, false accusations of sexual crime are emerging as a serious issue. In particular, this has become a major issue on social media and South Korean online community sites.

South Korea's constitution clearly states the principle of presumption of innocence in criminal investigations. However, there is much criticism in South Korea that the principle of presumption of innocence is not properly observed in the investigation of sexual crimes.

In South Korea society, there is a tendency to consider false accusations, such as false accusations of sexual crime, as light crimes, and false accusation and perjury are often difficult to prove and are not established. Especially for celebrities, once they are falsely accused, even if their innocence is later proven, they suffer damage that is difficult to recover from, so this is exploited and leads to crimes such as blackmail. Moreover, the actual sentences handed down by courts for false accusations are often light punishments such as suspended sentences or fines. In fact, according to the South Korean police, the number of false reports from women is increasing because it is difficult to secure physical evidence for sexual crimes, making it difficult for investigative authorities to uncover the truth, and victims' statements are often the only evidence.

Because of this, there are many opinions in South Korea that oppose changing the elements of rape in the criminal law from "assault or intimidation" to "consent" – so called "Non-consensual adultery(비동의간음죄, Bidong-ui Ganeumjoe)" – on the grounds that it could be used for false accusation of rape. This is due to the controversy over investigative agencies' violation of the presumption of innocence, the problem of false accusations of sexual violence, and the overly lenient punishment for false accusations. Opponents express concern that anyone could be falsely accused of rape based solely on the testimony of a false accuser, and argue that such legal amendments could facilitate false accusations of sexual violence.

This paragraph also includes false accusations of sexual violence other than rape.

== Police handling of rape reports ==
Surveys of police and prosecutors indicate that law enforcement personnel vary widely in their assessments of the prevalence of false accusations. Some researchers interpret this variation as reflecting a tendency toward skepticism of accusers. In 2018, Lesley McMillan analyzed police perceptions of the likelihood of false reporting in rape cases. She found that police estimates ranged from 5% to 95%, while research based on confirmed cases places the proportion of fabricated reports at approximately 3% to 4%.

== Possible effects of media representation ==
There are studies about the extent which the media affects the public perception of false rape accusations. Incorrect assumptions about false rape allegations increases the likelihood that a person who reports rape will be blamed or disbelieved. Megan Sacks in Deviant Behavior says that the media perpetuates rape myths when reporting on sexual assaults. Rapes that are reported in news media are typically sensational and do not often correspond with the reality of most rapes. For example, the majority of sexual assaults are committed by someone the person knows as opposed to a stranger. Sacks says, the media also normalizes sexual violence in general, often blames the person who reported the assault, and commonly expresses sympathy for the alleged perpetrators instead of the victim. Laura Niemi, a postdoctoral psychology associate at Harvard University, speculated that mythologizing of rape could contribute to the idea that "no normal person" could rape. As a result, the people commonly had a difficult time believing someone they know or like is a rapist, and this could contribute to the idea that the person who reported the rape is at fault.

In the European Journal of Psychology Applied to Legal Context, André De Zutter and a team described how false rape allegations often resemble stories of rape portrayed in the media, which are not typical of most true incidents of rape. False stories tend to be quick and straightforward with few details or complex interactions, and usually involve only vaginal intercourse. Some behaviors associated with lying by juries is actually typical of true rapes, including kissing or a previous relationship with the rapist. True rape reports often include many details rarely seen in media or false rape reports, for example pseudo-intimate actions, detailed verbal interactions and an otherwise wide range of behaviors besides penile-vaginal intercourse.

=== Pressure to 'Believe Women' ===
In the latest acquittal of 5 Hockey Canada players in the 2018 world juniors trial, justice Maria Carroccia ruled that:

"Although the slogan quote -- believe the victim -- has become popularized... it has no place in a criminal trial. To approach a trial with the assumption that the complainant is telling the truth is the equivalent of imposing a presumption of guilt on the person accused of sexual assault and then placing the burden on him to prove his innocence."

== Legal consequences of false accusations ==
=== United Kingdom ===
Individuals suspected of making a false accusation of rape may be charged with the civil charge of "wasting police time" or the criminal charge of "perverting the course of justice". Over a five-year period ending in 2014, a total of 109 women were prosecuted for crimes related to making false accusations of rape. The report did not indicate the verdicts following prosecution. Another report identified 121 charging decisions involving allegations of false accusations of rape and an additional 11 false allegations of both domestic violence and rape between January 2011 and May 2012 and found of these cases, 35 were prosecuted based upon false accusations of rape. A further 3 were prosecuted based upon charges of false accusations of both rape and domestic abuse. The report did not indicate the verdicts following prosecution.

== Historical racism in the United States ==
=== Justification for lynchings ===
In 1895, Ida B. Wells published The Red Record which documented lynchings from 1892 and their causes. Of the 241 lynchings she documented, rape and murder were the two most common justifications for lynchings. Wells found that many victims of lynching had been falsely accused of rape or some other offense because they had engaged in economic competition with white-owned businesses. Subsequent analyses have confirmed Wells' argument that economic competition caused lynchings and found that lynchings increased during difficult economic times. In other cases, African American men had consensual sexual relationships with white women and were lynched after the relationships were discovered.

In Louisiana, rape was the second most common reason used between 1889 and 1896 to justify a lynching. In a survey done in the 1930s of a small town in Mississippi, 60 percent of respondents stated that lynching was an appropriate response to a case of rape and that it was necessary to maintain law and order and protect white women.

=== Jim Crow ===
There are several notable cases of violence after an accusation of rape during the Jim Crow era (1877-1964).

In the Tulsa race massacre of 1921, white mobs killed between 75 and 300 people, mostly black, and injured an additional 800 people. The massacre began over a false allegation that a 19-year-old black shoeshiner had attempted to rape a white 21-year-old elevator operator.

The Rosewood massacre of 1923 began after a white woman in nearby Sumner claimed that she had been physically assaulted by a black man from Rosewood. Although the woman only said she had been physically assaulted, rumors circulated that she was robbed and raped. An angry mob surrounded a house which was filled with black residents and a standoff ensued. The mob killed several people inside the house and two white people were killed outside it. This event attracted additional angry mobs which razed Rosewood to the ground. Black residents fled into the forest, and escaped in cars and on a train. At a minimum, eight black people and two white people were killed, but as many as 150 black residents may have been killed.

In 1931, a white woman and a 17-year-old white girl falsely accused the Scottsboro Boys, a group of nine African American boys and young men, of gang raping them on a train. They had boarded a train across state lines in hopes of finding work but they were stopped by police. One of the accusers was rumored to be "a common street prostitute of the lowest type" who had been overheard asking "negro men" about the size of their "private parts". She was reputed to be a heavy drinker. The accusers may have told the police that they were raped to divert police attention from themselves, as not only were they potentially at risk of being charged with prostitution by local authorities, the fact they were crossing state lines placed them at risk of being found guilty of violating the federal Mann Act (which prohibits interstate transport of "any woman or girl for the purpose of prostitution or debauchery, or for any other immoral purpose"). Many white southerners felt the women's race was more important than their status as prostitutes; in the words of one contemporary account "[she] might be a fallen woman, but by God she is a white woman." The mob that gathered to lynch the men was only dispersed when the sheriff threatened to personally kill the first person to walk past the jail door. The younger accuser, Ruby Bates, later recanted her accusations and she was pressured into making them by the other accuser, Victoria Price.

A song about the case from that era:

Messin' white women
Snake lyin' tale
Dat hang and burn
And jail wit' no bail

The case inspired a national movement to free the defendants. Eight of them were found guilty, but the case was appealed to the Alabama Supreme Court and then to the United States Supreme Court twice. In Powell v. Alabama the United States Supreme Court reversed the Alabama Supreme Court's decision because it found that the defendants had inadequate counsel. In Patterson v. Alabama the United States Supreme Court sent the case back to Alabama for retrial because the Alabama Supreme Court's jury pool had excluded African-Americans, a violation of the Equal Protection Clause of the Fourteenth Amendment. Five of the nine Scottsboro boys were ultimately found guilty and sentenced to prison. In 2013, Alabama's parole board voted to grant posthumous pardons to all of the Scottsboro Boys who had previously not been pardoned because their convictions had not been overturned.

=== Present-day reduction in wrongful rape convictions ===
A 2022 study found that due to the use of DNA profiling, wrongful rape convictions in the United States, especially of black men accused of raping white women, has dropped significantly, avoiding hundreds or thousands of wrongful convictions.

== Notable cases ==
Case	Category	Year of accusation	Country	Note
Anthony Broadwater	Accused	1982	U.S.	Falsely acccused by Alice Sebold, resulting in 16 years imprisonment and being registered as a sex offender record for the next 14 years. Was exonerated in November 2021 by the New York Supreme Court, after Timothy Mucciante, executive producer of the canceled film adaptation of Sebold's 1999 memoir, Lucky, which describes the false incident, found inconsistencies in her story and hired a private investigator to review the evidence against Broadwater.
Ben Feibleman	Accused	2016	U.S.	
Brian Banks	Accused	2002	U.S.	Banks's conviction was overturned by a judge after five years in prison after his accuser recanted her allegations.
Carl Beech	Accuser	2014	United Kingdom	Beech was later found to be a sex offender himself. He was sentenced to eighteen years in prison.
Duke lacrosse case	Accused	2006	U.S.	All charges against the accused were dropped before the trial. The accuser later admitted to fabricating the charges.
Eleanor de Freitas	Accuser	2013	United Kingdom	Died by suicide three days before her own trial for Perverting the Course of Public Justice.
Eleanor Williams	Accuser	2020	United Kingdom	Eleanor Williams was convicted and sentenced to 8 years in UK prison after falsely accusing 4 men of rape
Jack Burkman, Jacob Wohl	Accuser	2018–2020	U.S.	Far-right conspiracy theorists who framed various politicians of fictitious sexual assaults. These include Pete Buttigieg, Robert Mueller, and Anthony Fauci.
Jackie Coakley	Accuser	2014	U.S.	
Jennifer Wilbanks	Accuser	2005	U.S.	
Laura Kinrade	Accuser	2026	United Kingdom	Lauren Kinrade, age 35, from Sittingbourne, UK was convicted of perverting the course of justice and sentenced to 4 years in prison after she made 20 false police reports, including allegations of rape, against a 71 year old man.
Neil Hamilton	Accused	2001	United Kingdom	Nadine Milroy-Sloane was jailed for three years for falsely accusing Hamilton of raping her
Nora Wall and Pablo McCabe	Accused	1996	Republic of Ireland	Wall and McCabe's conviction for the rape of a 10-year-old girl eight years previously was quashed four days after their trial, and in 2005 the Court of Criminal Appeal ruled that their accuser had lied. Wall was the first woman in Irish history to be found guilty of rape.
Oliver Jovanovic	Accused	1996	U.S.	Jovanovic's 1998 conviction was overturned by the New York Appellate Court the year after the trial
Sarah-Jane Parkinson	Accuser	2014	Australia	Parkinson was sentenced to three years in prison for filing a false report
Scottsboro Boys	Accused	1931	U.S.	Five of the nine accused had the rape charges against them dropped after six years and eleven trials, and the other four were eventually pardoned, three posthumously. One of the accusers later recanted and said she was pressured into making the allegations by the other accuser.
Stacey Sharples	Accuser	2026	United Kingdom	Stacey Sharples was convicted and sentenced to 4½ years in UK after falsely accusing 10 men of rape
Tawana Brawley	Accuser	1987	U.S.	
Treva Throneberry	Accuser	1990s	U.S.	
Vishnu Tiwari	Accused	2000	India	Tiwari's 2001 conviction was overturned by the Allahabad High Court in 2021, after 20 years of imprisonment
Vitaly Zdorovetskiy	Accuser	2026	U.S.	In 2026, after being released from a prison in the Philippines, Russian Kick streamer Vitaly Zdorovetskiy falsely accused Akash Singhania, an Indian American resident of California, of being a child predator during a livestreamed "sting operation".

== See also ==
- Burden of proof (law)
- Centurion Ministries – advocacy
- False allegation of child sexual abuse
- Families Advocating for Campus Equality (FACE)
- Innocence Project – advocacy
- Phaedra (mythology) – a story of a false accusation of rape from Greek mythology
- Potiphar's wife – a story of a false accusation of rape from the Hebrew Bible
- Racial hoax
- Recovered memory therapy
- Satanic ritual abuse
