= Sarah Jane (disambiguation) =

Sarah Jane is a compound given name. It may also refer to:

- Sarah-Jane (singer) (born 1985), Swiss demotic singer with Indian roots
- Sarah Jane (keyboardist), American keyboardist and vocalist with the band The Upsidedown
- "Sarah Jane", a track on the 1973 album Dylan by Bob Dylan
