= Verification =

Verification or verify may refer to:

== General ==
- Verification and validation, in engineering or quality management systems, is the act of reviewing, inspecting or testing, in order to establish and document that a product, service or system meets regulatory or technical standards
  - Verification (spaceflight), in the space systems engineering area, covers the processes of qualification and acceptance
- Verification theory, philosophical theory relating the meaning of a statement to how it is verified
- Third-party verification, use of an independent organization to verify the identity of a customer
- Authentication, confirming the truth of an attribute claimed by an entity, such as an identity
- Forecast verification, verifying prognostic output from a numerical model
- Verifiability (science), a scientific principle
- Verification (audit), an auditing process

== Computing ==
- Punched card verification, a data entry step performed after keypunching on a separate, keyboard-equipped machine, such as the IBM 056 Verifier
- Verification and validation (software)
- Account verification, verifying that an account is owned by a real person or organization

=== Applications ===
- CAPTCHA, device to verify that a user of a website is human, to prevent automated abuse
- File verification, checking the formal correctness or integrity of a file
- Speech verification, checking of the correct speaking of given sentences
- VERIFY (DOS command)
- GOV.UK Verify, identity assurance system in the United Kingdom

=== Software development ===
- Formal verification, mathematical proof of the correctness of algorithms
- Intelligent verification, automatically adapts the testbench to changes in RTL
- Runtime verification, during execution
- Software verification, an overview of techniques for verifying software

=== Circuit development ===
- Hardware verification
- Functional verification of design of digital hardware
- Analog verification, applies to analog or mixed-signal hardware
- Physical verification, design of a circuit

== See also ==
- Validation (disambiguation)
- Verifiable computing
- Verification bias, a type of measurement bias
- Verified, a UN program against COVID-19-related misinformation
- Verifier (disambiguation)
- Measurement and verification
