= Verifier =

Verifier can refer to:

- A machine, such as the IBM 056, used in two pass verification
- The Verifier, a type of fuel gauge

== See also ==
- Verification (disambiguation)
