= Vishnu Tiwari case =

Wrongful conviction in India

Vishnu Tiwari is one of India's most prominent examples of wrongful conviction and severe judicial delay. Tiwari spent 20 years in prison for a false rape and Scheduled Caste and Scheduled Tribe (Prevention of Atrocities) Act (SC/ST Act) accusation before being acquitted by the Allahabad High Court.

== Background and Arrest ==
In September 2000,Vishnu Tiwari, then a 23-year-old man and resident of Silavan village in the Lalitpur district of Uttar Pradesh, was accused of raping a woman from his village. A First Information Report (FIR) was registered based on allegations that Tiwari had assaulted the woman while she was walking to her fields. Tiwari was arrested by the local police on September 16, 2000.

== Trial and conviction ==
In 2003, a Sessions Court in Lalitpur convicted Tiwari under Section 376 of the Indian Penal Code (Rape) and relevant sections of the Scheduled Castes and Scheduled Tribes (Prevention of Atrocities) Act, 1989. The trial court sentenced him to life Imprisonment.

== Imprisonment and judicial activity ==
Tiwari was incarcerated at the Agra Central Jail. He attempted to appeal his conviction, but his case suffered from extreme bureaucratic negligence.

An appeal filed from prison in 2005 remained categorized as "defective" for 16 years because of minor documentation errors and a lack of active follow-up by state-appointed legal counsel.

During his two decades of imprisonment, Tiwari’s family was socially ostracized by the villagers and his relatives, and his father, brother, and another close relative died. Due to financial ruin, his family was forced to sell their ancestral land.

== Acquittal ==
Allahabad High Court took up the long-delayed appeal and delivered its verdict on January 28, 2021. A division bench comprising Justices Kaushal Jayendra Thaker and Gautam Chowdhary completely set aside the conviction due to lack of evidence.

== Aftermath and legacy ==
Tiwari was finally released from jail in March 2021 at the age of 43. Following public outcry, the National Human Rights Commission (NHRC) intervened, demanding justice and accountability from the Uttar Pradesh government regarding prison reforms and compensation mechanisms for individuals wrongfully convicted.
