= Sarah Jane =

Sarah Jane, Sarah-Jane, Sara Jane, Sara-Jane or Sara-Jayne is a feminine given name, an English combination of the names Sara (disambiguation)/Sarah and Jane.

== People ==
- Sarah Jane Baker (born 1969), British transgender rights activist, convicted kidnapper and attempted murderer and author
- Sarah-Jane Barnes, British-Canadian geologist and professor
- Sarah-Jayne Blakemore (born 1974), British neuroscientist
- Sarah Jane Booth, birth name of Lauren Booth (born 1967), English broadcaster, journalist and activist
- Sarah Jane Brown, (born 1963), British campaigner and wife of Prime Minister Gordon Brown
- Sarah Jane Buckley (born 1968), English actress
- Sarah Jane Cion, American jazz musician and pianist
- Sarah-Jane Clarke, Australian fashion designer, one of the founders of Sass & Bide
- Sara Jane Crafts (1845–1930), American social reformer, author, lecturer and teacher
- Sarah-Jane Crawford, English television and radio presenter and actress
- Sarah‑Jane Curran (born 1984), Northern Irish lawn and indoor bowler
- Sarah-Jane Dawson, Australian medical researcher
- Sarah-Jane Dias (born 1982), Indian actress and 2007 Femina Miss India winner
- Sarah Jayne Dunn (born 1981), English actress
- Sarah Jane Woodson Early (1825–1907), American author, educator and temperance activist
- Sarah Jane Fernandez (born 1969), Filipino lawyer, academic and jurist
- Sarah Jane Ferridge (born 1977), birth name of Sarah Jezebel Deva, backing vocalist in Cradle of Filth, who has her own band, Angtoria
- Sarah-Jane Hutt (born 1964), English model, Miss United Kingdom and 1983 Miss World
- Sarah-Jane Honeywell (born 1974), English presenter for the CBeebies television channel
- Sarah-Jane Leslie, American philosophy professor and former dean of the Graduate School at Princeton University
- Sarah-Jane Lewis (born 1987), British soprano
- Sara Jane Lippincott (1823–1904), American writer, poet, correspondent, lecturer and newspaper founder
- Sarah-Jane Marsh, British deputy chief operating officer and national director of urgent and emergency care for NHS England
- Sarah Jane Mayfield, birth name of Jane Wyman (1917–2007), American actress and first wife of Ronald Reagan
- Sarah-Jane Mee (born 1979), British sports presenter Sky News
- Sarah Jane Moon, New Zealand-born British portrait painter
- Sarah Jane Morris (actress) (born 1977), American actress
- Sarah Jane Morris (singer) (born 1959), British jazz, rock and R&B singer-songwriter
- Sara Jane Olson, alias of Kathleen Ann Soliah (born 1947), American terrorist, a member of the Symbionese Liberation Army
- Sarah-Jane Potts (born 1976), British actress
- Sarah-Jane Redmond (fl. 2000s), British-Canadian actress
- Sarah Jane Robinson (1838–1906), Irish-born American serial killer
- Sara Jane Moore (born 1930), attempted assassin of President Gerald Ford
- Sarah Jane Rees (1839–1916), Welsh teacher, poet, editor, mariner and temperance campaigner
- Sara Jane Rhoads (1920–1993), American chemist
- Sarah Jane White, accuser in the 2014 Parkinson case, subsequently imprisoned for her false accusations
- Sarah-Jane Trinny Woodall (born 1963), British entrepreneur, founder of the cosmetics brand Trinny London

== Fictional characters ==
- Sarah-Jane Fletcher, in the soap opera EastEnders
- Sarah Jane Smith, in the television series Doctor Who and The Sarah Jane Adventures spin-off

== See also ==
- Sarajane Hoare (fl. 1980s–present), British-born magazine editor, fashion journalist and stylist
