= Parkinson case =

Criminal case

The Sarah Jane Parkinson case, involving Canberra resident Sarah Jane White (née Parkinson), was a 2014 legal situation in which an innocent party, Daniel Jones, was falsely accused of rape and acts of domestic abuse by Parkinson, his former fiancée, who had grown bored with him while having an affair with police officer Scott John White. Jones was arrested and jailed in 2014, while Parkinson and White lived in his house and eventually married. Owing to mounting evidence establishing Jones's innocence, he was released, and Parkinson was convicted for her false accusations. She served two years out of a three-year sentence, after which she legally changed her surname to White upon release.

== Background ==
Daniel Jones, an Australian prison guard, had dated Sarah Jane Parkinson, an airline employee, since 2011. According to Ian Jones, Daniel's father, "there's nothing I look back on and think, ‘Maybe I should have probed deeper’. There were a few little things but nothing where you'd go, ‘bloody hell, she's a nutbag!’" During this time, despite the couple's closeness and Parkinson moving into Jones's house, Parkinson switched jobs and was hired on at a local police station for clerical work, where she met Constable Scott John White and began dating him behind Jones's back.

Soon afterwards, Parkinson began making allegations that Jones was abusing her and obtained an Apprehended Violence Order (AVO), which Jones tried to contest. Upon doing this, Jones was warned that there were allegedly five New South Wales police witnesses who were ready to testify against him in court. Daniel's mother Michelle Jones, speaking on the case for the blog Mothers of Sons, recalled:

Daniel was agitated when he came home from that meeting. My husband, Ian, was angry. We sought legal advice. Daniel was advised by a solicitor not to contest the AVO. It was the first bad advice we received. We acted on this advice and that turned out to be a seriously bad mistake.

Daniel Jones was charged and kept on house arrest at his parents' residence in a granny flat due to Parkinson continuing to living in Jones's private residence, which White later moved into as well.

It was later revealed that Parkinson had made claims of being raped in the past, implicating an unnamed Turkish diplomat who had allegedly assaulted her, although there is no evidence of this incident ever taking place. The Jones family was aware of the allegation but had not dwelled on it.

== Rape accusation ==
Parkinson's allegations of multiple acts of domestic abuse were facilitated by apparent physical evidence of injuries, which were later revealed to be caused not by Daniel Jones, but by Parkinson herself, who had earlier been diagnosed with Brugada syndrome after multiple dizzy spells causing her to fall and injure herself. Her accusations escalated to acts of indecency, including a claim that Jones had pulled his pants down and urinated on her. The visual injuries, coupled with Parkinson's allegations, led to increased suspicion towards Jones and his extended family. With the help of Scott John White, Parkinson staged a crime scene by faking a head injury, undoing her pants and having intercourse with White, using a condom and leaving only the condom wrapper on the floor. According to Parkinson, Jones had pinned her down, hit her head against a retaining wall in their house, unwrapped a condom and proceeded to rape her before fleeing the scene. Daniel Jones was promptly arrested by police, and remanded to Australia's maximum-security Goulburn prison. Jones maintained his innocence, while his parents attempted to get him released, remortgaging their own property and spending roughly $300,000 in legal fees and trying to free their son.

Several months into the case, Detective Leesa Alexander, who had initially been working to aid Parkinson against Jones, discovered various inconsistencies in Parkinson's story and shifted her investigation from Jones to Parkinson. By this point, the Jones family had spent over $600,000 to try to prove Daniel Jones's innocence; this, along with the stress of the case, led Ian and Michelle Jones to divorce, although they remained close friends afterwards. As a former prison guard, Daniel Jones was subject to extremely harsh treatment in prison and contemplated suicide while awaiting his trial. Using a dated family photograph of Jones with his young nephew, as well as GPS data, it was established that Jones could not have possibly committed the crimes that Parkinson had accused him of, as he was not even physically within Parkinson's vicinity at the time of the alleged rape. The charges against him were dropped, and Daniel Jones was released from prison.

== Parkinson's conviction ==
After Daniel Jones's innocence was established, Parkinson was arrested, charged with filing a false report of a punishable crime, and was found guilty in 2015. Parkinson served two years of a three-year prison sentence, after which she was released on parole and married Scott John White, legally changing her own surname to "White" and residing on his property. Scott John White was later charged with perjury after being implicated as aiding in Parkinson's false accusations and staged rape. It was also argued that the empty condom wrapper discovered at the rape scene had in fact been White's condom, not Jones's.

== Cultural impact ==
Owing in part to the extreme nature of Parkinson's accusations, as well as police corruption and failure of the Australian legal system in its approach to the case, the Sarah Jane Parkinson case has become synonymous with the concept of false accusations in Australia, as well as with the limitations of the #MeToo movement. Michelle Jones, angry at the legal system's treatment of her son, helped to start an activist group called Mothers of Sons, intended to raise awareness of men and boys falsely accused of crimes against women. Mothers of Sons was accused of being an anti-feminist organization by Caitlin Roper of feminist group Collective Shout. Speaking on the matter, Roper stated that "this idea that men are disadvantaged in the legal system is not in line with reality." In response, Mothers of Sons pointed out the social harm to women created by false accusations against men, noting that false accusations are "ruining it for women who really need help."

The Parkinson case was extensively covered by 60 Minutes Australia, in which it was suggested that Parkinson had grown bored with Daniel Jones and had hoped to be given his house in the aftermath of his arrest. Parkinson herself has never stated this, although she continued to live in Jones's house with her then-boyfriend Scott John White after Jones was sent to jail.

== See also ==
- Kern County child abuse cases
- False accusation of rape
