= Analogue electronics =

Electronic systems with a continuously variable signal

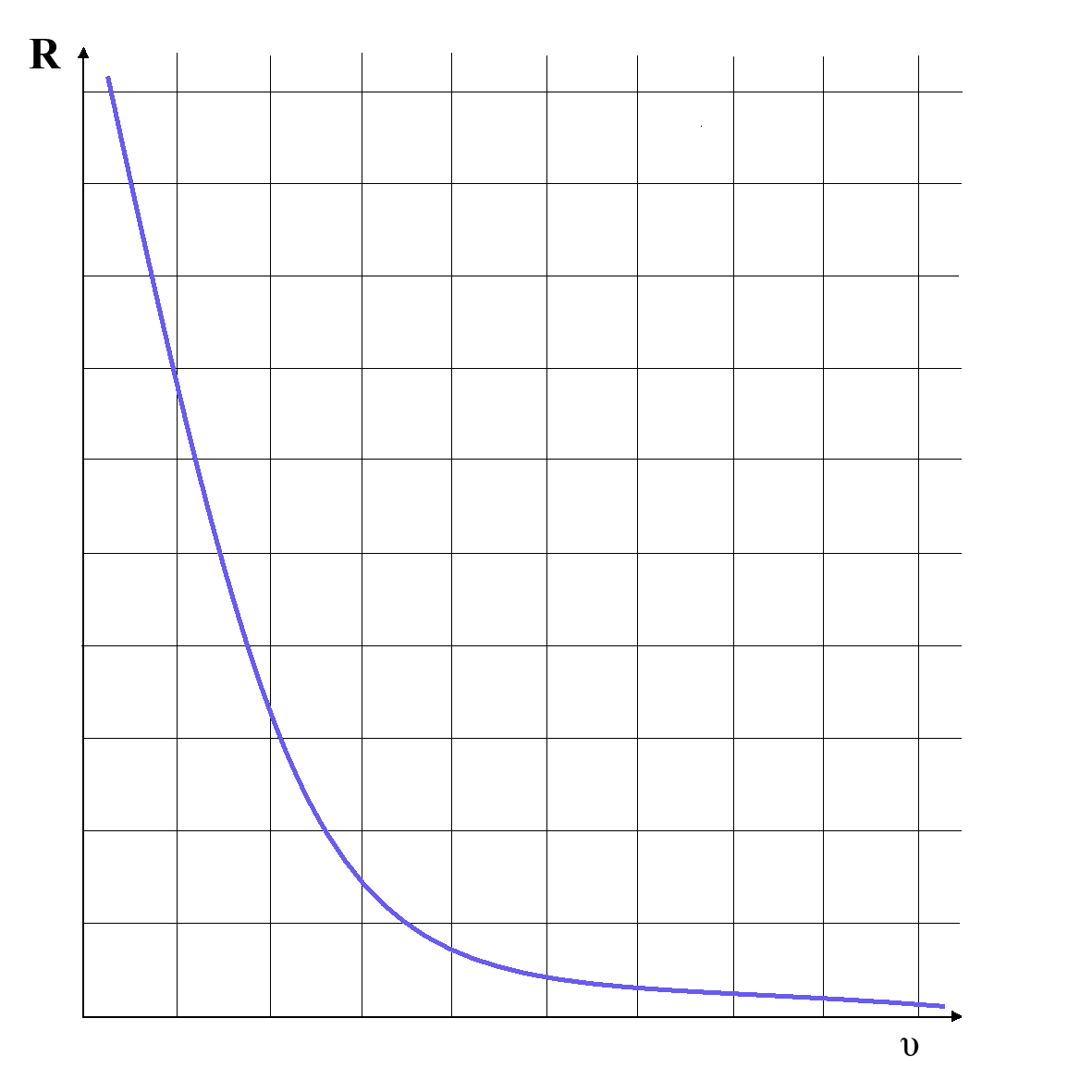
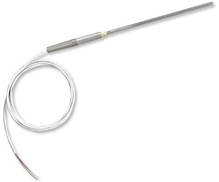
Analogue electronic components like this thermistor function with continuous signals, unlike digital electronics which have discrete signals, usually binary code

Analogue electronics (American English: analog electronics) are electronic systems with a continuously variable signal, in contrast to digital electronics where signals usually take only two levels. The term analogue describes the proportional relationship between a signal and a voltage or current that represents the signal. The word analogue is derived from the Greek word ανάλογος analogos meaning proportional.

== Analogue signals ==
An analogue signal uses some attribute of the medium to convey the signal's information. For example, an aneroid barometer uses the angular position of a needle on top of a contracting and expanding box as the signal to convey the information of changes in atmospheric pressure. Electrical signals may represent information by changing their voltage, current, frequency, or total charge. Information is converted from some other physical form (such as sound, light, temperature, pressure, position) to an electrical signal by a transducer which converts one type of energy into another (e.g. a microphone).

The signals take any value from a given range, and each unique signal value represents different information. Any change in the signal is meaningful, and each level of the signal represents a different level of the phenomenon that it represents. For example, suppose the signal is being used to represent temperature, with one volt representing one degree Celsius. In such a system, 10 volts would represent 10 degrees, and 10.1 volts would represent 10.1 degrees.

Another method of conveying an analogue signal is to use modulation. In this, some base carrier signal has one of its properties altered: amplitude modulation (AM) involves altering the amplitude of a sinusoidal voltage waveform by the source information, frequency modulation (FM) changes the frequency. Other techniques, such as phase modulation or changing the phase of the carrier signal, are also used.

In an analogue sound recording, the variation in pressure of a sound striking a microphone creates a corresponding variation in the current passing through it or voltage across it. An increase in the volume of the sound causes the fluctuation of the current or voltage to increase proportionally while keeping the same waveform or shape.

Mechanical, pneumatic, hydraulic, and other systems may also use analogue signals.

== Inherent noise ==
Analogue systems invariably include noise, random disturbances or variations, some caused by the random thermal vibrations of atomic particles. Since all variations of an analogue signal are significant, any disturbance is equivalent to a change in the original signal and so appears as noise. As the signal is copied and re-copied, or transmitted over long distances, these random variations become more significant and lead to signal degradation. Other sources of noise may include crosstalk from other signals or poorly designed components. These disturbances may be reduced by use of shielding and low-noise amplifiers.

== Analogue vs digital electronics ==
A digital signal like USB is inherently an analogue signal

Since the information is encoded differently in analogue and digital electronics, the way they process a signal is consequently different. All operations that can be performed on an analogue signal such as amplification, filtering, limiting, and others, can also be duplicated in the digital domain. Every digital circuit is also an analogue circuit, in that the behaviour of any digital circuit can be explained using the rules of analogue circuits.

The use of microelectronics has made digital devices cheap and widely available.

=== Noise ===
The effect of noise on an analogue circuit is a function of the level of noise. The greater the noise level, the more the analogue signal is disturbed, slowly becoming less usable. Because of this, analogue signals are said to "fail gracefully". Analogue signals can still contain intelligible information with very high levels of noise. Digital circuits, on the other hand, are not affected at all by the presence of noise until a certain threshold is reached, at which point they fail catastrophically. For digital telecommunications, it is possible to increase the noise threshold with the use of error detection and correction coding schemes and algorithms. Nevertheless, there is still a point at which catastrophic failure of the link occurs.

In digital electronics, because the information is quantized, as long as the signal stays inside a range of values, it represents the same information. In digital circuits the signal is regenerated at each logic gate, lessening or removing noise. In analogue circuits, signal loss can be regenerated with amplifiers. However, noise is cumulative throughout the system and the amplifier itself will add to the noise according to its noise figure.

=== Precision ===
A number of factors affect how precise a signal is, mainly the noise present in the original signal and the noise added by processing (see signal-to-noise ratio). Fundamental physical limits such as the shot noise in components limits the resolution of analogue signals. In digital electronics additional precision is obtained by using additional digits to represent the signal. The practical limit in the number of digits is determined by the performance of the analogue-to-digital converter (ADC), since digital operations can usually be performed without loss of precision. The ADC takes an analogue signal and changes it into a series of binary numbers. The ADC may be used in simple digital display devices, e. g., thermometers or light meters but it may also be used in digital sound recording and in data acquisition. However, a digital-to-analogue converter (DAC) is used to change a digital signal to an analogue signal. A DAC takes a series of binary numbers and converts it to an analogue signal. It is common to find a DAC in the gain-control system of an op-amp which in turn may be used to control digital amplifiers and filters.

=== Design difficulty ===
Analogue circuits are typically harder to design, requiring more skill than comparable digital systems to conceptualize. An analogue circuit is usually designed by hand because the application is built into the hardware. Digital hardware, on the other hand, has a great deal of commonality across applications and can be mass-produced in a standardised form. Hardware design consists largely of repeated identical blocks and the design process can be highly automated. This is one of the main reasons that digital systems have become more common than analogue devices. However, the application of digital hardware is a function of the software/firmware and creating this is still largely a labour-intensive process. Since the early 2000s, there were some platforms that were developed which enabled analogue design to be defined using software - which allows faster prototyping. Furthermore, if a digital electronic device is to interact with the real world, it will always need an analogue interface. For example, every digital radio receiver has an analogue preamplifier as the first stage in the receive chain.

Design of analogue circuits has been greatly eased by the advent of software circuit simulators such as SPICE. IBM developed their own in-house simulator, ASTAP, in the 1970s which used an unusual (compared to other simulators) sparse matrix method of circuit analysis.

== Circuit classification ==
Analogue circuits can be entirely passive, consisting of resistors, capacitors and inductors. Active circuits also contain active elements such as transistors. Traditional circuits are built from lumped elements – that is, discrete components. However, an alternative is distributed-element circuits, built from pieces of transmission line.

== See also ==
- Analogue computer
- Analogue verification
- Comparison of analogue and digital recording
- Digital data, in contrast to analogue
- Linear integrated circuit, an analogue chip
