= ASTAP =

Analog electronic circuit simulator

ASTAP (Advanced Statistical Analysis Program) was a general purpose analog electronic circuit simulator developed primarily for in-house use by IBM from 1973 on. It was a powerful program used for simulation of integrated circuit designs, and their analysis with statistical variations of the manufacturing process. In combination with the built-in Monte Carlo method capabilities it allowed prediction of the performance of electronic circuits under a wide range of material parameters and temperatures. ASTAP was designed to run on IBM Mainframe computers. Its algorithms were developed by IBM electrical engineers, especially Robert Brayton, Gary Hachtel, and Fred Gustavson.

Unlike SPICE, which used Modified nodal analysis (MNA) to form the system of circuit equations, ASTAP instead used sparse tableau approach (STA) to construct and solve a sparse matrix. The sparse tableau formulation produced very large, very sparse matrices which required special techniques to solve efficiently, even at that time. The advantage of STA for statistical analysis is that, as originally outlined, a subsequent analysis of a circuit with randomly varied parameters only required changing entries in the matrix.
