= The Verifier =

Proprietary fuel gauge technology

The Verifier refers to a proprietary fuel gauge technology, used for advanced measurement of heating oil in residential and commercial tanks ranging from 1,000 – 20,000 gallons. First developed in 2005, by U.S. Energy Group’s Jerry Pindus, Verifier technology was granted Patent Approval 11/095,914 as “The Verifier Digital Fuel Gauge” from The United States Patent and Trademark Office on September 21, 2007. The Verifier is also ETL SEMKO certified.

== Technology ==
The Verifier makes use of ultrasound technology, a method of using high-intensity acoustic energy which is above the limits of human hearing. Just as it has done for other fields, ultrasound technology offers unprecedented access and accuracy with The Verifier. The old system of measuring oil deliveries and inventory involves either climbing onto the tank and ‘sticking it’ with a ruler or pumping air into a petrometer and converting a pressure reading of the weight of the oil. These systems were developed when oil was inexpensive and when accuracy and convenience were not essential.

Verifier technology confirms an oil delivery within 1/10 of an inch, recording the exact date, time and amount of heating oil delivered to the tank and checking the amount of heating oil delivered. An ultrasonic ping is sent from the device to the heating oil, an echo is received back, and the Verifier’s complex, patented algorithm then figures the time between when the ping was sent and the echo received, compensating for oil temperature variations. The system is precise, safe, and clean.

The history of ultrasound technology began in 1794, when Italian Lazzaro Spallanzani (1729–1799) first noticed the phenomenon in nature. The human application of ultrasound technology developed remarkably in the last 100 years, and was influenced heavily by World War I and by World War II, in which Sonar, or sound navigation and ranging, was utilized. Following World War II, applications of ultrasound developed, transforming many industries.

== Theft detection ==
In October 2005, building owner Mike Laub, of The Realty Group, became the first person to use The Verifier to detect a heating oil theft in progress. The Verifier alerted his management company that the wrong quantity of oil had been delivered and later detected the driver trying to “undo the crime” by pouring hundreds of gallons into the building’s tank at 2 AM. Verifier technology is precise enough to double-check delivery truck tickets and meter readings.

In July 2007, major newspapers throughout the New York Metro area reported on the alleged theft of $75 million of heating oil by two oil transport companies in Brooklyn. This led to increased interest in The Verifier as a theft deterrent device.

== Inventory management ==
The Verifier is also used to monitor and measure the incremental use of oil, providing daily summaries and alerts for low oil levels. With local and Internet access to all of this information, building managers can follow certain inventory control regulations and avoid stiff fines. New York State Department of Environmental Conservation (DEC) has recommended “in-tank monitoring systems,” like The Verifier, stating that “electronic systems which automatically measure tank inventories and continuously record changes…supply all of the information needed to perform daily reconciliations.” These inventory records are also encouraged by major oil companies and the American Petroleum Institute. Moreover, accurate inventory measurement and tracking enables fuel consumption analysis to be performed and charted, by building, hourly, weekly and monthly; by square footage, by unit; and by degree-days. Additionally, consumption comparisons to prior periods, over specified times, and to other buildings in an entire database of portfolios can be performed as well.

== Environmental Impact ==
In recent years, the U.S. Green Building Council and numerous state, local and federal agencies and officials began a strategic campaign to decrease greenhouse gas and carbon emissions from commercial and residential buildings. For example, in New York City, the 950,000 commercial and residential buildings were responsible for 80% of the 58.3 million metric tons of greenhouse gases that the city emitted in 2005, and were responsible for 30% of the energy usage. In response to this statistic, Mayor Michael Bloomberg announced PlaNYC to help New York achieve his stated goal, the cleanest air quality of any major city in America.

The Verifier is part of the larger trend toward products that promote building sustainability and a reduction in carbon emissions. The inventory management features help owners and property managers track and utilize their fuel efficiently, detect leaks and heating system malfunctions and promote safe handling of oil.

== See also ==
- Ultrasound
- Heating oil
- New York State Department of Environmental Conservation
- American Petroleum Institute
- Sustainability
- PlaNYC
- Green Building
