= Saran gang rape and murder =

2026 crime in Bihar, India

On March 11, 2026, a 16-year-old girl was gang raped by 5 men and was dumped alive into a well in the village of Pattisheetal, Saran district, Bihar, India. Her rape and murder sparked widespread outrage on social media.

According to Neo Politico, the victim belonged to the Rajput caste, while the accused are Dalits. The victim was dragged into a bathroom where she was gang raped and then thrown into the well, after which the culprits fled the scene.

Police arrested one suspect Yuvraj Kumar, in relation to the incident. According to a testimony by the victim's mother, one of the accused had previously tried to sexually assault the victim and threatened to “kill everyone in the house.”
