= Ben Feibleman v. Columbia University =

Title IX case

Ben Feibleman v. Columbia University (2020), formally known as John Doe v. Columbia University, is a Title IX case that was brought to the United States District Court for the Southern District of New York on the basis of anti-male bias which discriminates against male students accused of sexual assault. Columbia University launched an investigation of a sexual assault that was reported by Jane Doe in which Columbia found Jane Doe to be more credible and revoked Feibleman's degree from the Graduate School of Journalism. Feibleman filed a lawsuit against Columbia University. A settlement for an undisclosed sum was made on December 23, 2020, which restored Feibleman's diploma.

== Allegations ==
On October 4, 2016, Ben Feibleman was accused of sexually assaulting a classmate after a journalism school reception at which both parties had been drinking. Jane Doe asked Feibleman to go with her to the water tower and then ended up in her bedroom; at that point, Feibleman started to record the encounter. Jane Doe can be heard asking Feibleman to engage in sexual intercourse which he declines and attempts to leave Jane Doe's apartment. When Feibleman tries to explain, Jane Doe states that she is confused and does not know what is going on. The following morning on October 5, 2016, Jane Doe filed a formal complaint. In the complaint Jane Doe states that she went to sleep, woke up, and realized another student was sexually assaulting her. Feibleman alleges that Jane Doe sexually assaulted him and made a counter complaint.

== Investigation ==
Feibleman claims that Columbia University failed to provide him with a fair process. Columbia University's Gender-Based Misconduct Policy (GBMP) states that it fosters an environment that is free from gendered-based discrimination including sexual assault and other gender-based discrimination. Through this process Feibleman believes that Jane Doe was given preferential treatment which is the basis of his lawsuit. Both parties were advised not to speak with those who may be connected to the incident but did not enforce this rule on Jane Doe who allegedly spoke to witnesses about her interpretation of the interaction. Columbia interviewed 12 witnesses including Jane Doe and Feibleman between October and December 2016. Columbia University's Gender-Based Misconduct policy allows students to seek private counsel and states that Columbia will provide an attorney-advisor at no cost to the student. Feibleman alleges that he was discouraged from hiring a lawyer even though Jane Doe was with counsel. Feibleman submitted the recording into evidence and got an expert report from Dr. David Greenblatt that concluded that Jane Doe did not lack the capacity to consent to sexual activity. The Title IX investigation team did not allow these documents to be seen or heard by the 3 person panel deciding the outcome of the hearing. Feibleman was barred from cross examining his accuser and was barred from viewing the evidence against him. The panel determined that Jane Doe lacked the capacity to consent and revoked Feibleman's degree. On May 13, 2019, Feibleman filed the lawsuit.

== Outside factors ==
In 2011, the Obama Administration wrote a Dear Colleague letter in which universities responded by altering policies to eliminate hearings and cross-examinations for sexual assault victims. The accused students of sexual assault are majority male bringing in the anti-male bias within the Title IX investigations. The Dear Colleague letter allowed institutions to use single-investigator models in Title IX cases. Previously, Columbia received negative attention due to the Columbia University rape accusation controversy. Former United States Secretary of Education, Betsy DeVos, issued a more balanced due process, with due process rights extending to those accused.

== Lawsuit ==
On May 13, 2019, Feibleman commenced action against Columbia University alleging erroneous outcome and selective enforcement under Title IX. Feibleman brought seven claims for violations of Title IX, breach of contract, and violations of New York City Human Rights Laws. July 15, 2019 Columbia University moved to dismiss five out of the seven claims. On February 24, 2020, Judge Valerie Caproni sustained the motion to dismiss and all claims moved forward into discovery. December 23, 2020 both parties reached a settlement before any depositions could take place and Columbia reinstated Feiblemans diploma including his rights and privileges as an alumnus in good standing. Feibleman alleges the conditions of the settlement prevent him from disclosing the sum he won, so to make a point he bought a Lamborghini sports car three days after the settlement.
