= Dual living in Australia =

In Australia the dual occupancy concept was proposed by the Melbourne and Metropolitan Board of Works in 1981 to enable existing houses and housing lots to be subdivided into two to make more efficient use of existing facilities and urban infrastructure, to provide support links between the two households and to minimise external maintenance and gardening burdens. Nowadays, accessory dwelling units are increasingly being legitimized by state and local governments. These units can be a division of, addition to, or separate from the principal dwelling and are usually subject to minimum allotment sizes, site coverage, access and setback requirements. While dual properties are a fairly new concept in Australia, they have long been a common style of dwelling in countries including Sweden, Japan and the United States.

== History ==
The dual occupancy concept has been encouraged by both the MOH and Metropolitan Planning Agencies through planning scheme Amendment 150 in 1981 to enable existing houses and housing lots to be subdivided into two (initially, dual occupancy was in the form of two dwellings on a single block of land in residential zones, and later this measure was extended to permit subdivision of the land into two separate titles) to make more efficient use of existing facilities and urban infrastructure, to provide support links between the two households and to minimise external maintenance and gardening burdens.

More recently accessory dwelling units are increasingly being legitimized by state and local governments. These units can be a division of, addition to, or separate from the principal dwelling and are usually subject to minimum allotment sizes, site coverage, access and setback requirements. Formerly, in some jurisdictions occupancy had been restricted to family members or relatives, but these days accessory dwellings are generally not subject to such restrictions and are marketed as suitable for elderly parents, adult children or an income-generating tenant.

There are also developments in apartment design in Australia that can enable multigenerational living. Dual-key apartments are beginning to be developed in inner- and mid-suburban areas.

In 2018, New South Wales led the construction of new granny flats while Victoria had the fewest number of new granny flats constructed. In the same year, Sydney’s Central Park’s first phase of development included 18% dual-key apartments, with a variety of configurations. In 2019, the federal government launched a study concerning prefabricated buildings and smaller homes citing affordable housing, extra space for family members, and support for the construction industry as reasons for the study.

The government provide $2 million for the initial study and then plans to set up an innovation lab to help manufacturers design prefabricated buildings.

== Houses types ==
A dual-key property, typically located in inner-city and in inner- or mid-suburban areas, is effectively one main property, divided into two dwellings, but instead of two exactly mirrored units like a duplex, it is usually a house on one side with a unit on the other. Typically, these involve a one-bedroom apartment located next to a studio, but can involve different combinations of studios and one- or two-bedroom apartments. Dual-key property, in fact, can be viewed as the modern day version of a "granny flat". These apartments offering both internal household flexibility (when household needs change, the two units can be lived in as one) and a way of paying off mortgages (one unit can be rented out separately to help pay off a mortgage), that make bank finance more available to young buyers. Dual‐key apartments, that marry the benefits of both privacy and safety can be explored as a viable form of multigenerational living. Also, such houses, as well as duplexes, contribute to higher residential density in the rural-urban fringe. Dual-key properties are cheaper to build than a duplex and get similar cash returns. But, in addition to advantages, there are also disadvantages: such properties offer limited capital growth; banks may have reservations in approving mortgages for this type of property; the secondary resale market is limited, because there is minimal demand for this type of property from home owners. Dual-key properties are mainly built in Queensland and Sydney.

A duplex is a single residential building with two dwellings under the one roof and a dividing wall between. If a duplex is subdivided into two separate titles, each home can be sold separately. A dual occupancy is two dwellings on a single lot. Generally it implies separate services and at least the potential to subdivide at some point in the future. It is often misused to represent primary and secondary dwellings or dual-keys properties. The main differences between dual occupancy and duplex properties are that: a duplex gives you greater land title flexibility; more land is usually required for a duplex and there are greater costs associated with a duplex.

The term granny flat is often used for a secondary dwelling on a property. The land is not subdivided with construction requiring approval from the council or relevant authority. The approval processes vary between States and Territories, and between councils.
