= Cassia Spohn =

American criminologist

Cassia Cathleen Spohn
- Education: University of Nebraska–Lincoln
- Known for: Research on rape law
- Awards: 2013 Faculty Achievement Award for Defining Edge Research in Social Sciences from Arizona State University
- Scientific career
- Fields: Criminology, criminal justice
- Workplaces: Arizona State University
- Thesis: The role of advisory boards in the national policy-making process (1978)

Cassia Cathleen Spohn is a Foundation Professor at Arizona State University, where she is also the director of the School of Criminology and Criminal Justice.

== Education ==
Spohn attended the University of Nebraska–Lincoln, where she received her B.A. in journalism and political science in 1973, and her M.A. and Ph.D. in political science in 1975 and 1978, respectively.

== Career ==
Spohn joined the faculty of the University of Nebraska Omaha in 1978 as an assistant professor in the Goodrich Scholarship Program. In 1987, she was appointed a professor in the Department of Criminal Justice there, a position she held until joining Arizona State University in 2006. From 2005 to 2006, she served as the chair of the Department of Criminal Justice at the University of Nebraska Omaha. In 2011, she became a Foundation Professor at Arizona State University.

== Research ==
Spohn has published over 100 papers on various subjects in the field of criminal justice, including the effects of race and sex on federal sentencing decisions, the deterrent effect of prison, and the processing of sexual assault cases. In 1987, the Supreme Court of the United States cited her research in the landmark capital punishment case McCleskey v. Kemp.

== Honors and awards ==
In 1985, Spohn became a Graduate College Faculty Fellow at the University of Nebraska–Lincoln. In 2013, she received the Faculty Achievement Award for Defining Edge Research in Social Sciences from Arizona State University.

== Editorial activities ==
In 2011, Spohn became the editor-in-chief of Justice Quarterly.
