= Sarah-Jane (singer) =

Swiss singer

Sarah-Jane (born September 26, 1985) is a Swiss demotic singer (schlager, volksmusik) from the Canton of Basel-Country. She works with composer Carlo Brunner (brother of Maya Brunner).

== Biography ==
At the age of six months, Sarah-Jane (the biological daughter of Indian parents) was adopted by a married Swiss couple. She spent her childhood in Switzerland and still lives there today, in the area of Sissach (Canton Basel-Country).

== Career ==
Sarah-Jane was discovered in 2003 during a talent contest of the "Alpenschlagerfestival" (Festival for schlager music of the Alps) in Engelberg. In 2004 she reached second place in the Swiss elimination round for the 2004 Grand Prix der Volksmusik with her song "Ich bin noch viel zu jung". In the final contest she had to content herself with rank 16. In 2005 she managed second place in the same contest with her song "Einmal hin, einmal her" after winning the Swiss pre-selection.

She sang the Swiss national anthem before the opening game of the UEFA Euro 2008.

== Discography ==
- 2004: Ich bin noch viel zu jung (MCP Sound&Media / Tell Music AG / phontana)
- 2005: Einmal hin, einmal her (MCP Sound&Media / Tell Music AG / phontana)
- 2007: Lebensfreude pur (MCP Sound&Media / Tell Music AG / phontana)
