= Verified =

United Nations program to counter COVID-19 misinformation

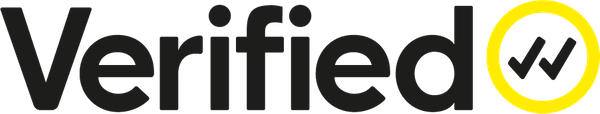
Logo

Verified is a United Nations project to improve access to accurate information. In the project the United Nations seeks to organize a network of millions of online volunteers to curate and fact check information online. Verified has held a social media campaigns using hashtags to raise awareness about misinformation, such as #PledgetoPause, #ItsPossible and #OnlyTogether.

The project is a response to misinformation online related to COVID-19. The project is especially concerned with online distribution of information.

India has expressed special interest in the project and is an organizer of it along with 12 other countries. wikiHow has also partnered with Verified.
