= Pendency of court cases in India =

Pendency of court cases in India is the delay in the disposal of cases (lawsuits), to provide justice to an aggrieved person or organisation, by judicial courts at all levels. In legal contexts, pendency is the state of a case that is pending; that is, it has been opened but not concluded.

The judiciary in India works in hierarchy at three levels: federal or supreme court, state or high courts, and district courts. The court cases are categorised into two types: civil and criminal. As on 6 October 2026, the total number of pending cases at all levels went above 59 million, including over 180,000 court cases pending for more than 30 years in district and high courts. As on date, 5.90 crores cases are pending which includes (5.24 crore cases are pending in District Courts, 65.32 lakhs cases are pending in High Court and around 95000 cases in Supreme Court). Government itself is the biggest litigant having 50% of the pending cases being sponsored by the state. Land and property disputes account for the largest set of pending cases. About 20% of all pending cases are related to land and property disputes, which is also 66% of all pending civil cases in India; and 25% of all cases decided by the Supreme Court involve land disputes.

India has one of the largest number of pending court cases in the world. Many judges and government officials have said that the pendency of cases is the biggest challenge before Indian judiciary. According to a 2018 Niti Aayog strategy paper, at the then-prevailing rate of disposal of cases in the courts, it would take more than 324 years to clear the backlog. At that time in 2018, the pending cases stood at 29 million. With the cases taking time in courts, it leads to delays in the delivery of justice for both victim and accused. In April 2022, a court in Bihar state acquitted a man of murder for lack of evidence after he spent 28 years in jail.

Pendency of cases cost India more than 2% of GDP. Rule of Law Index 2026, a country ranking published by the World Justice Project, ranked India at 116 out of 143 countries in the civil justice category and at 90 out of 143 countries in the criminal justice category. U.S News & World Report ranked India at 54 out of 89 countries with "Well-developed legal frameworks" in 2024.

A quasi-judicial system also exists in parallel to the judiciary which adjudicates specialized matters. They operate independently of the courts and they have huge pendency too. Some examples of the quasi-judicial bodies include Consumer Disputes Redressal Commission, Income-Tax Appellate Tribunal.

== Causes of pendency ==
=== Too few judges and non-judicial staff ===
In 2022, the sanctioned number of judges in India was 21.03 judges per million population. The absolute sanctioned number of judges was 34 in Supreme Court—it has since been increased to 37, excluding the Chief Justice of India, 1108 in high courts, and 24,631 in district courts. The law commission of India and Justice V S Malimath Committee had recommended in the past to raise the number of judges to 50 judges per million population, or 20,000 population per judge.

The sanctioned number of judges of the Supreme Court of India can be increased by the Parliament passing a law. The sanctioned number of judges of a High Court can be increased by the High Court making a recommendation and after it has been approved by the respective state government, its governor, the Chief Justice of India and the union government. The sanctioned number of district court judges can be increased by the respective high court after approval from the state government.

During All India Chief Justices Conference 2022, the officials promised to increase the sanctioned number of district court judges by 110% in a phased manner on the basis of weighted case disposal rate.

=== Vacant judicial positions ===
Despite the sanctioned number of judges, courts in India have often not worked at full capacity due to vacant positions. In 2022, there were 14.4 judges per million population in India. It has changed marginally from 13.2 in 2016. In comparison, there are 210 judges per million people in Europe and 150 in the United States. Non-judicial staff positions also remain vacant with some states having vacancy rates up to 25% in 2018–19.

Vacancies in courts keep on arising periodically due to retirement, resignation, demise, or elevation of judges. The appointment of judges is a long process. Supreme Court judges are recommended for appointment by the Supreme Court collegium, consisting of the Chief Justice of India and the four remaining senior-most judges of the Supreme court. The names have to be approved by the union government before being appointed by the President.

The high court judges are recommended for appointment by the High Court collegium consisting of the Chief Justice of the High Court, and two remaining senior-most judges of the high court. The names have to be approved by the state government, the governor, the Chief Justice of India, and the union government before being appointed by the President.

The union government and the state government are binding to abide by the suggestion of the Chief Justice of India, the Chief Justice of the High court and their collegium in the appointment of the judges. However, the rule is seldom followed in time and the union government would delay the appointment or return the names for appointment. As per rule, the union government must approve the appointments in 3–4 weeks if the collegium reiterates the names.

The lack of coordination and cooperation is a major cause for the vacancy in the higher judiciary. In some cases, the appointment of judges has been delayed for 4 years due to the names pending with the union government for approval.

The district or lower court judge appointments in a state are made by the respective high court, the governor, and the State Public Service Commission. The exams are conducted for the appointment of the district judges and the civil judges. The examination for the civil judges appointment is conducted by the State Public Service Commission in 10 states only; while all other examination for the judge's appointment in a state jurisdiction is conducted by the High Court themselves. The examination and appointment process are not efficient. In 2018, Supreme Court noted that there was a mismatch in the number of posts vacant in the lower courts and the recruitment underway. In 2022, Bihar Public Service Commission took 30 months just to complete the examination. The union government has proposed setting up AIJS (All India Judicial Service) to tackle vacancies in the lower judiciary by centralising the recruitment process.

Lower judiciary suffers also from not attracting and retaining talented judges, and lack of career progression. Many judges have been quitting the judiciary to go into private practice or join top private law firms, as it offers a lot more in terms of remuneration. Many states have been criticised for the pay offered to lower court judges. Recommendations of the Judicial Pay Commission and the Supreme Court orders to increase the judges salary are not implemented by the states. In Delhi Judiciary exam 2019, 66 percent seats could not be filled as candidates were simply unable to score even the cut off marks. In Jammu and Kashmir judiciary exam 2019, not one candidate passed the district judge exam for the fourth consecutive time. In Tamil Nadu judiciary exam 2019, of around 3,500 lawyers appearing for the district judge examination, none passed.

=== Inadequate funding ===
Except the Supreme Court which is funded by the central government, all the expenses of the High Court and the District Courts in a state are funded by the respective state government. As of 2018, 92% of all expenditure on the judiciary was borne by the states. This includes salary of judges, non-judicial staff and all operation costs. In 2019, India spent 0.08% of its GDP on the judiciary. All states and union territories allocated less than 1% of its annual budget on the judiciary, except Delhi with 1.9%. There is no guideline for the state expenditure on the judiciary to ensure higher efficiency of the judiciary.

In comparison, United States spends 2% of its annual budget on judiciary.

=== Lack of infrastructure ===
District or lower courts are prone to lack of infrastructure. In 2022, there were only 20,143 court halls and 17,800 residential units for judicial officers available to use against the sanctioned strength of 24,631 lower court judges. Only 40% of the lower court buildings have fully functional toilets with some having no provisions for regular cleaning. Lower courts also suffer from the lack of digital infrastructure, video conferencing rooms, and video connectivity to jails and officers. Development of the infrastructure facilities for judiciary rests with the State Governments. In 2021, Chief Justice N V Ramana had proposed to set up NJIAI (National Judicial Infrastructure Authority of India) to perform administrative work of the judiciary including infrastructure development. In comparison, there are similar body within Judiciary in other countries, for example, Administrative Office of the United States Courts in US.

=== Abuse of legal procedure ===
Court cases proceed as per rules described in CrPC (Code of Criminal Procedure) and CPC (Code of Civil Procedure). CrPC and CPC have been criticised for being archaic. Though amendments were made to CPC in 1999 and 2002, which fixed 30-90 days time limit for different rules in the CPC, and allowed maximum three adjournments. However, Supreme Court of India struck down these amendments in 2005, citing their inherent powers. Adjournments and non-compliance of rules have been used as tools to delay the proceedings. Lawyers unrestrictedly argue with unrelated oral arguments and submit impractical, long written pleadings to waste time and delay the proceedings.

In contrast, while hearing a case in October 2022, Supreme Court of India concluded the hearing in only 8 days after it set the time limits for arguments, and allowed no repetitions. In 2023, Supreme Court of India while expressing concern, again recommended the time limits in CPC to avoid delay in the proceedings.

In CrPC, one rule does not allow criminal cases to proceed if either an accused or a witness is not present before the court. This rule alone accounts for the delay in over 60% of all pending criminal cases, as per NJDG in November 2022.

Corruption and apathy of officials helps in the aiding and abetting abuse of the legal procedure. Judges have been investigated and dismissed for involvement in corruption. Investigation officials have been caught tampering with evidence. An influential politician was acquitted of the assault charges despite the available video evidence. Prison rules have been changed to provide bail to selective political persons.

Singapore, which derived its civil procedure code from the English Law similar to India, used to have delays of upto 10 years in the disposal of civil cases in the 1990's. These delays were largely due to the abuse of civil procedure by the contesting parties. However, after the judicial reforms, the delays became negligible and Singapore now ranks among the top countries with civil and criminal justice system.

Parliament of India has passed three new laws in 2024, Bharatiya Nagarik Suraksha Sanhita, Bharatiya Sakshya Act, 2023, and Bharatiya Nyaya Sanhita which replaced the CrPC, Indian Evidence Act, and Indian Penal Code respectively. The union government claims that the new laws will provide justice in criminal cases within 3 years.

=== Ineffective executive and legislative ===
The disputes and complaints which arise are not resolved by the executive government to the satisfaction of the aggrieved individual and in a fair manner. Laws passed by the legislative may have deficiencies and loopholes. The ineffectiveness of the legislative and the executive administration has led to the docket explosion of cases in the courts. Judges have criticised that the executive and the legislative are not using their full potential which is leading to bad governance and hence putting the burden on the courts.

== Statistics by state ==
Courthall shortfall is calculated as lack of courthalls as percentage of the total sanctioned strength of the judges. A negative percentage means courthalls are in excess. Case clearance rate (CCR) is cases disposed in a year as a percentage of new cases filed in the same year. CCR of less than 100 means case pendency will increase, CCR equal to 100 means case pendency will remain same, CCR of more than 100 means case pendency will decrease. NA: Not Available. (Source: India Justice Report, 2022).

Majority of court cases disposed each year includes magisterial cases (crimes for which prison is 3 years or less), and miscellaneous criminal and bail applications.

| State/UT | Average High Court Case Pendency (in Years) (2022) | Average District Court Case Pendency (in Years) (2020) | Budget per capita on judiciary (Rs.) (2022–23) | Population per High Court Judge (in Thousand) (2025) | Population per District Court Judge (in Thousand)(2025) | Courthall shortfall (%) (2022) | Case clearance rate of High Court (2024) | Case clearance rate of District Court (2024) |
|---|---|---|---|---|---|---|---|---|
| India | 5.47 | 3.18 | 182 | 1871 | 69 | 14.7 | 94 | 96 |
| Andaman and Nicobar Islands (UT) | 9.89 | NA | 498 | 2335 | NA | NA | 100 | 153 |
| Andhra Pradesh | 7.48 | 2.20 | 187 | 1784 | 94 | 4.0 | 104 | 96 |
| Arunachal Pradesh | 3.61 | NA | 280 | 1729 | 48 | 36.6 | 91 | 113 |
| Assam | 3.61 | 2.60 | 118 | 1729 | 78 | 13.4 | 91 | 84 |
| Bihar | 4.96 | 5.66 | 101 | 3836 | 84 | 20.2 | 96 | 95 |
| Chandigarh (UT) | 6.75 | 1.30 | 746 | 1241 | 41 | 3.3 | 107 | 81 |
| Chhattisgarh | 4.08 | 2.00 | 135 | 1929 | 66 | 2.7 | 113 | 100 |
| Dadra and Nagar Haveli and Daman and Diu (UT) | NA | NA | 62 | 1931 | 241 | 14.3 | 83 | 88 |
| Delhi (UT) | NA | 2.40 | 780 | 582 | 27 | 32.5 | 90 | 78 |
| Goa | NA | 2.62 | NA | 1931 | 39 | 6.0 | 83 | 108 |
| Gujarat | 4.90 | 4.40 | 177 | 2288 | 61 | 1.1 | 95 | 103 |
| Haryana | 6.75 | 1.70 | 337 | 1241 | 56 | 27.7 | 107 | 112 |
| Himachal Pradesh | 3.10 | 2.20 | 379 | 628 | 47 | 13.7 | 92 | 91 |
| Jammu and Kashmir (UT) | 5.71 | 5.40 | 235 | 940 | 49 | 38.2 | 95 | 90 |
| Jharkhand | 6.60 | 3.80 | 154 | 2528 | 79 | 4.6 | 129 | 103 |
| Karnataka | 5.23 | 2.98 | 203 | 1398 | 59 | 14.3 | 88 | 94 |
| Kerala | 6.50 | 2.70 | 313 | 802 | 67 | 5.8 | 103 | 113 |
| Ladakh (UT) | 5.71 | NA | 332 | 940 | 27 | 47.1 | 95 | 93 |
| Lakshadweep (UT) | 6.50 | NA | 356 | 802 | 17 | 0.0 | 103 | 93 |
| Madhya Pradesh | NA | 2.90 | 158 | 2686 | 52 | 24.0 | 88 | 101 |
| Maharashtra | NA | 4.10 | 250 | 1931 | 66 | 7.3 | 83 | 87 |
| Manipur | 3.38 | 2.50 | 236 | 820 | 66 | 33.9 | 79 | 103 |
| Meghalaya | 2.09 | 3.70 | 246 | 852 | 60 | 46.5 | 92 | 107 |
| Mizoram | 3.61 | 2.50 | 458 | 1729 | 28 | 35.4 | 91 | 61 |
| Nagaland | 3.61 | 3.50 | 204 | 1729 | 94 | 11.8 | 91 | 90 |
| Odisha | 6.05 | 5.65 | 184 | 2603 | 55 | 16.9 | 101 | 93 |
| Puducherry (UT) | 6.38 | NA | NA | 1215 | 66 | 38.5 | 105 | 108 |
| Punjab | 6.75 | 1.50 | 343 | 1241 | 43 | 14.9 | 107 | 103 |
| Rajasthan | 5.46 | 3.40 | 197 | 2508 | 63 | 15.9 | 86 | 104 |
| Sikkim | 1.85 | 0.90 | 966 | 234 | 30 | 28.6 | 86 | 103 |
| Tamil Nadu | 6.38 | 3.00 | 214 | 1215 | 75 | 9.3 | 105 | 100 |
| Telangana | 6.85 | 2.50 | 238 | 1281 | 86 | 3.1 | 102 | 96 |
| Tripura | 0.99 | 2.57 | 336 | 844 | 38 | 32.8 | 111 | 101 |
| Uttar Pradesh | 11.34 | 6.20 | 125 | 3043 | 88 | 25.4 | 78 | 97 |
| Uttarakhand | 3.58 | 2.80 | 265 | 1484 | 43 | 21.1 | 75 | 101 |
| West Bengal | 9.89 | 5.80 | NA | 2335 | 114 | 17.6 | 100 | 64 |

== Efforts of Government to reduce pendency ==
The Government of India has taken certain measures to reduce judicial pendency.

=== E-Courts Phase III ===
The e-Courts Phase III implementation with a sanctioned budget of Rs. 7210 Crore is expected to help in disposal of pending cases by focusing on use of digital methods to make court functioning online. It also includes use of AI to help judges make decisions.

=== Lok Adalats ===
Lok Adalat acts as an alternative dispute resolution mechanism and helps lower the burden on the courts.

=== Reducing Government Litigation ===
The Government had also through its various ministries directed measures that would help reduce litigation initiated by the Government. An example of this is the upward revision of monetary thresholds for filing tax appeals.

=== Vivad se Vishwas Schemes ===
The Government came up with settlement schemes in Direct Taxes on 2 occasions. Once in 2020 & again in 2024 which helped settle cases at various appellate levels including High court and Supreme court cases with relief from penalty and interest liabilities.

Apart from these tax settlement scheme, the Government also did a similar scheme for contractual disputes in 2023 that enabled a onetime settlement of eligible government contractual disputes involving arbitral and court awards.

=== Use of National Law Universities ===
In October 2026, the Government had convened a meeting with the Vice Chancellors of 19 Law Universities of various states in India to deliberate on methods to reduce the pendency of cases. The Government requested these Universities to utilise their pro bono clubs, researchers and students to carry out an analysis of case pendency in selected districts and to suggest strategies to help reduce pendency in these districts
