= Scheduled castes in Northeast India =

Scheduled castes in Northeastern region of India

Scheduled Castes forms a small portion of the population of the Northeast India and it is the region of mainland India with the lowest population of the Scheduled castes. Out of the seven states of the region, only of five of them have recognized Scheduled caste communities, while the rest of them being Arunachal Pradesh and Nagaland are only states in India with no recognized Scheduled castes.

== Background ==
The Northeast part of India had remained isolated from the mainland India for a large part of the history leading it to develop a distinct culture of its own. It is an isolated and hilly areas with dense forest and remote transportation, while being inhabited by hill people. Majority of the hilly parts are inhabited by the tribes who were animists and had their own culture, with no traces of a rigid caste-based hierarchy. Due to this, large population of Northeast is inhabited by the hill people in their particular autonomous region and are recognized as Scheduled Tribes by the Government of India.

== History ==
The society of the communities residing in the Northeast part of India have more common culture with the Southeast and East Asia, in comparison to the South Asia and have no concept of Caste system. As their society does not have any caste system, there was no concept of lower castes who are known as Dalits in the mainland India. The majority of the tribal communities, residing the hill region or the hill people are recognized as Scheduled Tribes and due to the community being declared completely as Tribe, there is no scope for classification as Other Backward Class or Schedule Caste.

Though during the medieval time period, due to the Sanskritization and influence of the culture of mainland India communities such as Assamese and Meitei there was creation of Varna system, many communities who were at the lower stata of the society were later recognized as Scheduled castes due to similarities with the Dalits of the mainland India.

During the British colonization of the Indian subcontinent, many people from the mainland part were brought to the Northeast and Burma as administrative, military and labour workforce and a big portion of these labour workforce had members of the Scheduled castes communities, who later settled in this part.

The largest portion of the Scheduled Castes in Northeast India are ethnically Bengali Hindus settled majorly in Assam and Tripura, with small population of Meghalaya, Manipur and Mizoram who left their homes in Bangladesh during Partition of India and 1971 Bangladesh atrocities.

== Demography ==
=== Assam ===
Scheduled Castes		Population	
Code	Communities	Total (2011)	% of total
001	Bansphor	16,359	0.73
002	Bhuimali, Mali	69,535	3.12
003	Brittial Bania, Bania	50,598	2.27
004	Dhupi, Dhobi	52,431	2.35
005	Dugla, Dholi	7,991	0.36
006	Hira	55,300	2.48
007	Jalkeot	24,774	1.11
008	Jhalo, Malo, Jhalo Malo	80,376	3.60
009	Kaibartta, Jaliya	6,93,219	31.07
010	Lal Begi	790	0.03
011	Mahara	1,822	0.08
012	Mehtar, Bhangi	8,835	0.39
013	Muchi, Rishi	77,643	3.48
014	Namasudra	6,31,542	28.30
015	Patni	1,81,904	8.16
016	Sutradhar	66,303	2.97
Generic castes, etc. (those who identified as Dalit, Harijan)		2,11,899	9.50
		22,31,321	

=== Manipur ===
Scheduled Castes		Population	
Code	Communities	Total (2011)	% of total
001	Dhupi, Dhobi	122	0.13
002	Lois	85,543	87.89
003	Muchi, Ravidas	190	0.20
004	Namasudra	3,747	3.85
005	Patni	3,664	3.76
006	Sutradhar	92	0.09
007	Yaithibi	1,532	1.57
Generic castes, etc. (those who identified as Dalit, Harijan)		2,438	2.51
		97,328	

=== Meghalaya ===
Scheduled Castes		Population	
Code	Communities	Total (2011)	% of total
001	Bansphor	250	1.44
002	Bhuimali, Mali	383	2.20
003	Brittial Bania, Bania	308	1.77
004	Dhupi, Dhobi	598	3.44
005	Dugla, Dholi	57	0.33
006	Hira	61	0.35
007	Jalkeot	39	0.22
008	Jhalo, Malo, Jhalo Malo	1,895	10.92
009	Kaibartta, Jaliya	1,143	6.85
010	Lal Begi	10	0.05
011	Mahara	26	0.14
012	Mehtar, Bhangi	541	3.11
013	Muchi, Rishi	1,155	6.65
014	Namasudra	3,376	19.45
015	Patni	1,039	5.98
016	Sutradhar	285	1.64
Generic castes, etc. (those who identified as Dalit, Harijan)		6,189	35.66
		17,355	

=== Mizoram ===
Scheduled Castes		Population	
Code	Communities	Total (2011)	% of total
001	Bansphor	45	3.69
002	Bhuimali, Mali	54	4.43
003	Brittial Bania, Bania	67	5.50
004	Dhupi, Dhobi	91	7.47
005	Dugla, Dholi	27	2.22
006	Hira	48	3.94
007	Jalkeot	2	0.16
008	Jhalo, Malo, Jhalo Malo	10	0.82
009	Kaibartta, Jaliya	18	1.48
010	Lal Begi	14	1.15
011	Mahara	36	2.96
012	Mehtar, Bhangi	21	1.72
013	Muchi, Rishi	235	19.30
014	Namasudra	136	11.17
015	Patni	70	5.75
016	Sutradhar	48	3.94
Generic castes, etc. (those who identified as Dalit, Harijan)		296	24.30
		1,218	

=== Tripura ===
Scheduled Castes		Population	
Code	Communities	Total (2011)	% of total
001	Bagdi	510	0.08
002	Bhuimali	272	0.04
003	Bhunar	178	0.03
004	Chamar, Muchi	13,579	2.07
005	Dandasi	5	<0.01
006	Dhenuer	65	0.01
007	Dhoba	56,513	8.63
008	Dum	41	<0.01
009	Ghasi	204	0.03
010	Gour	6,854	1.05
011	Gur	86	0.01
012	Jalia Kaibarta	1,06,849	16.31
013	Kahar	357	0.05
014	Kalindi	135	0.02
015	Kan	27	<0.01
016	Kanda	2,574	0.39
017	Kanugh	49	<0.01
018	Keot	302	0.05
019	Khadit	18	<0.01
020	Kharia	1,409	0.21
021	Koch	815	0.12
022	Koir	102	0.02
023	Kol	1,079	0.16
024	Kora	117	0.02
025	Kotal	9	<0.01
026	Mahishyadas	1,53,034	23.37
027	Mali	55,009	8.40
028	Mehtor	1,851	0.28
029	Musahar	327	0.05
030	Namasudra	2,15,267	32.87
031	Patni	7,235	1.10
032	Sabar	4,429	0.68
033	Dhuli, Sabyakar, Badyakar	9,344	1.43
034	Nat, Natta	1,643	0.25
Generic castes, etc. (those who identified as Dalit, Harijan)		14,630	2.23
		6,54,918	

== District wise population ==
District		Scheduled Castes		
Name	Population	Total (2011)	Percent	Top 3 largest
Assam
Kokrajhar	8,87,142	29,570	3.33	Namasudra (9,171); Sutradhar (5,764); Jalia Kaibarta (4,229)
Goalpara	10,08,183	45,094	4.47	Namasudra (11,474); Jalia Kaibarta (10,475); Sutradhar (6,945)
Barpeta	16,93,622	95,320	5.63	Namasudra (35,781); Jalia Kaibarta (17,024); Jhalo Mala (10,085)
Dhubri	19,49,258	70,395	3.61	Namasudra (27,155); Jalia Kaibarta (9,755); Jhalo Malo (8,951)
Morigaon	9,57,423	1,17,841	12.31	Namasudra (58,263); Jalia Kaibarta (22,098); Hira (20,036)
Nagaon	28,23,768	2,66,350	9.43	Jalia Kaibarta (103,621); Namasudra (92,762); Patni (16,483)
Sonitpur	19,24,110	1,09,130	5.67	Jalia Kaibarta (51,031); Namasudra (22,268); Jhalo Malo (10,291)
Lakhimpur	10,42,137	81,840	7.85	Jalia Kaibarta (51,664); Namasudra (19,338); Brittial Bania (2,840)
Dhemaji	6,86,133	44,225	6.45	Jalia Kaibarta (16,503); Namasudra (15,200); Sutradhar (1,685)
Tinsukia	13,27,929	37,688	2.84	Jalia Kaibarta (16,870); Namasudra (7,008); Dhobi (1,557)
Dibrugarh	13,26,335	58,876	4.44	Jalia Kaibarta (31,676); Patni (3,841); Namasudra (3,756)
Sivasagar	11,51,050	42,347	3.68	Jalia Kaibarta (29,011); Patni (1,880); Muchi (1,112)
Jorhat	10,92,256	88,665	8.12	Jalia Kaibarta (64,249); Brittial Bania (3,891); Jhalo Malo (2,711)
Golaghat	10,66,888	62,298	5.84	Jalia Kaibarta (44,025); Muchi (5,446); Namasudra (2,151)
Karbi Anglong	9,56,313	44,961	4.70	Jalia Kaibarta (19,296); Namasudra (13,302); Muchi (2,247)
Dima Hasao	2,14,102	4,337	2.03	Bhinmali (968); Patni (900); Jalia Kaibarta (568)
Cachar	17,36,617	2,64,897	15.25	Patni (92,150); Jalia Kaibarta (60,150); Namasudra (43,573)
Karimganj	12,28,686	1,57,890	12.85	Namasudra (50,991); Jalia Kaibarta (29,614); Patni (29,232)
Hailakandi	6,59,296	70,659	10.72	Patni (31,985); Namasudra (14,612); Muchi (5,631)
Bongaigaon	7,38,804	82,784	11.21	Namasudra (37,638); Jalia Kaibarta (12,461); Sutradhar (9,551)
Chirang	4,82,162	35,135	7.29	Namasudra (21,678); Sutradhar (4,790); Jalia Kaibarta (2,988)
Kamrup	15,17,542	1,07,827	7.10	Namasudra (35,327); Jalia Kaibarta (24,750); Bhuinmali (11,076)
Kamrup Metropolitan	12,53,938	1,01,789	8.12	Namasudra (33,493); Jalia Kaibarta (24,708); Hira (3,817)
Nalbari	7,71,639	60,216	7.85	Namasudra (17,687); Jalia Kaibarta (17,539); Dhobi (4,091)
Baksa	9,50,075	73,083	7.69	Namasudra (30,716); Jalia Kaibarta (11,437); Sutradhar (6,231)
Darrang	9,28,500	40,260	4.34	Namasudra (11,274); Jalia Kaibarta (7,582); Jhalo Malo (6,949)
Udalguri	8,31,668	37,844	4.55	Namasudra (14,741); Jalia Kaibarta (7,367); Jhalo Malo (2,930)
	3,12,05,576	22,31,321	7.15	
Manipur
Senapati	4,79,148	1,000	0.21	Lois (82); Namasudra (53); Muchi (49)
Tamenglong	1,40,651	22	0.01	Namasudra (4); Dhobi (3); Lois (1)
Churachandpur	2,74,143	443	0.16	Yaithibi (205); Lois (133); Patni (8)
Bishnupur	2,37,399	22,113	9.31	Lois (21,907); Dhobi (5); Namasudra (4)
Thoubal	4,22,168	40,593	9.61	Lois (39,241); Yaithibi (1,222); Muchi (5)
Imphal West	5,17,992	16,530	3.19	Lois (15,778); Dhobi (23); Muchi (18)
Imphal East	4,56,113	15,839	3.47	Lois (7,961); Namasudra (3,663); Patni (3,648)
Ukhrul	1,83,998	248	0.13	Lois (50); Namasudra (20); Dhobi (12)
Chandel	1,44,182	540	0.37	Lois (390); Sutradhar (42); Dhobi (11)
	28,55,794	97,328	3.41	
Meghalaya
West Garo Hills	6,43,291	8,810	1.37	Namasudra (1,953); Jhalo Malo (1,851); Muchi (999)
East Garo Hills	3,17,917	509	0.16	Muchi (35); Bansphor (23); Patni (22)
South Garo Hills	1,42,334	319	0.22	Namasudra (86); Jalia Kaibarta (45); Bansphor (17)
West Khasi Hills	3,83,461	168	0.04	Jalia Kaibarta (31); Namasudra (13); Brittial Bania (6)
Ri-bhoi	2,58,840	590	0.23	Jalia Kaibarta (159); Sutradhar (33); Namasudra (26)
East Khasi Hills	8,25,922	5,642	0.68	Namasudra (1,086); Jalia Kaibarta (666); Dhobi (522)
Jaintia Hills	3,95,124	1,317	0.33	Namasudra (210); Patni (205); Mehtar (24)
	29,66,889	17,355	0.58	
Mizoram
Mamit	86,364	51	0.06	Muchi (17); Namasudra (6); Jhalo Malo (2)
Kolasib	83,955	84	0.10	Muchi (22); Namasudra (12); Mahara (7)
Aizawl	4,00,309	627	0.16	Namasudra (68); Dhobi (66); Brittial Bania (58)
Champhai	1,25,745	17	0.01	Dhobi (7); Patni (2); Jhalo Malo (2)
Serchhip	64,937	32	0.05	Hira (11); Mehtar (4); Muchi (1)
Lunglei	1,61,428	178	0.11	Muchi (100); Namasudra (24); Mahara (7)
Lawngtlai	1,17,894	146	0.12	Muchi (59); Patni (32); Sutradhar (16)
Saiha	56,574	83	0.15	Bansphor (12); Namasudra (12); Hira (10)
	10,97,206	1,218	0.11	
Tripura
West Tripura	17,24,619	3,38,094	19.60	Namasudra (138,179); Jalia Kaibarta (61,115); Mahisyadas (56,619)
South Tripura	8,75,144	1,40,168	16.02	Namasudra (45,570); Mahisyadas (44,052); Dhobi (21,558)
Dhalai	6,93,281	61,688	8.89	Jalia Kaibarta (23,295); Namasudra (15,179); Mahisyadas (6,180)
North Tripura	3,77,988	1,14,968	30.42	Mahisyadas (46,183); Mali (27,862); Namasudra (16,339)
	36,71,032	6,54,918	17.84	
