= List of Scheduled Castes in West Bengal =

Scheduled Castes in West Bengal
- Country: India
- Original state: West Bengal
- Population: 21,463,270 (2011)
- Reservation (Education): 23%
- Reservation (Employment): 22%

This list contains List of Scheduled Castes in West Bengal. There are 60 recognised Scheduled Castes in state of West Bengal. As per 2011 census, the population of Scheduled Castes accounts to 21.4 millions constituenting around 23.6% of the total state's population.

== List ==
Scheduled Caste		Population (as of 2011)	
Code	Communities	Total population	%age total
001	Bagdi, Duley	30,58,265	14.249
002	Bahelia	5,692	0.026
003	Baiti	13,753	0.064
004	Bantar	138	<0.001
005	Bauri	12,28,635	5.724
006	Beldar	5,261	0.025
007	Bhogta	18,269	0.085
008	Bhuimali	84,956	0.396
009	Bhuiya	1,40,359	0.654
010	Bind	70,426	0.328
011	Chamar, Muchi, Mochi, Charamakar, Rabidas, Rohit, Rishi	10,39,591	4.843
012	Chaupal	5,974	0.028
013	Dabgar	252	0.001
014	Damai (Nepali)	18,314	0.085
015	Dhobi, Dhupi	3,85,280	1.795
016	Doai	9,436	0.044
017	Dom, Dhangad	3,52,083	1.640
018	Dusadh, Dosadh, Dhari, Dhariya	65,429	0.305
019	Ghasi	17,909	0.083
020	Gonrhi	9,687	0.045
021	Halalkhor	1,174	0.005
022	Bhangi, Hela, Hari, Mehtar, Balmiki	4,31,257	2.009
023	Jalia Kaibarta	5,69,448	2.653
024	Jhalo Malo, Malo	3,03,618	1.414
025	Kadar	23,179	0.108
026	Kami (Nepali)	52,178	0.243
027	Kandra	1,12,038	0.522
028	Kanjar	435	0.002
029	Kaora	2,72,801	1.271
030	Koranga, Korenga	36,612	0.171
031	Kaur	13,059	0.061
032	Keot, Keyot	88,530	0.412
033	Khaira	1,29,001	0.601
034	Khatik	8,837	0.041
035	Koch	12,123	0.056
036	Konai	1,24,126	0.565
037	Konwar	4,376	0.020
038	Kotal	25,430	0.118
039	Kurariar	942	0.004
040	Lal Begi	481	0.002
041	Lohar	3,15,093	1.468
042	Mahar	34,793	0.162
043	Mal	3,06,234	1.427
044	Mallaah	50,252	0.234
045	Musahar	20,949	0.097
046	Namasudra	35,04,642	16.328
047	Nat	1,146	0.005
048	Nuniya	60,941	0.284
049	Paliya	1,05,290	0.491
050	Pan, Sawasi	28,259	0.133
051	Pasi	29,491	0.137
052	Patni	31,188	0.145
053	Poundra, Pod	24,50,260	11.416
054	Rajbanshi	38,01,677	17.712
055	Rajwar	1,12,184	0.523
056	Sarki (Nepali)	13,618	0.064
057	Sunri [excluding Saha]	3,37,609	1.573
058	Tiyar	2,27,800	1.061
059	Turi	35,116	0.163
060	Chain [in districts of Malda, Murshidabad, Nadia and Dakshin Dinajpur]	3,23,595	1.507
GENERIC CASTES (those who identified them as Harijan, Anushuchit Jati or Dalit)		9,33,781	4.350
		2,14,63,270	100%

== Demographics ==
=== District wise ===
As of 2011 census of India, the population of Scheduled Castes in West Bengal is given as per distribution in 19 districts of the state.

S. No	District		Scheduled Castes		
S. No	Name	Population	Population	Percentage	Largest castes (Top 3)
01	Darjeeling	18,46,823	3,17,275	17.18	Rajbanshi (163,391); Namasudra (45,185); Kami (Nepali) (33,280)
02	Jalpaiguri	38,72,846	14,58,278	37.65	Rajbanshi (922,603); Namasudra (341,261); Lohar (21,761)
03	Cooch Behar	28,22,780	14,14,336	50.10	Rajbanshi (1,063,369); Namasudra (178,393); Jalia Kaibarta (67,818)
04	Uttar Dinajpur	30,07,134	8,07,950	26.87	Rajbanshi (498,004); Namasudra (114,750); Hari, Mehtar (25,080)
05	Dakshin Dinajpur	16,76,276	4,82,754	28.79	Rajbanshi (260,958); Paliya (61,698); Namasudra (43,565)
06	Malda	39,88,845	8,35,430	20.94	Chain (195,418); Rajbanshi (159,456); Namasudra (108,781)
07	Murshidabad	71,03,807	8,97,534	12.63	Chain (127,517); Rajbanshi (90,174); Chamar, Muchi (88,724)
08	Birbhum	35,02,404	10,33,140	29.50	Bagdi (267,141); Chamar, Muchi (161,572); Mal (126,949)
09	Bardhaman	77,17,563	21,15,719	27.41	Bagdi (634,082); Bauri (350,881); Chamar, Muchi (255,377)
10	Nadia	51,68,488	15,46,917	29.93	Namasudra (903,186); Bagdi (116,197); Chamar, Muchi (104,528)
11	North 24 Parganas	1,00,09,781	21,69,084	21.67	Namasudra (856,371); Poundra (473,302); Chamar, Muchi (132,351)
12	Hooghly	55,19,145	13,44,021	24.35	Bagdi (630,219); Bauri (125,849); Namasudra (125,194)
13	Bankura	35,96,674	11,74,457	32.65	Bauri (350,220); Bagdi (288,292); Lohar (114,352)
14	Purulia	29,27,965	5,67,767	19.39	Bauri (242,773); Sunri (49,215); Rajwar (47,174)
15	Howrah	48,50,029	7,18,951	14.82	Bagdi (258,364); Poundra (100,097); Namasudra (61,368)
16	Kolkata	44,96,694	2,41,932	5.38	Namasudra (49,058); Poundra (34,881); Chamar, Muchi (27,104)
17	South 24 Parganas	81,61,961	25,64,034	31.41	Poundra (1,523,399); Bagdi (183,979); Namasudra (147,600)
18	Paschim Medinipur	59,13,457	11,28,269	19.08	Bagdi (370,604); Namasudra (76,953); Lohar (78,505)
19	Purba Medinipur	50,95,875	7,45,434	14.63	Poundra (150,625); Rajbanshi (125,908); Namasudra (93,828)
TOTAL		9,13,47,736	2,14,63,270	23.49	

=== Religion wise ===
The Scheduled Castes can only be Hindus, Sikhs or Buddhists as per The Constitution (Scheduled Castes) Order, 1950. The majority of Scheduled Castes in West Bengal are Hindus, with small population being Buddhists and Sikhs.

Communities	Population (2011)	Religious communities		
Communities	Population (2011)	Hindus	Sikhs	Buddhists
Bagdi, Duley	30,58,265	30,57,705	344	216
Bahelia	5,692	5,690	2	0
Baiti	13,753	13,751	2	0
Bantar	138	138	0	0
Bauri	12,28,635	12,28,411	123	101
Beldar	5,261	5,261	0	0
Bhogta	18,269	18,268	0	1
Bhuimali	84,956	84,931	18	7
Bhuiya	1,40,359	1,40,201	16	140
Bind	70,426	70,412	12	2
Chamar, Muchi, Mochi, Charamakar, Rabidas, Rohit, Rishi	10,39,591	10,39,302	260	82
Chaupal	5,974	5,973	1	0
Dabgar	252	252	0	0
Damai (Nepali)	18,314	18,165	10	139
Dhobi, Dhupi	3,85,280	3,85,173	58	49
Doai	9,436	9,435	1	0
Dom, Dhangad	3,52,083	3,52,018	43	22
Dusadh, Dosadh, Dhari, Dhariya	65,429	65,315	105	9
Ghasi	17,909	17,900	1	8
Gonrhi	9,687	9,687	0	0
Halalkhor	1,174	1,173	1	0
Bhangi, Hela, Mehtar, Balmiki	4,31,257	4,31,125	73	59
Jalia Kaibarta	5,69,448	5,69,317	89	42
Jhalo Malo, Malo	3,03,618	3,03,555	47	16
Kadar	23,179	23,174	5	0
Kami (Nepali)	52,178	51,949	13	216
Kandra	1,12,038	1,12,019	13	6
Kanjar	435	434	1	0
Kaora	2,72,801	2,72,736	39	16
Koranga, Korenga	36,612	36,605	5	2
Kaur	13,059	12,949	110	0
Keot, Keyot	88,530	88,512	12	6
Khaira	1,29,001	1,28,972	15	14
Khatik	8,837	8,830	3	4
Koch	12,123	12,122	1	0
Konai	1,24,126	1,24,098	22	6
Konwar	4,376	4,376	0	0
Kotal	25,430	25,421	6	3
Kurariar	942	941	0	1
Lal Begi	481	476	1	4
Lohar	3,15,093	3,15,006	74	13
Mahar	34,793	34,415	17	321
Mal	3,06,234	3,06,148	54	32
Mallaah	50,252	50,227	24	1
Musahar	20,949	20,944	4	1
Namasudra	35,04,642	35,04,782	550	310
Nat	1,146	1,146	0	0
Nuniya	60,941	60,920	13	8
Paliya	1,05,290	1,05,278	10	2
Pan, Sawasi	28,259	28,252	2	5
Pasi	29,491	29,459	24	8
Patni	31,188	31,177	11	0
Poundra, Pod	24,50,260	24,49,644	387	229
Rajbanshi	38,01,677	38,00,895	520	262
Rajwar	1,12,184	1,12,161	7	16
Sarki (Nepali)	13,618	13,413	4	201
Sunri [excluding Saha]	3,37,609	3,37,544	42	23
Tiyar	2,27,800	2,27,766	23	11
Turi	35,116	35,108	5	3
Chain	3,23,595	3,23,535	41	19
Generic Castes	9,33,781	9,30,716	493	2,572
	2,14,63,270	2,14,54,358	3,705	5,207
