= Kaibarta =

Kaibarta or Kaivarta may refer to:

- Kewat or Keot, a caste of northern India
- Kewat language, Bengali-Assamese language spoken in Nepal
- Kevatta Sutta, Buddhist scripture of Pali canon
- Haliya or Cāsi Kaivarta, a Bengali Hindu agriculturist caste, majority later identified as Mahishya
- Jalia Kaibarta, a Hindu fishing caste
- Kaivarta revolt, 1170 rebellion in medieval India

== See also ==
- Keota (disambiguation)
