= List of Scheduled Castes in Odisha =

This articles contains a list of Scheduled Caste communities in Odisha by their population. They constitutes around 7.1 million, forming 17.13% of state's total population. There are 93 recognized Scheduled Castes in the state.

== List ==
The list of communities listed as Scheduled Castes in Odisha, as per The Constitution (Scheduled Castes) Order, 1950 and The Odisha Scheduled Castes, Scheduled Tribes and Backward Classes (Regulation of Issuance and Verification of Caste Certificates) Act, 2011 are:

1. Adi Andhra
2. Amant, Amat, Dandachhatra Majhi
3. Audhelia
4. Badaik
5. Bagheti, Baghuti
6. Bajikar
7. Bari
8. Bariki
9. Basor, Burud
10. Bauri, Buna Bauri, Dasia Bauri
11. Bauti
12. Bavuri
13. Bedia, Bejia
14. Beldar
15. Bhata
16. Bhoi
17. Chachati
18. Chakali
19. Chamar, Chamara, Chamar-Ravidas, Chamar-Rohidas, Mochi, Muchi, Satnami
20. Chandala
21. Chandhai Maru
22. Dandasi
23. Dewar, Dhibara, Keuta, Kaibarta
24. Dhanwar
25. Dhoba, Dhobi
26. Dom, Dombo, Duria Dom
27. Dosadha
28. Ganda
29. Ghantarghada, Ghantra
30. Ghasi, Ghasia
31. Ghogia
32. Ghusuria
33. Godagali
34. Godari
35. Godra
36. Gokha
37. Gorait, Korait
38. Haddi, Hadi, Hari
39. Irika
40. Jaggali
41. Kandra, Kandara, Kadama, Kuduma, Kodma, Kodama
42. Karua
43. Katia
44. Kela, Sapua Kela, Nalua Kela, Sabakhia Kela, Matia Kela
45. Khadala
46. Kodalo, Khodalo
47. Kori
48. Kummari
49. Kurunga
50. Laban
51. Laheri
52. Madari
53. Madiga
54. Mahuria
55. Mala, Jhala, Malo, Zala, Malha, Jhola
56. Mang
57. Mangali (in Koraput and Kalahandi districts)
58. Mangan
59. Mehra, Mahar
60. Mehtar, Bhangi
61. Mewar
62. Mirgan (in Navrangpur district)
63. Mundapotta
64. Musahar
65. Nagarchi
66. Namasudra
67. Paidi
68. Painda
69. Pamidi
70. Pan, Pano, Buna Pana, Desua Pana
71. Panchama
72. Panika
73. Panka
74. Pantanti
75. Pap
76. Pasi
77. Patial, Patikar, Patratanti, Patua
78. Rajna
79. Relli
80. Sabakhia
81. Samasi
82. Sanei
83. Sapari
84. Sauntia, Santia
85. Sidhria
86. Sinduria
87. Siyal, Khajuria
88. Tamadia
89. Tamudia
90. Tanla
91. Turi
92. Ujia
93. Valamiki, Valmiki

== Demographics ==
=== Community wise ===
Scheduled Castes		Population (2011)
Code	Communities	Population (2011)
001	Adi Andhra	2,051
002	Amant, Amat, Dandachhatra Manjhi	36,798
003	Audhelia	48
004	Badaik	14,623
005	Bagheti, Bagauti	28,434
006	Bajikar	249
007	Bari	130
008	Barika	4,397
009	Basor, Burud	81
010	Bauri, Buna Bauri, Dasia Bauri	5,23,127
011	Bauti	1,432
012	Bavuri	470
013	Bedia, Bejia	594
014	Beldar	3,725
015	Bhata	8,904
016	Bhoi	81,431
017	Chachati	29
018	Chakali	188
019	Chamar, Chamara, Chamar-Rohidas, Chamar-Ravidasi, Muchi, Satnami	1,77,331
020	Chandala	5,265
021	Chandai Maru	22
022	Dandasi	62,002
023	Dewar, Dhibara, Keuta, Kaibarta	9,95,062
024	Dhanuk	1,680
025	Dhoba, Dhobi	6,44,738
026	Dom, Domba, Duria Dom	7,06,232
027	Dosadha	1,912
028	Ganda	6,53,950
029	Ghantargadha, Ghantra	7,266
030	Ghasi, Ghasiya	1,14,066
031	Ghogia	829
032	Ghusuria	8,201
033	Godagali	9
034	Godari	72
035	Godra	3,337
036	Gokha	2,12,718
037	Gorait, Korait	442
038	Haddi, Hadi, Hela	2,28,712
039	Irika	304
040	Jaggalli	5,854
041	Kandra, Kandara, Kadama, Kuduma, Kodma, Kodama	5,29,717
042	Karua	7,322
043	Katia	23,866
044	Kela, Sapua Kela, Nalua Kela, Sabakhia Kela, Matia Kela	24,296
045	Khadala	87,551
046	Kodalo, Khodalo	82
047	Kori	309
048	Kummari	454
049	Kurunga	4,972
050	Laban	972
051	Laheri	2,897
052	Madari	4,226
053	Madiga	2,560
054	Mahuria	5,857
055	Mala, Malo, Jhalo Malo, Jhalo	21,313
056	Mang	86
057	Mangan	409
058	Mahar, Mehra	21,304
059	Mehtar, Bhangi	2,453
060	Mewar	411
061	Mundapotta	920
062	Musahar	52
063	Nagarchi	360
064	Namasudra	1,53,026
065	Paidi	244
066	Painda	511
067	Pamidi	18
068	Pano, Pan, Buna Pan, Desua Pan	12,05,099
069	Panchama	42
070	Panika	5,155
071	Panka	6,250
072	Pantanti	37,920
073	Pap	10,962
074	Pasi	426
075	Patial, Patikar, Patratanti, Patua	36,887
076	Rajna	455
077	Relli	5,917
078	Sabakhia	709
079	Samasi	1,483
080	Sanei	1,136
081	Sapari	121
082	Sauntiya, Santia	35,943
083	Sidhria	783
084	Sindhuria	131
085	Siyal, Khajuria	31,682
086	Tamadia	1,157
087	Tamudia	9,276
088	Tanla	68,988
089	Turi	12,134
090	Ujia	20,450
091	Valamiki, Valmiki	1,402
092	Mangali (in the districts of Koraput and Kalahandi)	1,214
093	Mirgan (in the district of Navrangpur)	2,168
Generic castes (those who identified as Dalit, Harijan, Anusuchit Jati, etc.)		2,57,670
		71,88,463

=== District wise ===
Districts		Scheduled Castes		
Districts	Population (2011)	Population	Percent	Top 3 largest (by pop)
Anugola	1,273,821	239,552	18.81	Pano (98,433); Kaibarta (28,774); Hari (26,972)
Balangir	1,648,997	294,777	17.88	Ganda (201,043); Kaibarta (45,670); Dhobi (14,453)
Baleshwar	2,320,529	478,586	20.62	Kandra (99,849); Pano (68,129); Gokha (65,929)
Baragada	1,481,255	298,780	20.17	Ganda (160,444); Kaibarta (58,419); Chamar (18,729)
Bhadrak	1,506,337	334,896	22.23	Pano (117,629); Gokha (82,689); Dhobi (38,466)
Boudh	441,162	104,934	23.78	Ganda (30,963); Kaibarta (24,600); Pano (20,797)
Debagada	312,520	52,112	16.67	Pano (20,539); Kaibarta (7,519); Dhobi (6,664)
Dhenkanal	1,192,811	234,070	19.62	Pano (115,814); Kaibarta (47,118); Hari (19,678)
Gajapati	577,817	39,175	6.78	Pano (11,469); Dhobi (5,249); Mala (3,704)
Ganjam	3,529,031	688,235	19.50	Bauri (143,903); Dhobi (134,681); Kaibarta (118,894)
Jagatsinghapur	1,136,971	248,152	21.83	Bauri (81,049); Kaibarta (51,169); Kandra (49,888)
Jajpur	1,827,192	433,387	23.72	Pano (201,562); Kandra (69,677); Kaibarta (36,327)
Jharsuguda	579,505	104,620	18.05	Ganda (48,640); Kaibarta (14,601); Chamar (13,822)
Kalahandi	1,576,869	286,580	18.17	Dom (238,280); Kaibarta (6,592); Ghasi (5,771)
Kandhamala	733,110	115,544	15.76	Pano (87,934); Hari (4,496); Ghasi (4,175)
Kataka	2,624,470	498,633	18.99	Kaibarta (106,982); Bauri (106,561); Pano (81,516)
Kendrapada	1,440,361	309,780	21.51	Kandra (129,116); Kaibarta (43,112); Dhobi (33,945)
Kendujhar	1,801,733	209,357	11.62	Pano (125,392); Dhobi (28,449); Dom (8,839)
Khordha	2,251,673	297,472	13.21	Kaibarta (84,124); Bauri (64,525); Dhobi (31,264)
Koraput	1,379,647	196,540	14.24	Dom (133,718); Katia (9,988); Ghasi (5,208)
Malkangiri	613,192	138,295	22.55	Namasudra (96,304); Dom (26,566); Katia (5,606)
Mayurbhanj	2,519,738	184,682	7.33	Pano (27,541); Patratanti (21,712); Dhobi (26,767)
Nabarangpur	1,220,946	177,384	14.53	Dom (69,491); Namasudra (38,901); Ganda (8,169)
Nayagada	962,789	136,399	14.17	Pano (53,220); Kaibarta (25,934); Dhobi (16,382)
Nuapada	610,382	82,159	13.46	Dom (45,049); Ganda (10,306); Chamar (7,659)
Puri	1,698,730	325,133	19.14	Bauri (109,628); Kaibarta (60,675); Bhoi (42,381)
Rayagada	967,911	139,514	14.41	Dom (105,707); Relli (3,742); Bauri (2,416)
Sambalpur	1,041,099	191,827	18.42	Ganda (71,093); Kaibarta (27,567); Ghasi (13,321)
Sonpur	610,183	156,219	25.60	Ganda (83,481); Kaibarta (43,232); Dhobi (8,834)
Sundaragada	2,093,437	191,660	9.15	Ganda (35,548); Pano (33,617); Kaibarta (15,963)
Total	41,974,218	71,88,463	17.13	Pano (1,205,099); Kaibarta (995,062); Dom (706,232)
