= Gokha (caste) =

Fishing community in Odisha

Gokha, also known as Gakha are a fishing community found in Odisha and are concentrated in the coastal districts of the state, particularly in the Balasore and its adjacing districts. They are recognized as Scheduled Castes in the state of Odisha, with a population of 2,12,718 as per 2011 census of India.

== Society ==
Historically, they have been in the lowest strata of the society and were considered inferior to other castes such as Khandayats and Karans. Though in the present times, they have been mobilised as voting block in Bhadrak and Balasore region. They are the 8th largest Scheduled Castes community in Odisha as per 2011 and are concentrated in the Central division of Odisha. They have a literacy rate of 72.03%.

== See also ==
- Kewat
- Jalia Kaibarta
