= AMDA-Nepal =

Geography
- Location: Damak-1, Jhapa, Nepal

Links
- Website: amda.org.np

AMDA-Nepal (Association of Medical Doctors of Asia-Nepal) is humanitarian, nonprofit-making, nonpolitical, non-sectarian, non-governmental organization working with its mission to promote the health and well-being of the underprivileged and marginalized people of Nepal.

== Objectives ==
- Initiate, promote and strengthen the country’s health services through national and international cooperation with principles of political non-alignment, equality and non-discrimination
- Facilitates medical doctors to enrich their professional expertise through mutual exchange of experience, research findings and standardization of services among themselves
- Establish coordination and functional relationship with other relevant national and international organizations, agencies or governments in carrying out its mission
- Accord priority to serve the communities that are more needy and/or are in immediate distress
