= Rangpuri language =

Indo-Aryan language spoken in India, Bangladesh, and Nepal

Rangpuri
- রংপুরী, কোচ-ৰাজবংশী, কামতা, কামতাপুৰী
- Various names of the Rangpuri language in the Bengali–Assamese and Devanagari scripts
- Pronunciation: [ɔŋpuɾiː] [ɔmpuɾiː] [kamt̪aː] [kamt̪apuɾiː] [kot͡ʃradʒbɔŋʃi]
- Native to: Bangladesh, India
- Region: North Bengal, Lower Assam
- Ethnicity: Rajbongshi, Bengali, Deshi, Nashya Shaikh, Assamese
- Native speakers: 10 million (2007)
- Language family: Indo-European: Indo-Iranian; Indo-Aryan; Eastern; Odia–Bengali–Assamese; Bengali–Assamese; Kamrupa; Kamta; Central–Eastern Kamta; Rangpuri
- Writing system: Bengali-Assamese script

Official status
- Official language in: India: West Bengal (additional)

Language codes
- ISO 639-3: rkt
- Glottolog: rang1265 Central-Eastern Kamta rang1272 Rangpuri (Bangladesh) kamt1243 Kamta (India) bahe1242 Bahe
- This is a map of the KRDS lect, with the Rangpuri/Kamtapuri-speaking area shown in the Extended Central region.

- Rangpuri is classified as Vulnerable by the UNESCO Atlas of the World's Languages in Danger

Rangpuri (Rangpuri: অংপুরি, romanized: Ôṅgpuri, pronounced [ɔŋpuɾiː] or Rangpuri: অমপুরি, romanized: Ômpuri, pronounced [ɔmpuɾiː]), also known in India as Kamtapuri (Rangpuri: কামতা, romanized: Kāmtā, pronounced [kamt̪aː] or Rangpuri: কামতাপুৰী, romanized: Kāmtāpuri, pronounced [kamt̪apuɾiː]) is an eastern Indo-Aryan language of the Bengali-Assamese branch, spoken in Rangpur Division in Bangladesh, northern West Bengal and western Goalpara of Assam in India. Many Rangpuri or Kamta speakers are bilingual in Bengali and Assamese in their respective regions. According to Glottolog, it forms the Central-Eastern Kamta group. Together with Goalpariya/Deshi, Kayort, Rajbanshi and Surjapuri, they form the KRDS group of languages.

== Names ==
Rangpuri goes by numerous names, the most common being Bahe, though Deshi bhasha and Anchalit bhasha are also used.

== Comparison with related languages and dialects ==
English	Kamarupi		Rarhi	Vangiya		
English	Kamtapuri	Standard Assamese	Standard Bengali	Sylheti	Jessore-Khulnaiya Bengali	Dhakaiya Bengali
I do	Muĩ korong	Moe korü̃/korönɡ	Ami kori	Ami/Mui xorí	Ami kori	Ami kori
I am doing	Muĩ korir dhorichung	Moe kori asü̃/asöng	Ami korchhi	Ami/Mui xoriar/xorram	Ami kortisi	Ami kortasi
I did	Muĩ korisong	Moe korisü̃/korisöng	Ami korechhi	Ami/mui xor(i)si	Ami korsi	Ami korsi
I did (perfective)	Muĩ korilung	Moe korilü̃/korilöng	Ami korlam	Ami/Mui xorlam	Ami kôrlam	Ami kôrlam
I did (distant)	Muĩ korisilung	Moe korisilü̃/korisilong	Ami korechhilam	Ami/Mui xors(i)lam	Ami korsilam	Ami korsilam
I was doing	Muĩ koria asilung	Moe kori asilü̃/asilöng	Ami korchhilam	Ami/Mui xorat aslam	Ami kortesilam	Ami kortasilam
I will do	Muĩ korim	Moe korim	Ami korbo	Ami/Mui xormu	Ami kormu/korbani	Ami kormu
I will be doing	Muĩ koria thakim	Moe kori thakim	Ami korte thakbo	Ami/Mui xorat táxmu	Ami korti thakmu/thakbani	Ami korte thakmu

== Sample text ==
The following text is Article 1 of the Universal Declaration of Human Rights, written in Rangpuri:

=== Romanisation ===
Gôṭe loklā mān ār ôdhikārer ādhārôt jônmojāto shôtôntro ār sômān hôce. Āmāhālār buddhi ār bicār lie āsāl rôhce ār æk āpôsôt bhaibhair bæbôhār korubā lāge.

=== Bengali-Assamese script ===
গটে লোকলা মান আর অধিকারের ধারৎ জনমজাত স্বতন্ত্র আর সমান হচে। আমাহালার বুদ্ধি আর বিচার লিএ আসাল রহচে আর আ্যক আপসৎ ভাইভাইর ববিহার করুবা লাগে।

=== Devanagari script ===
गटे लोकला मान आर अधिकारेर आधारत् जन्मजात स्वतन्त्र आर समान हचे। अमाहालार बुद्धि आर बिचार लिए आसाल रहचे आर एक आपसत् भाइभाइर ब्यबहार करुबा लागे।

=== English ===
All human beings are born free and equal in dignity and rights. They are endowed with reason and conscience and should act towards one another in a spirit of brotherhood.

== See also ==
- Sylheti language
- Assamese language
- Maithili language
