= KRDS lects =

Indo-Aryan variety from eastern Indian subcontinent

- KRNB (Kamta, Rajbanshi and Northern Bangla) lects Kamatapuri • Kamta
- Native to: India, Bangladesh, Nepal
- Region: Northern West Bengal, Western Assam, North Eastern Bihar, Northern Bangladesh, Southeast Nepal
- Ethnicity: Rajbanshi, Surjapuri, Bengali, Assamese, Nashya Shaikh, Deshi, Kewat
- Language family: Indo-European: Indo-Iranian; Indo-Aryan; Eastern; Odia–Bengali–Assamese; Bengali–Assamese; Kamrupa; KRDS lects
- Dialects: Kewat, Rajbanshi/Tajpuriya, Rangpuri/Kamtapuri, Deshi, Surjapuri, Dhekri

Language codes
- ISO 639-3: Variously: kyv – Kayort or Kewat rjs – Rajbanshi rkt – Rangpuri/Kamtapuri sjp – Surjapuri
- Glottolog: kamt1242

A map showing the linguistic varieties of the KRDS lects.

The speakers are distributed unevenly, as shown in the map.

The proto-languages of the eastern Magadhan languages. Kamarupa Prakrit corresponds to ?proto-Kamarupa here, a hitherto un-reconstructed proto-language. The period corresponds to earlier than 1250 CE, when proto-Kamta began to innovate unique features.

The KRDS lects (or the Kamta, Rajbanshi, Deshi and Surjapuri subgroup) are a cluster of modern lects that are phylogenetic descendants of the proto-Kamta language. The proto-Kamta language began differentiating after 1250 around Kamatapur (present-day Gosanimari), the capital city of Kamata kingdom, as the western branch of the Kamarupi Prakrit, whereas the eastern branch developed into Early Assamese. Since the 16th century the proto-Kamta community has fragmented giving rise to the differentiated modern lects. The modern lects are: Goalpariya/Deshi (Assam), Kamta (Assam and West Bengal), Kayort/Kewat (Nepal), Rangpuri (Bangladesh), Rajbanshi/Tajpuriya (Nepal) and Surjapuri (Bihar).

These modern lects could be categorised into three groups: western, central and eastern. Unlike the Assamese, Bengali, Hindi and Nepali languages which were standardised and propagated in the 19th and 20th centuries, the KRDS lects were not standardised. As a result, the KRDS lects became diglossic vernaculars to these standard varieties and acquired phonological and morphological features from them.

Nevertheless, two standards are emerging within the KRDS lects: a central Jhapa variety targeting speakers in Nepal, and an eastern Cooch Behar variety targeting speakers in northern West Bengal and western Assam.

== Proto-Kamta ==
The development of proto-Kamta (also called proto-Kamata) was the result of Sandhya, a ruler of Kamarupa Nagara (present-day North Guwahati), Kamrup moving his capital to Kamatapur (present-day Gosanimari) and establishing the Kamata kingdom, thus carrying the native language along with.

== Socio-linguistic communities ==
The modern KRNB lects are spoken primarily in western Assam, northern West Bengal, northern Bangladesh, north-eastern Bihar and south-eastern Nepal.
