= Moner Phool =

- Directed by: Robin Chandra Roy
- Written by: Robin Chandra Roy
- Produced by: Robin Chandra Roy
- Starring: Suman Roy; Tikli Roy; Jublee Roy; Bishal Roy
- Cinematography: Dewan Jahangir Alam
- Edited by: Dewan Jahangir Alam
- Production company: R C R Production Dhubri
- Release date: 15 February 2016
- Running time: 3 minutes
- Country: India
- Language: Rajbongshi
- Budget: 25,000

Moner Phool (Assamese: মনৰ ফুল) is a 2016 Indian Koch Rajbongshi language drama children's video film, written and directed by Robin Chandra Roy. Under banner of R C R production. The film stars Suman, Tikli, Bishal and Jublee.

== Cast ==
- Suman Roy as Suman
- Tikli Roy as Suman's sister
- Jublee Roy as Suman's sister
- Bishal Roy as Student
