= Keota =

Keota may refer to:

Towns in the United States

- Keota, Colorado
- Keota, Iowa
- Keota, Missouri
- Keota, Oklahoma

Towns in Bangladesh

- Keota, Bangladesh

Towns in India

- Keota, Hooghly

== See also ==
- Kaivarta (disambiguation), India-related terms also rendered as Keot
