= Siyal =

Siyal may refer to:

- Siyal Islands, an archipelago in the Red Sea disputed between Egypt and Sudan
- Siyal, Pakistan
- Siyal (tribe), a Punjabi clan
- Siyal (Odisha caste), in Odisha
