= Pathibhara FM =

Radio station based in Damak, Jhapa District, Nepal

Pathibhara FM is a radio station in Nepal, based in Damak, Jhapa District. It broadcasts at 93.6mhz.

== Website ==
www.pathibharafm.org
