= Bhoi =

Caste in Odisha, India

The Bhoi (also known as Bauri) is an ethnic community found in Odisha, India, who speak the Odia language. They are classified as Scheduled castes in Odisha. Traditionally, they are blowers of conch shells (Shankha) in Hindu rituals, and work as agricultural labourers.

In Gujarat and Maharashtra, their traditional occupations included acting as palanquin-bearers.

The Bhoi are also found in Assam.

"Bhoi" or "Bhoimul" was also a functional title provided to writers of Odisha belonging to Karan community. They were highly educated and an elite community completely different from Bhoi/Bauri. Karan community has its own dynasty and ruled Odisha by "Bhoimula" dynasty of Karana community.
