= Damak Municipality =

Damak दमक
- Municipality (नगरपालिका)
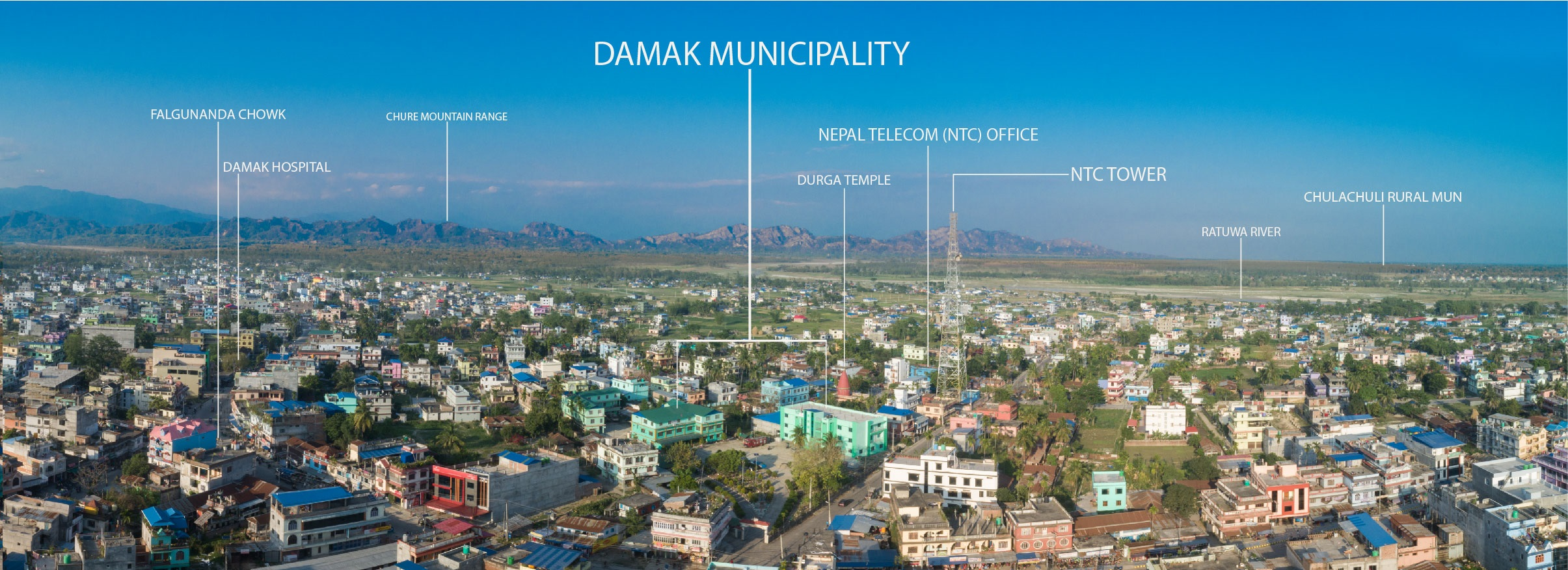
- Damak Ghar
- Motto: "Green City, Prosperous Damak" "हरित नगर समृद दमक"
- Location in Koshi Province Damak (Nepal)
- Coordinates: 26.66°N 87.70°E
- Country: Nepal
- Province: Koshi
- District: Jhapa
- Subdivisions: 10 Wards

Government
  - Mayor: Ram Kumar Thapa (RPP)
  - Deputy Mayor: Regina Bhattarai Prasai (NC)

Area
  - Total: 75.74 km^{2} (29.24 sq mi)
- Elevation: 71 m (233 ft)

Population (2022)
  - Total: 107,410
  - Density: 1,418/km^{2} (3,673/sq mi)
- Time zone: UTC+5:45 (NST)
- Postal code: 57217
- Area code: 023
- Website: damakmun.gov.np

Damak (Nepali: दमक) is one of the oldest municipalities in Jhapa District of Koshi Province in eastern Nepal. It is situated between the Ratuwa River in the east and the Maawa River in the west. It has Sivalik Hills in its north and ends with the intersection of Ratuwa River and Maawa River in the south. Mahendra Highway, the longest highway of Nepal, bisects the municipality. It had a population of 107,410 in 2021.

== Demographics ==
At the time of the 2011 Nepal census, Damak Municipality had a population of 75,743. Of these, 65.0% spoke Nepali, 19.2% Limbu, 11.3% Maithili, 4.6% Dhimal, 4.1% Rai, 2.9% Newar, 2.5% Tamang, 1.5% Magar, 0.9% Hindi, 0.8% Rajbanshi, 0.7% Urdu, 0.5% Gurung, 0.4% Bengali, 0.4% Bantawa, 0.4% Tharu, 0.3% Bhojpuri, 0.3% Majhi, 0.3% Rajasthani, 0.3% Santali, 0.3% Sunwar, 0.2% Kisan, 0.2% Kumal, 0.1% Bhujel, 0.1% Chamling, 0.1% Sherpa, 0.1% Tajpuriya, 0.1% Thulung, 0.1% Uranw/Urau, 0.1% Yakkha and 0.6% other languages as their first language.

In terms of ethnicity/caste, 23.3% were Hill Brahmin, 20.5% Chhetri, 10.6% Limbu, 6.9% Rai, 4.9% Dhimal, 5.2% Newar, 3.9% Kami, 3.2% Tamang, 3.0% Damai/Dholi, 2.2% Magar, 1.4% Musalman, 1.3% Teli, 1.1% Gharti/Bhujel, 1.0% Kumal, 1.0% Tharu, 0.9% Rajbanshi, 0.8% Gurung, 0.8% Majhi, 0.6% Sarki, 0.5% Jhangad/Dhagar, 0.5% Marwadi, 0.5% Sanyasi/Dasnami, 0.4% Bengali, 0.4% Dev Pranami (Poudar), 0.4% Satar/Santal, 0.4% Sunuwar, 0.4% other Terai, 0.3% Hajjam/Thakur, 0.3% Kalwar, 0.2% Terai Brahmin, 0.2% Dhanuk, 0.2% Dom, 0.2% Halwai, 0.1% Chamar/Harijan/Ram, 0.1% other Dalit, 0.1% Dhobi, 0.1% other Janajati, 0.1% Kayastha, 0.1% Khawas, 0.1% Koiri/Kushwaha, 0.1% Kurmi, 0.1% Lohar, 0.1% Mallaha, 0.1% Musahar, 0.1% Rajput, 0.1% Sherpa, 0.1% Sonar, 0.1% Sudhi, 0.1% Tajpuriya, 0.1% Thakuri, 0.3% Yadav, 0.1% Yakkha and 0.4% others.

In terms of religion, 70.7% were Hindu, 16.6% Kirati, 4.9% Buddhist, 3.5% Prakriti, 2.7% Christian, 1.3% Musalman and 0.3% others.

In terms of literacy, 82.0% could read and write, 1.7% could only read and 16.3% could neither read nor write.

Damak is one of the oldest municipalities in the Eastern Nepal. It is home to many ex-Gurkha who served in the Nepali, Indian and British Military.

== Landscape information ==
Damak was changed to a municipality from a VDC (Village Development Committee) in 1981 AD. The Damak municipality consists of 10 wards, with the previous 19 wards rearranged and some wards were merged. Himalayan tea estate (हिमालय गूडरिक) where the former royal family has invested and a palace was built for the ex King and Queen where palace also build for stay of Royal families. The municipality covers an area of 7,513 hectares and is at an average of 100 meters above sea level. Lakhanpur is to the east, Urlabari, Rajghat and Madhumalla is in the west and Chulachuli (Ilam) and Kohabhara VDC in the north and the south, respectively.

According to the census of 2011, Damak had 7,178 households containing about 36,000 people. The total area is 7,513 hectares out of which 1406.7 hectares is covered by residential area whereas 5,586.30 hectares is used for agriculture. The market area consists of 400.00 hectares, 215 hectares as forest plant area and 265.00 hectares is used in other purposes.

The biggest cattle market of in Koshi Province is located in Damak ward no. 7 Pashuhat (पशुहाट).

== Education ==
According to 2001 Nepal census, literacy rate of the city is 88%.

School Data

- Primary – 1038
- Lower Secondary – 700
- Secondary – 1408
- Technical School Under CTEVT – 490
- Higher Secondary – 1500
- Affiliated Campus – 9

== Communication and entertainment ==
Nepal Telecom Damak Branch serves as the center for telecommunication and cellular with two huge Skyline Towers. Whereas Axiatas's Ncell is also popular in the city having 82 small and one huge tower installed for the fastest connectivity. There are two cellular providers in Damak; Ncell and NTC. Here, all cellular providers deliver 4G services in Damak.

Worldlink Communication, Subisu, Vianet, Firstlink, Unified Communication and Classictech are Internet Service Provider (ISP) which are providing internet services in Damak.

Damak has six FM stations named Pathibhara FM (93.6 MHz), Saptarangi FM (101.6 MHz), Radio Himshikhar (103.3Mhz), Star FM (92Mhz), Radio Jhapa (100.7Mhz), and Radio Kings FM (104.1Mhz). But national radio station Radio Nepal and other surrounding FM stations Kanchanjungha FM, Saptakoshi FM, Koshi FM, Kantipur FM can clearly be heard in the city. Damak is also broadcasting the television channel named Himshikhar Television from a couple of years and running successfully in the nationwide. There used to be two TV DTH providers named National cable and another Kankai cable (which later merged with National cable and started its services with the name Jagriti National Cable and later named as Doen TV (2017) and Mero TV (2019)) in Damak. SIM TV are also started to provide the DTH services, and later Dish Home also started a services in Damak.

There are 3 single movie hall named Pathibhara Chalchitra Mandir, Nilkantha Hall (closed) and Damak Chalchitra Mandir (closed) and DMAX Cinema is multiplex where movies can be watched.
