= Jhalo Malo =

Fishing community of Bengal region

Jhalo Malo, also known as Jhalo or Malo are fishing community present in Bangladesh and West Bengal in India. They are primarily engaged in work of fishing, baoting and agricultural labourers. Due to their traditional profession of fishing and labourers, they are recognized as Scheduled Castes in West Bengal and Northeastern states of Assam, Meghalaya and Mizoram.

== History ==
The community derives its naam from two words, "Jhalo" which refers to Jaal (net) used to catch fishers and later word "Malo" referring to Malloh or Mallah (boatsman). The term was used to derive their occupation of fisherman and boatsman in the Bengal region. The community was primarily concentrated in the Ganges Delta and Brahmaputra Valley in Assam and Bangladesh, later the terminology was used to denote the fishermen and baotsmen community of region as a whole. They were often confused as clubbed with other communities with similar profession, such as Nishads and Jalia Kaibarta.

During the Partition of Bengal and subsequent period, the community which was primarily based in Bangladesh has settled in Assam with other Bengali Hindus in Assam.

== Current circumstances ==
Majority of the community members are Hindus. They were historically remained distanced from education and were considered as bottom in the hierarchy of caste system, and faced discrimination and untouchabity.

As of 2011, their population was primarily in West Bengal with total of 3,03,618 and in Assam with 80,376.

== Bibliography ==
- Singh, K S (1993). The Scheduled Castes. Anthropological Survey of India.
