= Thakur Panchanan =

Indian reformer (1866–1935)

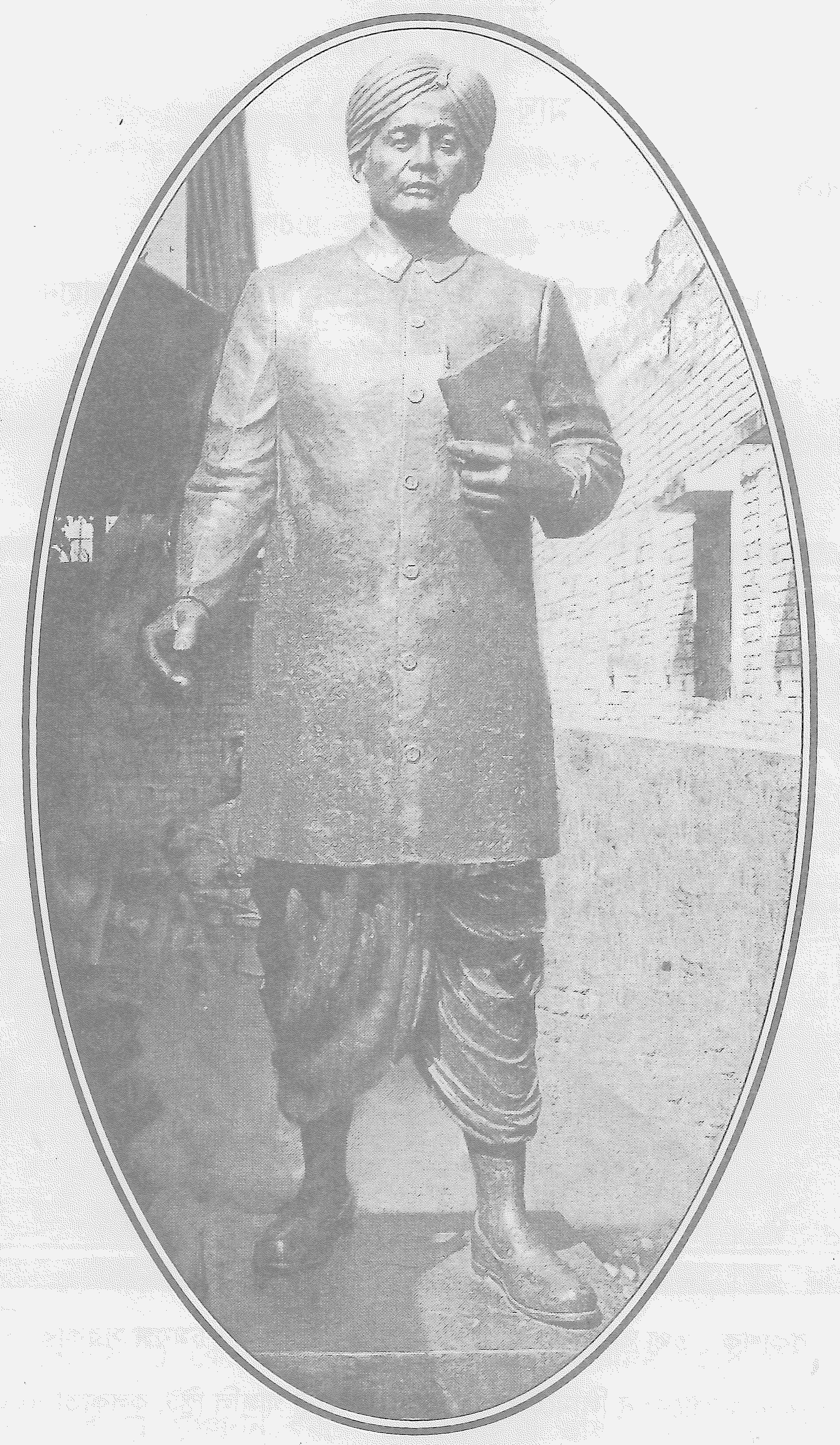
- Born: 14 February 1866; Khalisamari Village, Mathabhanga, Cooch Behar State, British India (present day West Bengal, India)
- Died: 9 September 1935 (aged 69); Calcutta, Bengal, British India (present day Kolkata, West Bengal, India)
- Education: University of Calcutta (M.A., LL.B.)
- Occupation: Social reformer
- Known for: Upliftment of the Rajbanshi (Koch) community.
- Parents: Khoshal Sarkar (father); Champala Sarkar (mother)

Thakur Panchanan (14 February 1866 – 9 September 1935), also known as Panchanan Barma or Panchanan Sarkar, was an Indian jotedar landlord, founder of Barma Company and social reformer in the erstwhile princely state of Cooch Behar, British Raj. He established an organisation called the Kshatriya Sabhā for the Rajbongshi people to Brahminise their practices for social upliftment and the improvement of their caste status. He received recognition and honors from the British administration after he aided them in recruitment during World War I by encouraging Rajbongshi youths to join the army to show their Kshatriya valor and was elected to the Bengal Legislative Assembly. In modern times, he is sometimes incorrectly thought of as a "ruler" or "king".

== Early life and education ==
Panchanan Barma was born on 14 February 1866 in a middle-class jotedar family at Khalisamari village of Mathabhanga subdivision, in erstwhile Cooch Behar state. He was the son of Khoshal Sarkar (father) and Champala Sarkar (mother). His father sent him to a Middle-English high school, named Mathabhanga High School for education. After passing Middle English examination from the Mathabhanga High School, he took admission into the Jenkins High School for further education and passed the High English examination. He completed his graduation in 1893 from the Victoria College (present Acharya Brojendra Nath Seal College) --then affiliated to the University of Calcutta, with a honours in Sanskrit. Later he completed his MA in Sanskrit (postgraduation degree) and LL.B (Bachelor of Laws) degree in 1897 and 1900 respectively from the University of Calcutta.

He was the first M.A. and LL.B in the Rajbanshi community of not only the state of Cooch Behar but of the whole North Bengal, Assam, and Bihar.

== Work ==
=== Barma company ===
He built up a financial organization, named Barma Company at Ganibandha in the Rangpur district (present-day Bangladesh) with the claim that their basic aim was to protect the poor peasants from the landlord and moneylenders by providing loans at better interest rates. It was renamed Kshatriya Bank in 1920–21.

Under his leadership, more than three hundred well-coordinated clusters of villages (Gram Mandali) were formed in the Rangpur locality through the company. He had claimed that his aims was to restructure the village economy in a way such that they would be able to meet all their needs.

=== Women's empowerment ===
He is considered to be a social reformer and one of the advocates for women empowerment in the Bengal. He is known to have participated in the debate about the Voting Right for women in the Bengal Legislative Assembly in 1921.

During 1921–23, he established an organization, named Nari Raksha Upasamiti, for the protection of women. Through this organization, he wanted to make the women self-dependent by providing them modern education and physical training in stick-play, wrestling, etc.

He also wrote a poem, named Dang Dhari Mao, where he encouraged youths to stand up against any wrong and injustice against women. His Khatriya Samiti also took efforts to bring back abducted women. Because of frequent incidents of female abduction, physical training using stick and daggers became popular among the Rajbanshi women.

== Kshtriyasation movement ==
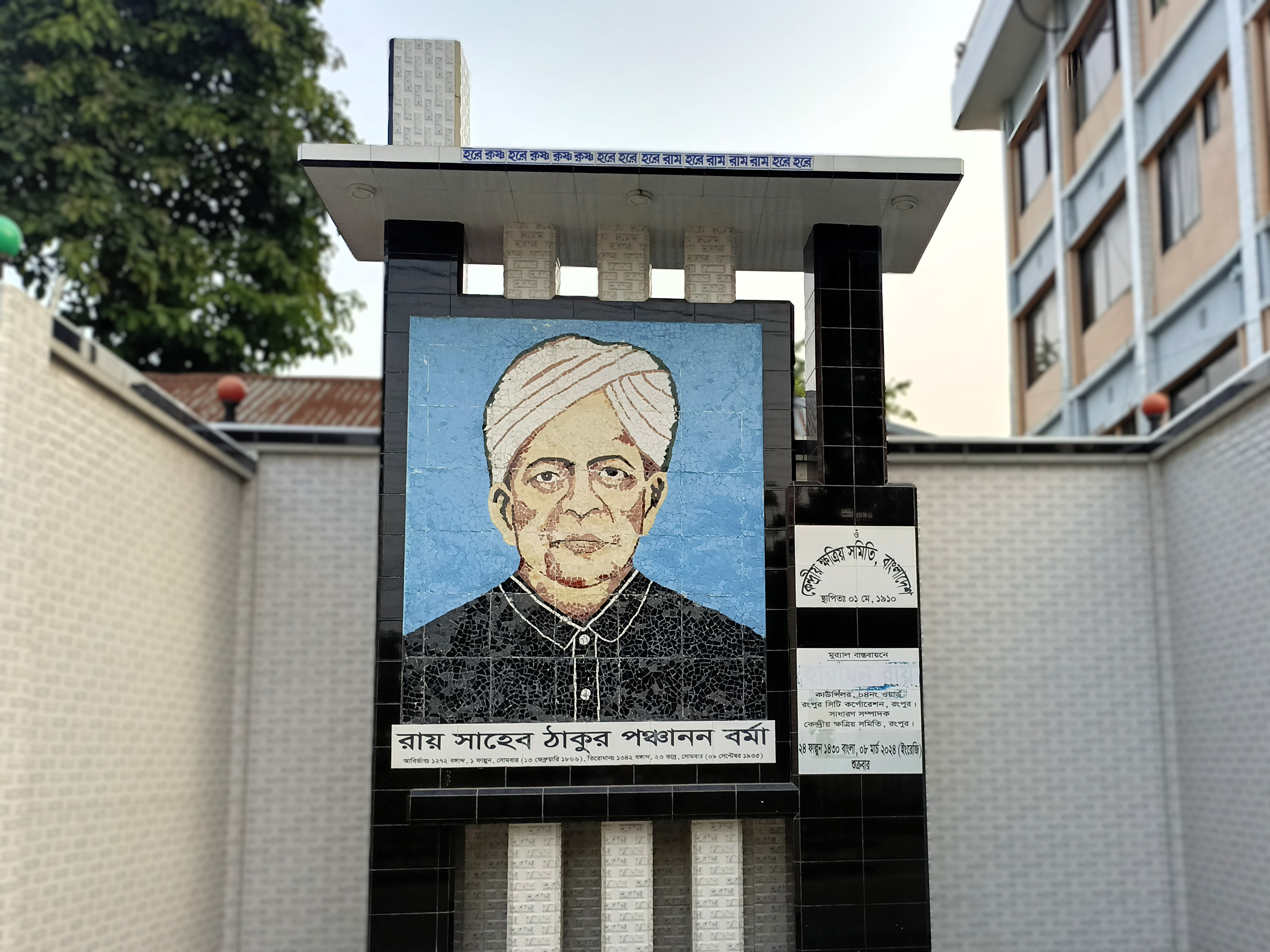
Portrait of Panchanan Barma at the central office of the Kshatriya Samiti in Rangpur

At the dawn of the nineteenth century, caste pride was very strong among the upper-caste Hindus. The position of Rajbanshi was not respectable in the society and they faced insults and humiliations from the upper-caste Hindus. Consequently, this community developed a sense of alienation and a spirit of community solidarity. Rajbanshi Movement of Kshatriyaisation was first started in 1891 when the government tried to include Rajbanshis and Koch in the same caste category. Under the leadership of Sri Harimohon Roy Khajanchi, the Rajbanshi started their first Kshatriya movement against the census officials and claimed that they are actually Kshatriya. They claimed that they are originally from Kshatriya varna and they left their homeland because of the fear of annihilation by a Brahmin sage Parashurama. They even gave up their sacred thread in order to hide their identity and took shelter in a region, named Poundradesh, which is currently the districts of Rangpur, Dinajpur, Cooch Behar, and their adjacent areas. They also gave up the Vedic rituals followed by the Kshatriya community to hide their identity and started living with the local people. Gradually they became known as Bhanga Kshatriya or Bratya Kshatriya and their caste name Rajbanshi also implies the same. Under the guidance of Sri Harimohon Roy Khajanchi, Rangpur Bratya Kshatriya Jatir Unnati Bidhayani Sabha was established for the development of Koch community. They submitted a protest letter to the district magistrate of Rangpur urging him to recognize Rajbanshis as a separate caste from the original ethnic identity Koch and allow them to enroll their caste as Kshatriya in the census. The district magistrate then asked local pandits and Dharma Sabha for their opinion in this regard. After a prolonged Dharma Sabha meeting, pandits opined that Koches were Kshatriya but fallen from the position because of non-observance of the Vedic rituals of the Kshatriya community. Thus they should be considered as Bratya Kshatriya. District magistrate of Rangpur accepted their opinion and ordered that Rajbanshis would be permitted to refer themselves as Bratya Kshatriya. In this way, the Kshatriya movement of 1891 came to a halt.

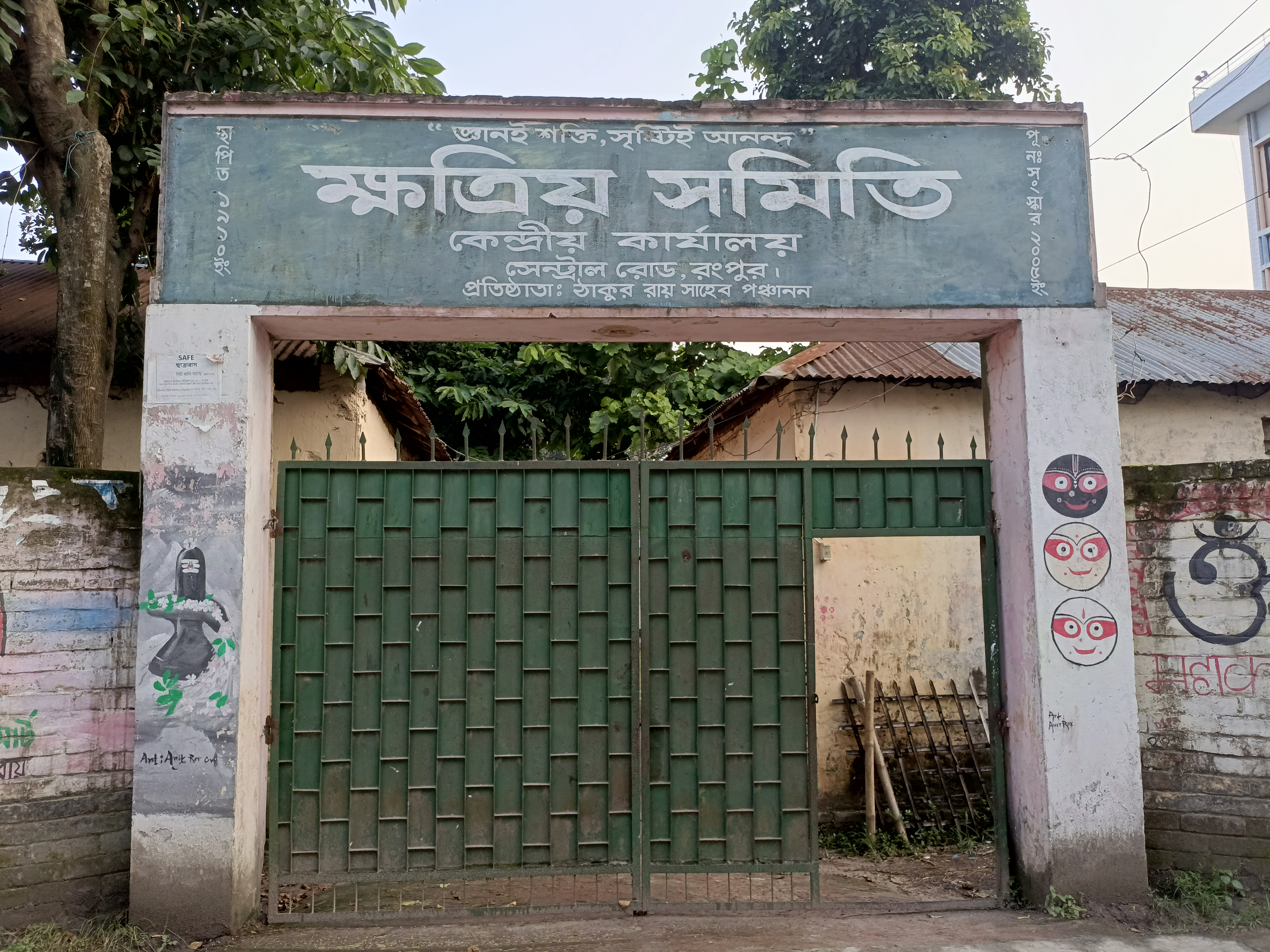
Kshatriya Samiti, Rangpur

After passing the Law examination, Panchanan started practising law at the Rangpur court in 1901. At that time, law was a thriving business in India and Rangpur was one of the major centres for Law. However, he noticed that most of his fellow lawyers were from the upper-caste Hindu community, almost no one from the backward-class community. He faced many insults in his workplace because of his backward class Rajbanshi background. One day, he went to the court by taking his fellow upper-caste lawyer's toga (lawyer's gown) mistakenly. When he understood his mistake, he went to return it to the lawyer. The lawyer refused to accept that toga, stating I hate to use a toga used by a lower-class Rajbanshi. He was seriously hurt by the behaviour of his fellow lawyer. With this event, he understood the ground reality of the casteist Hindu society of that time. He also understood the social status of his own Rajbanshi community in the Hindu society of that time. At that time, many marginalized and backward communities of India started to form their own associations to protect the interest of their own community. He also then worried for his own Rajbanshi community and wanted to develop his community. In the census of 1901, again Rajbanshis were included in the same caste category of the Koch community and had not been given the Kshatriya status. He now took up the leadership of Rajbanshis. Under his leadership, Rajbanshis started a vigorous Kshatriyaisation movement with new enthusiasm for social justice.

He believed that nobody will give them Kshatriya status unless they achieve that in their own right. He started his campaign by stating Rajbanshis were of royal lineage and they were different from the Koch community. Under his leadership, the Kshatriyaisation Movement spread throughout North Bengal. Many Rajbanshis started to wear sacred threads (also known as upabita or paita) like the Kshatriya community. They even started to follow Vedic ritual rules of the Kshatriya community. However, upper-caste Hindu society strongly opposed this movement and was not ready to accept Rajbanshis as Kshatriyas. Even many landlords, scholars, royal officials of the Cooch Behar royal court were against this movement. Many upper-caste Brahmins also refused to serve Rajbanshi people in their religious and social ceremonies. However, Mithila, Kamrup, and some local Brahmins strongly supported and participated in their movement. In the meanwhile, some enthusiastic Rajbanshis started to collect history, proverbs, songs, and popular folktales to establish their Kshatriya identity on a firm footing.

In 1906, he attended the provincial conference of the Indian National Congress at Barisal and came in touch with many prominent congress leaders of that time. He associated himself with the Indian National Congress and tried to solve different problems of his own backward community. However, he soon realized the rigid attitude of the upper-caste Calcutta based congress leaders and understood that they will never help him in the social developmental work. He felt that in order to be respected and accepted by the upper-class Hindu society, Rajbanshis must have to be educated and organized. He and other Rajbanshi leaders decided to form a platform for this purpose. A conference was held on 1 May 1910 in the Rangpur town. As a result of that conference, the Kshatriya Samiti (also known as Kshatriya Sabhā) was established for the overall development of his own Rajbanshi community. In that conference, it was also decided that they will convey their demands and grievances to the British government by submitting a memorandum. In January 1911, a memorandum signed by more than two thousand Rajbanshis was given to the Lieutenant Generals of Assam and Bengal. Finally, Rajbanshi leaders succeeded. In the Census Report of 1911, Rajbanshis were included as a separate Hindu caste, named Rajbanshi, with Kshatriya in a bracket.

In the following years, newly established Kshatriya Sabhā led a strong Kshatriyaisation movement among the Rajbanshi community. His association (samity) tried to restore the past glorious heritage of the Rajbanshi Kshatriyas and tried to develop them on the socio-economic front. They also contacted other Kshatriyas and Rajputs of North and Western India for the purpose of unity among the Kshatriya people. In the third annual conference of the Kshatriya Samiti, he announced the ceremony of upabita (sacred thread) for the Rajbanshis. They also asked for the opinion of Hindu pandits in this regard. Hindu pandits opined that Rajbanshis were Kshatriyas and they can wear the sacred thread. In 1913, his association first arranged a Mahamilan Ceremony at Porolbari in Debiganj on the bank of river Korotaya. In this ceremony, Rajbanshis took Kshatriyatwa by wearing a sacred thread (upabita) in the presence of many renowned scholars who came from different parts of India such as Nabadwip, Kolkata, Kamrup, etc. Later Kshatriya Samiti organized many sacred thread-wearing ceremonies (Milankshetras) in different districts of Bengal and Assam. Brahminical rituals of wearing sacred thread Upabita (also known as Upanayana ceremony) were performed to convert thousands of Rajbanshi to ‘Kshatriya Rajbanshi’ in the villages of North Bengal. Few people from other marginalized communities also converted to Rajbanshi Kshatriya in the converting process.

During the Census of 1921, Khatriya Samiti again organized Rajbanshis and appealed the census authorities to enroll them as only Kshatriya instead of Rajbanshi Kshatriya. Their demand was accepted and finally his Rajbanshi community received Kshatriya status in the 1921 census.

== British support and entry in electoral politics ==
When the first world war began in 1914, the British government appealed to Indians to join the war. No Indian national leaders of that time came forward to help the British government for this purpose. However, Panchanan appealed to Rajbanshi youths to join the battlefield with the British to show their heroism or kshatriyatwa. The British government also launched some societal reforms in India during the war period to encourage the Indian youths to join the war. During this period, Panchanan also understood that the Rajbanshi community will not progress much on the socio-economic front without education. In 1917, he sent a letter to the British Indian government asking for reforms in Bengal. He stressed more on the educational reforms as well as societal reforms in his letter. During that time, most of the backward peoples of the North Bengal area were from the Rajbanshi or Muslim community. On the other hand, zamindars and money-lenders were from the upper-caste Hindu society. He organized these backward sections of the society against the upper-caste zamindars and worked for them. He along with other Rajbanshi social leaders also took the initiative to promote education among the Rajbanshi society. His Kshatriya Samiti provided financial help to the needy students of the community. He gained huge support for his activity from the backward sections of society. He became the undisputed political leader of the backward community in the North Bengal area. In 1919, the British government conferred him the Rai Sahib title for his societal reform and the MBE (Member of British Empire) for sending the Rajbanshi troops in the First World War. In this way, he became the Rai Sahib Panchanan Barma, MBE.

After the First World War, the British government undertook many reforms in the Indian administration system under the Government of India Act 1919. The British government aimed to introduce self-governing institutions gradually in British India. Dual-mode of provincial governance- named as Reserved and Transferred, was also introduced under this act. British provincial governors were supposed to control the reserved subjects which include justice, police, land revenue, and irrigation. On the other hand, elected Indian provincial ministers were supposed to control the transferred subjects which include local self-government, public health, education, agriculture, fishery, and forest. For the purpose of rural development, the Union Board was established under this Act. Right of Voting was also granted to Indians who paid a certain minimum amount of taxes to the government. Many people from the backward Rajbanshi and Muslim communities also won the Right of Voting. He used his Khatriya Samiti as a political platform for political protest. Seeing his rise in the Indian political scenario, national leaders became worried. In the general election of 1920, he won a landslide victory from Rangpur. He was inducted into the Bengal Legislative Assembly after winning the general election. He now used his political power as well as Kshatriya Samiti to improve the life of the backward communities.

== Later life and legacy ==
Cooch Behar king always opposed the Kshatriya Movement and never cooperated with the Kshatriya Samiti. They also tried to disrupt different Milankshetras within the Cooch Behar state. In 1926, Panchanan was banished from the Cooch Behar state. It was also ordered that he would not be able to enter Cooch Behar state without special permission.

In 2012, the West Bengal government has established a university, named Cooch Behar Panchanan Barma University, for higher education. The name of the university commemorates his legacy. He died in Kolkata on 9 September 1935. On 1 December 2020, the Government of West Bengal declared school holiday on the birthday of Panchanan Barma, stating:

It has been decided that there will be a holiday henceforth under the order of State Government on occasion of the Birthday of Thakur Panchanan Barma which falls on 1st day of Phalgun in every Bengali Year corresponding to 13th/ 14th February
