= Brittial Bania =

Ethnic community in India

The Brittial Bania is an ethnic community in Assam, India. The group traces its roots to a merchant community who reached Assam (Kamarupa) in ancient times. Unlike the mainland Baniya community, this community of Assam is recognized as a Scheduled Caste by the government of India.

== Origin ==
Chand Sadagar, who was a Merchant ("Bania" in Assamese), is believed to be the ancient ancestor of the ethnic Bania community of Assam. He was a rich and powerful river and sea merchant of Champak Nagar, Bengal who lived between 200 and 300 AD. Narayan Dev gave an account in his Manasamangal about the merchant ship of the trader Chand Saudagar proceeding to the sea from ancient Champaknagar passing through Saptagram and Tribeni, the tri-junction of the Ganges, Saraswati and Jamuna River.

== Medieval history ==
During the medieval Period, most of the people from the Bania community accepted Vaishnavism under the patronage of Srimanta Sankardeva. Hari Das Baniya, a prominent Vaishnav Saint during the 16th-century, was a devotee and a very close disciple of Srimanta Sankardeva. Hari Das Bania Ata later took patronage at the Barpeta Satra although he originally belonged to Nagaon. He played a significant role in the Vaishnav movement led by Srimanta Samkardeva. The Bania people like the Kaibarta were considered lower class by the Kayastha and Brahmin community of Assam during the medieval period. This system is still prevalent in some parts of Assam.

== Post-Colonisation era ==
During the late 1880s, Sjt. Sonadhar Senapati, who was a well educated Assamese man and was working in a good position at the Assam Secretariat at Shillong, represented the problems of the oppressed castes and tribes of Assam in front of the British. During the meeting he met Mr. Mahi Miri who represented the Mising Tribe in the meeting. Sonadhar Senapati was impressed with the Charming personality of Mr. Mahi Miri. Sonadhar Senapati, breaking all the stereotypes of the society during that time, arranged his daughter's (Indira Senapati's) marriage with Mr. Mahi Miri who later became the Chief Conservator of Kaziranga National Park. Sonadhar Senapati was also the founder of Asom Bania Sabha, a Dalit organization of Assam during the early period of 19th Century.

It was under the leadership of Sonadhar Senapati, that these indigenous communities from the Brahmaputra Valley were inserted in the Schedule Caste category by the Govt. of India. Indira Senapati alias Indira Miri is also one of the famous personalities of the Assamese Bania community. Indira Miri, who did her master's degree at University of Edinburgh, UK during that time, was appointed as the Chief Education Officer of NEFA with her base at Sadiya, a small Assamese town, and worked among the tribals for ten years. During the earthquake of 1950, Miri and her fellow teachers were known to have worked to bring relief to the people of the region. She resigned from NEFA service in 1957 to join the Jorhat BT College as its principal and worked there until her retirement in 1969. She also served the Guwahati University as a member of its executive council, the renowned Indian educationist, awardee of Padmashree award.

People from this community are found in various districts of Brahmaputra Valley, Kamrup, Udalguri, Darrang, Lakhimpur, Nagaon, Majuli, Jorhat, Sivasagar, Dibrugarh etc. Notable persons of the Assamese Bania community of the 20th/ 21st century are Indra Bania (Actor), Kumar Sanjay Krishna (IAS officer) etc.
