= Himshikhar Television =

Television station in Damak, Nepal

- Logo of Himshikhar Television
- Country: Nepal
- Broadcast area: Nepal and Worldwide (Through Online)
- Network: Broadcast television, Optical and Online
- Headquarters: Damak, Jhapa, Nepal

Programming
- Picture format: 4:3, 576i, SDTV

Ownership
- Owner: Himshikhar Media Pvt. Ltd
- Key people: Dhurba Prasad Neupane (chairman)

History
- Launched: January 19, 2011

Links
- Website: himshikhartv.com.np

Himshikhar Television (Nepali: हिमशिखर टेलिभिजन) is a private television station based in Damak, in the East Region of Nepal and Kathmandu the capital city of Nepal. It was established in 2010 and started full phase broadcasting on January 19, 2011, under a terrestrial and cable television transmission license. It has offered programming on human rights and social issues, highlighted tourism places and area of prosperity, along with analysis on aspects of economic development in the Eastern Development Region.
