= Siyal (Odisha caste) =

South Asian social group

Siyal (also known as Khajuria) is a community found in western Odisha.

== Social status ==
According to the 1981 census, their population in Odisha is 18,677. The Siyals are an endogamous community and are divided into a number of totemic clans, like Kencho, Magoro, Salasa, Baraha and Sarpa. They comes under Scheduled caste of the state.
