= Dholi (caste) =

Musician caste in Western India

Doli
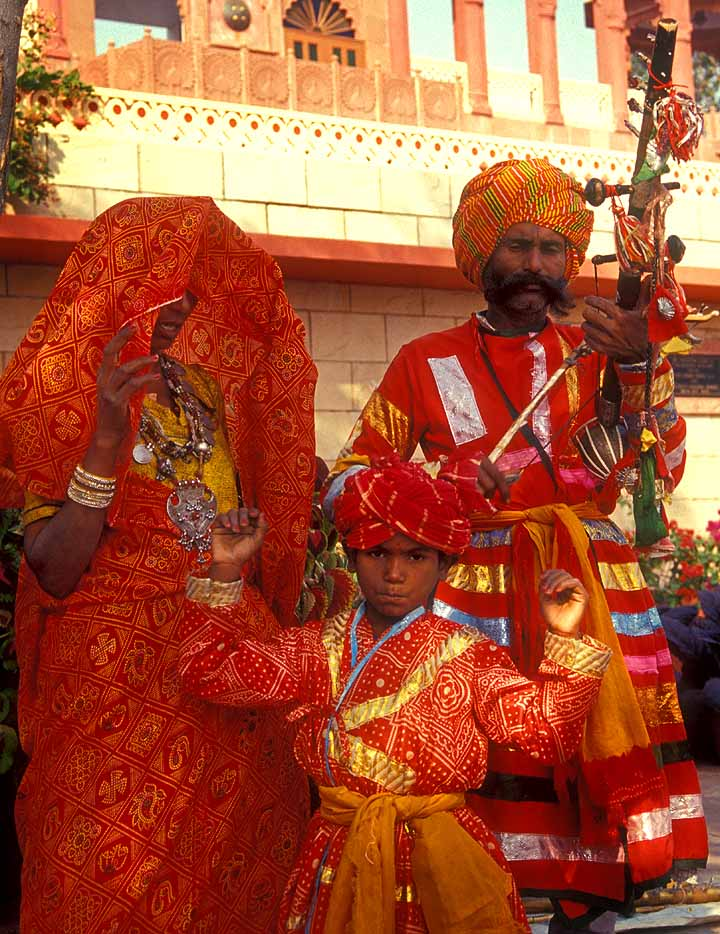
- A dholi street performer
- Religions: Hinduism
- Original state: Rajasthan
- Population: 134,287 (as of 2011)
- Status: SC
- Reservation (Education): yes
- Reservation (Employment): yes

Dholi is a traditional community of musicians, found primarily in Western India and used to play drums and Dholak in religious festivals. They are not a separate caste but a group of different communities engaged in the service of drumming and playing musical instruments in village festivals and related auspicions. They were considered as socially and economically backward residing in the rural areas.

Initially, they were not a specific caste but with the time the occupation of drum-playing became herediatery which lead to creation a Dholis as a caste, which was derived for the word 'Dhol' and includes member of other castes and tribes accumulated to form the group. Due to social backwardness and being in the lowest in the strata of caste system, they are recognized as Scheduled Castes.

In present times, they works as artisans and music professionals in functions and are considered as an important part of Culture of Rajasthan.
