= Kandra (caste) =

Dalit community in Odisha

Kandra, also known as Kandara or Kodama, is a Scheduled Caste community in East India, primarily in Odisha and West Bengal. They were traditionally engaged in the profession of fishing and artisan, though in the modern times many of the members of community have integrated in society.

== History ==
Kandra were historically nomadic community who were artisans, primarily in profession of Bamboo-making business and selling them in different parts of Odisha. Besides being artisans, they were heavily involved in the fishing due to presence in the coastal regions of the state and with time due to socio-economically backward. It is said that they were originated from the Sambalpur State and have also migrated to adjacent states of West Bengal and Andhra Pradesh. They are considered as similar to the Basor and Turi community due to similarity of being bamboo workers and documented by various names such as Kodma (in Mayurbhanj State), Kodama and Kadara.

== Demographics ==
They are recognized as Scheduled Caste inWest Bengal and Odisha, where they are sixth largest Scheduled Caste community with a population of 5,29,717 (as of 2011).

State	Category (SC or BC)	Caste	Population (2011)	Ref
Andhra Pradesh	OBC (or BC)	Kandra		
Odisha	SC	Kandra, Kandara, Kadama, Kuduma, Kodma, Kodama	5,29,717	
Telangana	OBC	Kadara, Kandra		
West Bengal	SC	Kandra	1,12,038	

== See also ==
- Basor
