= Rajbanshi language (Nepal) =

Indo-Aryan language spoken Nepal

Rajbanshi
- राजबंशी, ताजपुरीया
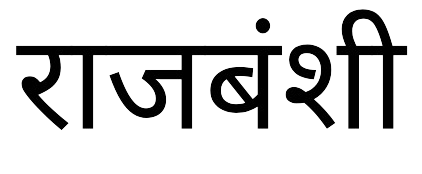
- "Rajbanshi" in Devanagari script
- Pronunciation: [radʒbɔŋʃi] [t̪aːd͡ʒpʊriːjaː]
- Native to: Nepal
- Region: Jhapa District, Morang District
- Ethnicity: Rajbanshi
- Native speakers: 170,000 (2011)
- Language family: Indo-European: Indo-Iranian; Indo-Aryan; Eastern; Odia–Bengali–Assamese; Bengali–Assamese; Kamrupa; Kamta; Western Kamta Tajpuriya; Rajbanshi
- Writing system: Devanagari and Bengali–Assamese Script

Language codes
- ISO 639-3: rjs
- Glottolog: rajb1243 Rajbanshi
- This is a map of the KRDS lects, with the Rajbanshi-speaking area shown in the North-West (in Nepal).

Rajbanshi (also called Tajpuria) is a Bengali-Assamese language spoken in Nepal. It is related to but is distinct from the Rangpuri/Kamta language in Bangladesh and India, which is also known by the alternative name "Rajbanshi". Rajbanshi and Kamta, along with two other languages, form the KRDS lect cluster.

== Phonology ==
This section is based on Wilde 2008.

=== Consonants ===
		Labial	Dental/ Alveolar	Retroflex	Palatal	Velar	Glottal
Stop	voiceless	p	t̪	ʈ		k	
Stop	aspirated	pʰ	t̪ʰ	ʈʰ		kʰ	
Stop	voiced	b	d̪	ɖ		ɡ	
Stop	breathy	bʱ	d̪ʱ	ɖʱ		ɡʱ	
Affricate	voiceless		ts				
Affricate	aspirated		tsʰ				
Affricate	voiced		dz				
Affricate	breathy		dzʱ				
Fricative			s		(ʃ)		h
Nasal	plain	m	n̪			ŋ	
Nasal	breathy	mʱ	n̪ʱ			ŋʱ	
Trill	plain		r				
Trill	breathy		rʱ				
Approximant	lateral		l				
Approximant	lateral br.		lʱ				
Approximant	central	(w)			(j)		

- /ts, tsʰ, dz, dzʱ/ can often be heard as post-alveolar [tʃ, tʃʰ, dʒ, dʒʱ], when following back vowels.
- /r/ and /rʱ/ can have allophones of [ɽ ɾ] and [ɽʱ ɾʱ].
- /b/ can have allophones of [β w].
- /pʰ/ can also be realised as [f].
- /s/ can also have an allophone of [ʃ].
- /h/ can be realised as voiceless or voiced [ɦ] in word-initial positions.
- /n̪/ can be heard as alveolar [n] before an alveolar consonant, and as a retroflex [ɳ] when preceding a retroflex consonant.
- A word-final /r/ may tend to be voiceless [r̥].
- Central approximants [w j] occur, but are deemed allophones of /u i/.

=== Vowels ===
	Front	Central	Back	
High	i		u	
Mid	e		ʌ	o
Low	æ	(ɐ)		

In addition to these vowels, Rangpuri has the following diphthongs: /ie, iæ, iu, iʌ, ui, uæ, uʌ, ei, eu, æi, æu, ʌi, ʌu/.

- Vowels /i, e/ can have shortened allophones of [ɪ, ɛ].
- /æ/ can also be articulated more central as [ä].
- /ʌ/ may also be heard as [ɜ, ə] in free variation.

== Morphology ==
One notable characteristic of Rājbanshi is the double agreement found regularly in verbs. Having this pattern also means that Rājbanshi, along with regional Indo-Aryan languages of Southern Nepal-Bihar-Jharkhand where multiple agreement is attested such as in Maithili, Kurmali, Majhi, and Darai share a verbal system that is distinct from the rest of the mainstream Indo-Aryan languages.

kalʰi di-m-(k)u-n
tomorrow give-FUT-2SG.OBJ-1SG.SUBJ
'I will give (it) to you tomorrow.'
