= Chain (caste) =

Caste in India

The Chain is a agrarian caste, found mainly in Bihar, Jharkhand, Odisha, Uttar Pradesh and West Bengal. They have traditionally been associated with cultivation and fishery.

== West Bengal ==
In West Bengal, although the Chain community is widely dispersed through the state, the Government granted Scheduled Castes (SC) status only to Chain members in four districts: Malda, Murshidabad, Nadia and Dakshin Dinajpur. Accordingly, the Socio Economic and Caste Census 2011 specifically reported the Chain only in these locations. The total Chain population in West Bengal is about 3.23 lakhs as of 2011 census. The National Commission for Scheduled Castes was reported in 2015 to be initiating a process to extend SC status to the community throughout West Bengal.
