= Poundra (caste) =

Dalit community of West Bengal, India

Poundra, earlier known as Pod, is a Bengali Hindu community originating from the region of Bengal. Traditionally located outside the four-tier ritual varna system, the Poundras have been historically subject to acute discrimination — including untouchability — and remain a marginal group in modern Bengal. As of 2011, their population was around two and a half million; they are classed as a Scheduled Caste in West Bengal.

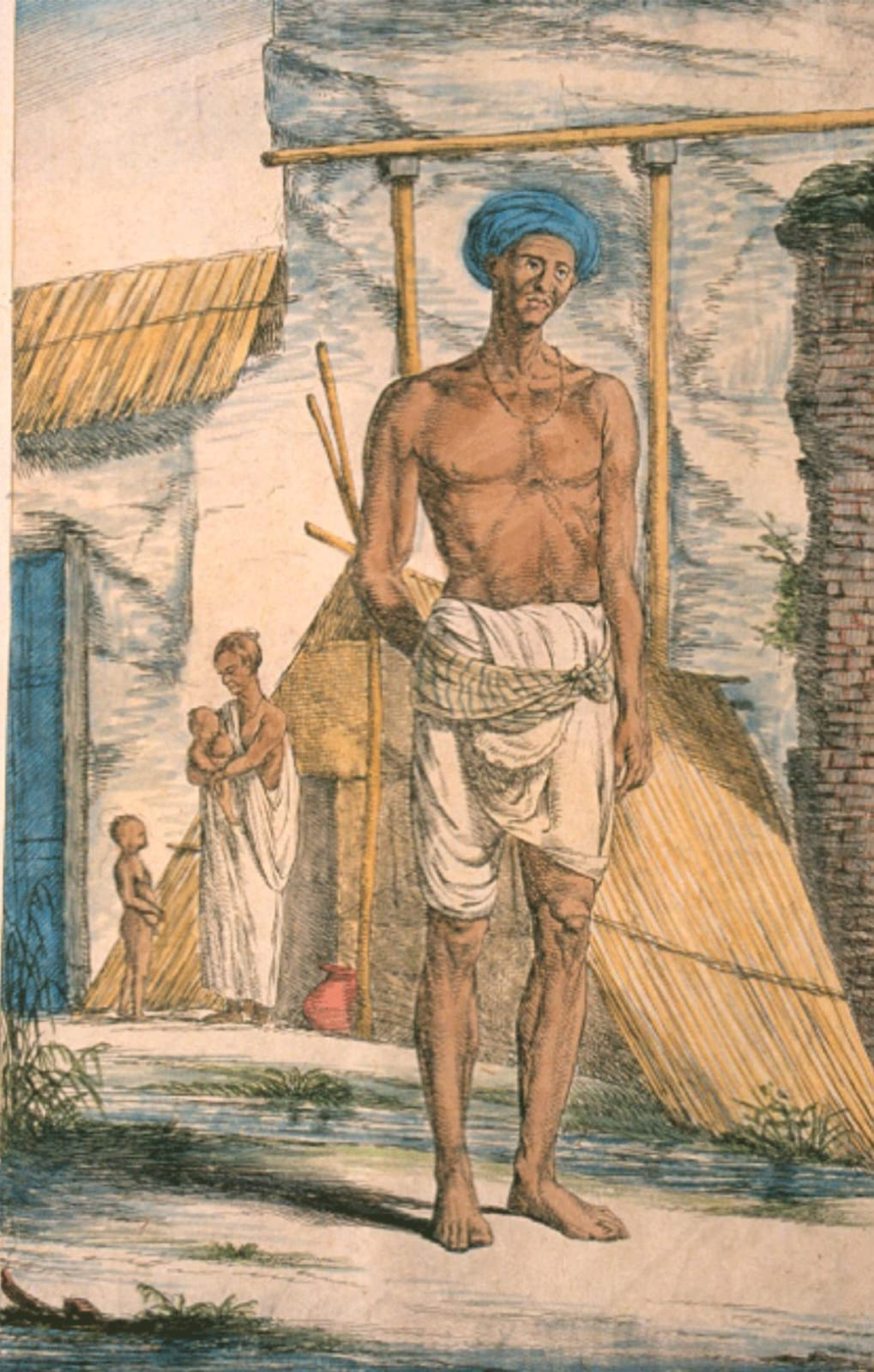
Pod labourer, from a 1799 collection of etchings

== History ==
=== Medieval Bengal ===
No mention of the Pods is found in the Bṛhaddharma Upapuraṇa (c. 13th century (Note: Ludo Rocher however notes the text to contain multiple layers (like all other Puranas) making any dating impossible. However, he agrees with R. C. Hazra that a significant part was composed as a response to the Islamic conquest of Bengal.)), which is the earliest known document to chronicle a hierarchy of castes in Bengal. (Note: Older sources on social setup (not caste) include inscriptions of the Gupta and the Pala periods but these do not refer to Pods.) The Brahma Vaivarta Purana, notable for a very late Bengali recension c. 14/15th century, records "Paundrakas" to be the son of a Vaisya father and Sundini mother but it is unknown if the groups are connected. Mentions are scarce in medieval vernacular literature.

=== Colonial Bengal ===
In his 1891 survey of castes, Herbert Hope Risley documented the Pods to be a branch of the Chandala; they were subject to untouchability by the Brahmins as well as the Navasakhas. A majority were peasants though some had become traders, and even zamindars.

In the late nineteenth century, two influential members of the Pod community — Benimadhab Halder and Srimanta Naskar — produced numerous tracts of caste history, as was a common feature of that time. Arguing a descent from the "Poundras" — mentioned across a spectrum of Brahminical literature — they sought to establish the Pods as Kshatriyas, thereby removing the stigma of untouchability. In what might be construed as a self-respect movement, it was also demanded of all Pods to follow Kshatriya rituals. In 1901, Halder organized a pan-Bengal conference of the Pods, wherein it was resolved to have the government rename the caste as "Poundra". Further mobilisation happened under the leadership of Raicharan Sardar, a lawyer and the first university graduate from the community.

=== Contemporary Bengal ===
The Poundras remain vulnerable to casteist discrimination in 21st century Bengal.
