= Patni caste =

Indian caste

Patni
Regions with significant populations
- • India •

Languages
- • Bengali • Manipuri

Religion
- Hinduism, Christianity

The Patni community is a Scheduled Caste who are mainly found in the region of Barak Valley.

== History ==
Patni might be related to the Domba community of Assam and in some areas their names are used interchangeably. The main occupation of Patnis include ferrying boats, basket-making, trading and cultivating. According to Patnis folklore Ishwari Patni ferries Goddess Annapurna on his boat, also mentioned by Bharatchandra.

Patnis are also called Nadiyal and they mainly lived in Sylhet, Dacca, etc and migrated towards districts of Assam, West Bengal and Manipur.

The Patnis are divided into five sub-castes:

- Jat-Patni, who are agriculturists and small traders.
- Ghat-Patni, Salami or Ghatwal who work as boatmen and take charge of ferries.
- Dom-Patni, Machhwa, or Nagarchi, who catch fish.
- Sansphor and Dagara, who makes baskets of cane, and tie the framework of kancha houses.
