= Kewat language =

Indo-Aryan language spoken in Nepal

Kewat
- केवट, कयोर्ट কেৱট, কয়োৰ্ট
- Native to: Nepal
- Region: Terai (Predominantly Nepal)
- Ethnicity: Kewat
- Language family: Indo-European: Indo-Iranian; Indo-Aryan; Eastern; Bengali–Assamese; Kamrupa; Kamta; Western Kamta; Kewat
- Writing system: Devanagari

Language codes
- ISO 639-3: kyv
- Glottolog: kayo1247
- This is a map of the KRDS lects, with the Kewat-speaking area shown in the north-west (in Nepal).

Kewat, also known as Kayort is a Bengali-Assamese language spoken in the Terai and adjacent lowlands of southern Nepal. It is considered endangered, with only a small number of speakers reported in linguistic surveys and language resource listings.

== Names ==
Besides Kewat and Kayort, the language is also known by several alternate names, including Kayot, Kaot, Kevat, Kewati and Kevati.

== Classification ==
Kewat belongs to the Eastern zone of the Indo-Aryan branch of the Indo-European family, though its precise classification is uncertain due to limited data.

Some catalogues list Kewat as an alternate name or local variety of Bagheli or related Eastern Indo-Aryan lects, suggesting possible overlap or inclusion in a dialect chain. Because it is severely under-documented, priority research includes updating speaker counts, dialect mapping, phonological and morphological description, and documentation of intergenerational transmission.

== Distribution ==
Kewat is primarily spoken in the southern districts of Nepal's Terai near the India-Nepal border, though detailed mapping of its speaker communities remains incomplete. There is currently no comprehensive descriptive grammar, phonology, or text corpus for Kewat available in the academic literature.
