= Rajbanshi people =

South Asian ethnic group

Rajbanshi
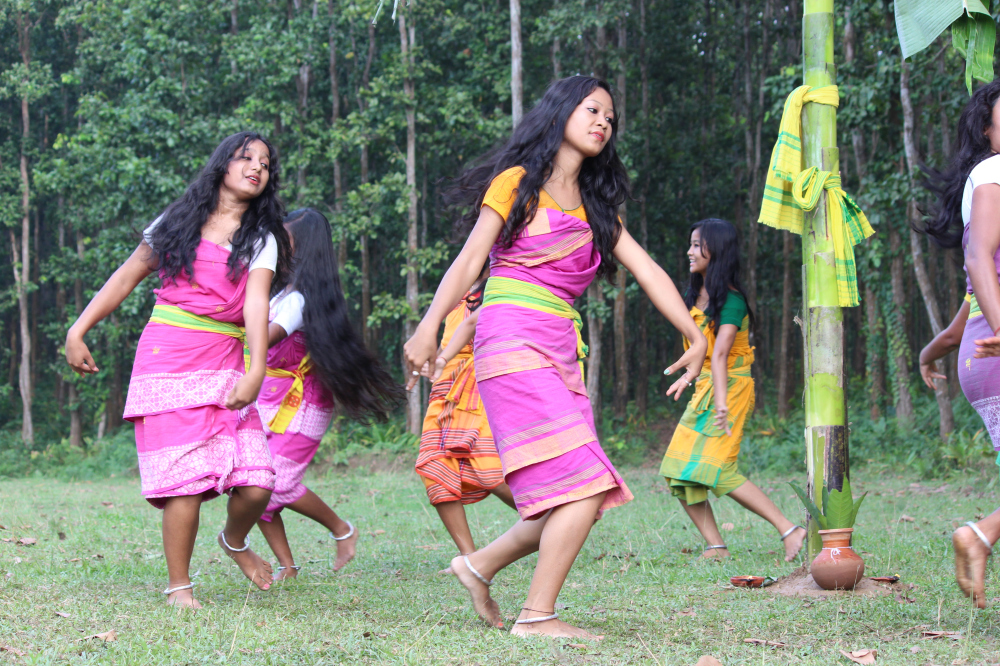
- Rajbanshi women dancing in Assam, India

Regions with significant populations
- India: Assam: 7,021,254 (2011)
- West Bengal: 3,983,316 (2011)
- Bihar: 290,079 (2023)
- Nepal: 127,985 (2021)
- Bangladesh: 13,193 (2022)

Languages
- Rajbanshi, Kamtapuri/Rangpuri, Assamese, Bengali, Nepali

Religion
- Hinduism • Islam

Related ethnic groups
- Nashya Shaikh, Koch, Rabhas, Garos, Boros, Mech, Tharu other Indo-Aryan people

The Rajbanshi, also Rajbongshi and Koch-Rajbongshi, are peoples from Lower Assam, North Bengal, eastern Bihar of India, Terai region of eastern Nepal, Rangpur Division of North Bangladesh and Bhutan who have in the past sought an association with the Koch dynasty. Koch-Rajbanshi people speak Kamatapuri, an Indo-Aryan language. The community is categorised as OBC in Assam and Bihar, and in West Bengal Koch, Rajbanshi, Banshi-Barman are three separate groups of people where Koch is categorised as ST and Rajbanshi are SC, and Banshi Barman are OBC. In Nepal they are considered part of the Plains Janjati. They are the largest Scheduled Caste community of West Bengal.

In 2020, Kamatapur Autonomous Council was created for the socio-economic development and political rights of the Koch-Rajbongshi community residing in Assam.

They are related to the ethnic Koch people found in Meghalaya but are distinguished from them as well as from the Hindu caste called Koch in Upper Assam that receives converts from different tribes. Rajbanshi (of royal lineage) alludes to the community's claimed connection with the Koch dynasty.

== Etymology ==
The Rajbanshi (literal meaning: of a royal lineage) community gave itself this name after 1891 following a movement to distance itself from an ethnic identity and acquire the higher social status of Kshatriya Hindu varna instead. They tried to establish the Kshatriya identity by linking the community to the Koch dynasty. The Rajbanshis were officially recorded as Koch till the 1901 census. The name Rajbanshi is a 19th century neologism.

== Demography ==
Map of the Jalpaiguri division of North Bengal Region of West Bengal, India

Worldwide, there are an estimated 11-12 million Rajbanshi people. According to 1971 Census figures, 31.6% of the Jalpaiguri division area of North Bengal population was once of the Rajbanshi community. As per as last late 2011 census, It has been estimated that it has come down to mere 30%. The un-checked infiltration along the Indo-Bangladesh border and intrusion of many Biharis caused a lot of demographic change over time. Population of Bengali Muslims, Bihari Muslims and Bengali Hindu Namasudras have increased rapidly in areas like Jalpaiguri, Oodlabari, Gairkata and Jaigaon over the last 50 years, hence causing demographic changes over time.

== History ==
In ancient times, the land which the Rajbanshi inhabit was called Kamarupa. Its inhabitants spoke Tibeto-Burman languages. There is no mention of 'Rajbanshi' in Persian records, the Ahom Buranjis or the 18th-century Darrang Raja Vamsavali: the genealogical records of the Koch Bihar royal family, although there is mention of the Koch as a distinct social group. From the 17th century the Koch society came under increasing brahminical influence and by the end of the 18th century a greater part of the Koch became amenable to it.

=== Late 19th century and early 20th century ===
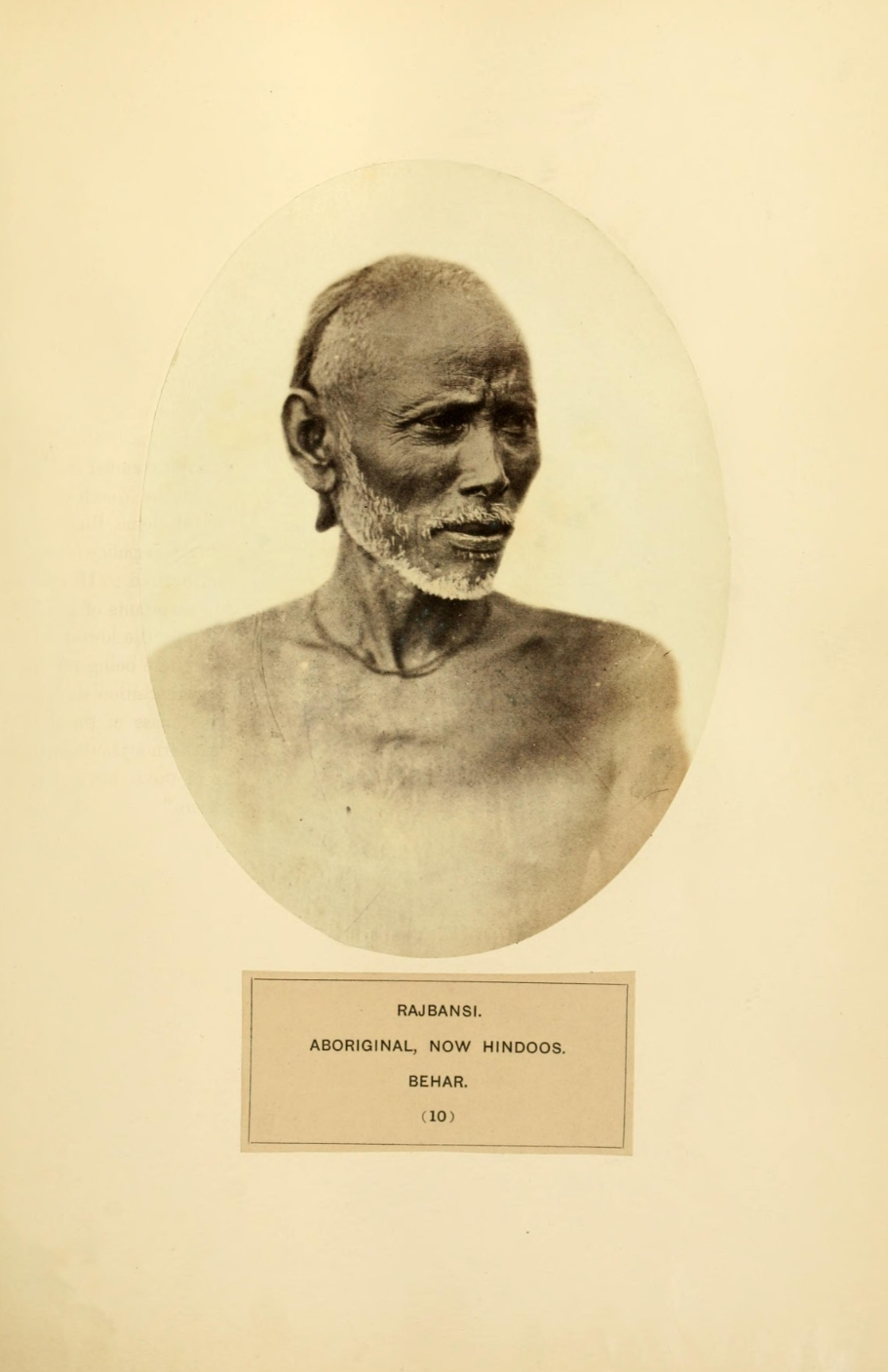
Rajbongshi Aboriginal from Behar, c. 1868

Starting from 1872 to 1891, in a series of social movements, a section of Koch who were at tribal or semi-tribal form in present North Bengal and Western Assam in an effort to promote themselves up the caste hierarchy tried to dissociate themselves from their ethnic identity by describing themselves as Rajbanshi (of the royal lineage). This attempt of social upliftment was a reaction against the ill treatment and humiliation faced by the community from the caste Hindus who referred to the Koch as mleccha or barbarians. The term Rajbanshi was used to connect the group with Koch royalty who called themselves Shiva-banshi or Rajbanshi under Biswa Singha, the founder of the Koch dynasty and a tribal who was Hinduised and promoted to Kshatriya varna in the early 1500s.

By 1891, the Koch who came to be known as Rajbanshi claimed a new status of Bhanga Kshatriya to proof themselves to be a provincial variety of the Kshatriyas, the movement of Bhanga Kshatriya was undertaken by Harimohan Ray Khajanchi who established the "Rangpur Bratya Kshatriya Jatir Unnati Bidhayani Sabha" for the upward mobility of the community in the Hindu society.

To justify this, the group collected reference from Hindu religious text such as the Kalika Purana, Yogini Tantra etc and created legends that they originally belonged to the kshatriya varna but left their homeland in the fear of annihilation by the brahmin sage Parashurama and took refuge in Paundradesh (currently in Northern bengal and Rangpur division of Bangladesh) and later came to be known as Bhanga Kshatriyas. The story so created was to provide a convincing myth to assert their Kshatriya origin and perform as an ideological base for the movement but this failed to make any wider effect on the community and were denied the Kshatriya status.

In 1910, the Rajbanshi who were classified as the member of the same caste as the Koches claimed a new identity of Rajbanshi Kshatriya, this time under the leadership of Panchanan Barma who established the Kshatriya Samiti in Rangpur, it separated the Rajbanshis from their Koch identity and was also successful in getting the Kshatriya status after getting recognition from different Brahmin pandits of Mithila, Rangpur, Kamrup and Koch Bihar. Following this, the district magistrate gave permission to use surnames like Roy, Ray, Barman, Sinha, Adhikary etc. to replace the older traditional surnames like Sarkar, Ghosh, Das or Mandal and the Kshatriya status was granted in the final report of 1911 census. The movement manifested itself in sankritising tendencies with an assertion of Aryan origin and striving for higher social status by imitating higher caste customs and rituals.

With this lakhs of Rajbanshi took ritual bath in the Karatoya River and adopted the practices of the twice born (Dvija), like the wearing of the sacred thread (Upanayana), adoption of gotra name, shortening in period of 'asauch' from 30 days to 12. They gave up practices that were forbidden in the Hindu religion like the drinking of liquor (Teetotalism) and rearing of pigs. From 1872 to 1911 in an effort to be a part of the higher caste, the Koch went through three distinct social identities in the census, Koch to Rajbanshi (1872), Rajbanshi to Bhanga Kshatriya (1891), Bhanga Kshatriya to Rajbanshi Kshatriya (1911).

Today the Koch-Rajbongshis are found throughout North Bengal, particularly in the Dooars, as well as parts of Lower Assam, northern Bangladesh (Rangpur Division), the Terai of eastern Nepal and Bihar, and Bhutan.

Some writers suggest that the Rajbanshi people constitute from different ethnic groups who underwent Sankritisation to reach the present form and in the process abandoned their original Tibeto-burman tongue to be replaced by the Indo-Aryan languages. There exist Rajbanshi people in South Bengal districts of Midnapur, 24 Paraganas, Hoogly and Nadia who might not belong to the same ethnic stock.

=== Post-independence (1947–present) ===
After Partition, the Kshatriya Samithi lost its headquarters at Rangpur and attempted to reestablish itself at Dinhata. However, a variety of new organisations to represent the Rajbanshi were being created. In Assam, the Rajbanshis were classified in a special category of OBC called MOBC. In North Bengal, the various new Rajbanshi organisations began to see the Rajbanshi identity as ethnolinguistic in nature rather than a caste, since the various other communities living in North Bengal and Lower Assam also spoke the Rajbanshi language. This linguistic awareness was heightened in 1953, when the government decided to reorganise the states on linguistic basis. Many of these organisations, such as Siliguri Zonal Rajbanshi Kshatriya Samiti agitated for the merger of Purnia division of Bihar and Goalpara district of Assam into West Bengal since these regions were largely populated by Rajbanshi speakers. This was continued into the 1960s with Rajbanshi activists frequently demanding for their speech to be recognised as separate from Bengali.

== Occupation ==
The Rajbongshis traditionally practice Mixed farming, but due to their numerical dominance in North Bengal there were significant occupational differences among them. Most were agricultural labourers (halua) or sharecroppers (adhiar). These often worked for landed cultivators, called dar-chukanidars. Above them were the chukandiars, who could sub-let their land to dar-chukanidars, and jotedars, who acted as intermediaries between the chukandiars and the zamindars, landowners that got their land from the government in exchange for a fixed amount of revenue. Some Rajbongshis were zamindars or jotedars.

== Lifestyle and culture ==
According to a 2019 research, the Koch Rajbongshi community has an oral tradition of agriculture, dance, music, medical practices, song, the building of house, culture, and language. Ideally the tribe transfer the know-how from one generation to another.

Music forms are integral part of Koch-Rajbongshi culture. The main musical forms of Koch-Rajbongshi culture are Bhawaiyya, Chatka, Chorchunni, Palatia, Lahankari, Tukkhya, Bishohora Pala among many others. Various instruments are used for such performances, string instruments like Dotora, Sarindra and Bena, double-membrane instruments like Tasi, Dhak, Khol, Desi Dhol and Mridanga, gongs and bells like Kansi, Khartal and wind instruments like Sanai, Mukha bansi and Kupa bansi.

== Rajbanshi people in Nepal ==
The 2011 Nepal census classifies the Rajbanshi people within the broader social group of Terai Janajati. At the time of the Nepal census of 2011, 115,242 people (0.4% of the population of Nepal) were Rajbanshi. The frequency of Rajbanshi people by province was as follows:

- Koshi Province (2.5%)
- Bagmati Province (0.0%)
- Gandaki Province (0.0%)
- Lumbini Province (0.0%)
- Madhesh Province (0.0%)
- Sudurpashchim Province (0.0%)
- Karnali Province (0.0%)

The frequency of Rajbanshi people was higher than national average (0.4%) in the following districts:

- Jhapa (9.1%)
- Morang (3.9%)

== Notable people ==
- Panchanan Barma, (1866–1935) Indian social reformer of the Rajbanshi community from West Bengal.
- Upendranath Barman, (1 December 1899 – 7 February 1988) Indian politician from West Bengal.
- Pramathesh Chandra Barua, (24 October 1903 – 29 November 1951) was an Indian actor, director, and screenwriter of Indian films in the pre-independence era, born in Gauripur, Dhubri, Assam.
- Sarat Chandra Singha, (1 January 1914 – 25 December 2005) Former Chief Minister of Assam.
- Ambika Charan Choudhury, (16 August 1930 – 4 December 2011), popularly known as Kamataratna, from Borpara, Bongaigaon, Assam.
- Pratima Barua Pandey, (3 October 1934 – 27 December 2002) was an Indian folk singer from the royal family of Gauripur in Western Assam's Dhubri district.
- Madhab Rajbangshi, (7 July 1954) Indian Politician from Assam.
- Mouni Roy, (28 September 1985) Indian actress from West Bengal.
- Swapna Barman, (29 October 1996) is an Indian heptathlete. She won the gold medal at 2018 Asian Games and placed first in the Heptathlon at the 2017 Asian Athletics Championships.
- Lalit Rajbanshi, (27 February 1999) Nepalese cricketer of Nepal National Cricket Team.
- Tuluram Rajbanshi, Nepalese politician associated with Nepal Communist Party.

== See also ==
- Kamtapur
- Kamtapur Autonomous Council
- Kamtapur People's Party
- Kamtapur Progressive Party
- Kamtapur Liberation Organisation
- KRDS lects
- Rangpuri language
