= Jalia Kaibarta =

Caste in the Indian subcontinent

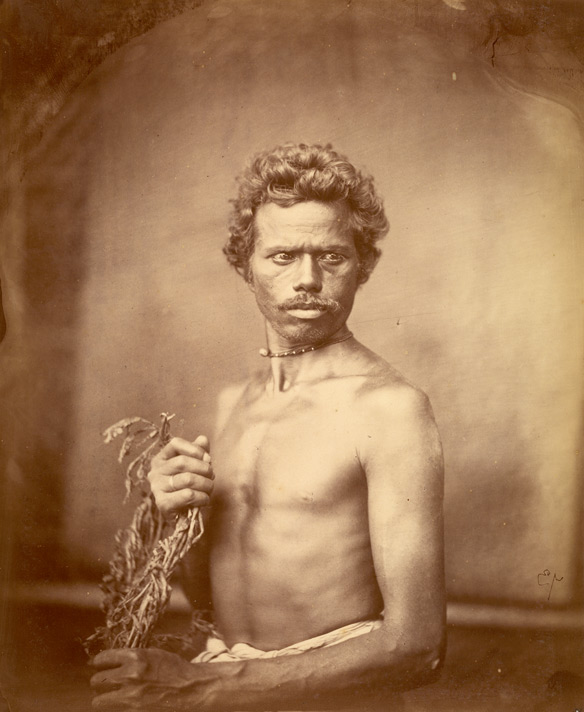
- Kaibarta fisherman in East Bengal 1860s

Regions with significant populations
- India (Assam, West Bengal, Tripura, Odisha); Bangladesh (Rangpur, Mymensingh, Dhaka, Sylhet and Chittagong divisions)

Languages
- Assamese • Bengali • Odia

Religion
- Hinduism • Buddhism

Jalia Kaibarta (or Jaliya Kaibartta, or Jāliya Kaivarta) is a traditional fishing and boating community, originally belonging to Assam, West Bengal, Odisha and eastern Bihar, along with Bangladesh. In Assam, communities like Dom, comprising people of low ritual status, fishermen and fishmongers (Nikari), later acquired respectable caste identities within the larger Hindu fold by adopting Kaibartta name, helped by their commercial prosperity and Vaishnavite affiliations, through Sanskritisation. Jalia Kaibartas are categorised as a Scheduled Caste (SC) and are the second largest among the 16 SCs in Assam under the name Kaibartta, Jaliya.

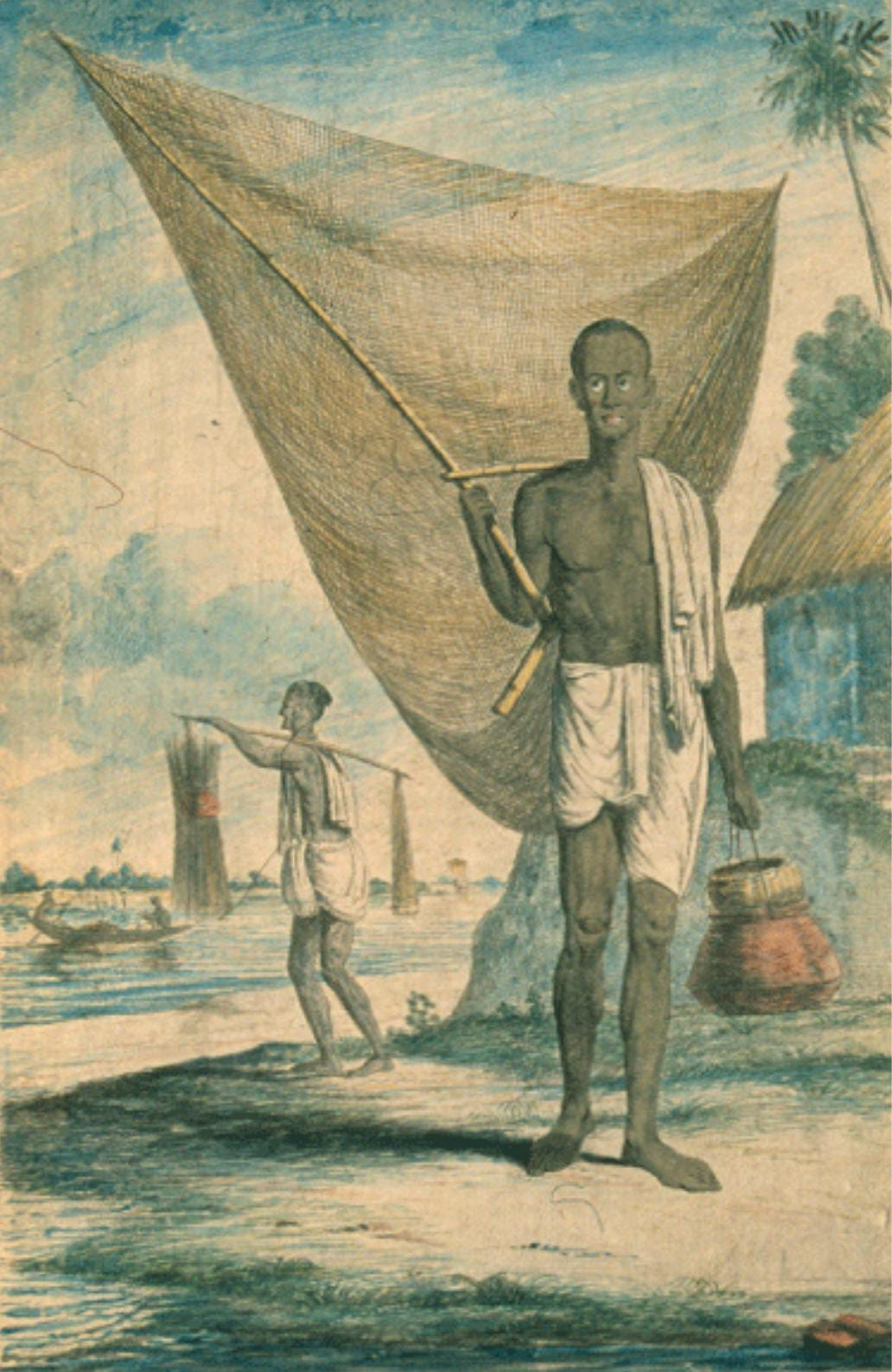
Jaliya fisherman, from a 1799 collection of etchings

== History ==
Srishtidhar Dutta considers Kaibarta to be a Hinduised word of Kevatta which refer to a class of fishermen in the Buddhist Jatakas.

People from the Kaibarta caste were responsible for rowing the boats during overseas activities by Sadhabas (ancient mariners from Kalinga) and were known as Majhis or Kandariyas. They have their own guild known as machhuya which is one of the eighteen guilds or srenis mentioned in Gupta period a period work called Jambu-dvipa-prajña.

The first Abahattha or late Apabhraṃśa manuscript, in the form of Caryapādas, was written by a Buddhist priest, known in Tibetan language as Lui-pā, who is identified with Matsyendranātha, a member of the fishermen community of the medieval period, which later became Kaibartas.

Medieval Odia poet and Vaishnav saint Achyutananda Dasa wrote kaibarta Gita which narrates the origin, growth, functions and roles of this community.

In Assam, the Kaibartas and Keots were initially considered a single community divided into two groups, Haliya and Jaliya Kaibarta, where the Haliya Kaibarta are considered to be superior to the latter. Many from the Jalia Kaibarta community, under the influence of Garamur satradhikar, gave up their traditional occupation of fishing and divided themselves into – mach mara and mach na-mara. They are also claimed to have their own priests. In colonial Assam, the upper echelons of Dom fishermen society aspired to acquire a new respectable caste identity within the larger Hindu fold. Assam already possessed an agriculturist caste of Kaibartas. For Dom elites, the acquisition of Nadiyal status would only be a first step. Prosperous Dom/Nadiyals aspire to join Kaibarta rank while wishing to retain their profitable occupation of trade in fish. In the 1911 census, officials recognised Doms by the name of Nadiyal. In 1921, Nadiyals were upgraded to Kaibartas.

=== Kaivarta Revolt ===
The Kaivarta revolt, also known as the Varendra rebellion, is a significant event in Indian history, particularly in the context of early mediaeval Bengal. It was a revolt against King Mahipala II led by Kaivarta chieftain Divya, a feudal lord of Northern Bengal. According to historian Ryosuke Furui, these events connote settling of non-agrarian groups in agrarian frontier and the growth of some section to a class of landholders. Furui further noted there might also be a diverse social group in Varendra labelled as "Kaivarta". The Kaivartas acquired the position of subordinate rulers through their association with the Pāla kings in the forms of military or other services and the appointment to administrative positions.

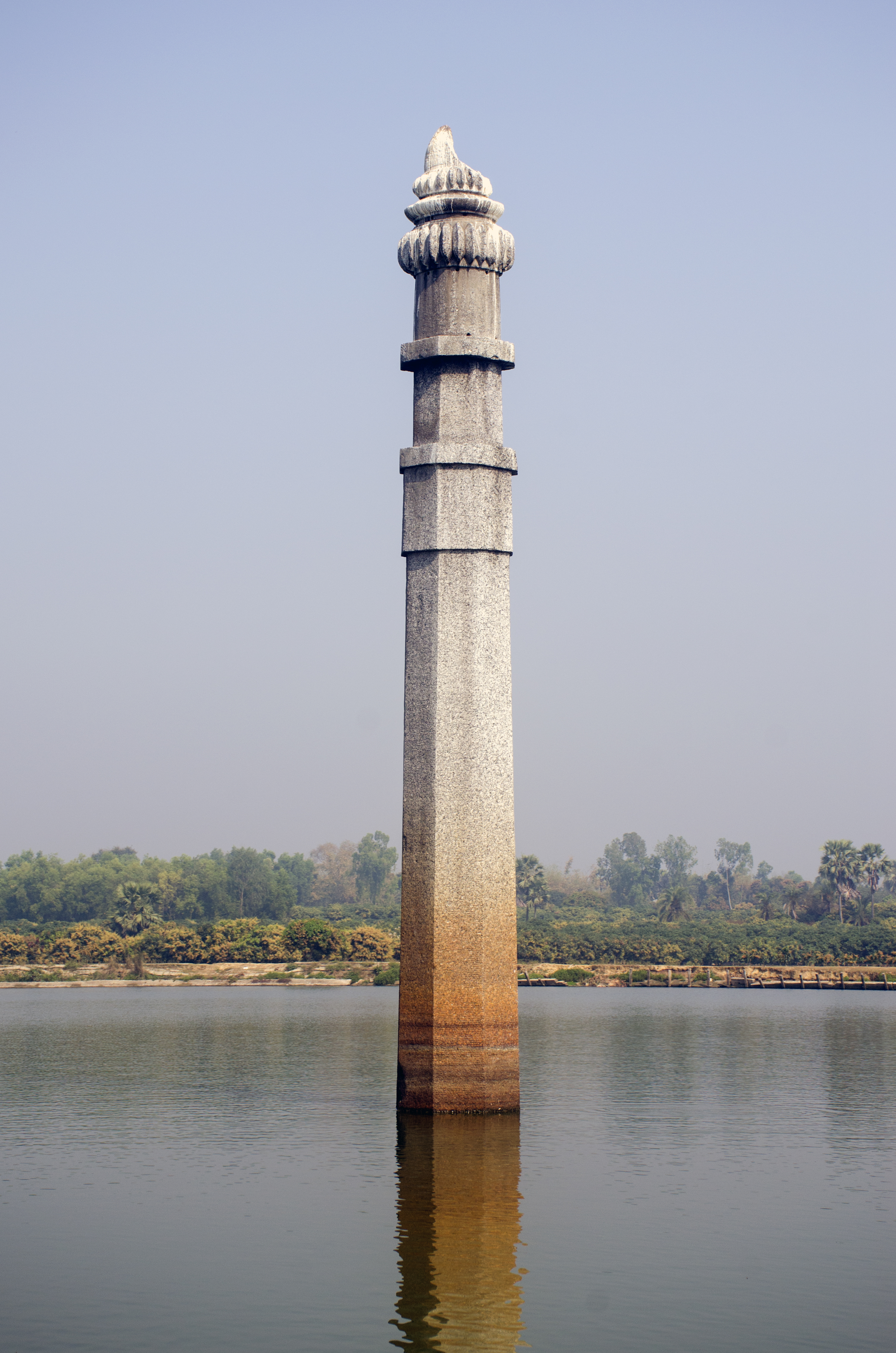
Kaivarta Stambha erected by Kaivarta chieftain Divya.

== Controversy ==
There are demands of exclusion of sub-caste titled 'Kaibarta, Keuta and Dhibara' from SC category in Orissa. In 2012 the leaders of State Aprushya Dalit Sarankshan Suraksha Samiti submitted a memorandum to the Chief Minister calling for immediate deletion of this caste from the list as "they did not fulfill the basic parameters of untouchability." In 2022 Orissa High Court had rejected the prayer for removal of 'Keuta, Kaibarta, and Dhibara' from Scheduled Castes on the ground that neither inclusion or exclusion of community from the list of scheduled caste in the constitution order 1950 is permissible at the instance of the court. In 2023 thousands of members of this samiti again staged a demonstration in front of District Collector's office. According to them, "People belonging to Kaibarta, Keuta and Dhibar sub-castes are not at all Dalits, but they are enjoying 80 per cent reservation benefits meant for SC category at the cost of real Dalits. Therefore the Government should delete these sub-castes from the SC list."

== Notable people ==
- Bhupen Hazarika, musician, playback singer, lyricist, poet, actor and filmmaker from Assam, awarded with the Dadasaheb Phalke Award and the Bharat Ratna
- Jayanta Hazarika, musician, playback singer from Assam
- Harishankar Jaladas, Bangladeshi educationist and novelist

== See also ==
- Mahishya
- Varendra Rebellion
- Guha (Ramayana)
- Kewat
- Kevatta Sutta

== Citations ==
- Dutta, Shristidhar (1985). The Mataks and their Kingdom. Allahabad: Chugh publication.
- Cantile, Audrey (1980). CASTE AND SECT IN AN ASSAMESE VILLAGE (Ph.D.). University of London.
