= Kewat people =

Ethnic group and caste found in India and Nepal

Regions with significant populations
- India
- Bihar: 937,861 (0.7174% of Bihar's population)
- West Bengal: 88,530
- Assam: unknown

Languages
- Kewat language

Religion
- Hinduism

The Kewat, also spelled Kevat, is an ethnic group and Hindu caste, found in the states of Assam, Bihar, Tripura, Uttar Pradesh and West Bengal in India. They are the traditional boatmen of northern India, and also in neighbouring country Nepal. They natively speak the Kewat language, an Eastern Indo-Aryan language. But the language is now declining as they have begun to speak the languages commonly used in the regions where they live.

== Origin ==
The name "Kevata" first appeared in the Pillar Edict V of Emperor Ashoka.

== In India: Present circumstances ==
The Kewat are among the 17 OBC communities of Uttar Pradesh that have been proposed for Scheduled Caste status by the Samajwadi Party-controlled Government. However, this proposal, which relates to votebank politics and has been made in the past, has been stayed by the courts; a prior attempt was also rejected by the Government of India.

Kewats are recognised as Scheduled Caste in the states of Assam, West Bengal and Tripura as Keot, Keyot or Jalkeot.

With a population of 937,861, Kewats constitute 0.7174% of Bihar's population in the 2023 caste census.

== In Nepal ==
Some Kewats in Nepal speak the Kewat language alongside Nepali. Most Kewat speakers are found in Nepal, since many Kewats in India or Bangladesh usually speak the dominant regional languages of the areas they live in. The Central Bureau of Statistics of Nepal classifies the Kewat as a subgroup within the broader social group of Madheshi Other Caste. At the time of the 2011 Nepal census, 153,772 people (0.6% of the population of Nepal) were Kewat. The frequency of Kewat by province was as follows:

- Madhesh Province (1.4%)
- Lumbini Province (1.0%)
- Koshi Province (0.6%)
- Bagmati Province (0.0%)
- Gandaki Province (0.0%)
- Sudurpashchim Province (0.0%)
- Karnali Province (0.0%)

The frequency of Kewat was higher than national average (0.6%) in the following districts:

- Dhanusha (6.1%)
- Parasi (3.5%)
- Morang (2.7%)
- Rupandehi (2.5%)
- Siraha (2.2%)
- Kapilvastu (2.1%)
- Mahottari (1.1%)
