= List of Dalits =

Notable people of the Dalit Community

This is a list of notable Dalit individuals, categorized by their contributions across various fields and professions.

== Academics ==
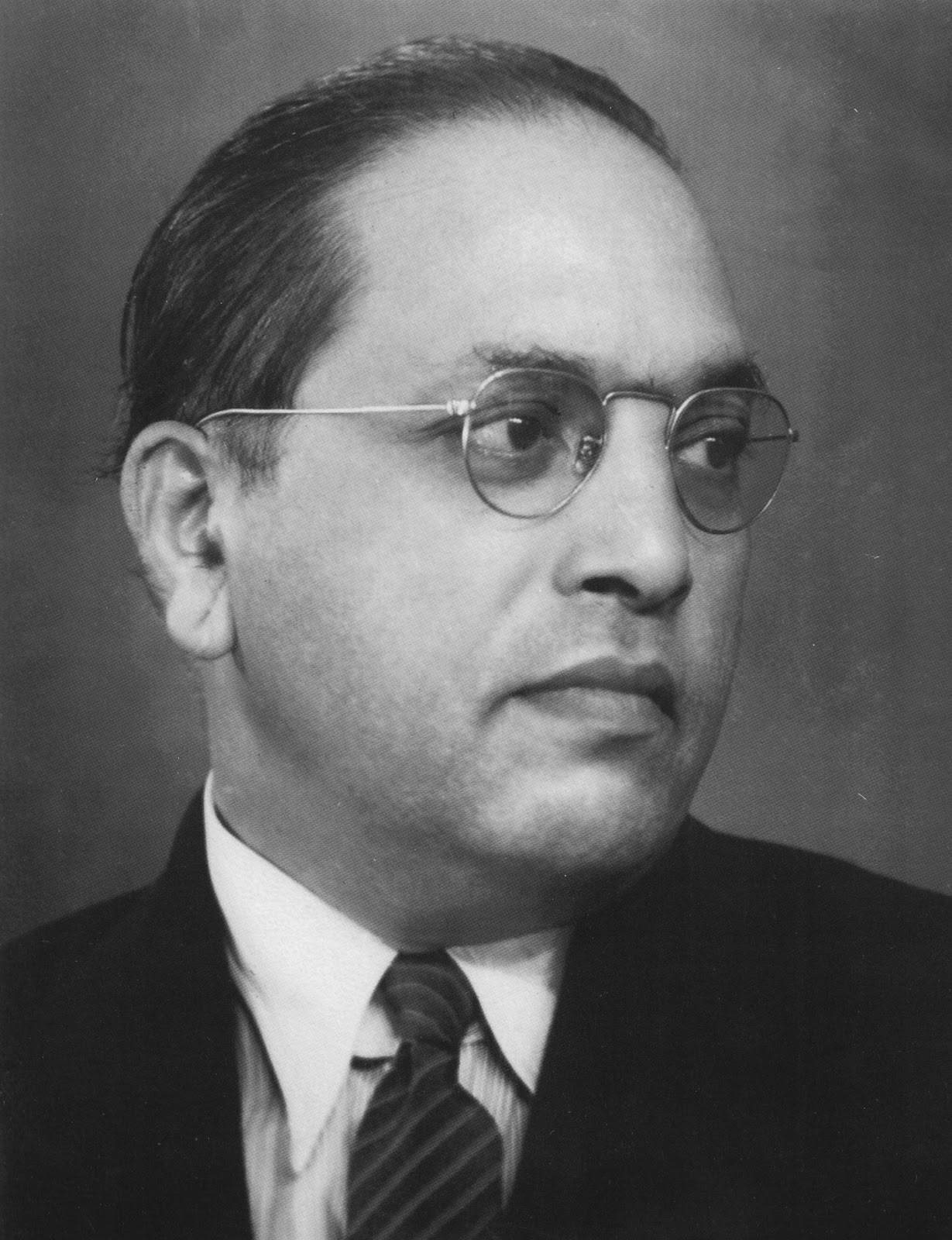
Babasaheb Ambedkar

- Dr. B. R. Ambedkar, economist and politician
- Meghnad Saha, astrophysicist who developed the Saha ionization equation
- Narendra Jadhav, economist, writer and educationist
- Satyendra Murli, researcher, media pedagogue and journalist
- Sukhadeo Thorat, economist and Padma Shri recipient

== Activists ==
- Anand Teltumbde, Indian scholar, writer, and human rights activist
- K.P. Ashwini, UN Special rapporteur on racism from 2022
- Ayyankali, Indian social reformer
- Gopal Baba Walangkar, activist
- Hari Prasad Tamta, social reformer
- Immanuvel Sekaran, a freedom fighter and civil rights activist
- Kuyili, freedom fighter and Commander in Chief of Velu Nachiyar
- Meena Kandaswamy, poet and Dalit activist
- Manu Bheel former bonded laborer and human rights activist from Pakistan
- Rettamalai Srinivasan, activist and politician
- Uda Devi, freedom fighter

== Art ==
- Savindra Savarkar, Indian artist, known for his use of Buddhist imagery and Dalit subjectivity

== Cinema and television ==
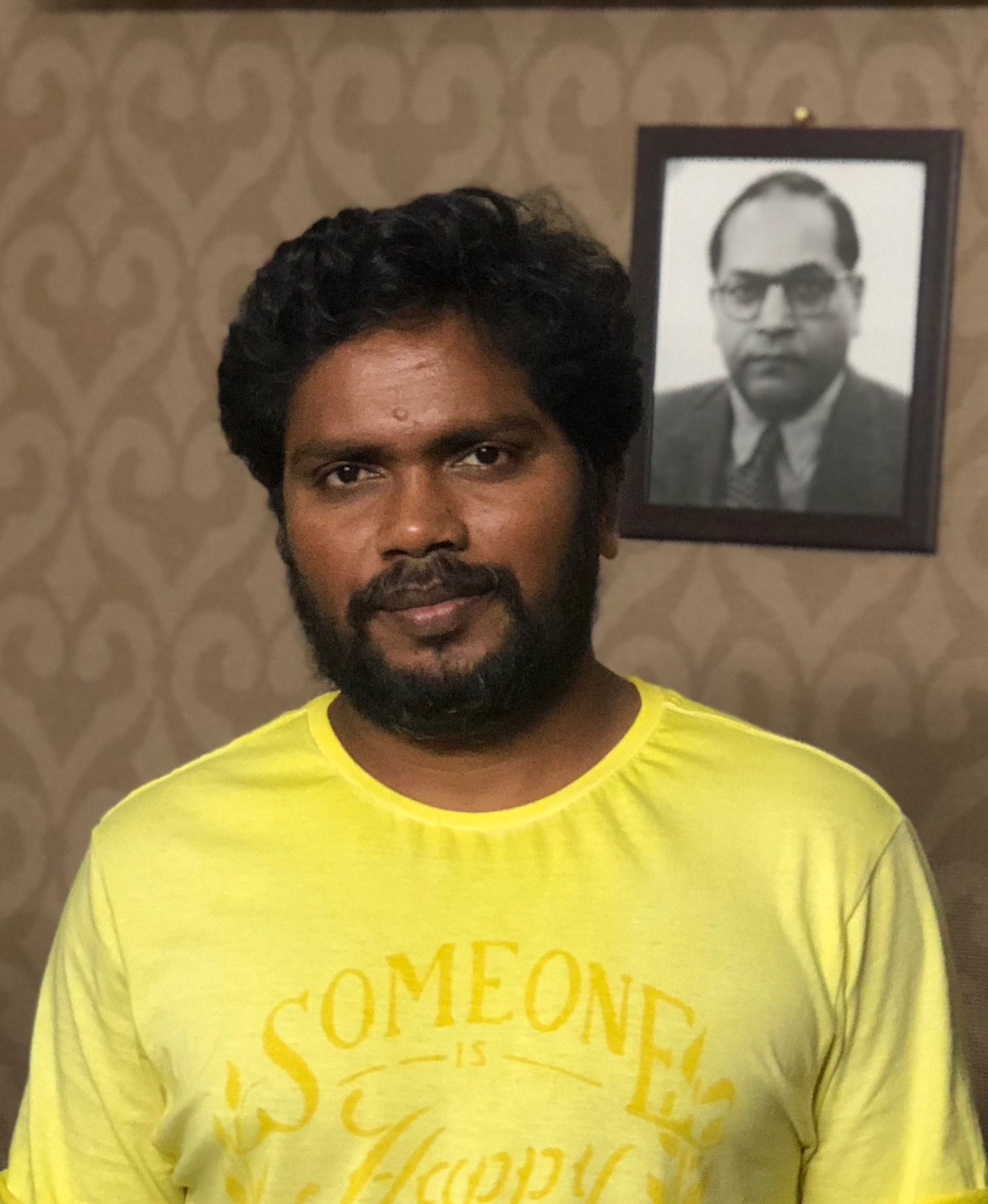
Pa. Ranjith

- Kanjibhai Rathod, an Indian director, is considered the first successful director of Indian cinema
- Kalabhavan Mani, actor and singer
- Pa. Ranjith, director and filmmaker
- P.K. Rosy, first heroine in Malayalam cinema
- Tun Tun, actress and comedian of Hindi cinema
- Neeraj Ghaywan, director
- Nagraj Manjule, director
- Archana Gautam, Indian actress and winner of Miss Bikini India 2018.

== Literature ==
- Annabhau Sathe, Indian folk poet, writer, and social worker from Maharashtra.
- Shailendra, Indian poet and lyricist
- Baburao Bagul, Marathi writer
- Daya Pawar, Marathi writer who received Padma Shri
- Lal Singh Dil, Punjabi poet
- Namdeo Dhasal, Marathi poet and writer from Maharashtra
- Neerav Patel, first Dalit poet to write poetry in English
- Om Prakash Valmiki, Hindi poet and writer
- P. Sivakami, Dalit-feminist Tamil writer
- Yashica Dutt, Indian writer and journalist
- Manoranjan Byapari, Bengali writer, Activist and chairman of west Bengal Dalit Sahitya Academy

== Music ==
- Ilaiyaraaja, Indian music composer
- Amar Singh Chamkila, Indian Punjabi singer and songwriter
- Arivu, Indian rapper and songwriter
- Ginni Mahi, Indian singer
- Sumeet Samos, Indian anti-caste rapper
- Vedan, Indian rapper and songwriter

== Politicians ==
=== Presidents ===
- K. R. Narayanan, 10th president of India (1997–2002) and 9th vice president of India (1992–1997)
- Ramnath Kovind, 14th President of India

=== Deputy Prime Ministers ===
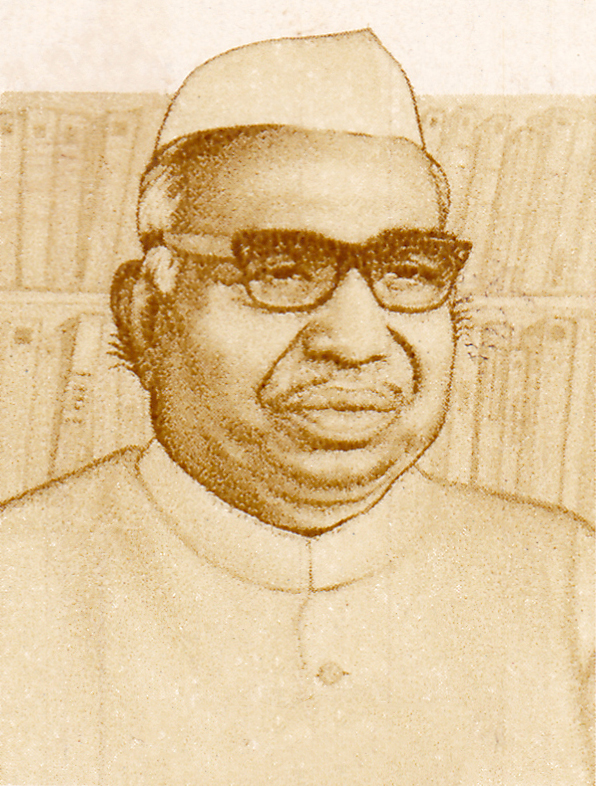
Babu Jagjivan Ram

- Babu Jagjivan Ram, 4th deputy prime minister of India, Indian freedom fighter and founder of Depressed Class Association

=== Speakers of the Lok Sabha ===
- G. M. C. Balayogi, 12th Speaker of the Lok Sabha and MP of Amalapuram
- Meira Kumar, 1st Woman Speaker of the Lok Sabha.
- Suraj Bhan, Deputy Speaker of Lok Sabha, Governor of Himachal Pradesh and UP, Bihar

=== Chief Ministers ===
S.no	Photo	Name	State	Remarks
1		Damodaram Sanjivayya	Andhra Pradesh	First Dalit Chief Minister of an Indian state.
2		Bhola Paswan Shastri	Bihar	First Dalit Chief Minister of Bihar.
3		Ram Sundar Das	Bihar	Former Chief Minister of Bihar.
4		Mayawati	Uttar Pradesh	First Dalit woman Chief Minister in India.
5		Jagannath Pahadia	Rajasthan	First Dalit Chief Minister of Rajasthan.
6		Sushilkumar Shinde	Maharashtra	First Dalit Chief Minister of Maharashtra.
7		Jitan Ram Manjhi	Bihar	Former Chief Minister of Bihar.
8		Charanjit Singh Channi	Punjab	First Dalit Sikh Chief Minister.

=== Governors ===
S.no	Photo	Name	State(s)	Remarks
1		Suraj Bhan	Uttar Pradesh Himachal Pradesh Bihar	Served as Governor of multiple Indian states and Deputy Speaker of Lok Sabha.
2		Buta Singh	Bihar	Former Union Home Minister; served as Governor of Bihar.
3		Ram Nath Kovind	Bihar	Served as Governor of Bihar (2015–2017); later became the 14th President of India.
4		Baby Rani Maurya	Uttarakhand	Served as Governor of Uttarakhand (2018–2021).
5		Thawar Chand Gehlot	Karnataka	Former Union Minister; appointed Governor of Karnataka in 2021.
6		R. S. Gavai	Bihar; Sikkim; Kerala	Former Governor of multiple Indian states; senior Dalit leader of the Republican Party of India.

=== Politicians ===
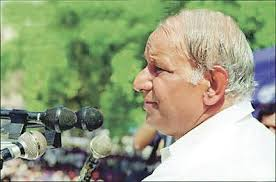
Bahujan Nayak Kanshi Ram

- Jogendra Nath Mandal, one of the central figures in creation of the state of Pakistan; later a government minister
- Dakshayani Velayudhan, Indian politician and the sole Dalit woman in the Constituent Assembly.
- Ram Vilas Paswan, 11 times Member of Parliament and many times Minister in the Union Government; founder and President of Lok Janshakti Party
- Ram Ratan Ram, Member of Parliament 1984-1989, MLA and Minister in Bihar State 1952-1984
- Kanshi Ram, founder of Bahujan Samaj Party, a Dalit leader and Bahujan Nayak of India
- Bangaru Laxman, former President of Bharatiya Janta Party
- Kirpa Ram Punia, Dalit leader, former IAS officer, and politician
- B. Shyam Sunder, founder of Bharatiya Bhim Sena
- Shambhavi Choudhary, Lok Sabha MP from Samastipur

== Religion and reform ==
- Chokhamela, poet and saint from Maharashtra, India during 13th–14th century
- Ravidas, Indian mystic poet-saint of the Bhakti movement during the 15th–16th century CE.
- Harichand Thakur, established the Matua sect of Vaishnavite Hinduism
- Swami Achhootanand, 20th century Indian social reformer, established the Adi Hindu movement.
- Marampudi Joji, third Archbishop of Hyderabad
- Gallela Prasad, fourth bishop of the Roman Catholic Diocese of Cuddapah, in the state of Andhra Pradesh in India

== See also ==
- List of Jatav
- Dalit Music
- Dalit Literature
- Dalit History Month
- Dalit activists
- Dalit saints
