= Raja Rao =

Indian-American English writer

- Born: 8 November 1908; Hassan, Kingdom of Mysore, British India (now in Karnataka, India)
- Died: 8 July 2006 (aged 97); Austin, Texas, USA
- Education: Osmania University; University of Madras, University of Montpellier; Sorbonne
- Occupations: Writer, professor
- Writing career
- Language: Kannada, French, English
- Period: 1938–1998
- Genres: Novel, short story, essay
- Notable works: Kanthapura (1938); The Serpent and the Rope (1960)
- Notable awards: Sahitya Academy Award (1964); Padma Bhushan (1969); Neustadt International Prize for Literature (1988); Padma Vibhushan (2007)
- Website: therajaraoendowment.org

Raja Rao (8 November 1908 – 8 July 2006) was an Indian-American writer of English-language novels and short stories, whose works are deeply rooted in metaphysics. Rao has been described as a powerful writer and a scholar well versed in the Hindu, Buddhist, and Christian philosophies. The Serpent and the Rope (1960), a semi-autobiographical novel recounting a search for spiritual truth in Europe and India, established him as one of the finest Indian prose stylists and won him the Sahitya Akademi Award in 1963. For the entire body of his work, Rao was awarded the Neustadt International Prize for Literature in 1988. Rao's wide-ranging body of work, spanning a number of genres, is seen as a varied and significant contribution to Indian English literature, as well as to World literature as a whole.

== Early life ==
Raja Rao was born on 8 November 1908 in Hassan, in the princely state of Mysore (now in Karnataka in South India) into a Kannadiga Hoysala Karnataka Brahmin family and was the eldest of 9 siblings, with seven sisters and a brother named Yogeshwara Ananda. His father, H.V. Krishnaswamy, taught Kannada, the regional language of Karnataka, and mathematics at Nizam College in Hyderabad. His mother, Gauramma, was a homemaker who died when Raja Rao was 4 years old.

The death of his mother when he was four left a lasting impression on the novelist – the absence of a mother and orphanhood are recurring themes in his work. Another influence from early life was his grandfather, with whom he lived in Hassan and Harihalli or Harohalli).

Rao was educated at a Muslim school, the Madarsa-e-Aliya in Hyderabad. After matriculation in 1927, he studied for his degree at Nizam's College. Osmania University, where he became friends with Ahmed Ali. He began learning French. After graduating from the University of Madras, having majored in English and history, he won the Asiatic Scholarship of the Government of Hydrabad in 1929, for studying abroad.

Rao moved to the University of Montpellier in France. He studied French language and literature, and later at the Sorbonne in Paris, he explored the Indian influence on Irish literature. He married Camille Mouly, who taught French at Montpellier, in 1931. The marriage lasted until 1939. Later he depicted the breakdown of their marriage in The Serpent and the Rope. Rao published his first stories in French and English. In 1931 to 1932, he contributed four articles written in Kannada for Jaya Karnataka, an influential journal.

== Nationalist novelist ==
Returning to India in 1939, he edited Changing India with Iqbal Singh, an anthology of modern Indian thought from Ram Mohan Roy to Jawaharlal Nehru. He participated in the Quit India Movement of 1942. In 1943–1944 he co-edited a journal from Bombay called Tomorrow with Ahmad Ali. He was a prime mover in the formation of cultural organisation Sri Vidya Samiti, devoted to reviving the values of ancient Indian civilisation.

Rao's involvement in the nationalist movement is reflected in his first two books. The novel Kanthapura (1938) was an account of the impact of Gandhi's teaching on nonviolent resistance against the British. Rao borrows the style and structure from Indian vernacular tales and folk-epics. He returned to the theme of Gandhism in the short story collection The Cow of the Barricades (1947). The Serpent and the Rope (1960) was written after a long silence, and dramatised the relationships between Indian and Western culture. The serpent in the title refers to illusion and the rope to reality. Cat and Shakespeare (1965) was a metaphysical comedy that answered philosophical questions posed in the earlier novels. He had great respect for women, and once said, "Women is the Earth, air, ether, sound, women is the microcosm of the mind".

== Later years ==
Rao relocated to the United States and was Professor of Philosophy at the University of Texas at Austin from 1966 to 1986, when he retired as emeritus Professor. Courses he taught included: Marxism to Gandhism; Mahayana Buddhism; Indian philosophy: The Upanishads; Indian philosophy: The Metaphysical Basis of the Male and Female Principle; and Razor's Edge.

In 1965, he married Katherine Jones, an American stage actress. They had one son, Christopher Rama. In 1986, after his divorce from Katherine, Rao married his third wife, Susan Vaught, whom he met when she was a student at the University of Texas in the 1970s. In 1988 he received the prestigious International Neustadt Prize for Literature. In 1998 he published Gandhi's biography Great Indian Way: A Life of Mahatma Gandhi.

Rao died of heart failure on 8 July 2006, at his home in Austin, Texas, at the age of 97.

== Raja Rao Award for Literature ==
The 'Raja Rao Award for Literature' was created in Rao's honor, and with his permission, in the year 2000. It was established "to recognize writers and scholars who have made an out standing contribution to the Literature and Culture of the South Asian Diaspora." The award was administered by the Samvad India Foundation, a nonprofit charitable trust named for the Sanskrit word for dialogue, which was established by Makarand Paranjape of Jawaharlal Nehru University in New Delhi to bestow the award and to promote education and cultural contributions to India and the South Asian diaspora. No cash prize was attached to the award during its existence. The Award was bestowed seven times between 2000 and 2009.

The inaugural recipient of the Award was K. S. Maniam of Malaysia, who was bestowed the award in 2000. Other recipients were Yasmine Gooneratne of Sri Lanka, Edwin Thumboo of Singapore, Harsha V. Dehejia of Canada, David Dabydeen of Guyana, Varadaraja V. Raman of the United States, and Vijay Mishra of Fiji. Meenakshi Mukherjee, chair of the last awarding jury, died in 2009, and the award was discontinued that same year, and has not since been bestowed.

Those who served as jurors for selection of the recipient included Meenakshi Mukherjee (chair), Braj Kachru, Victor Ramraj, and Makarand Paranjape

== Kanthapura ==
Raja Rao's first and best-known novel, Kanthapura (1938), is the story of a south Indian village named Kanthapura. The novel is narrated in the form of a Sthala Purana by an old woman of the village, Achakka. Dominant castes like Brahmins are privileged to get the best region of the village, while lower castes such as Pariahs are marginalized. Despite this classist system, the village retains its long-cherished traditions of festivals in which all castes interact and the villagers are united. The village is believed to be protected by a local deity named Kenchamma.

The main character of the novel, Moorthy, is a young Brahmin who leaves for the city to study, where he becomes familiar with Gandhian philosophy. He begins living a Gandhian lifestyle, wearing home-spun khaddar and discarded foreign clothes and speaking out against the caste system. This causes the village priest to turn against Moorthy and excommunicate him. Heartbroken to hear this, Moorthy's mother Narasamma dies. After this, Moorthy starts living with an educated widow, Rangamma, who is active in India's independence movement.

Moorthy is then invited by Brahmin clerks at the Skeffington coffee estate to create an awareness of Gandhian teachings among the pariah coolies. When Moorthy arrives, he is beaten by the policeman Bade Khan, but the coolies stand up for Moorthy and beat Bade Khan - an action for which they are thrown out of the estate. Moorthy continues his fight against injustice and social inequality and becomes a staunch ally of Gandhi. Although he is depressed over violence at the estate, he takes responsibility and goes on a three-day fast and emerges morally elated. A unit of the independence committee is formed in Kanthapura, with office bearers vowing to follow Gandhi's teachings under Moorthy's leadership.

The British government accuses Moorthy of provoking the townspeople to inflict violence and arrests him. Though the committee is willing to pay his bail, Moorthy refuses their money. While Moorthy spends the next three months in prison, the women of Kanthapura take charge, forming a volunteer corps under Rangamma's leadership. Rangamma instills a sense of patriotism among the women by telling them stories of notable women from Indian history. They face police brutality, including assault and rape, when the village is attacked and burned. Upon Moorthy's release from prison, he has lost his faith in Gandhian principles as he sees most of the land of his village has been sold to city dwellers of Bombay and the village has changed beyond repair.

== Reception ==
Raja Rao has been described as a powerful writer with a deeply metaphysical sensibility and as a scholar well versed with the primary texts of Hindu, Buddhist, and Christian philosophies. All of his novels explored philosophical themes, and his protagonists were all Brahmins well acquainted with Upanishads and had a quest for the absolute through the path of Jñāna or intellectual insight.

The literary works of Rao received high commendation by literary figures such as C. D. Narasimhaiah and Edwin Thumboo. His prose was described as being "scintillating poetry", and his mastery of the English and French languages, and his superabundant vocabulary have been particularly noted by critics.

== Bibliography ==
Fiction: Novels

- Kanthapura (1938), Orient Paperbacks ISBN 978-81-222010-5-5
- The Serpent and the Rope (1960), Penguin India ISBN 978-01-434223-3-4
- The Cat and Shakespeare: A Tale of India (1965) Penguin India ISBN 978-01-434223-2-7
- Comrade Kirillov (1976), Orient Paperbacks ISBN 978-08-657808-0-4
- The Chessmaster and His Moves (1988), Orient Paperbacks ISBN 978-81-709402-1-0

Fiction: Short story collections

- The Cow of the Barricades (1947)
- The Policeman and the Rose (1978)
- On the Ganga Ghat (1989), Orient Paperbacks (Vision Books) ISBN 978-81-709405-0-0

Non-fiction

- Changing India: An Anthology (1939)
- Tomorrow (1943–44)
- Whither India? (1948)
- The Meaning of India, essays (1996), Penguin India
- The Great Indian Way: A Life of Mahatma Gandhi, biography (1998), Orient Paperbacks ISBN 978-81-709430-8-2

Anthologies

- The Best of Raja Rao (1998)
- 5 Indian Masters (Raja Rao, Rabindranath Tagore, Premchand, Dr. Mulk Raj Anand, Khushwant Singh) (2003).
- Indian Ethos and Western Encounter in Raja Rao's Fiction - Editor : Dr. Madhulika Singh - Published by Rajmangal Publishers.

== Awards ==
- 1963: Sahitya Akademi Award
- 1969: Padma Bhushan, India's third highest civilian award
- 1988: Neustadt International Prize for Literature
- 2007: Padma Vibhushan, India's second highest civilian award

== See also ==
- List of Indian writers
- Katha Upanishad, ancient Hindu text containing the razor's edge metaphor used by Rao, and others:
  - For example, Somerset Maugham's novel, The Razor's Edge
