= Malvika Raj =

Indian artist and fashion designer

- Born: 18 September 1993 (age 32)
- Education: Northern India Institute of Fashion Technology, Mohali
- Known for: Art and Illustration
- Style: Madhubani

Malvika Raj is an Indian artist and fashion designer. She works in the Madhubani style of art. As a Dalit, she has used art to express her experiences with caste-based discrimination in India, and uses traditional techniques to express themes relating to Dalit identity and the Buddhist religion.

== Life ==
Raj is from Patna, Bihar, and studied at the Northern India Institute of Fashion Technology in Mohali, Punjab. Belonging to a Dalit family, she credits her family and her father particularly, for educating her about Dalit leadership, politics, and history in India, and the close links between Buddhism and Dalit identity.

== Career ==
Raj initially worked as a fashion designer in Delhi, but returned home to Patna for health-related reasons. While recuperating at home, she trained in Madhubani techniques with artist Ashok Biswas. She also learned traditional motifs and imagery used by Dalit women who made art in the Madhubani style in their homes, while visiting Samastipur in Bihar to continue her training.

Raj's recent illustration, titled 'Mai'

Raj's work is inspired by traditional Madhubani art, which originated from her home state of Bihar and was primarily created by women on mud walls, using rice flour paint in their homes. Raj's work focuses on an aspect of Madhubani art called 'Kobhar' (translating to 'honey forest'), and traditionally consists of images from nature used to decorate walls for wedding ceremonies. Speaking of her experiences in discrimination while studying Madhubani art, Raj said,

"Historically, the Tantric subset of Madhubani art has been something that only the Brahmins have been allowed to work on. During my trip, I met a Tantric artist and when I asked him if he could teach me the style, he outright refused because I’m a Dalit. When I replied to him saying that I could just study the technique enough and teach myself the art form, he said bad fate would befall me. Caste is so deeply entrenched in everyone’s minds that even a local Dalit artist asked me not to paint in the Tantric style because he feared for my life."

Raj has stated that this incident, among others, made her averse to depicting Hindu mythology in her art. Raj's work accordingly uses Madhubani techniques and styles, but her imagery draws from political and social aspects of the historical and ongoing discrimination faced by Dalits as a result of the caste system in India, from Buddhism and the history of Dalit conversion to that faith, as well as from Dalit political leaders and social reformers like B R. Ambedkar, and Savitribai Phule. She also paints scenes depicting Buddhist imagery, including events from the life of the Buddha, and has stated that her first painting depicted a scene from the Buddha's life. A portrait of Dr. B. R. Ambedkar made by Raj is on display in Edinburgh University. Raj has stated that she has described facing opposition for her subversion of religious themes in Madhubani art. Raj's work has been exhibited in India, at the Jehangir Art Gallery, Mumbai and the Indian Council for Cultural Relations and Lalit Kala Akademi in Delhi. In addition to art, Raj is also an entrepreneur who designs clothing which bear Madhubani motifs, and she also teaches rural woman to paint on dresses. Her work has been used as illustrations in articles on contemporary Dalit politics and identity in Outlook, and Mint. Raj has recently illustrated 'Savitribai Phule and I’, a book authored by Sangeeta Mulay.

== See also ==
- Sumeet Samos
- Somnath Waghmare
- Savindra Sawarkar
