= Dabydeen =

Dabydeen is a surname. Notable people with the surname include:

- Cyril Dabydeen (born 1945), Canadian writer
- David Dabydeen (born 1955), Guyanese writer
