= Himani =

Given name list

Himani is a given name. Notable people with the given name include:

- Himani Bannerji (born 1942), Indian-Canadian sociologist
- Himani Dalmia, Indian author
- Himani Kapoor (born 1988), Indian singer
- Himani Savarkar (1947–2015), Indian politician
- Himani Shah (born 1976), Nepalese princess
- Himani Shivpuri (born 1960), Indian actress

== Fictional characters ==
- Himani Singh, from the Disney sitcom Best of Luck Nikki (equivalent of Amy Duncan)
