= Savarkar (surname) =

Name list

Savarkar, also spelled as Sawarkar, is an Indian surname. It is primarily associated with Vinayak Damodar Savarkar (1883–1966), an Indian politician and ideologue who had formulated the Hindutva ideology in 1923.

Other notable figures with the surname include:

- Ganesh Damodar Savarkar (1879–1945), Indian politician and Hindutva activist
- Himani Savarkar (1947–2015), Indian politician and Hindutva activist
- Jayant Savarkar (1936–2023), Indian actor
- Randhir Pralhadrao Sawarkar (born 1973), Indian politician
- Savindra Sawarkar (born 1962), Indian artist
- Tekchand Sawarkar, Indian politician
