= Raja Rao Award =

Literary award for persons in the South Asian Diaspora

- Awarded for: Outstanding contribution to the Literature and Culture of the South Asian Diaspora
- Country: India
- Presented by: Samvad India Foundation and Jawaharlal Nehru University
- Reward: None.
- First award: 2000
- Final award: 2009
- Website: Raja Rao Award page

The Raja Rao Award, in some sources the Raja Rao Award for Literature, is a former literary award named in honour of expatriate Indian writer Raja Rao, and bestowed "to recognize writers and scholars who have made an outstanding contribution to the Literature and Culture of the South Asian Diaspora." It has been described as "prestigious", and "an important Indian literary prize". It was bestowed by a jury upon seven recipients between its establishment in 2000 and its cessation in 2009. The award was given annually from 2000 to 2004, after which it was given biennially, with one award being given for 2005-2006, and one being given for 2007-2008.

== Establishment and course ==
The award was instituted by the Samvad India Foundation, a nonprofit charitable trust named for the Sanskrit word for dialogue, which was co-founded by Makarand Paranjape, a professor of English at Jawaharlal Nehru University in New Delhi and Vijay Mishra, a professor of English and Comparative Literature at Murdoch University in Perth. Its purpose was to honour writers of Indian origin settled abroad, mainly those in South-East Asia, and to promote education and cultural contributions to India and the South Asian diaspora. It was named for Raja Rao, with his permission; Rao having been born in Mysore, Karnataka, India, and eventually moved first to France, and then to live for many decades in the United States. There is no cash prize attached to the award.

The inaugural recipient of the Award was K. S. Maniam, who was bestowed the award in 2000. One literary journal reported that "the 2000 Raja Rao Award that Maniam received in New Delhi was a definite boost to his international acclaim as a writer."

The second winner was Yasmine Gooneratne, whose international scholarship was described as being recognized with "Macquarie University's first higher doctoral degree (D.Litt.), the Order of Australia, and the Samvad India Foundation's Raja Rao Award which acknowledges authors who deal with the South Asian Diaspora in their literary work." The Sunday Times of Sri Lanka wrote of Gooneratne:

When Saraswati did come into Yasmine’s life... she took the form of the goddess Tara. When The Samvad India Foundation singled out Yasmine for the Raja Rao award in 2002, they made her a gift of the beautiful little figurine. This international prize celebrates writers and scholars who have made an outstanding contribution to the literature of the South Asian diaspora, and the honour delighted Yasmine even as it took her by surprise. “I never expected that the Indian writing establishment would regard me in that light,” she says.

Of the third recipient, Edwin Thumboo, who had previously been a juror for the award, the Pune Mirror wrote:

Among the awards he’s received are the National Book Development Council of Singapore’s Book Awards for Poetry (three times); the inaugural S.E.A. Write Award; Singapore’s first Cultural Medallion for Literature, and the Meritorious Services Medal. The Raja Rao Award he received in 2002 is very special to him, says Thumboo, who launched his country’s first National Poetry Festival in 2015.

Of the fifth winner, David Dabydeen, The Encyclopedia of Twentieth‐Century Fiction noted that he was the “winner of many awards including the 2004 Raja Rao Award for Literature and the 2008 Anthony N. Sabga Award for Literature -- the largest literary prize in the Caribbean.” Likewise, another source wrote:

Dabydeen is extremely highly decorated as a writer. The Anthony N Sabga Award was actually his second for 2008, having, a little more than two months ago, gone to India to receive the Hind Rattan (Jewel of India) Award presented by the Government of India. What is more, that was also his second recent Indian recognition, having been the winner of the 2004 Raja Rao Award, given in India for outstanding contribution to literature in the Indian diaspora.

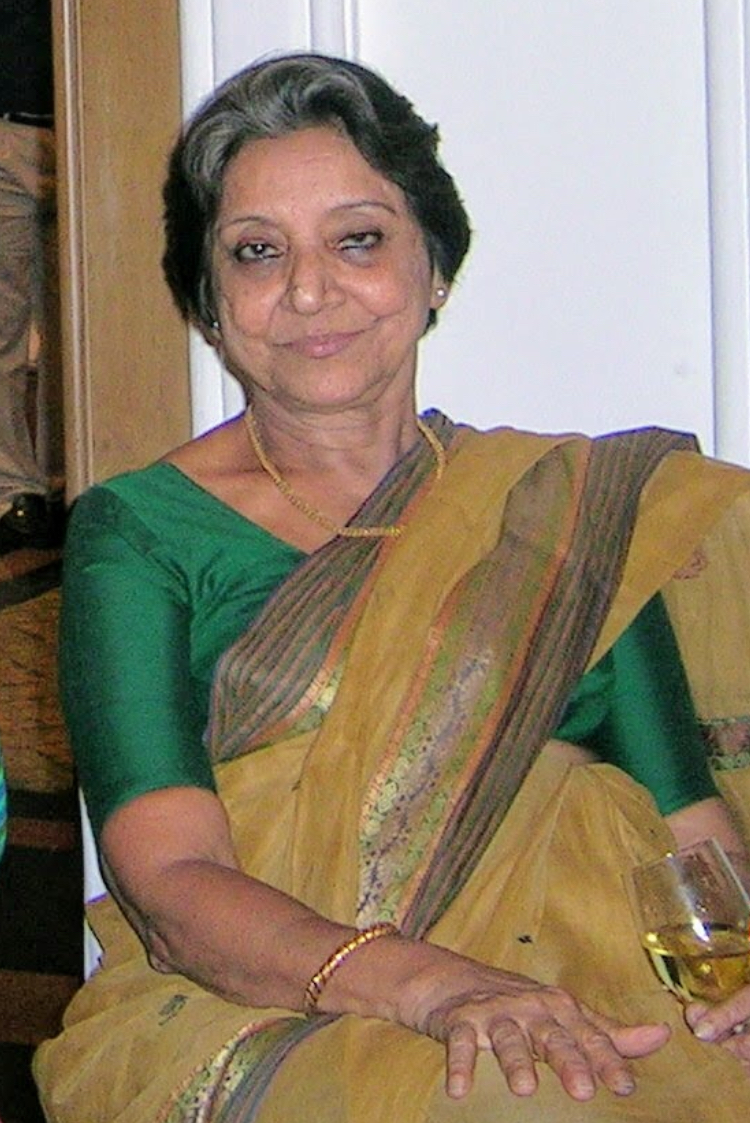
Meenakshi Mukherjee was chair of the last awarding jury in 2008

The Memoriam of Victor Ramraj, who served as a juror for the awarding of the honor, lauded his participation in committees “too numerous to mention individually”, but noted that “some of the most prestigious were his presidency of the Canadian Association for Commonwealth Language and Literature Studies (1992-95), his membership on the Commonwealth Literature Prize committee (1999-2001) and the Raja Rao Award for Literature of the South Asian Diaspora jury (2004)”.

Meenakshi Mukherjee, chair of the last awarding jury, died in 2009, and the award was discontinued that same year. As of 2025, it has not since been bestowed, and has been described as "discontinued". The last recipient of the award, Vijay Mishra, had also previously been a member of the board of advisors for the award.

== Recipients ==
The seven recipients were:

| Recipient | Year(s) | Country | References |
|---|---|---|---|
| K. S. Maniam | 2000 | Malaysia | |
| Yasmine Gooneratne | 2001 | Sri Lanka | |
| Edwin Thumboo | 2002 | Singapore | |
| Harsha V. Dehejia | 2003 | Canada | |
| David Dabydeen | 2004 | Guyana | |
| Varadaraja V. Raman | 2005–06 | United States | |
| Vijay Mishra | 2007–08 | Fiji | |

== Jurors ==
The award was bestowed by a three-member jury of "scholars of international standing". Those who served as jurors for selection of the recipient included:

- Meenakshi Mukherjee (Chair)
- Braj Kachru
- Victor Ramraj
- Makarand Paranjape
- Edwin Thumboo

In addition, an International Advisory Board was assembled, generally including some members of the jury as well as other scholars, with the initial board also including Ritu Menon, Malashri Lal, Alastair Niven, and Vijay Mishra.
