= Journey of a Nation =

Indian sports book

Journey of a nation: 75 years of Indian sports Game, Guts, Glory
- First edition
- Author: Chandresh Narayanan
- Language: English
- Publisher: Rupa Publications
- Publication place: India

Journey of a nation: 75 years of Indian sports Game, Guts, Glory is an Indian book about sports which is written by Chandresh Narayanan. It is published by Rupa Publications.

== Reception ==
The Hindu wrote in a review "Chandresh Narayanan’s book, 75 Years of Indian Sports: Game, Guts, Glory, a journalistic recitation of India’s sports since Independence, is timely, detailing the ‘what’ but falling short of the ‘why’ and ‘how’ ".

The Print wrote in a review "The book is a history of the nation’s development as a sporting nation and also the journey of its athletes – from being enthusiasts of a particular game to becoming internationally recognised champions".

Scroll.in wrote in a review "75 Years of Indian Sports is the story of India as a sporting nation and the journey of amateur athletes to becoming world champions".
