= The Death and Afterlife of Mahatma Gandhi =

2014 book by Makarand Paranjape

- Author: Makarand Paranjape
- Language: Indian English
- Publication place: India

The Death and Afterlife of Mahatma Gandhi is a 2014 non-fiction book by Indian writer Makarand Paranjape and published by Penguin Random House. The book is based on the analysis of Assassination of Mahatma Gandhi and the situations after his assassination.

== Publication ==
The book is written by the author and professor Makarand R Paranjape and it is published by Penguin Random House, India. Book contains 331 pages.

== Reception ==
Gandhian scholar Tridip Suhrud praised the work in his review for India Today magazine. Paranjape, according to Suhurd, wishes to scrutiny the memories related to Mahatma Gandhi's assassination and our representations of Mahatma. "His [Paranjape's] scholastic and impassioned inquiry", Suhrud wrote, "results in a work of immense significance for our understanding of the placement of political assassination in the political culture of India."

Sukumar Muralidharan, fellow at Indian Institute of Advanced Study, reviewed the book for Business Line. According to him, author "successfully established the particularity of the stigma in parricide in the Hindu context, excavating the epics to argue that it remains a rarity." "In the face of brazen celebrations," Muralidharan wrote, "of Gandhi’s assassination at the public stage today, scholar Makarand Paranjape’s book puts the leader back on a place that is his alone."

Chirosree Basu, over a review in Telegraph India, wrote that Paranjape "undoubtedly made a path-breaking study in an area that was thought to have been done to death". He added that author forces the reader to look at the assassination and what does it symbolise. However, according to Basu, Paranjape's work seems to be unnecessary exploration of "Schizoanalysis" and author gives back-handed advantage to the Godse's followers and deluded souls.

Bureau of Free Press Journal wrote that author used previously unseen historical documents to reconstruct Gandhi's assassination. It added that author has sought to look into the fuller ramifications of Gandhi's death. Dilip Simeon, writing for the Indian Express, compared Mahatma Gandhi's life as compass and how to use it is on us. Additionally, he wrote that Paranjape courageously took the efforts to present it before us. "Given Paranjape’s call for truthfulness," wrote Simeon, "the Sangh’s violent activities required attention."

== See also ==
- Hindutva and Hind Swaraj
