= Dalit music =

Music made by Dalit people in India

Dalit music or Bahujan music is music created, produced, or inspired by Bahujans and Dalits, people often discriminated against on the basis of caste, including Dalit rock, Bhim rap and Dalit pop as well as the music genres of the Ravidasis, including Chamar pop, Bhim Palana, Bhim geet and Punjabi Ambedkarite music.

== Background ==
Music is especially important to Dalits as it is an expression of their protest, folk tales and assertion. In Maharashtra, Dalit shahirs the singers and writers mostly creating content of Ambedkarite ideology and against caste oppression.

In Nepal, Dalit musicians are known as Naumati Baaja musicians. In Punjab, Chamar pop movement was started by Kanshi Ram to popularize the BAMCEF launched in 1978. In Tamil Nadu, Parais are used by dalits to express through music.

== Artists ==
- The Casteless Collective
- Amar Singh Chamkila, Punjabi singer, songwriter, musician, performer and composer.
- Hans Raj Hans, Punjabi folk and sufi singer, M.P of North West Delhi
- Navraj Hans, Punjabi singer, actor, entrepreneur and performer
- Yuvraj Hans, Punjabi singer and actor
- Jitendra Haripal, Sambalpuri folk singer
- Kanth Kaler, Punjabi folk singer
- Kishore Kumar 'Pagla'
- Ginni Mahi, Punjabi folk singer, rapper and stage performer
- Mooralala Marwada, Sufi folk singer
- Daler Mehndi, Punjabi Dalit singer
- Mukund Nayak, folk singer, songwriter and Jhumair dancer.
- Nandlal Nayak, folk artist, music composer and Nagpuri film director.
- Miss Pooja, Punjabi Bhangra artist and singer
- Manjit Rupowalia, Punjabi singer
- Sumeet Samos, rapper and singer
- Sheetal Sathe, folk singer, poet, and Dalit rights activist

== See also ==
- Mirasi
- Dalit literature
- Chamar
- Black music
- Dalit
