= Dehejia =

Dehejia is an Indian surname:

- Vidya Dehejia, professor of Indian and South Asian Art at Columbia University
- Rajeev Dehejia, professor of public policy in the Robert F. Wagner Graduate School of Public Service at New York University
- Harsha V. Dehejia (born c. 1938), allergist, author, and radio host, and Professor of Indian Studies at Carleton University
