= Usha Narayanan (author) =

Indian writer

- Occupation: Author
- Writing career
- Genres: Thriller-fiction; Mythology; Romance
- Notable works: Pradyumna: Son of Krishna; The Madras Mangler
- Website: www.ushanarayanan.com

Usha Narayanan is an Indian writer in the thriller-fiction, mythology and romance genre and best known for her novels Pradyumna: Son of Krishna and The Madras Mangler.

== Biography ==
She has a gold medal in English Literature from the University of Madras. She has done a writing course from Hawaii. She did various jobs like an English teacher, a creative director in an ad agency and radio station before becoming an author. She debuted through the novel The Madras Mangler. Her first foray into mythology was with "Pradyumna: Son of Krishna." The Hindu says of the novel, "Fascinated by this little-known or written about mythological hero, Usha’s latest book explores his journey, from being just another man to discovering his legacy and the rise of this swashbuckling hero."

In 2018, she released a book titled Awaken the Durga Within : From Glum to Glam Caged to Carefree. ShethepeopleTV called it "[The book] is a handy, easy-to-follow guide to help every woman assert themselves at home and work and reclaim their life". "A book to inspire modern Indian women," says DT Next.

Also published in 2018 was the novel, Kartikeya and His Battle with the Soul Stealer. Youth Ki Awaaaz says that the book "makes for a riveting read as it records the bildungsroman of Kartikeya and his growth in the process of finding the true purpose of his life."

Her Prem Purana: Mythological Love Stories "keeps the candle of hope burning for all who believe in the possibility of love," says The Free Press Journal.

Her other books include Doctor Stalker Spy, The Secret of God's Son and Love, Lies and Layoffs.

== Bibliography ==
- Narayanan, Usha (20 October 2018). Awaken the Durga Within. Rupa. ISBN 978-93-5304-766-5.
- Narayanan, Usha (15 March 2024). Kartikeya and His Battle with the Soul Stealer. Penguin Random House India. ISBN 978-01-4344-009-3.
- Narayanan, Usha (15 March 2024). Prem Purana: Mythological Love Stories. Penguin Random House India. ISBN 978-0-14-344008-6.
- Narayanan, Usha (June 2016). The Secret of God's Son. Penguin Books Limited. ISBN 978-0-14-342417-8.
- Narayanan, Usha (23 September 2015). Love, Lies and Layoffs. Harlequin. ISBN 9789351067931.
- Narayanan, Usha (15 March 2024). Pradyumna: Son of Krishna. Penguin Metro Reads. ISBN 978-0-14-342416-1.
- Narayanan, Usha (5 January 2014). The Madras Mangler. Leadstart Publishing. ISBN 9789382473640.
