= Hindutva and Hind Swaraj: History's Forgotten Doubles =

2025 book by Makarand Paranjape

- Author: Makarand Paranjape
- Subject: Political Philosophy
- Publication date: September 2025
- Pages: 392
- ISBN: 9780143477105
- Website: https://www.penguin.co.in/book/hindutva-and-hind-swaraj/

Hindutva and Hind Swaraj: History’s Forgotten Doubles is a book by Makarand R Paranjape, published by Penguin Random House in 2025. The book focuses on ideological differences between Mahatma Gandhi and Vinayak Damodar Savarkar. The author argues that the contrasting ideas of Hindutva and Hind Swaraj continue to carve and shape the sociopolitical landscape of the country. The book supports the idea of decolonisation and nationhood.

== About ==
The book is published by Penguin Random House in 2025, and it has three parts. The first part of the book deliberates the challenges of chronicling India's history while the second part emphasises on the civilisational identity. The third part discusses the current state of affairs including the heated debate on ideas of Gandhi and Savarkar on Indian nationhood.

== Reception ==
Ragini Kapoor, reviewing for Journal of Indian Knowledge Systems published by Brill Publishers, calls the book ‘profoundly contemplative, intellectually provocative, and rooted intervention in contemporary India.' Soumya Bhowmick, writing for The New Indian Express, praised the book and called the book's central thesis 'provocative and necessary'. She also called Paranjape's prose 'scholarly yet accessible' and the book's greatest strength in 'refusal of false equivalence.' Writing for The Millennium Post, Sanjeev Chopra called the book's structure 'interesting' and praised the book.

== See also ==
- The Death and Afterlife of Mahatma Gandhi
