= Body Offering =

Body Offering may refer to:

- Body Offering (novel), 2013 novel by Makarand Paranjape
- "Body Offering", a 2008 single by The Alice Rose
