= Kapish Mehra =

Indian publishing executive

- Occupation: Publishing executive
- Parent: R.K Mehra

Kapish Mehra is an Indian publishing executive. He is the Managing Director of Rupa & Co (Rupa Publications), one of India’s oldest trade publishing houses. Kapish entered the business when he was 17, and after completing his studies joined full-time at Rupa.
