= The Serpent and the Rope =

1960 novel by Raja Rao

- First edition
- Author: Raja Rao
- Publisher: John Murray
- Publication date: 1960
- Publication place: India
- Media type: Print
- ISBN: 9780143422334
- OCLC: 609467549
- Dewey Decimal: 823.91
- LC Class: PZ3.R1369 Se

The Serpent and the Rope is Raja Rao's second novel. It was first published in 1960 by John Murray. Written in an autobiographical style, the novel deals with the concepts of existence, reality and fulfillment of one's capabilities. The protagonist Ramaswamy's thought process in the novel is said to be influenced by vedantic philosophy and Adi Shankara's non-dualism. It also deals with the problems of the immigrants and immigration.

The novel won the Sahitya Akademi Award in 1964.

== Plot summary ==
This is a semi autobiographical novel. It describes Ramaswamy's search and quest for truth and self knowledge.

Ramaswamy is a kind young man. He is somewhat frail because of his tubercular lungs. While studying in France, he has married Madeleine, a French woman. Now Ramaswamy is looking to finish his thesis on Albigensian heresy and then move back to India. In the beginning, Ramaswamy gives hints that his relation with his wife is not going so well. Their married life has some concerns about their mutual understanding. Their first child, a son, has died just after seven months of its birth. Now, his father is on the verge of death. For this, he must return to India.

He returns to India though his wife remains there in France. In India, he has a stepmother who has served his father till his death. He calls her as 'Little Mother'. He and his mother attend rituals and ceremonies. They go on a pilgrimage to holy places as part of it. Having performed all ceremonial duties of a son, he goes back to France to be with his wife.

Ramaswamy is longing to understand himself and his life in a better way especially about his incompleteness within himself. During the trip to France, he meets Savithri, a Cambridge student. She is engaged to one of his friends. She confesses to him that she is not in love with the man. Initially, he considers her to be a modern sort of woman and does not think highly of her. Despite this fact, he is not able to keep her away from his thoughts. Reaching home, he feels himself to be more distant from his wife than ever. At their first dinner together after his return, Madeleine, too realizing a change in him, asks him if she has failed his gods somehow. He replies that she has not failed his gods, but she has failed him. His mother had given him the toe rings to be bestowed upon Madeleine as blessings. But now he feels so distant to her that he cannot give her the gift. He realizes that things have gone too far now. He no longer sees her as his beloved wife. One reason contributing to this situation is his desire for Savithri. Eventually his mind becomes so much obsessed with her thoughts that it starts to hurt his married life. His relation with his wife becomes even more tense and complicated as his own situation with introduction of Savithri in his life.

Savithri visits him and Madeleine in France. Ramaswamy accompanies her to England in order to complete his research thesis. They spend time together and he realizes his deep love for her. At the same time, he is not able to express his love since he is already married. He gifts her those toe rings instead and she accepts. This marks a great significance in their relationship. On the other hand, Madeleine is pregnant with their second baby. But he has to leave for India to attend his sister's wedding. Due to his declining health, he has to make an emergency visit to Bangalore. While he is there, he gets to know that Madeleine gave birth prematurely to a second son who has died. Later he also learns that Savithri has got married. Now he goes back to France. She has become a Buddhist and draws herself completely away from her husband.

Ramaswamy goes to London for lung surgery. Savithri visits him. They accept it as their fate and resolve to part in their ways. They acknowledge that the true love is about rejoicing in one another’s happiness. Madeleine divorces Ramaswamy. He realizes that the answer he has been seeking lies in the journey to seek out his Guru, and that all of the trials and tribulations of his life have led him to this realization.

== Bibliography ==
- Gupta, Ramesh Kumar (1 January 2002). "Ontological Entity in The Serpent and The Rope". In K. V. Surendran (ed.). Indian Literature in English: New Perspectives. Sarup & Sons. pp. 24–31. ISBN 9788176252492. OCLC 52263671.
- Piciucco, Pier Paolo (2001). "In Between The Serpent and the Rope". In Rajeshwar Mittapalli, Pier Paolo Piciucco (ed.). The Fiction of Raja Rao: Critical Studies. Atlantic Publishers & Distributors. pp. 179–185. ISBN 9788126900183. OCLC 50117094.
- Dayal, P (1986). Raja Rao. Atlantic Publishers & Distributors. OCLC 24909983.
- Sharma, Kaushal (2005). Raja Rao: A Study of his Themes and Technique. Sarup & Sons. ISBN 9788176256179. OCLC 297507382.
- Rao, A. Sudhakar (1999). Socio-cultural Aspects of Life in the Selected Novels of Raja Rao. Atlantic Publishers & Distributors. ISBN 9788171568291.
- Powers, Janet M. (2003). "Raja Rao (1910– )". In Jaina C. Sanga (ed.). South Asian Novelists in English: An A-to-Z Guide. Greenwood Publishing Group. ISBN 9780313318856. OCLC 608576912.
