= My Country My Life =

2008 autobiography by Lal Krishna Advani

My Country, My Life
- First edition
- Author: Lal Krishna Advani
- Language: English
- Subject: Autobiography
- Publisher: Rupa & Co
- Publication date: March 19, 2008 (hardback)
- Publication place: India
- Pages: 1040
- ISBN: 978-81-291-1363-4
- OCLC: 221287960
- LC Class: DS481.A28 A66 2008

My Country My Life is an autobiographical book by L. K. Advani, an Indian politician who served as the Deputy Prime Minister of India from 2002 to 2004, and was the Leader of the Opposition in the 15th Lok Sabha. The book was released on 19 March 2008 by Abdul Kalam, the eleventh President of India. The book has 1,040 pages and narrates autobiographical accounts and events in the life of Advani. It became the best seller book in the non-fiction category and Advani joined Archer as a bestseller author. The book website claims the book sold an excess of 1,000,000 copies. The book alongside mentions the event in Indian politics and India's history from 1900 till date.

== Summary and themes ==
My Country My Life is a selfportrait of India's leading political personality — L.K. Advani. This book covers, chronologically, most of all the major and minor events in the life of Advani. My Country My Life presents L.K. Advani's memoirs in five phases.

=== Phase One - Sindh and India - An unbreakable bond (1927-47) ===
It describes Advani's early life in Sindh, narrating the heart-rending story of India's blood-soaked partition into two separate countries — India and Pakistan — when Britain's colonial rule came to an end. He was one of the millions of people who migrated from Pakistan to India. After giving a fascinating socio-spiritual history of Sindh, Advani describes his life at home and school in Karachi (which he calls his ‘favourite city’). He also writes about two transformative influences on his life: the Rashtriya Swayamsevak Sangh (RSS), a nationalist organization which he joined as a swayamsevak (volunteer) at the age of 14, and Swami Ranganathananda, head of the Ramakrishna Math in Karachi and an erudite exponent of the philosophy of Swami Vivekananda, whom Advani first met in Karachi.

=== Phase Two - Journey from Sindh to Rajasthan (1947-57) ===
It deals with Advani's life as an RSS pracharak (organiser) in Rajasthan and as an activist of the Bharatiya Jana Sangh. An important section in this phase deals with the mutually respectful relationship between Mahatma Gandhi and the RSS. Advani defends the RSS against allegations of its complicity in the murder of Gandhi.

=== Phase Three - Entry into National Politics (1957-77) ===
It deals with Advani's evolution as a political leader in New Delhi. 'I was asked,' he writes, 'by Pandit Deendayal Upadhyaya, the main ideologue, guide and organiser of the Jana Sangh, to shift my base to Delhi and work as a political aide to Atal Bihari Vajpayee, who had just been elected to the Lok Sabha for the first time. It is during these two decades that I gained advanced experience in political organisation, political strategy and leadership.' A particularly riveting section in this phase is the description of the imposition of the draconian Emergency Rule by the then Prime Minister of India, Indira Gandhi, in June 1975. Along with tens of thousands of pro-democracy leaders and activists belonging to Opposition parties, Advani spent nineteen months in jail. This phase describes, at considerable length, the sad saga of the Emergency and the thrilling tale of the triumph of democracy. It also demonstrates how the then prime minister, Indira Gandhi tried to destroy the basic structure of the Constitution, a wrongdoing which her party, the Indian National Congress, has never honestly debated or apologized for.

=== Phase Four - BJP's Spectacular Rise (1977-97) ===
It is the period when Advani emerged as an important national leader. It describes his work in Parliament, and also as the Minister of Information & Broadcasting in the Janata Government (1977–79), in dismantling the legal edifice of dictatorship created during the Emergency. It also provides an account of the disintegration of the Janata Party and the formation of the Bharatiya Janata Party (BJP). A section of this phase is a narration of the BJP's active participation in the movement for the reconstruction of the Ram Temple in Ayodhya. Advani writes: ‘(It) soon snowballed into the largest mass movement in the history of independent India. The spectacular public response to my Ram Rath Yatra from Somnath to Ayodhya in September–October 1990 far exceeded my own expectations. Just as the struggle against the Emergency opened my eyes to the Indian people’s unflinching faith in democracy, the Ayodhya movement opened my eyes to the deep-rooted influence of religion in the lives of Hindus of all castes and sects across the country. The phase ends with a captivating narration of another important political campaign in Advani’s life — the Swarna Jayanti Rath Yatra, which marked the Golden Jubilee of India’s Independence.

=== Phase Five - India: Strong & Self Confident (1997-2007) ===
It is a period of major accomplishments in Advani’s political career. The BJP’s rise, since 1989, culminated in the formation, in March 1998, of the first truly non-Congress coalition government at the Centre under Atal Bihari Vajpayee’s leadership. After a renewed mandate in 1999, the government of the BJP-led National Democratic Alliance (NDA), served the nation with dedication and distinction for six years.

This phase also provides a candid and self-critical assessment of the unanticipated defeat of the NDA in the May 2004 parliamentary elections. ‘I have not the slightest doubt,’ Advani says, ‘that, as in the past, the BJP will bounce back again.’ The highlights of this part of the book are the Vajpayee government's determined fight against Pakistan-supported cross-border terrorism fueled by religious extremism, India's triumph in the Kargil War, the Vajpayee-Advani duo's efforts to normalise relations with Pakistan, the hopes and frustrations at the Agra Summit between Vajpayee and General Pervez Musharraf, and Advani's historic journey to Pakistan in June 2005. About the controversy generated by this visit, he says, ‘I have no regrets.’

=== Controversies ===
1. Advani in 1996 had to resign as a Lok Sabha Member after he was alleged in the Jain Hawala Diaries. He was reported to have received money from them.

== Reaction ==
Writing in the Hindustan Times, Vir Sanghvi remarks that the book is a significant note for what it says, but for what it doesn't. He says, "Advani’s strengths and weaknesses are captured in his new book, My Country My Life, (Rupa). It is a readable, rewarding and often racy account of his political career. Written from the heart, it is part-memoir and part-manifesto".

Lata Jagtiani in her detailed book review says: "One may or may not agree with the BJP’s view of the direction that India should take in the future, but there are no two opinions, after reading the autobiography, that there are very few in Indian politics with the mettle and character of Advani. Perhaps this book will serve as an inspiration to many who are deeply for the nation but don’t know the high cost and also the high value of power".
