= Body Offering (novel) =

2013 novel by Makarand Paranjape

- Author: Makarand Paranjape
- Language: English
- Publisher: Rupa Publications
- Publication date: May 2013
- Publication place: India
- ISBN: 978-81-291-2086-1

Body Offering is an English-language novel written by Makarand Paranjape and published by Rupa Publications in 2013. It is Paranjape's second novel and tells the story of a middle-aged surgeon's extra-marital affair with a younger woman. The book received generally negative reviews from critics.

== Synopsis ==
Sunayana "Nayan" Sen is an editor working at a book publishing house who begins a liaison with Ashok Sube, a middle-aged surgeon. As their relationship progresses, they attempt to move beyond their own complicated pasts: Ashok's wife left him and fled with their little daughter, though they are not yet legally separated, and Nayan's self-harm that resulted from her past failed relationships. The book ends with a love letter in which Ashok proposes to Nayan and asks her to be his lover and editor.

== Background and publication ==
Body Offering is the second novel by Makarand Paranjape, following The Narrator (1995). Paranjape, an English professor at Jawaharlal Nehru University, named the English writer and poet D. H. Lawrence as an inspiration for the novel, praising Lawrence's explorations of "human relationships, social change and class conflict". In an interview with The Hindu, Paranjape rejected classifications of Body Offering as erotica, which he described as a "recent marketing gimmick". The 364-page paperback book was published by Rupa Publications in May 2013.

== Themes ==
The novel explores themes of identity and discrimination. As the son of a Dalit man and a Brahmin woman, Ashok has been unsure of his identity since he was young. Paranjape uses his status to comment on the impact of the Indian caste system on people's lives. In her analysis of Body Offering, the linguist Nimmi Nalika Menike described Ashok as a victim of this system, pointing to "the real problem of discrimination and exclusion" in society. According to Menike, Paranjape's exploration is not an attempt to restructure society, but rather an investigation of why the structural discrimination is so longstanding: his reasoning being that "each group instead tries to protect and legitimize" the caste system for its own benefit.

== Reception ==
Body Offering received generally negative reviews from critics. In a review for Deccan Herald, Monideepa Sahu described Paranjape's portrayal of the characters as realistic, though somewhat stereotypical, and criticised his writing style as "uneven". She felt that some passages in the book were descriptive while others were "cluttered with irrelevant details". Several critics commented negatively on the novel's references to other romance-genre works such as the 1972 film Last Tango in Paris. Aditya Mani Jha of The Sunday Guardian wrote that these references were "tedious" and "half-baked". He observed some similarities between Body Offering and the 1955 novel Lolita, by Vladimir Nabokov, but felt that it was not an effective novel due to its "awkward, academic, clumsy-sounding characters", and ultimately declared it "more erratic than erotic".

A reviewer for The Telegraph praised Paranjape's writing style, including his incorporation of letters and poems in the text, but criticised some of its social commentary on environmental activism as a distraction. Shashi Baliga of The Hindu agreed that it contained excessive analysis and debates between the characters, writing that Paranjape is "sometimes guilty of over-analysis when he could let his characters' emotions take their own course". She concluded that Nayan was a particularly compelling and realistic character but that the ending was ultimately "underwhelming".
