= Northern India Institute of Fashion Technology =

Fashion school in based in Mohali, India

Northern India Institute Of Fashion Technology
- Type: Public
- Established: 1995
- Location: Mohali (Headquarters), Punjab, India
- Campus: Urban
- Nickname: NIIFT
- Website: www.niiftindia.com

Northern India Institute of Fashion Technology (NIIFT) is a fashion institute in Mohali with its branches in Jalandhar & Ludhiana in the state of Punjab. It was set up in 1995.

== Academic programmes ==
The regular, full-time programs at NIIFT are run at two levels namely the Graduate level and the Post Graduate level, however, NIIFT has also recently launched its PhD program.

- Fashion Design

Fashion Design is a three-year undergraduate diploma program. It is available in Mohali, Ludhiana & Jalandhar. The course specialises in design development skills, fashion presentation, market knowledge and trend forecasting. The students, in the final semester, put up their collection on ramp in the annual fashion show of the college, Anukama. The show is choreographed show by professional choreographer. Popular models like Krishna Somani, Amanpreet Wahi, Joey Mathews to name a few, walk on ramp featuring the work of the students.

- Textile Design

It is a three-year undergraduate diploma program. The course offered by NIIFT as a specialization in textiles, prints, fabric development, weaves, surface embellishments and garment construction. The final year students, put up artistic talent and scientific frame of mind at SUVAYAN, the annual textile design exhibition.

- Knitwear Design

This is a post-graduate diploma programme of two years.

- Garment Manufacturing Technology

This is a post-graduate diploma programme of two years. It is available in Mohali.

- Fashion Retail Management

== Merger of NIIFT with NIFT ==
Punjab Chief Minister Parkash Singh Badal on the behalf of The Punjab Government gave approval to the merger of Northern Indian Institute of Fashion Technology, Mohali (NIIFT) and its centers at Ludhiana and Jalandhar with National Institute of Fashion Technology, Delhi (NIFT) in 2010. For this, a sum of Rs. 48 crores over a period of three years was sanctioned to NIFT

== Notable alumni ==
- Malvika Raj
