= Patricia Rodney =

American advocate for and professor of public health

Patricia Rodney is a public health professional and the CEO of Partners in Health, Education and Development, a public health consultancy organization the works in the United States and internationally, and the chair of the board of directors of the nonprofit Walter Rodney Foundation, which she helped found in 2006 in memory of her husband. The foundation, which has its headquarters in Atlanta, Georgia, promotes education, health, and human development from a social justice perspective, and aims to improve lives and develop human resources through scholarship.

== Personal life ==
Before her life in advocacy, Rodney studied as a nurse. She married Guyanese scholar and social activist Walter Rodney in 1965, London, England, and had three children with him, Shaka, Kanini, and Asha, the first in England and the latter two in Tanzania.

=== Walter Rodney ===
Walter Rodney was a public speaker about the role of West Indians and other immigrants to England and their contributions to the United Kingdom. He campaigned for the working class rights and bottom-up community engagement, which he continued in Guyana, where he was denied a faculty position at the University of Guyana in 1974 on the intervention of the Guyana Government under the leadership of the Prime Minister Forbes Burnham. From 1974-1980 the family was harassed and under constant surveillance by police searches, extending to friends, relatives, and the children. Due to bomb threat Patricia and Walter were forced to stay at safe houses while their children stayed with relatives and friends. On 13 June 1980, a bomb exploded in Walter's car, killing him.

Patricia and her children moved to Barbados less than three weeks later. She was committed to staying in the Caribbean to give her children a sense of pride and confidence in their heritage, and chose Barbados the most politically stable Caribbean country and close friends. She was cognizant that her children needed her constant presence and was selective when seeking employment that it coincided with her children's schooling. She raised their three as a single parent. Due to deliberate machinations by the government in naming his assassination as "death by misadventure", she was unable to collect his life insurance.

On 20 October 2014, Patricia testified before the Commission Of Inquiry (COI) into the death of Walter Rodney.

== Independent career ==
Health is not just about diet and exercise. It is the nourishment of the body, the mind and the spirit. It includes how we see ourselves as a people. It is our traditions and culture. It includes our confidence and consciousness.

— Patricia Rodney, UNFPA

Rodney's career has spanned more than 40 years across Africa, the Caribbean, and North America. She worked as an academic and mentor to international public health professionals, and was a professor and assistant dean for public health education at the Morehouse School of Medicine for 15 years.

Patricia Rodney presented the 2019 Walter Rodney Lecture, "Living with a Legacy: My Journey with Walter Rodney", at the Yesu Persaud Centre for Caribbean Studies, University of Warwick.

She has been the CEO of Partners in Health, Education and Development (PHEAD) since 2011. As of 2019, she is an adjunct professor in the Department of Community Health & Preventive Medicine at the Morehouse School of Medicine.

Rodney is the author of The Caribbean State, Health Care and Women: An Analysis of Barbados and Grenada During the 1979-1983 Period.
