= Vijay Mishra =

Fijian-Australian cultural theorist

- Born: 4 May 1945 (age 81); Suva, Fiji
- Occupations: Academic, author, cultural theorist
- Employers: Ministry of Education, Fiji; Murdoch University; University of Alberta
- Known for: Literary and cultural studies, postcolonial theory, diaspora studies
- Spouse: Nalini Singh
- Children: Rohan Mishra; Paras Meates
- Parent(s): Hari Mishra; Lila Mishra

Vijay Chandra Mishra (born 4 May 1945) is a Fijian-Australian academic, author, and cultural theorist. He is an emeritus professor of English and Comparative Literature at Murdoch University, where he served as a professor from 1998 until his retirement in 2020. His research concentrates on Australian and postcolonial literatures, cultural and critical theory, Indian diaspora studies, film theory, and 18th-century English literature.

== Early life and education ==
Vijay Chandra Mishra was born in Suva, Fiji, on 4 May 1945. His father was the grandson of an indentured labourer on the maternal side. He grew up in Dilkusha, where his father taught primary school. His family spoke Fiji Hindi at home, and he learned English after starting school. He is fluent in English, Hindi, Fijian, and Fiji Hindi. He has reading competency in Sanskrit, Old and Middle English, French, and German.

Mishra attended Lelean Memorial School from 1958 to 1961, earning a First Division pass on the Cambridge Higher School Certificate. He enrolled at Suva Grammar School for his New Zealand University Entrance examination. He departed Fiji in February 1964.

He received a scholarship to study at Victoria University of Wellington, completing a Bachelor of Arts in English and History in 1967. The same year, he earned a Diploma in Teaching from Christchurch Teachers' College.

He completed coursework toward a Master of Arts in linguistics and earned a Bachelor of Arts with first-class honors in English literature at Macquarie University in 1971. In 1976, he gained a Master of Arts in English literature from the University of Sydney. Mishra completed a PhD in medieval Indian aesthetics and poetics at the Australian National University in 1981, followed by a DPhil in English literature at the University of Oxford in 1989.

== Career ==
Mishra taught at Labasa College from 1968 to 1969. In 1972, he became Senior Education Officer for English curriculum development in the Fiji Ministry of Education. He resigned in 1974 to move to Australia.

In 1976, Mishra joined Murdoch University in Perth as a tutor in World Literature. He left the university in 1978 to undertake his PhD at the Australian National University, returning to Murdoch as a lecturer after its completion. He subsequently left to complete his doctoral studies at the University of Oxford. He served as a professor of English at the University of Alberta in Canada. He became professor of English and Comparative Literature at Murdoch University in 1998, holding this post until his retirement in 2020.

Between 2010 and 2015, Mishra served as an Australian Research Council Professorial Fellow. He held visiting academic appointments at several institutions, including the University of Wales (1989), University of California, Santa Cruz (1993, 1996), University of Otago (2003), Saarland University (2008), Australian National University (2011), and the University of Technology Sydney (2011) and the University of Oxford (2013). In January 2017, he served as guest faculty at Mohanlal Sukhadia University in Udaipur, India, under the Global Initiative of Academic Networks (GIAN) program of the Indian Ministry of Human Resource Development. From 2017 to 2019, he was a visiting fellow at the University of Tulsa, conducting research in the V. S. Naipaul archive.

== Selected works ==
=== Books ===
- Hodge, Bob; Mishra, Vijay (1991). Dark Side of the Dream: Australian Literature and the Postcolonial Mind. North Sydney: Allen & Unwin. ISBN 9780044423461.
- Mishra, Vijay (1994). The Gothic Sublime. Albany: State University of New York Press. ISBN 9780791417478.
- Mishra, Vijay (1998). Devotional Poetics and the Indian Sublime. Albany: State University of New York Press. ISBN 9780791438718.
- Mishra, Vijay (2002). Bollywood Cinema: Temples of Desire. New York: Routledge. ISBN 9780415930154.
- Mishra, Vijay (2007). The Literature of the Indian Diaspora: Theorizing the Diasporic Imaginary. London: Routledge. ISBN 9780415759694.
- Mishra, Vijay (2012). What Was Multiculturalism? A Critical Retrospective. Carlton: Melbourne University Publishing. ISBN 9780522861273.
- Mishra, Vijay (2018). Annotating Salman Rushdie: Reading the Postcolonial. New Delhi: Routledge India. ISBN 978-0-8153-8208-9.
- Mishra, Vijay (2019). Salman Rushdie and the Genesis of Secrecy. London: Bloomsbury Academic. ISBN 978-1-3500-9439-0.
- Mishra, Vijay (2024). Subaltern Narratives in Fiji Hindi Literature. London: Anthem Press. ISBN 978-1-83999-070-0.
- Mishra, Vijay (2024). V. S. Naipaul and World Literature. New York: Cambridge University Press. ISBN 978-1-009-43386-0.

=== Selected articles ===
- Mishra, Vijay (1995). "Postcolonial Differend: Diasporic Narratives of Salman Rushdie". Ariel. 26 (3): 7–45.
- Mishra, Vijay (1996). "The Diasporic Imaginary: Theorizing the Indian Diaspora". Textual Practice. 10 (3): 421–447.
- Mishra, Vijay; Hodge, Bob (2005). "What Was Postcolonialism?". New Literary History. 36 (3): 375–402. doi:10.1353/nlh.2005.0045.
- Mishra, Vijay (2009). "Rushdie-Wushdie: Salman Rushdie's Hobson-Jobson". New Literary History. 40 (2): 385–410. doi:10.1353/nlh.0.0087.
- Mishra, Vijay (2015). "Plantation Diaspora, Testimonios, and the Enigma of the Black Waters". Interventions: Journal of Postcolonial Studies. 17 (4): 548–567.
- Mishra, Vijay (2017). "Manuscripts in an Archive: Two Unpublished Rushdie Novels and a TV Script". Journal of Commonwealth Literature. 52 (3): 422–438.

== Honors and awards ==
- Raja Rao Award for Literature (2008).
- Fellow of the Australian Academy of the Humanities (Elected 2009).
- Christensen Professorial Fellow, St Catherine's College, Oxford (2013).
- Erich Auerbach Professor of Global Literature, University of Tübingen (2015).
- Professorial Fellow, Indo-Pacific Centre, Murdoch University (2024–present).
