= David Dabydeen =

Guyanese-born broadcaster, writer and academic (born 1955)

David Dabydeen FRSL
- Born: David Horace Clarence Harilal Sookram; 9 December 1955 (age 70); Berbice, Guyana
- Education: Queen's College, Guyana; Selwyn College, Cambridge; University College London; Wolfson College, Oxford
- Occupations: Broadcaster, novelist, poet and academic
- Notable work: The Intended (1991)
- Relatives: Cyril Dabydeen (cousin)
- Awards: Guyana Prize for Literature; Commonwealth Poetry Prize

David Dabydeen FRSL (born 9 December 1955) is a Guyanese-born broadcaster, novelist, poet and academic. He was formerly Guyana's Ambassador to UNESCO (United Nations Education, Science and Culture Organisation) from 1997 to 2010, and was the youngest Member of the UNESCO Executive Board (1993–1997), elected by the General Council of all Member States of UNESCO. He was appointed Guyana's Ambassador Plenipotentiary and Extraordinaire to China, from 2010 to 2015. He is one of the longest serving diplomats in the history of Guyana, most of his work done in a voluntary unpaid capacity.

He is a cousin of Guyana-born Canadian writer Cyril Dabydeen.

== Early life and education ==
David Dabydeen was born in Berbice, Guyana, his birth registered at New Amsterdam Registrar of Births as David Horace Clarence Harilal Sookram. His Indo-Guyanese family trace their heritage back to East Indian indentured workers who had been brought to Guyana between 1838 and 1917. His parents divorced while he was young and he grew up with his mother, Veronica Dabydeen, and his maternal grandparents. At the age of 10, he won a scholarship to Queen's College in Georgetown. When he was 13 years old, he moved to London, England, to rejoin his father, a teacher then attorney David Harilal Sookram, who had migrated to Britain.

At the age of 18, Dabydeen took up a place at Selwyn College, University of Cambridge, United Kingdom, to read English, and he graduated with a Bachelor of Arts degree with honours and with the English Prize for Creative Writing (the first time the Sir Arthur Quiller-Couch Prize was awarded, in 1978). He then gained a PhD in 18th-century literature and art at University College London in 1982, and was awarded a Resident Fellowship at the Centre for British Art, Yale University, followed by a research fellowship at Wolfson College, Oxford.

== Career ==
Between 1982 and 1984, Dabydeen worked as a community education officer in Wolverhampton, the political territory of Enoch Powell, in the West Midlands of England. He subsequently went to the Centre for Caribbean Studies at the University of Warwick in Coventry, where he progressed over the years from lecturer to director. He was president of the Association for the Teaching of Caribbean, African, and Asian Literature between 1985 and 1987.

In 1993, he was elected by the member states of UNESCO to its Executive Board and from 1997 to 2010, Ambassador at UNESCO.

In 2010, Dabydeen was appointed as Guyana's Ambassador to China, holding the post until the change of government in Guyana at the 11 May 2015 elections. One of his major achievements, in the field of education, was to persuade the Government of China to establish and fund a Confucius Institute at the University of Guyana.

Dabydeen was a Professorial Fellow in the Office of the Vice Chancellor and President of the University of Warwick (2016–2019), having served at Warwick from 1984 to 2010 as Director of the Centre for Caribbean Studies and Professor of Postcolonial Literature, teaching undergraduate and graduate courses on Black British History and Culture; The Literature of Slavery; Caribbean Literature; Immigrant writers in Britain. He was instrumental in raising funds to rename the Centre, the Yesu Persaud Centre for Caribbean Studies, and to ensure its permanence at Warwick.

In 2020, he established in London the Ameena Gafoor Institute for the Study of Indentureship and its Legacies, and currently serves as its director. Its honorary patrons include Professor Uma Mesthrie (Mahatma Gandhi's great-granddaughter), Dr Patricia Rodney, Lord Parekh and Professor David Olusoga.

== Writing ==
Dabydeen is the author of seven novels, three collections of poetry and works of non-fiction and criticism, as editor as well as author. His first book, Slave Song (1984), a collection of poetry, won the Commonwealth Poetry Prize and the Quiller-Couch Prize. A further collection, Turner: New and Selected Poems, was published in 1994, and reissued in 2002; the title poem, Turner, is an extended sequence or verse novel responding to a painting by J. M. W. Turner, "Slavers Throwing overboard the Dead and Dying – Typhoon coming on" (1840).

Dabydeen's first novel, The Intended (1991), the story of a young Asian student abandoned in London by his father, was shortlisted for the UK John Llewellyn Rhys Prize and won the Guyana Prize for Literature. Disappearance (1993) tells the story of a young Guyanese engineer working on the south coast of England who lodges with an elderly woman. The Counting House (1996) is set at the end of the 19th century and narrates the experiences of an Indian couple whose hopes of a new life in colonial Guyana end in tragedy. The story explores historical tensions between indentured Indian workers and Guyanese of African descent. The novel was shortlisted for the 1998 Dublin Literary Award.

His 1999 novel, A Harlot's Progress, is based on a series of pictures painted in 1732 by William Hogarth (who was the subject of Dabydeen's PhD) and develops the story of the black boy in the series of paintings. The novel was shortlisted for the James Tait Black Memorial Prize, Britain's oldest literary prize. Dabydeen's novel Our Lady of Demerara was published in 2004 and also won the Guyana Prize for Literature. he then published two other novels, Molly and the Muslim Stick (2009) and Johnson's Dictionary (2013).

In 2000, Dabydeen was made a Fellow of the Royal Society of Literature. He was the third West Indian writer (V. S. Naipaul was the first) and the only Guyanese writer to be awarded the title.

In 2001, Dabydeen wrote and presented The Forgotten Colony, a BBC Radio 4 programme exploring the history of Guyana. His one-hour documentary Painting the People was broadcast by BBC television in 2004.

The Oxford Companion to Black British History, co-edited by Dabydeen with John Gilmore and Cecily Jones, appeared in 2007.

In 2007, Dabydeen was awarded the Hind Rattan (Jewel of India) Award for his outstanding contribution to literature and the intellectual life of the Indian diaspora.

With Maria del Pilar Kaladeen, Dabydeen co-edited The Other Windrush: Legacies of Indenture in Britain's Caribbean Empire (2021) and We Mark Your Memory: Writings from the Descendants of Indenture (2017, which Tina K. Ramnarine also co-edited with them).

== Bibliography ==
- Slave Song (poetry), Dangaroo, 1984; Peepal Tree Press, 2005
- Caribbean Literature: A Teacher's Handbook, Heinemann Educational Books, 1985
- The Black Presence in English Literature (editor), Manchester University Press, 1985
- A Reader's Guide to West Indian and Black British Literature (with Nana Wilson-Tagoe), Hansib/University of Warwick Centre for Caribbean Studies, 1987
- Hogarth's Blacks: Images of Blacks in 18th-Century English Art (art history), Manchester University Press, 1987
- Hogarth, Walpole and Commercial Britain (art history), Hansib, 1987
- India in the Caribbean (editor with Brinsley Samaroo), Hansib, 1987
- Coolie Odyssey (poetry), Hansib, 1988
- Handbook for Teaching Caribbean Literature, Heinemann, 1988
- Rented Rooms (editor), Dangaroo Press, 1988
- Black Writers in Britain 1760–1890 (editor with Paul Edwards), Edinburgh University Press, 1991
- The Intended (novel), Secker & Warburg, 1991; Peepal Tree Press, 2005
- Disappearance (novel), Secker & Warburg, 1993; Peepal Tree Press, 2005
- Turner: New and Selected Poems (poetry), Jonathan Cape, 1994; Peepal Tree Press, 2002
- Across the Dark Waters: Ethnicity and Indian Identity in the Caribbean, Macmillan, 1996
- The Counting House (novel), 1996; Peepal Tree Press, 2005
- A Harlot's Progress (novel), Jonathan Cape, 1999
- No Island is an Island: Selected Speeches of Sir Shridath Ramphal (editor with John Gilmore, Warwick University Caribbean Studies), Macmillan, 2000
- Turner: New and Selected Poems (poetry), Jonathan Cape, 1994; Peepal Tree Press, 2002
- Our Lady of Demerara (novel), Dido Press, 2004
- The Oxford Companion to Black British History (co-editor, with John Gilmore and Cecily Jones), Oxford University Press, 2007
- Selected Poems of Egbert Martin (editor), Heaventree Press, 2007
- Broadcast 2: Picture Thinking and Other Stories (co-editor with Jane Commane), Heaventree Press, 2007
- Molly and the Muslim Stick (novel), Macmillan Caribbean Writers, 2008
- The First Crossing: Being the Diary of Theophilus Richmond, Ship's Surgeon Aboard The Hesperus, 1837–8 (co-editor), Heaventree Press, 2008
- Pak's Britannica. Articles by and Interviews with David Dabydeen (ed. Lynne Macedo), University of West Indies Press, 2011.
- Johnson's Dictionary (novel), Peepal Tree Press, 2013
- We Mark Your Memory. Writings from the descendants of Indenture (co-editor, with Maria del Pilar Kaladeen and Tina K. Ramnarine), School of Advanced Study Press, University of London, 2017
- The Other Windrush: Legacies of Indenture in Britain's Caribbean Empire (co-editor, with Maria del Pilar Kaladeen), Pluto Books, 2021

== Prizes and awards ==
- 1984: Commonwealth Poetry Prize – Slave Song
- 1978: Quiller-Couch Prize (Cambridge) – Slave Song
- 1991: Guyana Prize for Literature – The Intended
- 1998: Shortlisted for the International Dublin Literary Award for the best book of fiction published in the previous two years worldwide.
- 1999: James Tait Black Memorial Prize (for fiction), shortlist – A Harlot's Progress
- 2004: Raja Rao Award for Literature (India)
- 2007: Hind Rattan (Jewel of India) Award
- 2008: Anthony Sabga Award for Caribbean Excellence. The largest recognition prize in the region and commonly called the "Caribbean Nobel"
- Four other Guyana Literature Prizes for his novels A Harlot's Progress (1999); Our Lady of Demerara (2004); Molly and the Muslim Stick (2008) and Johnson's Dictionary (2013).
