= Himani Dalmia =

Indian writer and entrepreneur

Himani Dalmia is an Indian writer, baby and toddler sleep specialist, social worker and entrepreneur. She is the co-founder of Gentle Baby Sleep India, India's first and largest peer-to-peer support group on infant and toddler sleep. She is co-author of Sleeping Like A Baby: the Art & Science of Gentle Baby Sleep, published by Penguin Random House India in 2021. Her first book, a novel titled Life is Perfect, was published by Rupa & Co. in 1999. The book made bestseller lists in India. She is a Certified Baby and Toddler Sleep Specialist and a pioneer in spreading awareness about biologically normal infant sleep in India.

== Early life ==
Dalmia is the granddaughter of pioneering industrialist Ramkrishna Dalmia and a scion of this well-known family, based in Delhi. Her parents are VN Dalmia and Nilanjana Dalmia, and she is married to Akash Premsen. The family comprises several writers and academics.

== Career ==
Dalmia worked as an editor for some time before writing her first novel. Life is Perfect was launched in Delhi, with Dalmia giving a panel discussion about the book. The story is about how complex relationships are, touching on ideas about monogamy and polyamory. The story also focuses on modern life in Delhi, with a young woman as the protagonist.

Dalmia is also a children's book expert and her first children's book is under publication by Harper Collins India.

Dalmia headed one of her family businesses for many years, a premium foods company which popularized the usage of olive oil and canola oil for cooking in India.

Her interest in baby sleep, children's literature and early childhood development emerged after the birth of her own children, which set her down a path of research and awareness creation for this important but neglected subject.

Dalmia is also an Indian classical musician, disciple of Vidushi Malti Gilani in the style of the Patiala-Kasur Gharana.
