= Hari Prasad Tamta =

Indian social activist

Munshi Hari Prasad Tamta (1887–1960) was Indian social activist and former editor of the magazine Samata. He is widely known for his work in the upliftment of Dalit communities of Uttarakhand and was called as "Father of Shilpkar Revolution".

== Early life ==
Tamta was born in a Dalit family, who are currently known as the Shilpkars in a village in Kumaon district (now in Almora, Uttarakhand) in British India to Govind Prasad and Govinda Devi on 26 August 1887. He was born in a well to do household with family being influential business in the region, with a background of his maternal family in local politics. He was married to Parvati Devi, at the age of 14 and engaged in family business due to death of his father at an early age under the guidance of his uncle.

He was educated till the high school and faced casteism in the school, which was prevalent at that time. He was proficient in Arabic, English, Persian and Urdu due to which he was given the title of Munshi.

== Activism ==
From an early age, he used to face casteism and being born in an affluent family with political background, he started his activism among the untouchables of the Kumaon region. He started his activism in 1903 after a popular incidence, where he and members of his community, who belonged to lower castes were not allowed to participate in the Second Delhi Durbar. After the incidence, Tamta organized meetings with the members of the untouchable castes in the Kumaon region in order to unite them against caste discrimination which was prevalent at that time. He focused upon the unification of various artisan communities such as Auji, Badhai, Badi, Bajgi, Dholi, Doma, Lohar, Kolta and other artisan caste under an single umbrella term and formed Tamta Sabha.

In 1914, in one of the meeting with members of the Tamta Sabha, it was decided to call the community under the umbrella term of Shilpkar due to the artisan nature and word being respectful to the members of the community. The name of the Tamta Sabha was changed to Shilpkar Mahasabha and in order to uplift the social status of his community members, he focused on opening schools in the villages of the Dalit communities and health institutions for their better access to health and education. Other than social upliftment, his primary focus was financial upliftment of Shilpkars and in 1920, he started his own company Hill Motor Transport Company for financing of his movement.

In 1925, a massive conference was held in the Almora presided by Tamta in which the term "Shilpkar" was coined as the term for the community and community members to prioritise education of their children, with adoption of terms such as Ram, Lal, Chandra, Arya, Das, etc. as their surname. He organized the community members to identify them under singular caste of Shilpkar and next year in 1926, he made demand to the British Government to recognize Shilpkar as a caste name for the community. In 1931 census, the term of Shilpkar was officially used for the community and under the Government of India Act, 1935, they were granted the status of Scheduled Caste. He also supported B. R. Ambedkar in Poona Pact in 1932 in the Round Table Conference. Due to his activism in 1938, the Shilpkars were allowed to serve in the British Indian Army and get employment in various government jobs.

He was highly influenced by Lala Lajpat Rai from early life and started weekly magazine, named Samata with his niece, who was also first woman editor in the United Provinces.

== Death ==
In the last stage of his life, he focused was shifted on publishing articles on newspaper and magazines for addressing issues of untouchables and on 23 February 1960, he died in Prayagraj, Uttar Pradesh due to prolonged illness.
