= Yasmine Gooneratne =

Sri Lankan writer (1935–2024)

- යස්මින් ගුණරත්න
- Born: 1935; Colombo, British Ceylon
- Died: 15 February 2024 (aged 88)
- Occupations: University professor, literary critic, editor, poet, essayist, short story writer, novelist and educator

Yasmine Gooneratne (Sinhala: යස්මින් ගුණරත්න; 1935 – 15 February 2024) was a Sri Lankan poet, short story writer, university professor and essayist. She was recognised in Sri Lanka, Australia, throughout Europe, and the United States, due to her substantial creative and critical publications in the field of English and post-colonial literature. After 35 years in Australia, she returned to live in Sri Lanka.

Gooneratne was educated at the University of Ceylon and Cambridge University. She held a personal chair in English as a Professor at Macquarie University in Sydney, and held an Emeritus position after her retirement.

Gooneratne was awarded Australia’s highest national honour, the Order of Australia, in 1990, for her services to Education and Literature.

Gooneratne was also awarded the Raja Rao Award in 2001, for ‘Outstanding Contribution To The Literature and Culture Of The South Asian Diaspora.’ This award was presented by the Samvad India Foundation and Jawaharlal Nehru University, New Delhi.

Gooneratne was also honoured with Sri Lanka’s Sahithyarathna Award for a lifetime achievement in Literature at The State Literary Festival in 2008. This award is described as ‘The Highest Honour bestowed by the State of Sri Lanka’, and was conferred on Gooneratne ‘For Her Immense Contribution To The Field Of English Literature.’

Gooneratne was invited to be a patron of Sri Lanka’s literary festival, The Galle Literary Festival – also known as ‘The Fairway Galle කැල්ලපත Literary Festival’ – at its inception, in 2005.

== Biography ==
Born into the Bandaranaike family, the niece of S. W. R. D. Bandaranaike, Yasmine married a Sri Lankan physician, Dr. Brendon Gooneratne, in 1962. They had two children.

Gooneratne was appointed Officer of the Order of Australia in 1990 by the Australian government for her distinguished services to literature and education, the only Sri Lankan to have received this honour. She received a Ph.D for English literature from Cambridge University in 1962.

Her international scholarship and pioneering work in the study and appreciation of postcolonial literature was described as being recognized by "Macquarie University's first higher doctoral degree (D.Litt.), the Order of Australia, and the Samvad India Foundation's Raja Rao Award for Literature which acknowledges authors who deal with the South Asian Diaspora in their literary work." The Sunday Times of Sri Lanka wrote of Gooneratne:

When Saraswati did come into Yasmine’s life... she took the form of the goddess Tara. When The Samvad India Foundation singled out Yasmine for the Raja Rao award in 2002, they made her a gift of the beautiful little figurine. This international prize celebrates writers and scholars who have made an outstanding contribution to the literature of the South Asian diaspora, and the honour delighted Yasmine even as it took her by surprise. “I never expected that the Indian writing establishment would regard me in that light,” she says.

Gooneratne died on 15 February 2024, at the age of 88.

== Literature career ==
Gooneratne was one of the leading contributors to the field of English literature in Sri Lanka, and Australia, as a creative writer, an academic and literary critic, and as a lecturer, particularly in the areas of eighteenth-century literature, Jane Austen’s novels, and post-colonial literature.

Gooneratne was the founder and director of the Centre for Post-Colonial Literature and Language Studies at Macquarie University. She was the patron of the Jane Austen Society of Australia, a position to which she was appointed in 1990.

Gooneratne founded the literary journal New Ceylon Writing in 1970, to publish the creative writing of Sri Lankan writers in English. 5 issues of this publication were printed between 1970 and 1983/4. These 5 printed issues were digitally scanned, called ‘The Quintet’, and made available as an open access resource on the New Ceylon Writing website, newceylonwriting.com, after the publication was brought online in 2016. Issues #6 and #7 are available on the website as digital documents.

Her poetry also won acclaim, with several collections of poetry published, including ‘The Lizard’s Cry’, ‘Word, Bird, Motif’, ‘6,000 Foot Death Dive’ and ‘Celebrations And Departures’. Her poem "Big Match 1983" describes the situation caused by the Black July riots in Sri Lanka. The poem is based on events that took place in 1983.

Gooneratne wrote two academic books for Cambridge University Press, on Jane Austen and Alexander Pope. She has also published 16 books with themes of post-colonial cultural tensions, both in creative fiction and literary criticism. Her first novel A Change of Skies (1991) won the 1991 Marjorie Barnard Literature Award for Fiction and was shortlisted for the 1991 Commonwealth Fiction Prize. Her second novel, The Pleasures Of Conquest, published in 1995/6, was listed for The Commonwealth Fiction Award. In 2008, she was nominated for the International Dublin Literary Award for her third novel The Sweet and Simple Kind, and is to date the only Sri Lankan author to have been shortlisted for the Dublin IMPAC Award.

In 1999, Gooneratne co-wrote, with her husband, This Inscrutable Englishman, a biography of Sir John D’Oyly, a civil servant in British Colonial Sri Lanka.

Gooneratne also edited Stories from Sri Lanka and Poems from India, Sri Lanka, Malaysia and Singapore (1979), titles in the Writing in Asia Series published from 1966 to 1996. Her fourth novel, Rannygazoo, was released online in 2015.

== Awards and recognition ==
In 1990, Gooneratne was awarded the Order of Australia for her services to Literature and Education.

In 2001, Gooneratne was given the Raja Rao Award in India, for her contributions to the Literature and Culture of the South Asian Diaspora.

In 2008, Gooneratne was given the Sahithyarathna Award in Sri Lanka.

In 2011, the Premchand Fellowship of Sahitya Akademi of India was conferred upon Gooneratne.
