= Cyril Dabydeen =

Guyana-born Canadian writer

- Born: 1945 (age 80–81)
- Education: Lakehead University; Queen's University
- Notable work: Sandbach Parker Gold Medal for poetry (1964); A. J. Seymour Lyric Poetry Prize (1967)
- Relatives: David Dabydeen (cousin

Cyril Dabydeen (born 1945) is a Guyana-born Canadian writer of Indian descent. He grew up in Rose Hall sugar plantation with the sense of Indian indenture rooted in his family background. He is a cousin of the UK writer David Dabydeen.

== History ==
Cyril Dabydeen was born in the Canje, Guyana, in 1945 and began writing in the early 1960s. He won the Sandbach Parker Gold Medal for poetry in 1964 and the first A. J. Seymour Lyric Poetry Prize in 1967. His first chapbook collection, Poems in Recession, was published in 1972. In his early years he taught school, from 1961 to 1970, beginning as a pupil teacher (a British educational tradition, e.g., D. H. Lawrence also worked as a pupil teacher); Dabydeen taught mainly at St. Patrick's Anglican School, Rose Hall, and received formal teacher-training.

In 1970, he attended university in Canada and obtained a BA degree in English (First-Class Hons.) at Lakehead University, an MA degree in English (thesis on American poet Sylvia Plath) at Queen's University, and a Master of Public Administration degree also at Queen's University. He was twice admitted to the PhD Program at York University.

He was a literary juror in 2000 and 2006 for Canada's Governor's General Award for Literature (poetry); the Neustadt International Prize for Literature (University of Oklahoma), in 2000; the James Lignon Price Competition (the American Poets University & College Poetry Prize Program) via St. Lawrence University, New York, in 2003; the Small Axe Magazine Poetry Prize (NYC) in 2011; the Bocas (Trinidad/Caribbean) Literary Prize for poetry in 2013; Canada Council for the Arts awards;and the Canadian Broadcasting Corporation (Canada Writes, 2014), among others.

== Awards and recognition ==
Dabydeen was appointed the official Poet Laureate of the City of Ottawa from 1984 to 1987, perhaps the first minority person to hold such a position in a Canadian city.

A finalist at least four times for Canada's Archibald Lampman Award for poetry, as well as for the Guyana Prize, he eventually won the top Guyana Prize for Fiction in 2006 for his novel Drums of My Flesh, which was nominated for the prestigious International Dublin Literary Award and was a shortlisted finalist for the Ottawa Book Award. He was again a prize-winner of the Guyana Literature Prize for Fiction, 2022 and 2024, and shortlisted for poetry more than once. His writing has also been nominated for the Pushcart Prize (US), the Journey Prize, and he has twice won the Okanagan Fiction Prize.

He received the City of Ottawa's first award for Writing and Publishing, and achieved a Certificate of Merit, Government of Canada (1988), for his contribution to the arts. He has published about 100 book reviews in outlets such as Books in Canada, Canadian Literature, The Dalhousie Review, The Ottawa Journal, The Ottawa Citizen, The Chelsea Journal, and has been a regular book critic for World Literature Today (University of Oklahoma). He was invited to join the International Writing Program at the University of Iowa in the mid-1980s. He has received Canada Council for the Arts, Ontario Arts Council, Department of Canadian Heritage, and City of Ottawa Arts awards over the years. He achieved a Word Masala Award (Skylark Publications, UK), 2018; the Canute A. Brodhurst Fiction Prize (The Caribbean Writer/Univ. of the Virgin Islands), 2020; and acclaimed with Poet of Honour via Ars Notoria (UK) and Word Masala Foundation/UK (2021). For the Strands International flash-fiction awards he was a shortlisted finalist (May 2020); achieved Honourable Mention (December 2020); Second Prize-winner (September 2021); and again acclaimed with Honourable Mention (January 2022). In 2023, he was a prize-winner in the International Conference on the Short Story in English competition, held in Singapore (adjudicated by Clark Blaise). He is described as "a noted Canadian poet" and his work--"a great poem"—was read in Parliament (House of Commons, Ottawa, 24 April 2001, recorded in Hansard).

== Work ==
He has navigated a double career as a writer and educator combined with social justice, diversity and race relations issues in Canada (with the federal and municipal governments, travelling to more than 30 towns and cities advancing these issues); for a decade he managed a National Action Committee on Race Relations chaired at different times by the Mayors of Toronto, Regina, etc. for the Federation of Canadian Municipalities in providing a national clearing house of information to tackle systemic issues, as well as coordinating an annual race relations award aimed at building social cohesion. Previously he was an Administrator with the City of Ottawa, and with the Federal Government. He taught for six years as an Adjunct English professor at Algonquin College, Ottawa, and similarly for 15 years at the University of Ottawa (Department of English, Continuing Education, and Professional Services) where he achieved the Dean of Arts Part-time Professor of the Year Award, and was a finalist for the National Capital Educators' Award. Under the university's Professional Services Program, he conducted diversity training seminars as a certified trainer to Federal Government personnel (e.g, Privy Council, National Defence, Stats. Canada) and private organizations. His published works have appeared in numerous literary magazines and anthologies, including the Oxford, Penguin and Heinemann Books of Caribbean Verse, Poetry (Chicago),Critical Quarterly (UK), The Warwick Review (UK), Prairie Schooner (USA), Kunapipi (Australia), Wasafiri(UK), Planet: The Welsh Internationalist (UK), Exempla (W. Germany), Chandrabhaga (India), Confluence(UK), World Literature Today (UOklahoma), Drunken Boat, Fiction International (University_of San Diego, US),The Literary Review (US), The Fiddlehead, The Canadian Forum, PRISM international, The Dalhousie Review, The Antigonish Review, Canadian Literature, Canadian Fiction Magazine, The University of Windsor Review, The Queen's Quarterly, ARIEL, Quarry, Grain, Khavya Bharati (India), Wascana Review, Short Story (University of Texas), Words and Worlds (Austria), Two-Thirds North (Stockholm University), Journal of South Asian Literature (USA), Broken Pencil, The Literary Review of Canada, Descant, Books in Canada, Kyk-over-al, The Globe and Mail/Christmas short story], etc.

He has done more than 300 public readings—including in about 40 colleges and universities—from his books across Canada, the US, UK and Europe (England, Denmark, Portugal, Netherlands, Austria), the Caribbean (Trinidad, Guadeloupe, Jamaica, St. Lucia, Cuba), and India (Delhi, Jaipur, Shimla);and about a dozen times at the National Library/Archives, Ottawa, and with UNESCO.

He has published and edited 20 books consisting of poetry, short stories, novels, and special anthologies on Asian and Black writing. He is a former member of the League of Canadian Poets (he served on the Membership and International Affairs subcommittees) and PEN International. His op-ed essays have appeared in the Globe and Mail, The Toronto Star, The Ottawa Citizen, and the Washington Times Review, etc.

Dabydeen's titles in the field of poetry include: God's Spider (Peepal Tree Press, UK); Unanimous Night (Black Moss Press); Uncharted Heart, Poems (Borealis Press, Ottawa); Imaginary Origins: New and Selected Poems (Peepal Tree Press, UK); Hemipshere of Love (TSAR Publications, Toronto); Discussing Columbus (Peepal Tree Press); Stoning the Wind (TSAR); Born in Amazonia (Mosaic Press, Ontario); and Coastland: New and Selected Poems (Mosaic Press).

His novels include: Drums of My Flesh (Mawenzi House/TSAR), Dark Swirl (Peepal Tree), The Wizard Swami (Peepal Tree) and Sometimes Hard/young adult (Longman, UK).

Dabydeen's key short story collections are: Forgotten Exiles (Mosaic Press, Ontario), My Undiscovered Country (Mosaic Press, Ontario), My Multi-Ethnic Friends and Other Stories (Guernica Editions, Toronto), Short Stories of Cyril Dabydeen (Guyana Classics Series/Caribbean Press), Play a Song Somebody: New and Selected Stories (Mosaic Press); Black Jesus and Other Stories (TSAR); Berbice Crossing (Peepal Tree); My Brahmin Days (Mawenzi House/TSAR); North of the Equator (Beach Holme/Dundurn), and Jogging in Havana (Mosaic Press).

He edited four anthologies: Another Way to Dance: Asian-Canadian Poetry (Williams-Wallace); Another Way to Dance: Contemporary Asian Poetry in Canada and the US (TSAR Publications); A Shapely Fire: Changing the Literary Landscape (Mosaic Press); and Beyond Sangre Grande: Caribbean Writing Today (Mawenzi House/TSAR Publications).Co-edited with Anita Nahal, et al, Soul Spaces: Poems of Cities, Towns, and Villages (Authors Press, Delhi, 2023).

== Reception ==
Academic papers have been given on Dabydeen's work in Canada, United States, United Kingdom, France, Spain, Australia, Brazil, India, and the Caribbean. A book-length study on his work was published by Prof. Jameela Begum, Dept. of English, University of Kerala, India. Critics have described him as: "a gifted Canadian poet" (Toronto Star); the "Pablo Neruda of Ottawa" (Patricia Morley, The Ottawa Citizen); "one of the most confident & accomplished voices of the Caribbean diaspora" (Kamau Brathwaite, New York University); "a fine craftsman and a wonderful weaver of images" (Kwame Dawes, World Literature Today, University of Oklahoma); "an amazing writer" (Douglas Glover); "like all your work--astute in politics and artful in poetics" (George Elliot Clarke, Parliamentary Poet Laureate); and that his reading style has "Stravinsky's rhythms" (The Ottawa Citizen). He has read on stage with some of Canada's important writers, including Sam Selvon, Rohinton Mistry, Dionne Brand, Austin Clarke, George Elliot Clarke, Lawrence Hill, Joy Kogawa, and M. G. Vassanji. He has been a guest of the Toronto Writers' Festival (Harbourfront Series), The Ottawa International Writers' Festival, the Winnipeg International Writers' Festival, the Miami Book Fair International, the Nordic Association of Canadian Studies, the International Conference on the Short Story in English—venues in the US, Europe and Canada; and has given keynote speeches at Pennsylvania State University (Graduate Students' Association Conference), Lakehead University (McLeod Lecture as a guest of the Faculties of Arts and Social Sciences), and the Canadian Ethnic Studies Conference (Vancouver). He is referred to as one of "Canada's most popular post-colonial writers" (The Danforth Review). He received the Guyana Folk Festival Award/New York, in 2006, with a Certificate of Special Congressional Recognition, USA "for outstanding service to the community," and an Exemplary Achievement Award, 2016—both recommended by the Guyana Cultural Association of New York. He also received a Lifetime Achievement Award for Excellence from the Guyana Awards Council (Toronto), 2010. He is included in the Canadian Who's Who, the Europa International Who's Who, and the World Who's Who (Routledge, UK); as well as in The Oxford Companion to Twentieth-Century Literature in English, and in The Oxford Companion to Twentieth-Century Poetry in English. .
