= K. S. Maniam =

Malaysian academic and novelist (1942–2020)

- Born: Subramaniam Krishnan; 1942 Bedong, Kedah, Unfederated Malay States or Japanese Malaya (now Malaysia)
- Died: 19 February 2020 (aged 77–78) Kuala Lumpur, Malaysia
- Occupation: Academician, Novelist
- Citizenship: Malaysian
- Period: c.1955 – 2018
- Notable works: The Return (1981), In A Far Country (1983)
- Notable awards: Raja Rao Award for Literature

Subramaniam Krishnan (1942 – 19 February 2020), popularly known as K. S. Maniam, was a Malaysian academic and novelist.

== Biography ==
KS Maniam was born in Bedong, Kedah in 1942, of Tamil origin and from a poor family; his father was the launderer of a hospital and to feed his family, also had to work in a rubber plantation near Bedong. After a year in a Tamil school, he attended Ibrahim School, an English school.

Maniam had been writing from his early teens. His stories have appeared in numerous journals around the world. His first novel, The Return, was published in 1981 and the second, In a Far Country, in 1993. He won the first prize for The Loved Flaw: Stories from Malaysia in The New Straits Times–McDonald short-story contest (1987) and for Haunting the Tiger: Contemporary Stories from Malaysia in The New Straits Times–Shell contest (1990). He was the inaugural recipient of the Raja Rao Award for Literature (New Delhi, September 2000), for his outstanding contribution to the literature of the South Asian diaspora. He was a lecturer (1980–85) and associate professor (1986–97) in the English Department, University of Malaya, in Kuala Lumpur. He lived with his wife, son and daughter in Subang Jaya, Malaysia, and devoted his time fully to writing.

He died on 19 February 2020, of cancer of the bile duct at the Universiti Malaya Medical Centre in Kuala Lumpur.

== Bibliography ==
Novels

- The Return (London: Skoob, 1981, 1993)
- In A Far Country (1993)
- Between Lives (2003)

Plays

- The Cord (1983)
- The Sandpit: Womensis (1990)

Short stories

- The Eagles (1976)
- Removal in Pasir Panjang (1981)
- The Pelanduk (1981)
- The Third Child (1981)
- The Dream of Vasantha (1981)
- Project: Graft Man (1983)
- We Make It To The Capital (1984)
- The Aborting (1986)
- Encounters (1989)
- Parablames (1989)
- Plot (1989)
- Haunting the Tiger (1990)
- Sensuous Horizons: The Stories & The Plays (1994)
- In Flight (written 1993, published 1995)
- Arriving ...and other stories (1995)
- Faced Out (2004)
- Guardian Knot
- A Stranger to Love (2018)
