= Manu Bheel =

Bonded labor activist

- منو بھیل
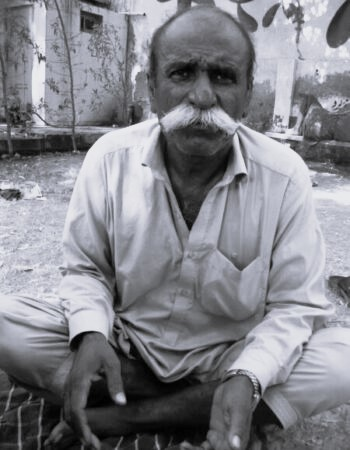
- Born: 1954 (age 71–72); Tharparkar Sindh, Pakistan
- Occupation: Humanitarian
- Known for: Activism
- Spouse: Motan (Kidnapped)

Manu Bheel (Urdu : منو بھیل ) (born 1954) was bonded laborer and human rights activist. Nine of his family members were abducted in 1998. He advocates for the rights of marginalized communities and bonded laborers in Pakistan.

== Personal life ==
Manu Bheel was born to a poor Hindu Scheduled Caste agricultural laborer's family in the Tharparkar region of Sindh, Pakistan. He, along with his family, was bonded to a landlord in Sanghar District before being freed through the intervention of Human Rights Commission of Pakistan and community leaders

== Struggle ==
After being freed from bonded labor in Sindh in 1996 through the intervention of the Human Rights Commission of Pakistan (HRCP), Manu Bheel became involved in activism, focusing on the rights of marginalized communities. His advocacy efforts took a more personal turn in 1998, when his family was kidnapped, an incident he attributed to his former landlord.

In 2003, Manu began a hunger strike outside the Hyderabad Press Club, aiming to draw attention to the disappearance of his family and the wider issue of bonded labour. His protests gained national and international attention, including appeals from organizations such as Anti-Slavery International.

== List of kidnapped family members ==
The names and ages of the kidnapped family members of Manu Bheel, as claimed by him on February 4, 1998:

Sr. No	Name	Age	Relation
1	Khero	70	Father
2	Akho	60-65	Mother
3	Motan	40	Wife
4	Jalal	25	Brother
5	Momal	13	Daughter
6	Chaman	10	Son
7	Kanjee	8	Son
8	Dahnee	1½	Daughter
9	Kirto	N/A	Family guest
