= Himani Savarkar =

Indian politician

- Born: Asilatha Godse; 31 March 1947; Pune
- Died: 11 October 2015 (aged 68); Pune
- Years active: 2000-2015
- Organization: Abhinav Bharat
- Political party: Hindu Mahasabha
- Movement: Hindutva
- Father: Gopal Godse
- Relatives: Nathuram Godse (uncle)

Himani Ashok Savarkar (31 March 1947 – 11 October 2015) was an Indian politician and Hindutva Activist. She was daughter of Gopal Godse, niece of Nathuram Godse. She was a leader of Abhinav Bharat and Akhil Bhartiya Hindu Mahasabha. She was married to Ashok Narayan Savarkar nephew of Vinayak Damodar Savarkar.

== Early life ==
Himani Ashok Savarkar was born as Asilatha Godse to Gopal Godse in Pune, Maharashtra.

== Career ==
Savarkar was an architect by profession but joined active Politics in 2000, she fought and gone unsuccessful in the 2004 Indian general elections from Kasba Peth Lok Sabha constituency and 2009 Maharashtra Legislative Assembly election from Kothrud Assembly constituency representing Akhil Bhartiya Hindu Mahsabha.

== Books ==
- Savarkar, Himani (1 January 2001). Nitya Savarkar Vichardarshana (in Marathi). Manorama Prakashan. ISBN 9788172943356.
- Savarkar, Himani. Selected Works of Veer Savarkar. Vol. 4. Abhishek Publications. ISBN 9788182471443.
