= Ginni Mahi =

Indian singer (born 1998)

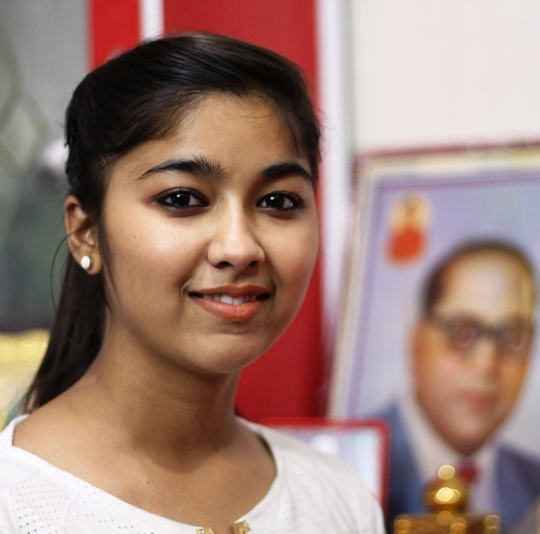
- Born: Jalandhar, Punjab, India
- Other name: Gurkanwal Bharti
- Occupations: Singer, Composer, Lyricist
- Website: Facebook Profile

Gurkanwal Bharti, known professionally as Ginni Mahi is an Indian Punjabi folk, rap and hip-hop singer hailing from Jalandhar, Punjab, India. She became famous with her songs Fan Baba Sahib Di and Danger Chamar that went viral on social media. She attended the Global Media Forum (GMF 2018) in Germany, where she was dubbed as a Young Voice in Equality and Freedom, for speaking up against flogging.

Mahi idolises Lata Mangeshkar and Shreya Ghoshal in her singing while trying to convey the messages of B. R. Ambedkar in her lyrics. She has performed outside of India, in Canada, Greece, Italy, Germany, and the United Kingdom. She held her first Interview in 2016 on NDTV with Barkha Dutt in Delhi. Subsequently, in 2018 she attended 'Sahitya' Live conversation show organized by AajTak TV channel at New Delhi. She took the stage to speak up for equality of women in the Indian society.

== Early life ==
Gurkanwal Bharti was born to Rakesh Chander Mahi and Parmjit Kaur Mahi in Abadpura, in Jalandhar, Punjab. She began singing songs to her father at the age of seven. Her parents changed the last name of all their children to Bharti to remind them that they are Indian, above all. Her father also quit his job in an air-ticketing office to manage Mahi's career. She is studying a degree in music at Hans Raj Mahila Maha Vidyalaya College.

Mahi was just eight when the family took note of her musical talent and enrolled her to Kala Jagat Narayan School in Jalandhar. She subsequently began singing religious songs with a backing of Amarjeet Singh of Amar Audio, who produced both her devotional albums. She did her first live show when she was just 12 years old. She wishes to pursue a PhD in music to attach the "Doctor" title to her name. She eventually wants to become a Bollywood playback singer in Mumbai.

== Career ==
=== Social justice and her music ===
Mahi's first two albums, Guraan di Diwani and Gurupurab hai Kanshi Wale Da were devotional hymns. However, it was an ode to Babasaheb Ambedkar that got her fame. One of her first songs was 'Fan Baba Saheb di', which was a tribute to Ambedkar, the architect of Indian constitution. This song went viral on YouTube. Mahi calls Babasaheb Ambedkar her inspiration and often writes songs about social oppression that people face owing to caste. To make sure her songs don't offend anyone, the lyrics of her songs are analyzed by a team consisting of her parents, the music director Amarjit Singh, and the video director Raman Rajat.

When Mahi was in school, she was asked of her caste. When she replied that she belongs to the SC category (Scheduled Castes), her classmate persisted on the details. Mahi finally relented and said that she belongs to a community that is formerly known as Chamar but not before insisting that she doesn't believe in caste. In response, her classmate said, "Arre Chamar bade danger hote hain, panga nahin lena chahiye (Chamars are supposed to be dangerous, You should be careful)." Upon coming home, Mahi shared this incident with her family members and this story spread among their friends. One day her father got a call from a lyricist who had written an empowering song around 'Danger Chamar'. That's how the song was born. The song looked at eradicating the unpleasantness associated with her caste name, Chamar and turn it into something more empowering and a matter of pride.

She has sung songs on female foeticide and the problem of drugs in Punjab.

=== Performances ===
In a short span of time, Mahi has performed in many concerts. In India, she has performed for popular events including Udaipur World Music Festival, 'We the Women' a congregation of women speakers in Mumbai and also globally including Deutsche Welle Global Media Forum among others. In 2020, post her Europe music tour, she was stuck in Italy owing to the lockdown imposed due to the Coronavirus pandemic. She returned to India by boarding the first of Vande Bharat, India's repatriation flights.

== Discography ==
Mahi chose to sing devotional songs first to gain some recognition among the Punjabi population, before shifting to the political and anti-casteism theme that sings in now.

=== Albums ===
- Guraan di Diwani (2015)
- Gurupurab hai Kanshi Wale Da (2016)
- Dhol Wajde Sangtan De Vehre (2017)
- Folk Fusion (2019)

=== Singles ===
- Danger Chamar (2016)
- Haq (2016)
- Fan Baba Sahib Di (2016)
- 1932 (Haq 2) (2017)
- Suit Patiala (2017)
- Salaaman (2018)
- Raaj Baba Sahib Da (2018)
- Mard Daler (2019)

=== Commercial Songs ===
- Dhee Haan (Ki Hoya J IK Dhee Haan)
- Suit Patiala
- Holidays (Cover Song)
- Down to Earth
- Tere Piche (ft. Har Saab, 2022)
- Bolo Jai Bhim (2020)
