= Harsha V. Dehejia =

Indo-Canadian allergologist, author and radio host

Harsha Venilal Dehejia (born 1938) is an Indo-Canadian allergologist, author, and radio host, and Professor of Indian Studies at Carleton University. He was the winner of the 2003 Raja Rao Award for Literature for outstanding contributions to the literature and culture of the South Asian Diaspora, and the host of the radio show An Indian Morning for over 40 years.

== Earlier career ==
Born and raised in Malabar Hill, South Mumbai, Dehejia received his medical doctorate from Bombay University, "with six gold medals", and then studied allergy and respiratory diseases at Cambridge University. He moved to Canada, where he began practicing medicine in Ottawa around 1968.

In 1975, Dehejia helped the radio station CKCU-FM obtain its first broadcast license, and began hosting the radio show An Indian Morning that November. In 1976, he wrote "a pocket-book sized manual entitled I Can Cope With Allergy", and in 1980, he published The Allergy Book. In a 1984 news piece, he noted his displeasure with "all the myths surrounding allergies," noting that people often misuse the term to refer to normal responses to toxins, when an allergy is defined as an abnormal response to substances harmless to most. Dehejia continued to engage in numerous civic and cultural activities as well, with The Ottawa Citizen noting in 2003:

Although he is a leading allergist in Ottawa, Dr. Dehejia has found time to write books about the poetry and painting and gods of India, host a radio program, An Indian Morning, and teach a course at Carleton University on Hinduism and Classical Indian intellectual traditions.

By that year, Dehehjia was regularly travelling to India, working towards earning his PhD in religion from the University of Bombay, and participating in seminars. Dehejia was also presented with the 2003 Raja Rao Award for Literature for his outstanding contributions to the literature and culture of the South Asian Diaspora. In 2008, Dehejia was one of the five recipients of a recognition for community leadership by the Indo-Canada Ottawa Business Chamber.

== Later writing and activities ==
In 2014, Dehejia published his only work of fiction, the novel Parul: A Love Story, a story of a man who slowly surrenders his conviction in the principle of Maya, that the world is an illusion. The protagonist experiences romance with a beautiful and sensual woman who induces him to accept the reality of the beauty of things in the world. In 2015, he celebrated the 40th year of his radio show, An Indian Morning, the only show to have been broadcast continuously on CKCU-FM for that length of time.

In 2017, Dehejia published Walk With Me On Mumbai Footpaths, recounting discoveries encountered while walking in Mumbai. The following year, he published Radhayan, which "explores the many stories that feature Radha," a Hindu goddess. Dehejia "spent over two years researching and writing" for this book. In 2019, Dehejia further explored this mythos with his chapter, “The heart-throb of Chaitanya” in the book Finding Radha: The Quest for Love, and in an edited collection, Radha: From Gopi to Goddess.

== Personal life ==
Dehejia's son, Vivek Harsha Dehejia, is also a professor at Carleton University, teaching in the areas of philosophy and economics.
