= Rupa Publications =

Book publisher in India

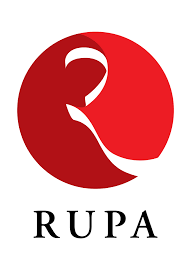
- Parent company: Rupa Publications India Pvt. Ltd.
- Status: Active
- Founded: 1936
- Founder: D. Mehra
- Country of origin: India
- Headquarters location: Delhi
- Distribution: Kolkata, Allahabad, Chennai, Mumbai, Hyderabad, Jaipur, Kathmandu and overseas
- Key people: D. Mehra, R. K. Mehra and Kapish Mehra
- Imprints: Red Turtle
- Official website: www.rupapublications.co.in

Rupa Publications is an Indian publishing company based in New Delhi, with sales centres in Kolkata, Allahabad, Bengaluru, Chennai, Mumbai, Jaipur, Hyderabad and Kathmandu.

== Genesis ==
Rupa Publications was founded in 1936 by D. Mehra and R. K. Mehra at College Street in Calcutta. Also a book distributor and importer, The logo of the company was designed by the film maker Satyajit Ray and he asked for some books as fees for his job.

== Business profile ==
Rupa Publications has published all of Chetan Bhagat's books, My Country My Life (the autobiography of L. K. Advani), some of Ramendra Kumar's and Ruskin Bond's books, and has also published Kaun Banega Crorepati – The Official Book, Life is Perfect by Himani Dalmia, and Pranab Mukherjee's autobiographical title the Presidential Years. According to the publishing house, their annual production stands at approximately 150-200 titles currently.

In 2012, Kapish Mehra, current managing director of the company launched Aleph Book Company, along with David Davidar, former CEO of Penguin-International; shortly after it was launched, the company hired Ravi Singh, former Publisher of Penguin-India, to join the publishing team.
