= Sumeet Samos =

- Also known as: Turuk, Da-Lit boy
- Born: 19 October 1993 (age 32); Tentulipadar, Koraput district, Odisha
- Genres: Hip hop music
- Occupations: rapper, student activist, columnist, photographer
- Years active: 2016––present
- Labels: Qweed Media
- Website: www.youtube.com/channel/UCBg0FZaCtFj1BLfD5rR8aPA/

Sumeet Samos is an Indian anti-caste scholar and rapper from Odisha, India. He writes and sings in English, Hindi and Odia. His first hip-hop single "Ladai Seekh Le" (Learn to Resist) was released in 2018.

Samos addresses SC/ST students, Savarna oppression, Ambedkar-Phule ideology, manual scavenging, caste discrimination and atrocities against Dalits in his songs.

== Life ==
Sumeet Samos was born into a Dalit family of Tentulipadar village of Koraput district, Odisha. He completed his schooling from Bhubaneswar. He has a Masters in Latin American Literature (Spanish) from Jawaharlal Nehru University, where he joined the Birsa Ambedkar Phule Students' Association. In 2021, he enrolled for the MSc Programme in Modern Asian Studies from the University of Oxford., and based on his experiences of caste in academics there he wrote an informative piece for Round Table India He also published his memoirs, Affairs of Caste: A Young Diary in July 2022. The book is a Panther's Paw publication.

Samos started rapping in 2016 and his inspiration is the rapper Tupac Shakur.

== Tracks ==
Year	Track	Artist	Director
2018	Ladai Seekh Le	Sumeet Samos	Sanjay Singh Karki
2018	Desia Pila	Sumeet Samos	Debojit Bora and Hans Abhishek
2018	All You know is Five words	Sumeet Samos	Sumeet Samos
