= Savindra Sawarkar =

Indian Artist

- Born: 1961 (age 64–65); Nagpur, India
- Education: Bachelor of Fine Arts (Drawing and Painting), Nagpur University
- Alma mater: The Maharaja Sayajirao University of Baroda (MFA in Printmaking)
- Known for: Painting, printmaking
- Notable work: Foundation of India (1986), Untouchable Couple with Om and Swastika
- Style: Expressionist; Buddhist iconography
- Movement: Dalit art movement

Savindra Sawarkar (born 1961) (also known as Savi Sawarkar) is an Indian artist, known for his use of Buddhist imagery and Dalit subjectivity. He has developed a distinct pictorial language over the course of his 40-year career, drawing from BR Ambedkar's political philosophy, neo-Buddhist imagery, and his own experiences as a Dalit.

== Early life and education ==
Savindra Sawarkar was born in 1961 in Nagpur, India. Growing up in an Ambedkarite family, he was exposed to radical ideas and critical thinking from an early age. His grandparents converted to Buddhism with Dr. Ambedkar in 1956, and his father, the first graduate in the family, was a railway officer who prioritized education.

Sawarkar obtained his Bachelor of Fine Arts degree in Drawing and Painting from Nagpur University in 1982, and his Master of Fine Arts degree in Graphic (Print Making) from the Faculty of Fine Arts at the Maharaja Sayajirao University of Baroda in 1984. As part of his master's dissertation, he focused on the work of three German Expressionist printmakers: Max Beckmann, Kaethe Kollwitz, and Otto Dix.

== Career ==
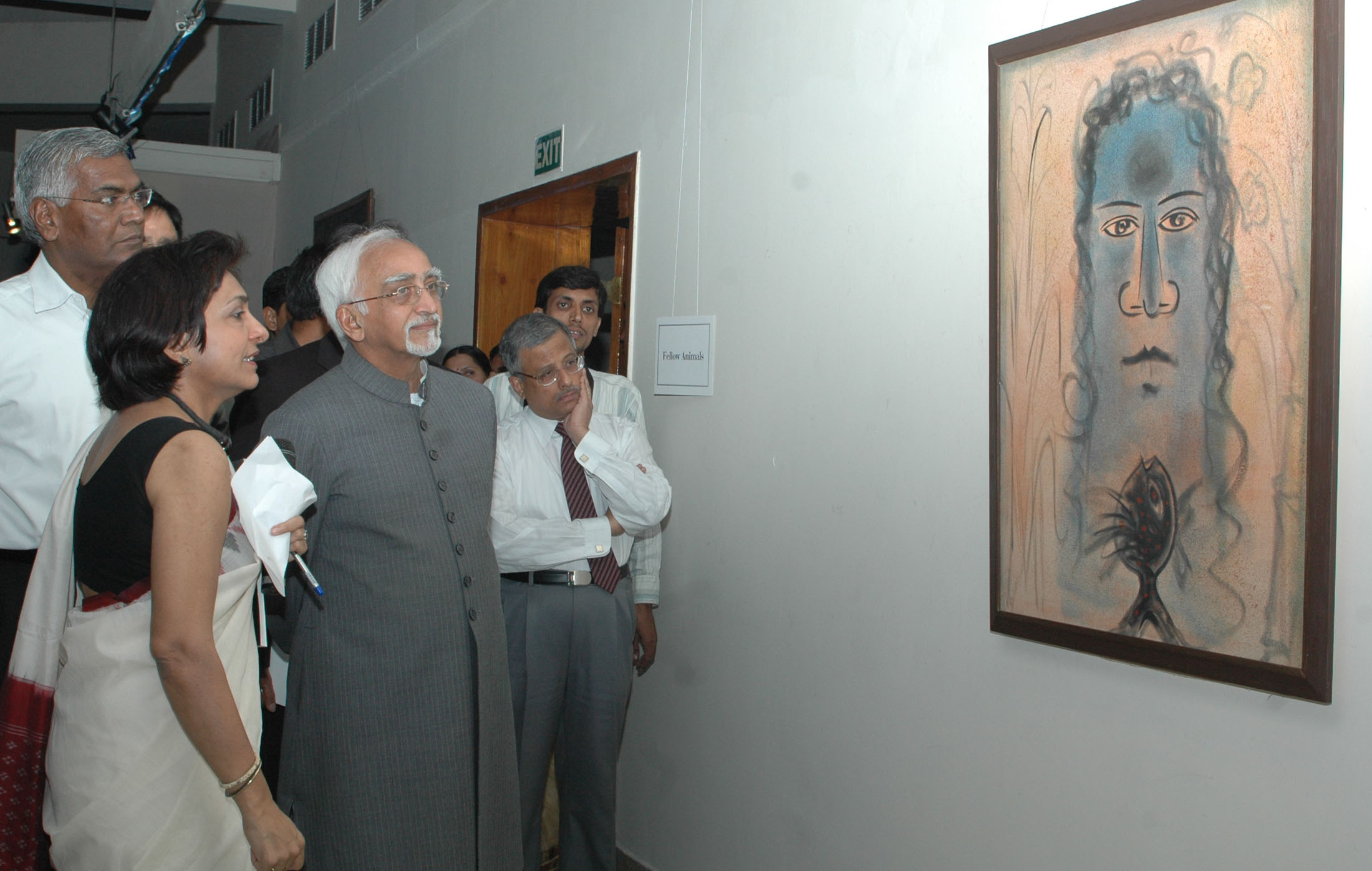
The Vice President, Mohammad Hamid Ansari going round the Painting Exhibitions of Shri Savi Sawarkar

Savindra Sawarkar has been an assistant professor at the College of Fine Arts in New Delhi since December 1996, where he teaches painting. Prior to that, he was an artist with the Indian People's Theatre Association (IPTA) Delhi chapter from December 1982 to January 1992, where he designed posters and conducted workshops. From December 1990 to January 1996, he was also an artist with the Amateur Astronomers Association Delhi (AAAD), where he was part of a research group studying the effects of astronomical phenomena on painters and artists. In the early 1990s, Sawarkar received grants to travel and study in the United States and Mexico.

Throughout the 1980s and early 1990s, Sawarkar practiced and exhibited his work in India and abroad. He worked with artists Krishna Reddy at the Lalit Kala Akademi's Garhi studios and KG Subramanyan at Santiniketan. He has held numerous solo shows, including a year-long exhibition of his paintings in Germany organized by the prestigious human rights organization 'Bread for World' in 2005–6. In 2006, an exclusive painting show of his paintings and graphics was organized at Iowa State University in the US, titled 'Savi Sawarkar and the Annihilation of Caste'. He has also participated in several national and international exhibitions, including the National Art Exhibition by Lalit Kala Academi, New Delhi in 1982, 1985, 2004 and 2008 the Eighth Triennial International Art Exhibition, New Delhi 1991, Exhibition of Indian Painters by Casa Borda, Taxco, Mexico 2002, Exhibition of Painting organized by Mittal Steel in Lazaro Cardenaz, Mexico, Asian Social Forum Hyderabad 2003, World Social Forum, Mumbai 2004, and 100 Years of Indian Art by National Gallery of Modern Art, New Delhi 1994, among others. His work was also published and presented as a book at the Gothenburg Book Fair in 2006. Sawarkar also exhibited at IIDS in 2008. He published ‘Voice for the Voiceless’, a catalog of the exhibition held at M.F. Hussain Art Gallery, Jamia Millia Islamia in 2010. In the same year, Savi exhibited at the August Savage Gallery, which was curated by Gary Tartakov.

He also illustrated a Swedish book by the name of "Detta land som aldrig var vår moder" which translates to "This land was never our Mother".

== Style and subjects ==
Sawarkar's work is characterized by bold and expressive brushstrokes, often using the colors black and red, and incorporating Buddhist symbols and imagery. His work draws inspiration from a range of sources, including oral narratives of untouchable pasts, Dalit political movements, tales of oppressed communities, and his own experiences as an artist, activist, and Dalit individual. Through the force of expressionist art, Sawarkar constructs images and icons that are both contestatory and complex, evoking a murky world with vibrant use of color. One notable example is his oil on canvas painting titled "Untouchable Couple with Om and Swastika", featured on the cover of a special issue. In this composition, dark, foreboding figures with piercing red eyes stand against a vibrant yellow background. They carry clay pots around their necks, adorned with the sacred symbols of Om and the Swastika, which allude to the historical imposition of Brahmanical hierarchy. According to Saurabh Dube, the painting confronts the burden of Hindu hierarchies and modern history, evoking the haunting presence of untouchable communities and their enduring struggles.

His seminal work, "Foundation of India" (1986), is a striking example of his style, utilizing Buddhist imagery to critique the caste system and the purusha sukta. One of his important themes relates to devadasis, a tradition whereby an adolescent girl from a scheduled caste, such as a Dalit or "lower caste" community, is married to the temple in the village and consequently, the Brahmin priest and the caste-Hindu patron sexually exploit the girl under the religious custom. Sawarkar's paintings depict the trauma of Dalit women and girls in the name of religious practices, rituals, and belief systems, foregrounding them as subjects of his art as an act of resistance to voice their pain. His paintings also show how the complex nature of sexuality operates through a religious institution and the way it is nurtured as a part of male dominance over pleasure, whereby an adolescent girl is initiated as a devadasi who is first enjoyed by the priest and later by the chief patron, usually the landlord.

== Impact and recognition ==
Art critics and scholars, such as Geeta Kapur, have noted the significance of Sawarkar's work in shaping a new Dalit iconography within Indian art.
