= Makarand Paranjape =

Indian novelist

- Born: 31 August 1960 (age 66); Ahmedabad, Gujarat
- Education: MA, PhD in English Literature
- Alma mater: St Stephen's College, Delhi; University of Illinois at Urbana–Champaign, USA
- Occupations: Former Director of Indian Institute of Advanced Studies (Shimla); Former Professor of English at Jawaharlal Nehru University (New Delhi)

Makarand R. Paranjape (born 31 August 1960) is an Indian novelist, poet, former director at the Indian Institute of Advanced Study (IIAS), Shimla, and former professor of English at the Jawaharlal Nehru University in New Delhi.

== Early life and education ==
Makarand R. Paranjape was born in 1960 in Ahmedabad, Gujarat. He was educated at Bishop Cotton Boys' School in Bangalore and at St. Stephen's College, University of Delhi, where he received a B.A. (Hons.) in English in 1980. Thereafter, he joined the University of Illinois at Urbana–Champaign for his M.A. in English Literature and, subsequently, a PhD, in 1985, on the topic Mysticism in Indian English Poetry.

== Career ==
Makarand Paranjape had started his career in 1980 as a teaching assistant at the University of Illinois at Urbana-Champaign (UIUC) and returned to India in 1986 to join the University of Hyderabad, first as a lecturer and then a reader. In 1994, he joined the Department of Humanities and Social Sciences at IIT Delhi as an associate professor and, between 1999 and 2018, served as a professor at Jawaharlal Nehru University, New Delhi.

=== IIAS Controversy ===
Paranjape was appointed as Director of IIAS in August 2018. In August 2020, 63 charges of irregularities were filed against him according to the Vice Chancellor and he was asked to resign from the post. Paranjape offered a rebuttal to his critics through an interview with The Wire in April 2021. However, it was later reported that he had violated the MoA (memorandum of association) of the institute as its Director and that it was not any clash with other specific individual heads at the institution. Paranjape resigned from the post in 2021 after he was given a farewell by the institute on 30 July 2021.

== Works and reception ==
In his coffee-table book of poems published in January 2022 as Identity's Last Secret, Paranjape discussed how he "came out of a difficult relationship." In 2013, Makarand R. Paranjape published a novel called Body Offering. The novel is a tale of a middle-aged man's extra-marital affair with a woman 25 years younger than him. The Sunday Guardian dubbed the book as one "that walked in the long shadow cast" by Russian-American writer Vladimir Nabokov's 1955 novel Lolita.

== Personal life ==
In 1987, Paranjape married Sarina, a graduate student at UIUC. In 2006, he married (Note: Sources do not discuss his divorce with Sarina. They were married as of December, 2004 and Sarina was a program officer at United States-India Educational Foundation.) Devaki Singh, daughter of Arun Singh. He is now married to Gayatri Iyer.

== Honours ==
- ICCR Chair in Indian Studies, National University of Singapore, August 2010 onwards.
- October–December 2014: Inaugural DAAD-Eric Auerbach Visiting Chair in World Literatures at the University of Tübingen, Germany.

== See also ==
- Indian English Literature
- Indian Writing in English
