= List of Punjabi tribes =

Tribes of the Punjab region of Pakistan and India

The Punjabi tribes (Punjabi: Pajābī kabīlē) are tribal groupings amongst the Punjabi people.

This is a list of Punjabi tribes. More specifically, these are tribes (mostly in Pakistan) and castes (mostly in India) inhabiting the Punjab region of South Asia, including assimilated groups.

== A ==
- Ad-Dharmi
- Agrawal
- Aheri
- Ahir
- Ahluwalia
- Arain
- Arora
- Ansari

== B ==
- Brahmin
- Bazigar

== C ==
- Chhimba Darzi
- Chuhra
- Churigar
- Chamar

== D ==
- Dhanial
- Dhobi
- Dogar

== G ==
- Gakhar
- Garha
- Gujjar

== H ==
- Hashmi

== J ==
- Jat
  - Ranjha
- Jhinwar

== K ==
- Khokhar
- Kharal
  - Khar
- Kalal
- Kamboh
- Khagga
- Khatri
- Kumhar

== L ==
- Labana
- Lohar

== M ==
- Mahtam
- Maliar
- Mazhabi
- Mughal
- Mirasi
- Mochi Hindu
- Mochi Musalman
- Mohyal

== N ==
- Nat

== P ==
- Penja

== Q ==
- Qalandar

== R ==
- Rai Sikh
- Rajput
  - Bhatti
  - Gaur
  - Janjua
  - Johiya
  - Khandowa
  - Rayeen
- Ramgarhia
- Ravidassia
- Ramdasia

== S ==
- Saini
- Sansi
- Sapera
- Satti
- Shaikh
- Sikligar
- Sunar
- Saraswat

== T ==
- Teli
- Tarkhan
- Taseer

== W ==
- Warya

== See also ==
- List of Punjabi Muslim tribes
- Punjabi people
- Ethnic groups in Pakistan
