= List of Punjabi Muslim tribes =

Following is a list of Punjabi Muslim tribes, castes and surnames, mainly those with origins in Punjab, Pakistan. Note that some of these may have a significant non-Muslim population.

== A ==
- Arain
- Awan
- Alpial
- Ansari

== B ==
- Bajwa
- Bangial
- Bharwana
- Bhatti
- Bhutta
- Budhal
- Bhinder

== C ==
- Chattha
- Cheema

== D ==
- Daulatana
- Dhandla
- Dhania
- Dogar

== G ==
- Gakhar
- Gaur
- Gujjar
- Ghumman
- Gheba
- Gondal

== H ==
- Hans

== J ==
- Janjua
- Jaswal
- Jat
- Joyia
- Jodhra

== K ==
- Kamboh
- Kathia
- Khagga
- Khandowa
- Khar
- Kharal
- Khatri
- Khattar
- Khokhar

== L ==
- Langrial
- Langah
- Lali

== M ==
- Mangral
- Minhas
- Malhi
- Mighiana

== N ==
- Nayyar
- Noon

== P ==
- Paracha
- Pachhada

== R ==
- Ranjha
- Randhawa
- Rajput
- Ranghar
- Ramay

== S ==
- Sandhu
- Satti
- Sekhon
- Shaikh
- Sial
- Sipra
- Salara
- Sukhera
- Spall

== T ==
- Tarar
- Tiwanas
- Thaheem
- Taseer

== V ==
- Virk

== W ==
- Wahla
- Warraich
- Wattoo
