= Sikhism and caste =

The relationship of Sikhism with the caste system is a complex and controversial topic in the modern-period. Although the discriminatory practices derived from the Indian caste system is repudiated by the religion's tenets, which stresses upon humanity's oneness, castes continue to be recognized and followed by much of the Sikh community, including prejudices and biases resulting from it. However, many Sikhs derive parts of their self-identity from their caste-background, affecting their relationship to the religio-cultural system, being viewed as part of one's inherent identity, social-association, or heritage and thus should be preserved. Sikhs' view of caste is influenced by religious belief, Punjabi culture, and ethnicity, considering that Sikhism is deeply influenced by Punjabi traditions and social-norms. The caste-system is practiced by both Sikhs living in the subcontinent and diasporic Sikhs.

Whilst repudiated officially by the religion, Sikh castes do exist and play a role within the Sikh community. Sikhs castes cannot be separated from Hindu castes, as nearly all caste-groupings contain followers of both religions. The Indian government maintains a system for categorizing castes in the country, which can be used to determine the Sikh castes. Jat Sikhs are the most numerous caste amongst the Sikhs. Whilst caste is commonly framed as being a negative phenomenon, it is also a positive marker of an in-group, which allows for the conceptualization of one's own community and group. A Sikh identifying with a particular caste-background does not necessarily mean someone also discriminates against others based on their caste.

Sikhs have remained a relatively homogeneous ethnic group with exceptions. Caste may still be practiced by some Sikhs, despite Guru Nanak's calls for treating everyone equally in Guru Granth Sahib. (Note: Guru Nanak has mentioned in his first composition of Jap Ji Sahib, which is recited daily by all practicing Sikhs that all souls are to be treated with care and respect as Waheguru is the Giver of all souls. "The Guru has given me this one understanding: there is only the One, the Giver of all souls. May I never forget Him!", Guru Granth Sahib, 2 Guru Nanak said that blessings are rained down when the lowly person, regardless of any background are cared for. "In that place where the lowly are cared for-there, the Blessings of Your Glance of Grace rain down.", Guru Granth Sahib, 15 Guru Nanak had spoken we need to prize humility above all and thus caste is not an issue. "One who takes pride in wealth and lands is a fool, blind and ignorant. One whose heart is mercifully blessed with abiding humility, O Nanak, is liberated here, and obtains peace hereafter." Granth Sahib, 278.) Along with Guru Nanak, other Sikh gurus had also denounced the hierarchy of the caste system, however, they all belonged to the same caste, the Khatris. Most Sikhs belong to the Jat caste, which is traditionally an agriculturist class in occupation. Despite being lesser in numbers, the Khatri and Arora castes wield considerable influence within the Sikh community. Other common Sikh castes include Ahluwalias (brewers), Kambojs or Kambos (rural caste), Ramgarhias (carpenters), Brahmins (priestly-class), Rajputs (kshatriyas – warriors), Sainis, Rai Sikh (ironsmiths), Labanas (merchants), Kumhars (potters), Mazhabi (cleaners), Ramdasia, and Ravidasias (Chamar – tanners).

Some Sikhs, especially those belonging to the landowning dominant castes, have not shed all their prejudices against the Dalits. While Dalits were allowed entry into the village gurdwaras, in some gurdwaras, they were not permitted to cook or serve langar (communal meal). Therefore, wherever they could mobilize resources, the Sikh Dalits of Punjab have tried to construct their own gurdwara and other local level institutions in order to attain a certain degree of cultural autonomy. In 1953, Sikh leader and activist Master Tara Singh succeeded in persuading the Indian government to include Sikh castes of the converted untouchables in the list of scheduled castes. In the Shiromani Gurdwara Prabandhak Committee, 20 of the 140 seats are reserved for low-caste Sikhs.

Other castes with over 1,000 members include the Arain, Bhatra, Bairagi, Bania, Basith, Bawaria, Bazigar, Bhabra, Chamar, Chhimba (cotton farmers), Darzi, Dhobi, Gujar, Jhinwar, Kahar, Kalal, Kumhar, Lohar, Mahtam, Megh, Mirasi, Mochi, Nai, Ramgharia, Sansi, Sudh, Tarkhan, and Kashyap castes. Karnail Singh Panjoli, a member of the Shiromani Gurdwara Prabandhak Committee, says that there are several communities within the term Nanakpanthis too. Apart from Sindhi Hindus, "There are groups like Sikhligarh, Vanjaarey, Nirmaley, Lubaney, Johri, Satnamiye, Udaasiyas, Punjabi Hindus, etc. who call themselves Nanakpanthis despite being Hindus.

Most writings on Sikh castes tend to centre around the most dominant group: the Jat-Sikhs. The Jat-Sikhs are dominant within Sikh organizations and rural-settings. The mobile Jat-Sikhs have given form to the masculinized image of Sikhs. Punjabi music and popular culture have also been deeply influenced by Jat-Sikhs. Diasporic Jat-Sikh communities in the West have also been documented by scholars, in-addition to their role in the patriarchy by feminist Sikh writers.

== Terminology ==
Within the Punjabi context, a caste is known as a zat (related to jati). The term baradari refers to an exended kinship. A sub-caste is known as a got in Punjabi (gotra in Hindi). A got is an exogamous grouping within a particular caste (known as a zat in Punjabi and jati in Hindi). A zat is an endogamous caste grouping, which contains gots under it.

== Religious view ==
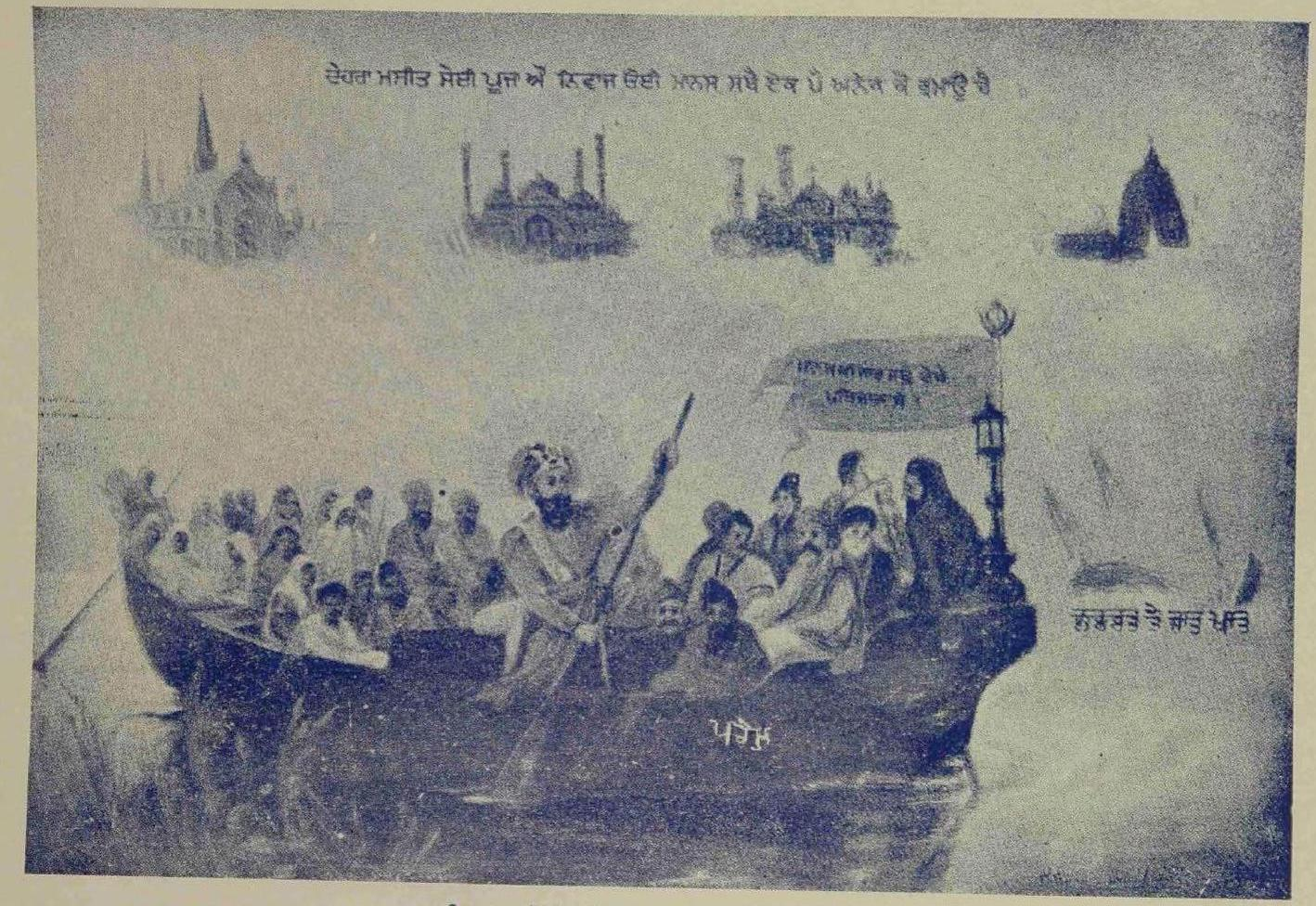
Illustration of Guru Gobind Singh commanding a ship with people of all castes, published in the Phulwari magazine (April 1928 issue)

Caste-based discrimination is against the egaliterian tenets of the Sikh faith. The Sikh gurus and scriptures speak against caste-based hierarchies and advocated for caste and gender equality in the real-world through both religious belief and practice.

Call everyone noble, none is lowborn: there is only one potter, God, who has fashioned everyone alike. God's is the one light that pervades all creation.

— Guru Nanak, Guru Granth Sahib, page 62

Another verse of Guru Nanak in the Guru Granth Sahib states:

Recognise the jot [light] within all and inquire not the caste, as there is no caste in the next world.

— Guru Nanak, Guru Granth Sahib, page 349

The Sikh gurus focused on worldliness in their efforts to promote caste-equality rather than promoting beliefs about caste-equality in the afterlife, such as the Beghampura ("the land without sorrow") espoused by Bhagat Ravidas. Caste-barriers were broken by the langar institution, which violated principles of ritual pollution as it made everyone sit together to eat, including with lower-castes. The Sikh gurus used the vernacular language to reach the common-masses rather than language geared toward a particular elite. Furthermore, karah prashad is distributed equally within gurdwaras and at Sikh events without paying attention to the receiver's caste or social-background. Everyone is welcome at gurdwaras, regardless of their caste. Sikhism lacks a priestly-class comparable to the role Brahmins play in Hinduism.

Thus, Sikh religious leaders have requested Sikhs to cease practicing caste and align their practices with Sikh beliefs regarding caste, which admonishes the caste system. Whilst individual Sikhs may choose to identify with their caste-background, they must regard their fellow Sikhs as equals regardless of their caste. Caste is considered one of the five thugs that inhibit spirituality.

Whilst varna classifications and concept of untouchability are found within the caste system are sanctified in Brahminical Hinduism, they cannot be relegated as not being unrelated to Sikhism as these influences continue to impact Sikhs.

== Social practices and discrimination ==
Caste continues to play a role in Sikh marriage, settlement, political, and kinship patterns/practices despite many Sikhs denying the existence of caste within the Sikh community. Thus, the prevalence of caste creates a feeling of "moral guilt" within the psyches of many practicing Sikhs, including Sikh scholars.Furthermore, there exists caste-specific gurdwaras which are dedicated to a particular caste, both in India and the diaspora.

Whilst Sikhism as a religion advocates for caste-equality, the success of achieving such a state has been contested by some Sikhs, especially those who now increasingly self-identity as being Ravidassia, Valmiki, or Ambedkarite. Thus, a focus of criticism has been on hypocrisy between teachings and practice in the lived-experience. Many Sikhs continue to use caste as a cultural-identity marker. Other Sikh judge people based on their caste, making inferences about someone's social-status, ability, or personality based on their caste. There also exist certain stereotypes associated with particular castes.

Sikhs practice the caste-system in a unique manner when compared to other communities of the subcontinent. This is observed as follows:

Sikh caste differs from its more classical antecedents. . . . Nor is there any specific caste group comparable to the kind of division that the textbook view of caste suggests

— Surinder Jodhka, Caste in Contemporary India, page 583

Many Sikhs identify themselves as being Jat, Ramgharia, Bhatra, Ravidassi, etc. The decision to identify with one's caste does not necessarily mean they practice caste-discrimination. When some castes converted to Sikhism, they became known by new caste-identifying names. For examples, members of low-caste groups such Chuhras and Chamars who adopted Sikhism became known as Rangretias and Mazhabis. The Valmikis also are sourced from the Chuhra caste. Another group which emerged from low-castes are the Ad-Dharms. These new low-caste identifying markers "reify and perpetuate the caste system, albeit in indirect ways".

Sikh castes (including Dalit Sikhs) tend to practice endogamy, that is marrying another member of the same caste, which "[reinforces] a sense of continuity and group". Furthermore, sustaining one's family-honour (izzat) is tied together with caste-identity, especially when considering marriage, as marrying within your caste is viewed as preserving your familial-honour, with this deriving from Punjabi culture and being followed by Punjabi-Sikhs. Low-caste Sikhs may face discrimination when looking for a marriage partner outside of their caste, as others will inquire about their background. Despite this, intercaste marriages are increasing within the Sikh community, especially in the diaspora.

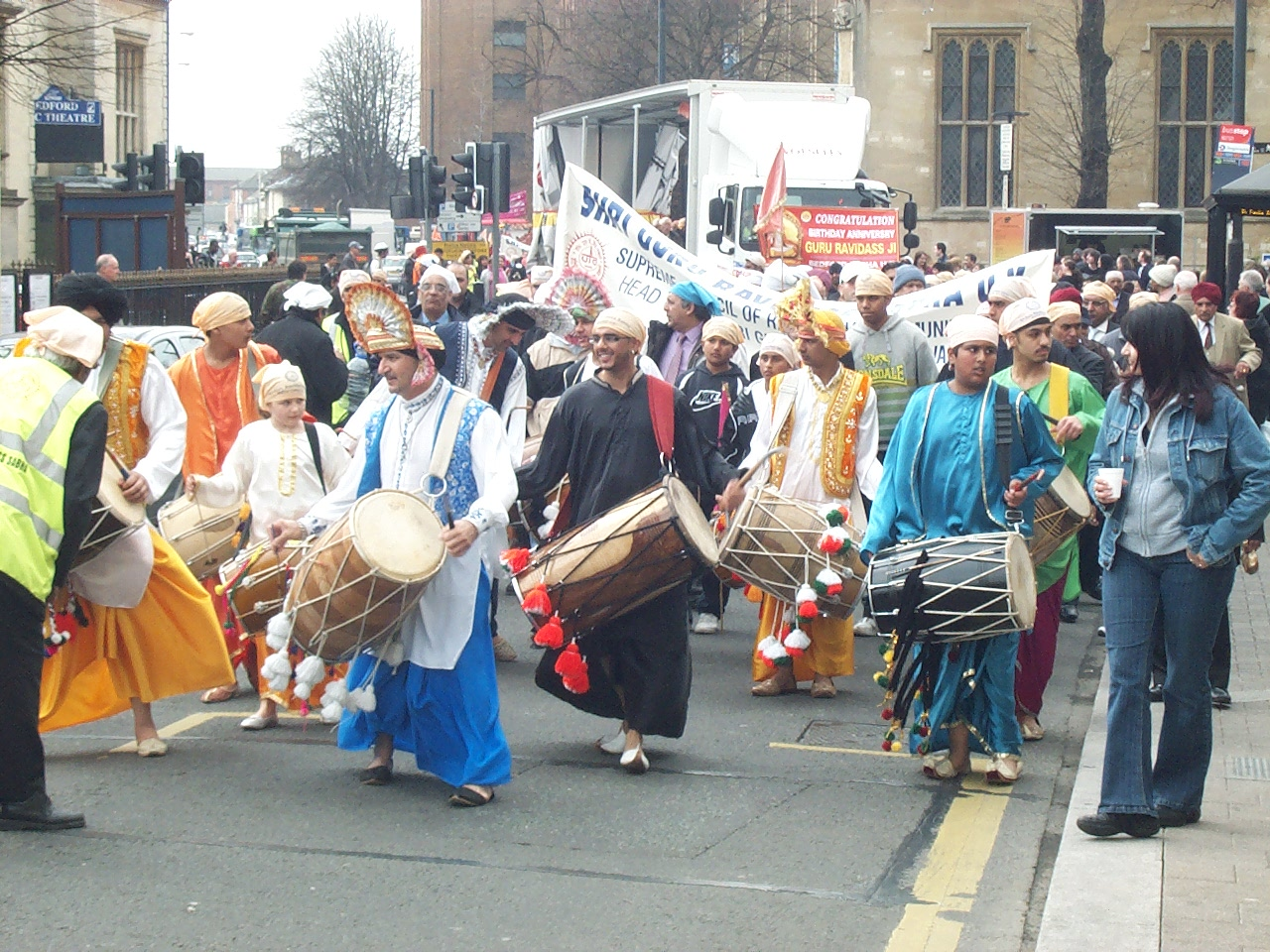
Ravidassia procession in Bedford, Bedfordshire, England

Within the caste system, there are multiple hierarchies interplaying with one another, thus one should caution from oversimplying, as it may not reflect the ground-reality. The issue of untouchability still plagues Sikhs, which has led to the formation of separate Valmiki and Ravidasi identities away from mainstream Sikhism.

== Categorization ==
Using the Indian government's scheme for categorizing Indian castes, the Sikh castes can be listed into "classificatory-clusters" using the Punjab government's designations:

- Forward Castes (FCs; general castes/upper castes): prominent castes of this category include the Jats, Brahmins, Khatris, Aroras, Rajputs, Mahatons, Sainis. These caste-groups were considered to be "privileged". The Khatris and Aroras were mostly urbanized whilst the Jats were usually rural-inhabitants.
- Other Backward Classes (OBCs; known as "Backward"): there are more than sixty castes or groups included in this category. Around 31% of the population of Punjab are from OBC-backgrounds, with the majority of Punjabi OBCs identifying as Sikhs. The category can be further subdivided into three groups, with prominent examples:
  - Farmers: Kambohs
  - Artisans: Ramgarhias (Tarkhans), Sonars, Nais, Chhimbas
  - Servicemen: watermen caste (Jhinwars)
- Scheduled Castes (SCs; known as Dalits): there are thirty-nine Sikh SC groups, such as the Mazhabi, Ramdasias, Mahatam (Rai Sikhs), Mochi, Kabirpanthis (Julaha), Sikligars, Balmikis. 32% of the population of Punjab state is from a SC-background, which is twice the national-average. Two-thirds of the SC population of Punjab identify as Sikhs. A substantial proportion of Punjabi SCs who identify formally as Hindus still have affinities to Sikhism. Not all of the scheduled caste Sikh groups were considered untouchables, for example the Rai Sikhs (Mahatams) were not considered untouchables, but rather were historically marginalized but not to the extent of untouchability.
- Scheduled Tribes (STs): during British-rule in Punjab, the Bazigars, Sansi, and Bouria were categorized as tribes but have since been included into the SCs group.

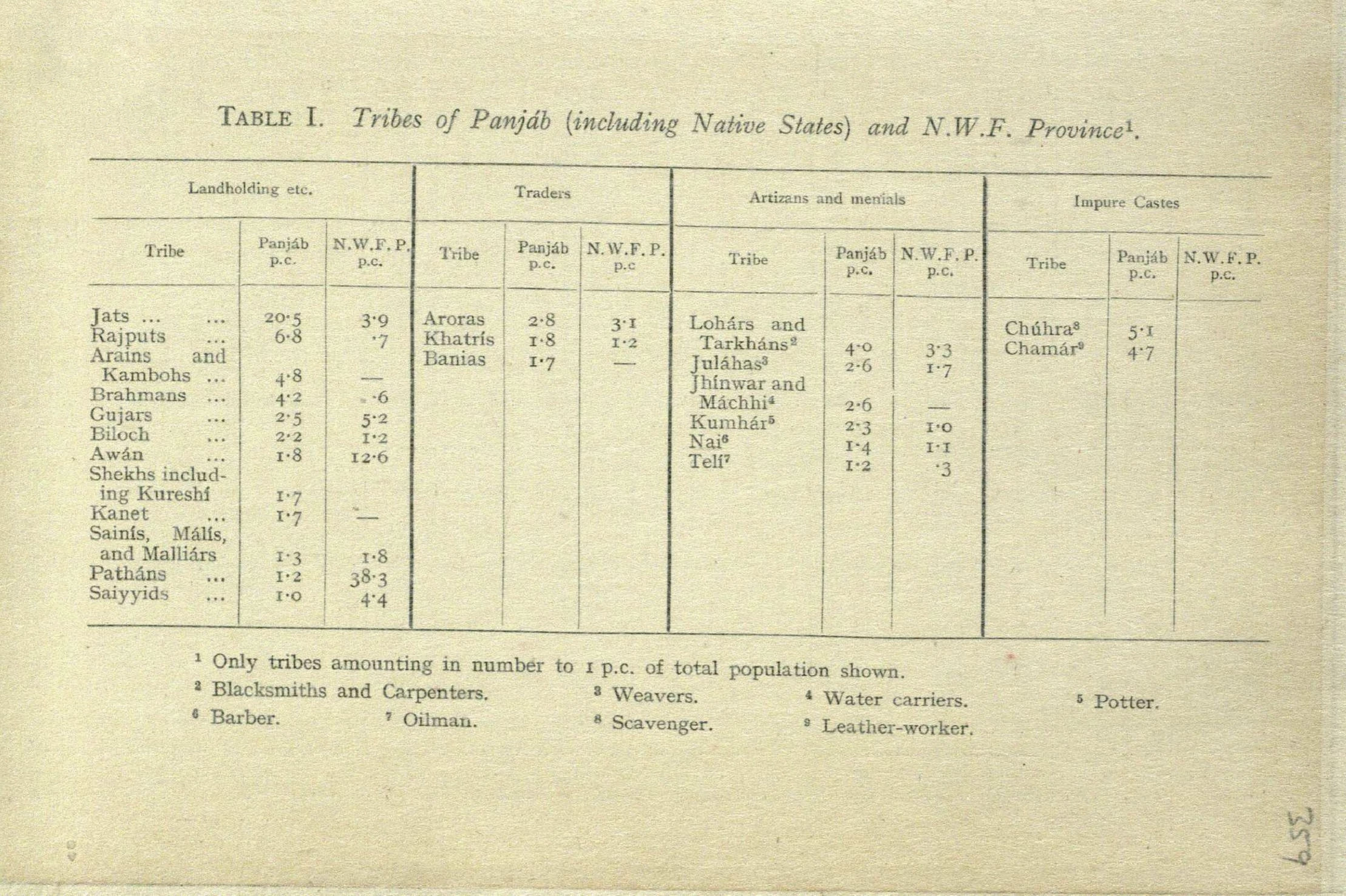
Caste and tribe classification table by traditional or predominant occupation for Punjab Province and N.W.F.P., British India, published in 'The Panjab, North-West Frontier Province and Kashmir' (1916)

Castes which are listed as scheduled castes are allotted special quotas (reservations) in the representative bodies, government jobs, and state-funded educational institutions. During British-rule in Punjab, the Bazigars, Sansi, Bouria, and other tribes were categorized as tribes under the Tribal Act but have since then had been included into the SCs group in 1952. Some of these tribes are recognized as STs in other states but in Punjab they are recognized as SCs. In the late 1990s, the Ramgarhias were classified as OBC in Punjab. In 2001 in Punjab, thirty-seven SCs were recognized, with two more, the Mahatam (Rai Sikhs) and Mochi, being inducted as SCs prior to the 2011 census, with the total number of SC castes in Punjab now being thirty-nine. The Rai Sikhs were inducted as a scheduled-caste in Punjab in 2005, despite never being subjected to untouchability but rather being historically marginalized. There are currently nearly seventy castes listed as OBCs in Punjab, with naming variations for the same caste-groups existing. The OBC category was reframed by the Indian government in 1990 and includes a diversity of caste-groupings, such as the Ramgarhias (formally listed as Tarkhans and Lohars), Labanas, Kambojs, Jhinwars, and Gujjars.

H. S. Bhatti (2000) classifies the Punjabi castes and groups based on traditional occupational categories, namely:

- Kheti (agricultural): Jats, Kambohs, Saini, Labana, and Rai Sikhs
- Vapar (trading): Bania, Khatri, Arora, Brahmin, and Kalal/Ghumiar
- Lag (service/artisan): Lohar, Tarkhan, Ghumiar, Naee, Suniyar Jheur, Chimba, Dhobi, Julaha, Teli, Mirasi, Chamar, and Chuhra
- Sphaee (menial): Chuhra, Chamar, Jheur, Dhobi

The major caste-groups and their traditional occupational-role, as they function locally in Punjab, is as follows:

| Caste-group | Traditional occupation(s) and role(s) |
|---|---|
| Jat | Agriculture |
| Brahmin | Priest, cook |
| Baniya | Grocer, trader |
| Suniyar | Goldsmith |
| Lohar | Blacksmith |
| Tarkhan | Carpenter |
| Kamboh | Agriculture, trade/service |
| Saini | Agriculture, services |
| Lubana | Agriculture, services |
| Rai Sikh | Agriculture and other roles |
| Rajput | Agriculture, services |
| Khatri | Trade |
| Arora | Trade, agriculture |
| Darji/Chimba | Tailor |
| Ghumiar | Potter |
| Julaha | Weaver |
| Naee | Barber |
| Dhobi | Washerman |
| Teli | Oil-presser |
| Jheur | Water-bearer |
| Mirasi | Bard |
| Chamar | Leatherworker, cobbler |
| Chuhra | Scavenger |

Amongst the caste-groups in Punjab, those engaged in agricultural pursuits were seen as superior, with those engaged in trade in the middle, services were seen as lowly, and beggars were regarded as the worst, this is symbolized by the traditional saying: uttam kheti madham vapar nikhidh chakri bheekh murdar ("agriculture is the best, while the trade is placed in the middle and services are utterly useless and begging is like being dead"). Jats were the dominant agricultural caste, being the jajmans, whilst castes who assisted in agriculture were known as laagis or kammis.

== History ==
=== Pre-colonial period ===
The caste-system in India is commonly perceived as originating from the social-hierarchal categorization prescribed in Hindu scriptures, dating to the Vedic-era or perhaps even earlier. By the 1st or 2nd century CE, the Manusmiriti (attributed to Manu) codefied the Hindu populace into four or five varnas, which were broad social-classification categorizations that were ranked according to a hierarchal-nature. Later, specific jatis (caste-groups) emerged from the ritually-described categorizations devised earlier, based along kinship and settlement systems, with different occupations coming to be associated with particular caste-groups. A dichotonomy of purity and impurity emerged, which impacted the status of women, views of the human-body, segregation, and economics. This system was imbedded in the prevailing socio-religious tradition, thus existed independently from political structures or states, and thrived independently, not needing state-patronage to exist. Caste came to influence and impact all aspects of Indian civilization and the consciousness of the inhabitants of the subcontinent. The Sikh gurus all belonged to the Khatri caste, specifically the Bedi, Trehan, Bhalla, and Sodhi clans.

Guru Nanak observed but was uncomfortable with the caste-based hierarchies and discrimination that was present during his life and considered being born as a "high-caste" to have no spiritual significance, or perhaps even being an obstacle to spiritual liberation. Guru Nanak taught that all humans were one, sharing the same divine essence, thus there is no room for discrimination based on caste in this paradigm, in-contrast to pre-existing works, such as the Manusmriti, which codified discrimination against lower-castes. Guru Nanak, who preferred to associate himself with the lower-castes, and also established the langar and pangat practices in Sikhism, which broke-down caste-barriers by making people of various castes eat together. Nanak stressed upon living the life of a householder and mingling with lower-castes, not practicing ascetism and escaping into the wilderness, as asceticism did not solve the root issue of casteism but rather avoided it. Guru Nanak's innovative caste-equality was continued by the later gurus. Guru Arjan constructed the Darbar Sahib shrine in Amritsar with four-doors to symbolize the religion's openness to all, regardless of their caste. He included Bhagat Bani into the Adi Granth which expounded anti-caste views and Guru Gobind Singh established the Khalsa in 1699, which is a casteless order. Forty-one verses authored by Ravidas, a Chamar (one of the low castes), were included in the Guru Granth Sahib during its compilation. Whilst the bhagats had explained the equality of castes in reaching the afterlife, Guru Nanak practiced caste-equality in the real-world, such as by publicly interacting with lower-castes directly. Guru Tegh Bahadur's severed head was said to have been brought to Guru Gobind Singh from Delhi by Bhai Jaitha, a Dalit Sikh. This feat helped popularize Sikhism amongst lower-castes and was viewed as an event that showed the caste-equality in Sikhism. In-fact, there is a perception that the rise of Sikhism is due to it being a rebellion against pre-existing social hierarchies and discrimination. Sikhism abolished all superstitions relating to jati and varna.

Whilst the Sikh gurus clearly expressed their disapproval of notions of ritual purity or pollution based on caste, it is still a matter of contention amongst scholars regarding if the Sikh gurus aimed to eradicate the entire caste-system as a whole. Some scholars, such as Banerjee, have argued that such a feat would have been impossible as the caste-system had formed the basis of Hindu society for centuries but rather "... orthodoxy could hardly resist a breach in the citadel". Meanwhile, Talib argued that Guru Nanak focused on the practical-side of moving toward an equal society. Whilst the Sikh gurus clearly were against discriminating others based on their caste, it is still being debated if they wanted to abolish the caste-system as a whole, which marked individuals as belonging to an "in-group", considering that all the Sikh gurus belonged specifically to one caste: the Khatris. Furthermore, the Sikh gurus married within their own caste and had arranged their children's marriages within the same caste as well, thus the Sikh gurus may have accepted caste as being a social-order but not as a means of discrimination against others. Thus, whilst the Sikh gurus preached against vertical hierarchies, they did not seem to be against horizontal zaats, as there is a paucity of evidence that the Sikh gurus had rejected the importance of kinship-boundaries and the institutions of family, marriage, and zaat-biradaris. According to W. H. McLeod, whilst the Sikh gurus condemned the caste system, they "were not concerned with the institution of caste as such, merely with the belief that it possesses soteriological significance".

... Caste can remain, but not the doctrine that that one's access to salvation depends on one's caste ranking. The way of salvation is open to all regardless of caste. Stripped of its religious content it can retain the status of a harmless social convention... ... A reasonable conclusion appears to be that whereas they [Sikh gurus] were vigorously opposed to the vertical distinction of caste they were content to accept it in terms of its horizontal linkages

— W. H. McLeod, The Evolution of the Sikh Community: Five Essays, 88

=== British period ===
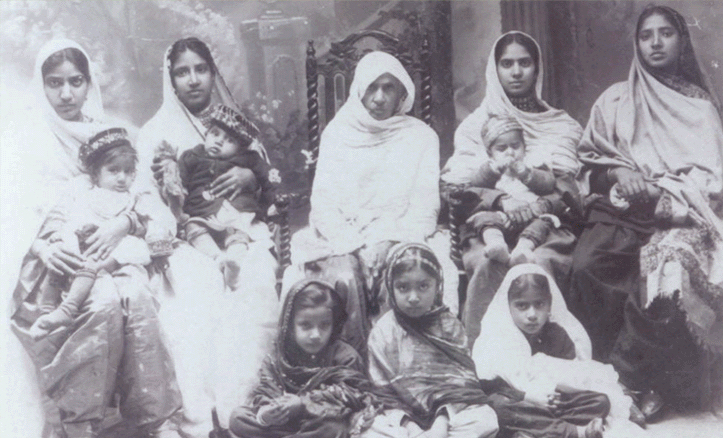
Photograph of Khatri Sikh women and children of the Bhalla gotra (clan) of Sri Hargobindpur, Gurdaspur district, Punjab, ca.1920

The natural and evolution of caste amongst Sikhs during the British period were influenced by administrative policy and also by religious reform movements. It was a period of change regarding religious boundaries and identities, with caste being a central focal point in that evolution. The British were the first ones to scientifically record caste in the Punjab and its manifestation among different groups, this was done through census, reports, and micro-studies. The British noted that the caste system existed across Punjabi society regardless of religious-lines, however it operated rather uniquely in Punjab when compared to other regions of India, with the caste system in Punjab lacking rigid hierarchies and being more akin to European social classes. Furthermore, groups such as Brahmins, who are ranked high in the traditional Hindu caste system, do not have such dominance in Punjab, with it being noted that Brahmins can be viewed as outcastes by those who would be classified as Shudras. There was no agreement on what Vaishyas or Kshatriyas consisted of, nor was any group really considered as Shudras but rather this term was used as an insult for those perceived to be lower. Brahmins in southern Punjab were recorded as having scant knowledge of the Hindu scriptures. Thus, the Brahmins in Punjab were not akin to being a priestly-class as they were in other regions of the subcontinent, but were more aptly landowners who followed the prevailing sociocultural traditions of the region rather than Sanskritic norms. Thus, in Punjab the Brahmins were not the dominant social-class, in-contrast to regions of India which closely followed the four-varna model. Rather, in rural Punjab the caste system was "invariably woven around the agrarian economy and control over land" rather than being centred on a four-fold varna hierarchy. A rural system that interplayed with this reality was the jajmani system (or sepedari system), based on agrarian class relations, with the landowning class being the dominant group and other classes forming unequal relations with the dominant group.

With us brahmins were an underprivileged class and exercised little or no influence on the community. ... Our brahmins did not as a rule even have the role of teachers, because until the British opened regular schools, teaching was done by Muslim mullahs in the mosques or by Sikh granthis ... in the Gurudwaras. Our brahmins were rarely erudite; in fact, many of them were barely literate, possessing only a perfunctory knowledge of rituals and knowing just the necessary mantras by heart

— Prakash Tandon, Punjabi Century, 1857-1947 (1988), page 76

The introduction of census enumeration in Punjab by the British led to the association of the strength of a particular community to its population, with it being tied to government employment and political representation. The numbers converting to Christianity had made the upper-caste Punjabi Hindu and Sikh elite nervous. The arrival of Christian missionaries in the region and their proselytization led to many, predominantly lower-castes, to adopt Christianity. The 1911 census was the first census where Sikhs could self-identify as Sikhs, where as in previous censuses they had to have uncut hair and not use tobacco to be counted as Sikhs. The 1931 British Indian census recorded that since the 1921 census, the population of Sikhs belonging to the Arora and Chamar castes declined whilst other Sikh castes like the Chuhras, Jats, Rajputs, Sainis, and Tarkhans experienced population growth. The 1931 census was also the last to enumerate the entire population based on caste.

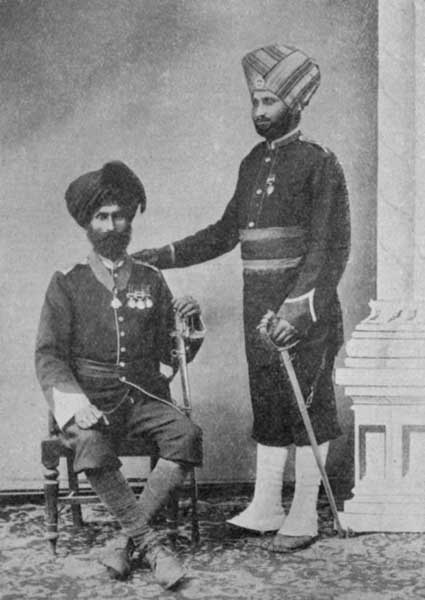
Photograph of Jat Sikh officers (father and son) of the British Indian Army, published in 'The Panjab, North-West Frontier Province and Kashmir' (1916)

The censuses were not only used to categorize the population but also were used to assign qualities to particular caste-groups, such as by marking certain castes as martial races, which allowed for biased recruitment in-favour of those from caste-backgrounds that were deemed suitably martial. The British colonial military in India preferentially recruited Sikhs from particular castes, chiefly the Jat Sikhs and Rajput Sikhs, whilst Brahmin Sikhs were recruited for pay havildar roles and Khatris specifically from agricultural backgrounds were also selected for service. Sainis and Kambohs were also recruited. A. H. Bingley recommended that the British avoid recruiting Arora Sikhs into the military. Lower-caste Sikhs were also analyzed and discriminated based upon their background, with Lohanas (being recruited for Pioneer regiments), Mahatams/Mahatoms, and Kamboh castes being recruited, whilsts Nais and Chhimbas were usually not recruited. The Ramgarhias (consisting of Tarkhans) generally did not seek employment in the British colonial military. Some castes were recruited for specific roles in the military, such as the Jhiwars (known as Meharas if they are Sikh) being enrolled to serve as langris (regimental cooks). With regards to the untouchable groups, namely the Ramdasias, Mazabhis (Mazbhis), Rangretas, and Chuhras, the Ramdasias and Mazabhis saw recruitment in the British Indian military.

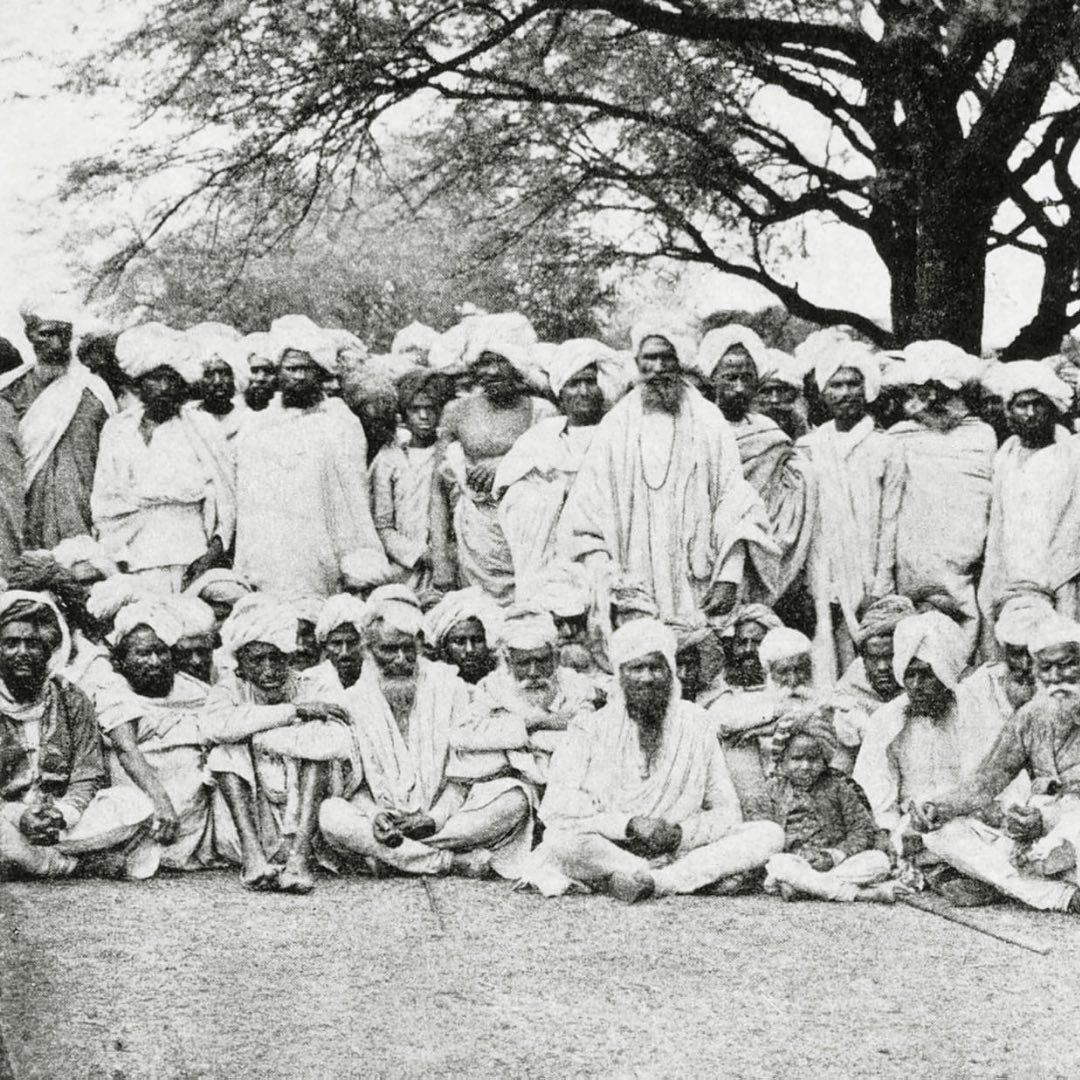
Photograph of Sikh peasants attending the district magistrate's court on circuit, circa late-19th century

When the British annexed the Sikh Empire in 1849, they opted for the Ryotwari system rather than the Zamindari system for British Punjab. The British instituted a newer forms of land revenue systems, which altered the traditional entitlements over agricultural land into formalized ownership rights. The ownership rights were mostly bestowed to those from agrarian-caste-backgrounds (chiefly Jats), thus leaving Dalits and merchant (trade/commerce) associated caste backgrounds without any typical means to obtain agricultural land ownership. Furthermore, agricultural reforms related to the adoption of new land revenue policies made it so that cultivators had to pay their land taxes in-cash, this in-turn pushed them toward farming cash-crops, which led to the increased need for credit, meaning they had to borrow money from moneylenders. Moneylenders and merchants were usually Hindus from Bania, Mahajan, Khatri, and Arora caste-backgrounds whilst the cultivators who borrowed from them were predominantly Jats (from all three of the main religious groups). When a cultivator failed to pay their debts to the moneylender they borrowed from, this led to the dispossession of their land to the moneylender, which was a source of major inter-caste conflict at the time. Therefore, the British put into law the Land Alienation Act 1900 which safeguarded the cultivators from the moneylenders. The legislation classified Punjabi castes into two principle groups: agriculturalists and non-agriculturalists. The act did not allow the sale and transfer of land from an agriculturalist to a non-agriculturalist caste member. Trading castes and Dalis were clubbed as non-agriculturalists. To reduce agricultural strains due to demographic pressures in eastern and central Punjab, the British set-up canal colonies in which new land in formerly uncultivated areas of Punjab was allocated to agriculturalists, which benefitted the Jats, Sainis, and Rajputs, who had a background in agriculture. Later-on, retired native soldiers in the British Indian military were allocated land, which benefited castes that the British had preferentially recruited into its colonial military.

The onset of British-rule in Punjab is tied with the rise of the Ad-Dharmi movement, as the military cantonment established by the British in Jalandhar required leather boots. The Chamars, who traditionally are leatherworkers, were able to profit off of this and produced the items for the British military, which helped increase the community's financial and labour-independence from upper-castes. Eventually, the Chamar leatherworkers were able to expand their business operations in Punjabi towns and cities but also outside of Punjab to regions like Bengal (in Calcutta) where they worked in leather-tanneries, and even overseas to North America. One of these Chamars was a man named Mangoo Ram, would later founded the Ad-Dharmi movement. Mangoo Ram worked abroad in the US for several years and returned to Punjab, where he led a movement against the hierarchal caste-system, which he believed was rooted in Hinduism. Rather than converting to another religion, Mangoo Ram instead championed a cause in 1925–26 for recognition of the community's mores as a separate religion, known as Ad-Dharam. The movement successfully convinced the British to recognize the community as a separate religion (quom) in the 1931 British Indian census, being listed separately from other religious categories. However, the movement eventually subsided and died-off but was later revived by the separatist Ravidassias in the 1980s.

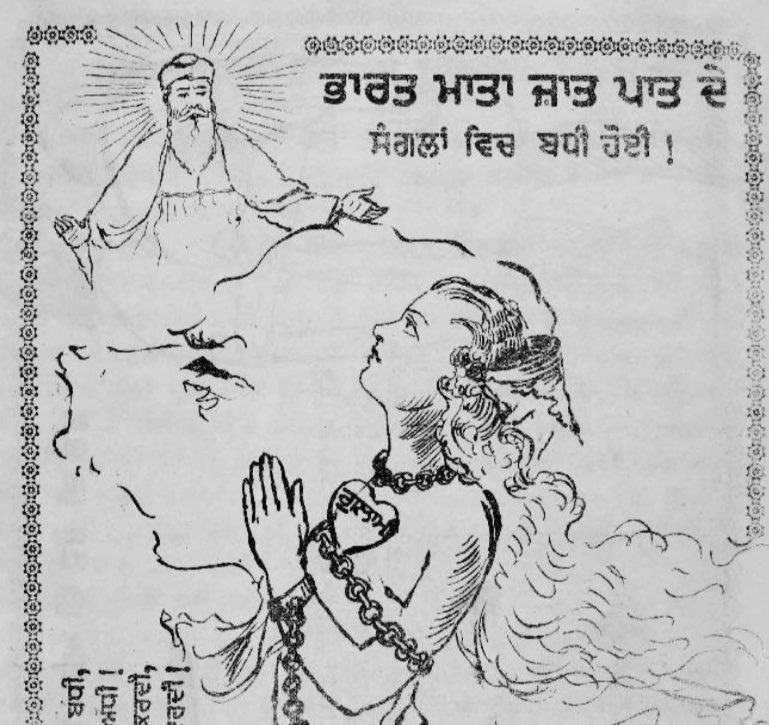
Illustration of Guru Nanak liberating the enslaved form of India from the peril of untouchability, published in the Phulwari magazine (April 1928 issue)

Amongst the religious reform movements of colonial Punjab, the Arya Samaj were popular amongst upper-caste, urban Punjabi Hindus. Whilst the Arya Samaj denounced casteism and Brahminism, their practice of ritual purification of Dalits through shuddhi meant that caste-based beliefs and discriminatory practices persisted amongst members of the Arya Samaj. In-response to the provocative Arya Samaj, the Sikhs kickstarted their own reformist organizations which promoted that Sikhs were a separate religious group from Hindus, using the existence of caste as a means to assert that Sikhs are a separate religious community. The Singh Sabha reformers had advocated that the absence of caste in Sikhism was one of the things which differentiates Sikhs from Hindus, claiming that the caste system was sourced from Hindu scripture and the Sikh gurus had rejected it. Thus, caste was presented as being a Hindu phenomenon rather than a Sikh one, despite this not reflecting the reality in Punjab, where caste was still prevalent amongst Punjabi Sikhs. During this time, Sikh shrines were being controlled by hereditary mahants, many of whom openly discriminated against Dalits at the gurdwaras, thus this helped lead to the Gurdwara Reform movement, resulting in the establishment of the SGPC in November 1920 and the Akali Dal the following month. Mahants barred lower-castes from entering Sikh gurdwaras, including the Golden Temple in Amritsar, which the reformist Sikhs advocated against and wanted open-access to all without any emphasis placed on an individual's caste. With the establishment of the SGPC, its reformist management ensured to enlist low-caste Sikhs to work as pathis, ragis, and sewadars. In rural Punjab, up until the early 20th century the rural, upper-caste Sikhs had consulted local Brahmins to conduct their rituals, but there after rather than Brahmins, they consulted Sikh granthis and the maryada, due to the influence of the reformist Sikhs. The granthis had been educated at the Sikh Missionary College in Amritsar, a reformist institution.

=== Post-independence ===
After the partition of Punjab and independence of India, the new Indian government treated the Sikh caste issue with delicacy. On 25 May 1949, Vallabhbhai Patel informed the Constituent Assembly that provisions for minorities, except for those for the SCs, was abolished, with an exception given for the four untouchable Sikh castes. Patel stated the following on the matter:

The Sikhs themselves have thought that certain classes of people amongst them, who have been recent converts, and who were originally Scheduled Caste Hindus, are suffering from the fault of the Hindu community. The Sikhs are suffering for the fault of the Sikh community and nobody else. Really, as a matter of fact, these converts are not Scheduled Castes or ought not to be Scheduled Castes; because in the Sikh religion, there is no such thing as untouchability or any classification or difference of classes.... The Sikhs, today it should be recognised, have suffered from various causes and we have to regard with considerable tenderness of feeling in taking into consideration their existing state of mind and provide as far as possible to meet with the situation.

— Vallabhbhai Patel

Patel in a later speech made reference to the conversion of Dalit Sikhs to Christianity in Pakistan and requested the scheduled caste Sikhs to forget they are scheduled caste. Sikh representatives to the committee for setting-up the Indian constitution admitted that there existed "untouchable" Sikh castes and requested that special reservations be allocated for them as SCs, fearing that otherwise the SC Sikhs would abandon their religion and convert to Hinduism to claim benefits as SC Hindus if such affirmative-action provisions were not available to them. After intensive lobbying by Sikh representatives, four Sikh SCs, namely the Mazabhis, Ramdasias, Kabirpanthis, and Sikligars, were identified as being eligible for political reservation by the Minority Committee, but other Sikh SCs were not included. Although not being formally recognized as SCs, the other lower-caste Sikhs did not move toward Hinduism and remained steadfast with their commitment to Khalsa Sikhism, in-contrast to what anxious Sikh representatives had predicted. Prior to the partition of Punjab in 1947, Khatri/Arora Sikhs were prevalent in the Pothohar region of Punjab (such as in Jhelum, Rawalpindi, Peshawar, Bannu, and Kuhat), which was given to Pakistan. Thus, many Khatri/Arora Sikhs after 1947 settled in New Delhi in India, with the slur bhappa developing as a pejorative to describe the community, especially used to demean urban Sikhs engaging in business.

The Punjabi village studies conducted in the 1950s and 1960s came to varying conclusions on the nature of the caste system amongst rural Punjabis. Marian Smith (1953) argued that Sikhs limited rituals in their religious practices and did not follow any ritual boundaries. Joyce Pettigrew (1975) stated that there was an absence of caste-based rules regarding purity and pollution amongst rural Jat Sikhs of Ludhiana, claiming that the social organization and values system of Jat Sikhs differed greatly from "Hindu India", instead being based on family unit and the family's honour, prestige, respect, and reputation. Pettigrew also observed that the Jat Sikhs were hegemonic over and abusive to the Mazhabi Sikhs in the rural setting. Paul Hershman (1981) opined that despite the caste system appearing different in rural Punjab, there still were caste-based divisions amongst Sikhs, alongside the practice of untouchability, with upper-castes of Punjabi villages treating their local untouchable populations with disdain. I. P. Singh (1975, 1977) conducted research in rural Amritsar in the 1950s and recorded that there were two main groups of castes in Punjabi villages: the 'touchable Sardars' and those deemed 'untouchable'. The untouchables consisted of Mazhabis whilst the touchables were Jats, Kambohs, Tarkhans, Kumhars, Sunars, and Nais. However, the Jats still considered themselves to be superior to the other touchable castes yet did not avoid nor discriminate against other touchable castes. Thus, the touchable castes ate together, shared the same drinking water from a common source, visit each other's dwellings, and celebrate each-other's milestones, such as weddings and other celebrations. However, Mazhabis and other untouchable castes were not treated in the same manner but rather were excluded and discriminated, with their dwellings being located far away from the village. For example, if a Mazhabi participated in the village-feast, they were separated from the rest of the participants and were the last served food. The untouchables also obtained their water from a different well meant for their use. Sometimes Jat landowners visited the houses of their Mazhabi labourers as an act of patronage. During heavy-drinking sessions, such as during Holi or Lohri celebrations, caste-barriers in the rural village evaporated and untouchables drank together with touchables, with the Mazhabis traditionally being the ones who brewed alcohol. At the local village gurdwara, no caste-distinctions was observed and all the castes used the same gurdwara.

According to H. S. Bhatti, the Green Revolution had major impacts on the social dynamics of caste in Punjab. The scheduled caste Sikhs generally did not support the Punjabi Suba movement, as they feared living under greater Jat domination in the proposed Punjabi-speaking, Sikh-majority state. Therefore, they voted for opposition parties, such as the Indian National Congress, rather than the Akali Dal.

In modern Sikhism, new caste-identifying labels, such as Dalit-Sikh, Ravidassia-Sikh, and Valmiki-Sikh, have arisen to describe Sikhs of low-caste backgrounds. In-conjunction, members of the Jat-Sikh, Saini-Sikh, and Ramgarhia-Sikh, also publicly describes themselves as such by highli In the 1980s, using the former Ad-Dharmi movement as historical precedence, the separatist Ravidassia movement arose. Ravidasi Deras began to proliferate across the state of Punjab, symbolizing an emerging independent religious identity from the prevailing religions.

The Shiromani Gurdwara Parbandhak Committee's (Sikh body which manages historical gurdwaras) General House has a specified number of seats reserved for scheduled-caste Sikhs. Out of the 170 electable seats, 20 are reserved for members belonging to a SC Sikh background. Post-independent Indian politics has seen lower-caste Sikhs using politics as a means of self-representation whilst upper-castes have used politics to further their dominance. Barring a few examples, all of the chief ministers of the Indian state of Punjab have been from Jat-Sikh backgrounds. Furthermore, most of the political parties in Punjab have a Jat-Sikh leader. The Green Revolution in Punjab and other government-funded agricultural programmes benefited the locally dominant castes, such as the Jats who owned most of the agricultural land. The modernization of agriculture also benefited lower-caste Sikhs, as older and more exploitable agricultural systems tied around dependency and tied-labour revolving around the relationship between landowners and landless labourers gave way for more formalized relationships, which allowed the labourers to push for higher-wages and better working conditions. Nearly all landless labourers come from SC backgrounds. Additionally, the need for more labour led to migrant workers from states like Bihar and Uttar Pradesh to come work the fields of Jat landowners, which freed the indigenous Punjabi lower-castes to diversity into other fields away from agricultural labour. Mechanization and machinery had also made traditional occupations associated with particular lower-castes obsolete in the modern-age. Thus, lower-castes began to seek informal work in villages and towns, moving away from their dependency on the upper-castes and towards greater independence. During the 1990s and 2000s, this increasing independence of lower-caste Sikhs led to the construction of caste-specific gurdwaras in villages. This phenomenon is notable in the Doaba region of Punjab (although it did happen to a lesser-extent in the other Punjabi regions), where Ramdasias and Mazhabis began establishing their own gurdwaras. Ravidasis and Chamars are often officially listed as Hindus but their religious practices are more akin to Sikhs, with their dedicated temples being known as Ravidasi Mandirs, rather than as gurdwaras. The increasing autonomy and power of the lower-castes in Punjab led to increased tensions and competition between them and the upper-castes. Now, lower-castes began to demand their share of resources in villages, which previously had been totally under the control of the historically dominant castes. Furthermore, lower-castes began to demand that their community be represented in the management of places of worship. An example of these tensions playing out in the real-world is the conflict at Talhan village in 2003, where local Dalits pushed for representation in the management body of a samadh dedicated to a local Sikh saint, leading to conflict with the dominant Jats of the village. Eventually, the Dalits of Talhan were successful in obtaining representation at the shrine's management committee, which emboldened other Dalit movement across the state of Punjab.

Despite the Sikh gurus all coming from Khatri-backgrounds, which is classified as a Forward Caste, the upper-caste, urban Khatri Sikhs have not developed to become a dominant Sikh castes, due to their lower population, leading to their disempowerment. Furthermore, a majority of Khatris identify themselves as Hindus rather than as Sikhs. However, the Jats on the other hand make up almost one-third of the total Sikh population, which makes them the largest caste amongst the Sikhs and traditionally the most dominant ruling-elites of the community and region. Sikhism today is characterized by Jat-Sikh hegemony over Sikh religious and political affairs (such as in both the SGPC and SAD organizations), and they hold sway in rural areas due to them being the largest group of landowners.

The rise of the Bhangra genre of Punjabi music has reinforced the connection of Jat-Sikhs to rural Punjab and ancestral villages (pinds) through the creation of a sense of nostalgia, this is despite the fact that many Jats today are urbanized. This is an example of positive identification for Jat-Sikh youth by creating an in-group and a sense of indigenousness, with both being tied to their caste-identity. Takhar cautions against labelling such a phenomenon as being discriminatory against other castes.

Nowadays, with changes brought-on by the Green Revolution, industralization, and increased education, caste-groups which formerly worked as agricultural labourers have since shifted to other occupations and now much agricultural labour is carried-out by outside migrants from Uttar Pradesh and Bihar. Meanwhile, well-to-do Jats are shifting from agriculture to transportation and industry. Lower-castes of Punjab are shifting from agricultural-based work to government jobs, marking a growing class of educated lower castes. Thus, traditional caste-based distinctions are gradually eroding as a new middle-class emerges, rural-origin youth shift their dwelling, and outward migration of Punjabis continues whilst inward migration of settlers from other states into Punjab continues. Khatri gotras, such as Bedi, Sodhi, Trehan, Bhalla, Bawa, and Uppal, are assuming a more Hindu-shifted identity.

== Sikh diaspora ==
Amongst the Sikh diaspora, some groups have broken away from mainstream Sikhism due to discrimination against Dalit Sikhs and have increasingly adopted separate identities, such as with the Ravidassias (also known as Ravidasi). However, this is argued as not only being a religiously motivated move but also a political one. In the 1960s and 1970s, many diasporic gurdwaras were established based around caste-identities, such as the Shri Guru Ravidass Dharmik Sabha Wolverhampton (founded by members of the Ad-Dharmi/Ravidassia movement). The Dalit and Ravidassia Sikhs started establishing their own gurdwaras due to the discrimination they faced at "mainstream" Sikh gurdwaras, which were controlled by non-Dalit Sikhs. A recent-trend is that places of worship of the Ravidassia and Valmiki communities are referred to as Sabhas and Bhawans instead of gurdwaras, which is a recent move toward separating from mainstream Sikhism. In addition, some Ravidassia-affiliated places of worship have removed the primary Sikh scripture, the Guru Granth Sahib, from their premises and replaced it with a new scripture called Amritbani Guru Ravidass. However, there are also gurdwaras established around caste-identities, such as by Ramgarhia and Bhatra Sikhs, which still affiliate themselves with mainstream Sikhism.

In the UK, a proposed bill to criminalize caste-based discrimination faced some backlash from Sikh groups who saw it as unnecessary in the country, such as Sikh Council UK (SCUK). British-Sikhs who opposed the legislation instead preferred using education as a means to combat casteism rather than laws, as laws could entrench casteism into legal code, comparing to the Indian legal system's handling of caste, which although well-intentioned had long-term effects. The SCUK claimed that caste-discrimination in Britain was coming to an end amongst British-Sikhs, especially the youth, and demanded that a sunset clause be inserted into the legislation. According to the 2013 British Sikh Report, 61.2% of the 662 British-Sikhs who participated said that they do not care about caste-related issues. Despite that, caste remains an important aspect of marriage, through the practice of endogamy. Dalit-Sikhs have claimed they have faced discrimination at the hands of Jat-Sikhs.

== Caste-based surnames ==
Sikhs believe that Guru Gobind Singh mandated in 1699 that they adopt Singh and Kaur as part of their names to manifest gender equality and to shed influences of casteism and classism. All five members of the inaugural Panj Piare quintet are held to have replaced their previous surnames for Singh during this event. In India, a person's hereditary or familial occupation or background can often be determined by their family name and often signifies the caste-background of the person. The name Singh long pre-dates Sikhism's adoption of it and was used by warrior-groups in India in the form of a Kshatriya title, such as by Rajputs. Thus, Jacob Copeman argues that the adoption of Singh as a title by the Sikhs does not mark a move solely toward castelessness but rather it was more aptly an action toward Rajputization. The adoption of Singh and Kaur also imbued "name spirit" into Dalit Sikhs, an uplifting effect as it opened up a formerly Rajput title to be adopted by lower-castes. All Sikhs sharing the same name also symbolizes them belonging to the same family.

For the Sikhs that have a family name, it usually consists of a caste-based or sub-caste-based name which marks the individual's caste identity. Sikhism opposes the caste system, thus traditionally Sikhs did not have caste-based surnames, however they have been adopted by some Sikhs to match with naming conventions outside of India. For the Sikhs who do not have a caste-based surname, some use Singh or Kaur as their surname instead. Other Sikhs have a placename (toponym) as their surname rather than a caste-based surname.

According to Gian Singh Sandhu, a naming convention that was adopted by Sikhs during the colonial-period was the introduction of surnames based upon one's caste or clan, which Jacob Copeman describes as being a bureaucratic and institutional-motivated process. Prior to this, Sikhs traditionally did not put a clan or caste-affiliated name in their actual name as a surname. During the colonial-period, the British colonial administration institutionalized and fixed the surnames of its Indian subjects for the purposes of demographic records (censuses), criminal records, tax records, voting records, and immunization and health records. However, the colonial administration complained that Indian surnames were "too recurrent", which contributed to a "native propensity for impersonation". The British Indian censuses were not referential but rather generative in-actuality. Thus, this is viewed as a reversal of shedding caste from one's identity with the introduction of caste and clan names into Sikh names, which according to Jacob Copeman has led some orthodox Sikh reformers and laymen West Delhiite Sikhs to worry about the resurgence of casteism and decline of equality in the community.} Copeman argues that the rise of the installation of caste and clan names into Sikh proper names is not due to a desire for indicating one's caste nor due to a resurgence of caste mentalities but rather as a byproduct of the policies of government agencies (such as passport and visa agencies) or schools, as all Sikhs having only Singh or Kaur in their name does not allow government departments to be able to effectively disambiguate and differentiate between individuals within the Sikh community as effectively, as everyone shares the same names. Thus, the adoption of caste-based surnames amongst Sikhs is for the purpose of solving a bureaucratic problem, not due to caste-motivated feelings. Sikh religious bodies, realizing the bureaucratic problem, instead advocates that Sikhs should adopt toponyms (place names) as surnames rather than caste-names.

In the pre-partition period, Sikhs living in rural areas especially did not have their caste or sub-caste (got or gotra) as part of their name, as all the landowning families inhabiting the same village tended to belong to the same sub-caste, thus there was no point in including this information as part of one's official name. People generally knew the sub-caste of members of their community as this was used to determine feasible marriage partners, one's lineage, religion, occupation, place of origin, social status, and caste (zaat).

In 2007, Canadian immigration authorities stated that they refused to accept Kaur or Singh as surnames for the past ten years, demanding that Indian immigrant applicants with those surnames to change their last name because they were "too common". This policy was reversed in 2007 but it unknown how many applicants were effected by this request and changed their surnames due to it, which may have led to the increase of caste-based surnames. Indian passport and visa authorities have also requested those with Singh or Kaur as their surname to adopt another last name for disambiguation purposes.

Many Sikhs append the name of their sub-caste (known as a got in Punjabi and gotra in Hindi) as their surname. A got is an exogamous grouping within a particular caste (known as a zat in Punjabi and jati in Hindi). A zat is an endogamous caste grouping, which contains gots under it. Some Sikhs are against the usage of got names as surnames because they think it promotes the caste system and the discrimination that comes from it, which is against Sikh doctrines. Other Sikhs defend the usage of caste surnames by claiming it is a critical aspect of cultural identity. Sikhs tend to marry someone belonging to a different got as themself whilst belonging to the same zat. Since the second half of the 20th century, some Sikhs from socially and economically disadvantaged castes have adopted the gotra names of privileged castes as their surnames in an attempt to hide their original caste-background and seek upward social mobility. An example of this practice in-action is a trend of Mazhabis adopting Jat Sikh clan names as their surname in an attempt to seek higher social statues by affiliating themselves with Jats. Atheists from Sikh-backgrounds may prefer to use a caste-name instead of Singh or Kaur as the latter is too affiliated to the Sikh religion. Some Dalit Sikh activists have criticized the practice of Singh or Kaur in-place of caste-based names as an example of "caste-blindness", which they feel is "obsolete" and "discredited", preferring the practice of "conspicuous caste". Some orthodox Sikh schools, such as the Singh Sabha schools of Delhi, do not recognize or record any caste-related surnames of their pupils, instead recording their surname solely as Singh or Kaur to replace any caste-based surnames. Consequently, the class register of these schools differentiated students sharing the same name with numeric values rather than by the student's caste surname.

Many members of heterodoxical sects and splinter movements of Sikhism, such as the Ravidassias, may have either Hindu-adjacent ("Devi" or "Lal") or Sikh-adjacent last names ("Singh" or "Kaur"). Many followers of the aforementioned groups are from the Dalit community, particularly a sub-group known as Ramdasias. Whilst many Ravidassias practice having Singh or Kaur in their names, a lot of those who do assert their identity of being a Ravidassia and not a Sikh.

== Scholarly views ==
Surinder Jodhka states that the existence of caste in the respective religious communities of non-Hindus in the subcontinent is seen as "evidence" of their Hindu ancestry, which means that their ancestors originally converted out of Hinduism (such as with Indian Muslims or Christians) or their religious traditions were merely branches that emerged from Hinduism (such as with Sikhs, Buddhists, and Jains). This kind of conceptialization creates an image of a historical India that was once united as a single civilization, whose base principles were recorded in the Manusmiriti. However, the imagination of a single, unified Indian civilizational entity emerged in the British colonial-period, specifically with European orientalists coordinating with Brahmins, which the Britishers later used to further their theories on Indian matters. Later, Indian nationalists co-opted the narrative of a single Indian nation for their movement, advocating the India's diversity in language, religion, and region were derivatives of a single Hindu ethos.

However, historical and critical scholarship has positioned that taking a singular view on India's past, also in-regards to caste, is unreliable. For example, there existed non-Brahminical and Sramanic traditions that flourished alongside Brahminical Hinduism, with traditions like Buddhism being opposed to the varna hierarchals scheme which existed. Recent scholarship in post-independent India have shown that the lived-realities of caste were varied based on region, and influenced by that region's history, power-dynamics, and economy. Thus, in-contrast to notions of the Indian caste-system being "immutable" and "singular", the caste system amongst Punjabi Sikhs has been influenced by Punjabi and Sikh history and culture and its manifestation varies based on local sub-regions, with a difference also being evidence when contrasting both urban and rural-settings. Jodhka believes that the caste system in India would be better understood using "comparative conceptual frames such as 'ethnic closure'". Jodhka concludes by stating that Sikh religious teachings can be used as a means for lessening inequal hierarchies, institutionalized humiliation, and violence in the world.

== See also ==
- Caste system among South Asian Muslims
- Caste system among South Asian Christians
- Jain communities
- Buddhism and caste
- Sadh
- Satnampanth
- Baradari (brotherhood)
- Qawm
