= Kahuta Tehsil =

Administrative subdivision Tehsil of Punjab, Pakistan

- Tehsil
- Country: Pakistan
- Region: Punjab
- District: Rawalpindi District
- Capital: Kahuta
- Towns: 1
- Union councils: 13

Area
  - Tehsil: 637 km^{2} (246 sq mi)

Population (2023)
  - Tehsil: 237,843
  - Density: 373/km^{2} (967/sq mi)
  - Urban: ...
  - Rural: ...

Literacy (2023)
  - Literacy rate: 84.05%
- Time zone: UTC+5 (PST)

Kahuta Tehsil (Punjabi, Urdu تحصیل کہوٹا) is one of the seven tehsils (subdivisions) of Rawalpindi District in the Punjab province of Pakistan.

The neighbouring tehsil of Kallar Sayedan used to be part of Kahuta, but was later created as a separate tehsil in 2004.

The name Kahuta is derived from "Koh", a local medicinal tree (Look the leaves as Oliven), and "Boota".

== History ==
In 997 CE, Sultan Mahmud Ghaznavi, took over the Ghaznavid dynasty empire established by his father, Sultan Sebuktegin, In 1005 he conquered the Shahis in Kabul in 1005, and followed it by the conquests of Punjab region. The Delhi Sultanate and later Mughal Empire ruled the region. The Punjab region became predominantly Muslim due to missionary Sufi saints whose dargahs dot the landscape of Punjab region.

After the decline of the Mughal Empire, the Sikh Empire invaded and occupied Rawalpindi District. The local Muslims faced restrictions and oppression during the Sikh rule in the area. In 1849, the area was then conquered by the British after the Second Anglo-Sikh War. During the period of British rule, Kahuta Tehsil increased in population and importance.

In the year 1849, Kahuta along with much of the South Asia became part of British India, the undivided tehsil (which includes what is now Kallar Syedan Tehsil) is described in the "Imperial Gazetteer of India" as follows:

The predominantly Muslim population of the area supported the Muslim League and Pakistan Movement. After the independence of Pakistan from British rule in 1947, the minority Hindus and Sikhs faced attacks and massacres by the Muslims so they migrated to India.

== Administration ==
The tehsil is administratively divided into 13 Union Councils, two of which form the city of Kahuta; these are:

UC34	Names of UC's	
Uc-30	Narar	It's a village famous for Panj-Peer Rocks.
Uc-31	Punjar	
Uc-32	Khadiot	
Uc-33	Doberan	
Uc-34	Mowara	
Uc-35	Beor	
Uc-36	Matore	
Uc-37	Nara	
Uc-38	Dakhali	
Uc-39	Hothla	
Uc-47	Kahuta	
Uc-116	Khalol	
Uc-117	Lehri	

== Demography ==
=== Population ===
Historical population
Year	Pop.	±% p.a.
1951	...	—
1961	...	—
1972	...	—
1981	...	—
1998	...	—
2017	220,576	—
2023	237,843	+1.26%

The population of the Kahuta Tehsil is approximately 237,843 according to the latest census of Pakistan which was held in 2023.

The tribes living in Kahuta include the Janjua Rajput, Qureshi [Sons of Bahudin of Multan [Arab dependents]]Shaikhs, Awans, Dhund Abbasi, Jasgam Abbasi, Sudhan, Syed, Satti, Gakhar, Gujjar, Khattar, Qazi, Janhal, Mughal, Chauhan, Siddiqui and Dhanyal.

== See also ==
- Demography of Rawalpindi District
