= Demographics of Rawalpindi District =

The demographics of Rawalpindi District, a district of Punjab in Pakistan, has undergone significant changes over the years. It has been affected by turmoil in the surrounding districts.

== 1901 census ==
The 1901 census was carried out during the period of British rule. The population of the district in 1901 was 558,699, and the area of the district at the time was 6,192 square kilometres.

The major Hindu tribes of Rawalpindi district were Brahmins (particularly Mohyals) and Khatris.

The major Muslim tribes of Rawalpindi District were the Janjua Rajput, Chauhan, Awans, Abbasi, Dhanyals, Gakhars, Gujjars, Jats, Kashmiris, Khattar, Paracha, Satti, khokhars, Pathans, and Sayyid.

According to the census of 1901, the population of the main tribes were: Rajputs (101,000) or 21% of the total population, Awan (38,768), Janjua Rajputs(27,557),Dhund Abbasi (23,462), Gakhars Rajputs (13,328), Gujjars (25,953), Bhatti Jats (34,556), Khattar (1,014). Miscellaneous Dhanyal Rajputs (3,991), Satti (5,343) and Sayyid (12,508) were also present.

Religious groups in Rawalpindi District (1901 British Punjab Province Census)
Religious group	1901	
Religious group	Pop.	%
Islam	803,283	86.32%
Hinduism	86,269	9.27%
Sikhism	32,234	3.46%
Christianity	7,614	0.82%
Jainism	1,068	0.11%
Zoroastrianism	66	0.01%
Judaism	1	0%
Buddhism	0	0%
Others	0	0%
Total population	930,535	100%
Note1: British Punjab province era district borders are not an exact match in the present-day due to various bifurcations to district borders — which since created new districts — throughout the historic Punjab Province region during the post-independence era that have taken into account population increases. Population decrease between 1901 and 1911 census due to creation of Attock district in 1904 by taking Talagang Tehsil from Jhelum District and Pindi Gheb, Fateh Jang and Attock Tehsils from Rawalpindi District.

== 1911 census ==
Religious groups in Rawalpindi District (1911 British Punjab Province Census)
Religious group	1911	
Religious group	Pop.	%
Islam	458,101	83.62%
Hinduism	48,449	8.84%
Sikhism	31,839	5.81%
Christianity	8,320	1.52%
Jainism	1,028	0.19%
Zoroastrianism	64	0.01%
Judaism	16	0%
Buddhism	10	0%
Others	0	0%
Total population	547,827	100%
Note1: British Punjab province era district borders are not an exact match in the present-day due to various bifurcations to district borders — which since created new districts — throughout the historic Punjab Province region during the post-independence era that have taken into account population increases. Population decrease between 1901 and 1911 census due to creation of Attock district in 1904 by taking Talagang Tehsil from Jhelum District and Pindi Gheb, Fateh Jang and Attock Tehsils from Rawalpindi District.

== 1941 census ==
Religion of Rawalpindi District in 1941
1. Muslims (80.0%)
2. Hindus (10.5%)
3. Sikhs (8.17%)
4. Christians (0.54%)
5. Others (0.79%)

According to the 1941 Indian census Muslims numbered around 628,913, at 80% of the total population, while Hindus and Sikhs numbered 82,178 (10.50%) and 64,127 (8.17%) respectively.

Religion in Rawalpindi District
Religion	Population (1941)	Percentage (1941)
Islam	628,193	80%
Hinduism (Note: Including Ad-Dharmis)	82,478	10.5%
Sikh	64,127	8.17%
Christianity	4,212	0.54%
Others (Note: Including Jainism, Buddhism, Zoroastrianism, Judaism, or not stated)	6,221	0.79%
Total Population	785,231	100%

== After independence ==
The predominantly Muslim population supported the Muslim League and Pakistan Movement.

After the independence of Pakistan in 1947, the minority Hindus and Sikhs migrated to India while the Muslim refugees from India settled in the Rawalpindi District. Kashmir and other areas arrived in Rawalpindi.

While it is accepted that the population of urban Rawalpindi has been transformed since independence, the rural population in the Kahuta, Kallar Syedan, Kotli Sattian, Gujar Khan and Murree Tehsils are still overwhelmingly populated by the tribes referred to in the 1901 census.

== 1998 census ==
According to the 1998 census the population of the district was 3,363,911 of which 53.03% were urban.

At the time of the 1998 census of Pakistan, the following were the demographics of the Rawalpindi district, by first language:

- Punjabi: 90%
- Urdu: 3.5%
- Pashto: 4.3%
- Others: approx. 2.2%

== 2017 census ==
In the 2017 census the population of the district was 5,405,633 of which 54.% were urban, making Rawalpindi the second most urbanised district in Punjab.

Also at the time of the 2017 Census of Pakistan, the distribution of the population of Rawalpindi District by first language was as follows:

- 68.7% Punjabi
- 10.9% Pashto
- 10.2% Urdu
- 3.2% Hindko
- 1.8% Kashmiri
- 1.0% Saraiki
- 0.2% Sindhi
- 0.1% Brahui
- 0.1% Balochi
- 4.0% Others

== See also ==
- Tribes and clans of the Pothohar Plateau
