= Bhoun, Rawalpindi =

Village in Punjab, Pakistan

Bhoun
- Village
- Country: Pakistan
- Province: Punjab
- District: Rawalpindi
- Tehsil: Kahuta
- Time zone: PST
- Calling code: 051

Bhoun (Urdu: بھون) is a town in Kahuta Tehsil of Rawalpindi District, Punjab, Pakistan. Bhoun is situated 14 kilometers away and East from Kahuta. The town has a population of 4,500 (approximately).

Clean drinking water is not available since water supply lines are not within reach of the town. Instead, residents have wells in their homes. Community wells are also available.

One primary school is available in the town and most children and young people travel to other areas for education. The town's literacy rate is improving.

The area has traditionally relied upon agriculture for employment due to local fertile soil. Wheat and corn crops were planted and produced in large amounts. The local major source of occupation is no longer farming, following technical education initiatives which have resulted in locals working in increasing numbers for the government and private organisations.
