= Panjpeer Rocks =

Cliff in Pakistan

Panjpeer Rocks (Balcony of Pakistan)
- Cliffs
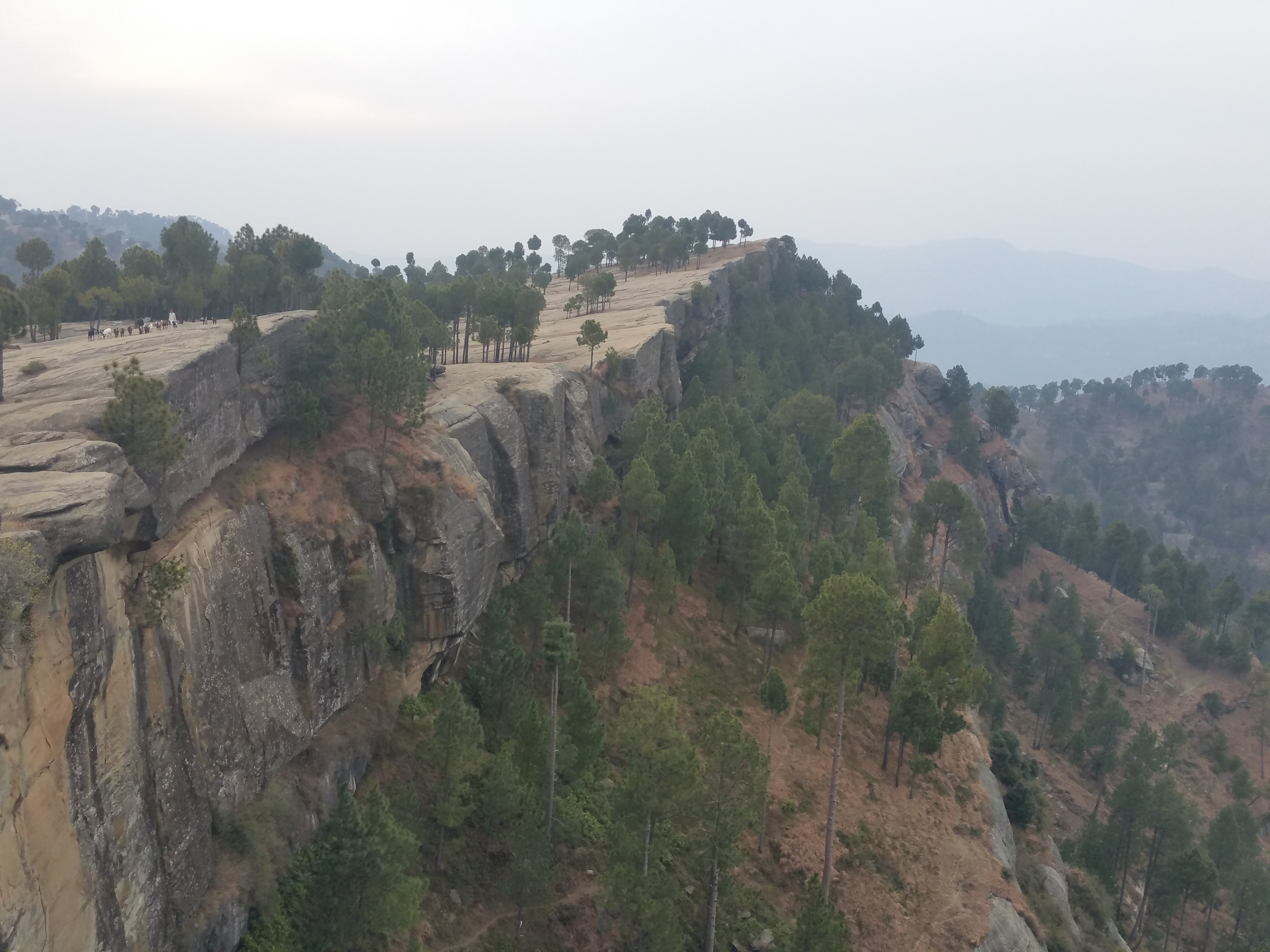
- Panjpeer Rocks Cliff Side

- Location within Pakistan
- Coordinates: 33°43′59″N 73°31′56″E
- Location: Rawalpindi District, Pakistan
- Elevation: 1,800 m (5,900 ft)

Panjpeer Rocks also called as "Balcony of Pakistan" is a cliff in Pakistan. It is located in Union Council Narar of Tehsil Kahuta, about 70 km (2 hours drive) away from the capital Islamabad. It is approximately 6100 feet above the sea level. Adjacent places include, Noorabad Waterfall, Khoiyan Waterfall, Panjar, Kotli Sattian, and Sore village that includes Manjan Lake and Sore waterfall.

.
