= Dhandla =

- Jāti: Rajput
- Religions: Islam
- Languages: Punjabi
- Country: Pakistan
- Region: Punjab
- Ethnicity: Punjabi
- Family names: yes

Dhandla is a Punjabi Muslim clan and surname, originating from the Bhatti Rajputs.

Notable people with the surname Dhandla include:

- Muhammad Afzal Khan Dhandla
- Muhammad Zafar Ullah Khan Dhandla
