= Beor =

Beor may refer to:

- Beor (biblical figure), father of the prophet Balaam
- Beor (village), a village in Punjab, Pakistan
- Henry Beor (1846–1880), politician in colonial Queensland, Australia

== See also ==
- Boer (surname)
