= Wahla =

Wahla is a Punjabi surname and caste found in the Pakistani Punjab.

Notable people with surname Wahla include:

- Karam Dad Wahla
- Fazaldad Wahla
- Zeeshan Wahla, Canadian politician
