= Shakrial =

Pakistani neighbourhood

Coordinates: 33°38′N 73°06′E

- Urban Area
- Location within Pakistan
- Country: Pakistan
- Province: Punjab (Pakistan)
- District: Rawalpindi
- Time zone: UTC+5 (PST)

Shakrial is a town in Rawalpindi District, Pakistan. It is linked in the east to Kuri Road and the area of Dhoke Kashmirian, in the west to Chirah Road, in the north to Service Road and the area of Sadiqabad, and in the south to Expressway Islamabad.

The town is divided into two main parts, Old Shakrial and New Shakrial. The native people of Shakrial are Qureshis, and other major clans are Syeds, Hanjra Rajputs, Maliks, Mughals khans and Sattis. Every year in the summer season, people gather in the town for Urs of Saein Boota Darbar.

== Education ==
The town has basic educational facilities, but no higher education colleges or universities. The nearest high school is Government Comprehensive High School and Government Hashmat Ali Islamia College in the Dhoke Kashmirian Area.
