= Darzi =

Muslim community, found in North India and Pakistan

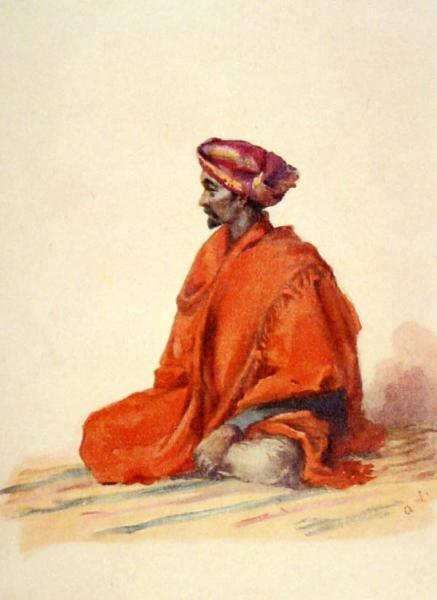

Regions with significant populations
- • India • Pakistan (Indian subcontinent)

Languages
- • Hindi • Gujrati • Urdu • Punjabi

Religion
- • Hinduism • Islam

Related ethnic groups
- • Indians • Shaikh

Darzi are a caste among both Hindus and Muslims. Darzi are known as Idrisi in the Muslim community.

"Tailoring" is the English translation of Darzi. In the Indian tradition, it was customary to wrap clothing over the body rather than wear stitched clothes. Used in Hindi and Urdu, the word Darzi comes from the Persian language.

== History and origin ==
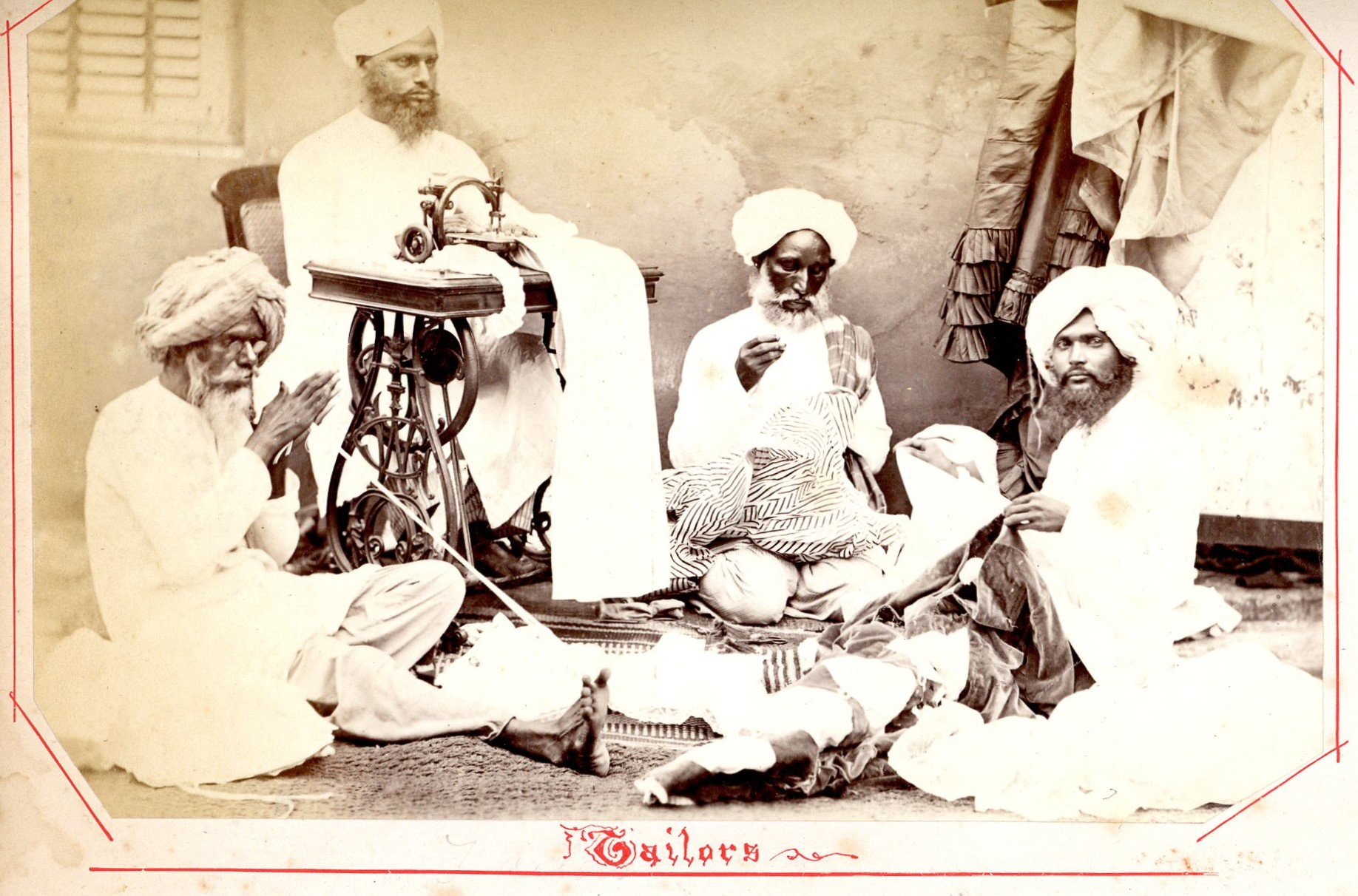
Photograph of tailors at-work, India, albumen print on card, ca.1870's–'80's

The word Darzi (दर्ज़ी درزی) literally means "business of tailor" in Hindi and Urdu. The Darzis adopted the name Idrisi from Idris (Enoch), a Biblical and Koranic prophet. According to their traditions, Idris was the first person to learn the art of sewing. It is said to be derived from the Persian word darzan, which means "to sew". This is also the commonly accepted derivation of the name of the non-related religion Druze. The Darzi are said to have settled in South Asia during the early period of the Sultanate of Delhi. They are also divided on a linguistic basis, with those of North India speaking various dialects of Urdu, while those of Punjab speaking Punjabi.

== In India ==
=== Hindu Darzi ===
The Hindu Darzi have various synonyms as well as legends about their community origins. The legends vary according to the Indian states in which they reside.

In the desert state of Rajasthan, the Darzi trace their descent from their legendary hero Shri Peepa Ji Maharaj, who later became saint during the Bhakti movement in India, who was the Great Spiritual Scholar of Swami Ramanada. Swami Ramananda was a 14th century Vaishnava devotional poet and saint who lived in the Gangetic basin of Northern India. Over time, people from this community shifted from their originating place to their place of work to the other cities, and can be found all over India.

=== Muslim Darzi ===
The Punjabi Darzi is said to have converted to Islam from the Hindu Chhimba caste, and have several territorial divisions. These include the Sirhindi, Deswal and Multani. The Punjabi Darzi (Chhimba Darzi) are almost entirely Sunni.

The Idrisi of Jharkhand have a common origin with those of Bihar, and intermarry. The community speak the Angika dialect of Hindi. Most Idrisis are still engaged in tailoring, but many Idrisis, particularly in Jharkhand, are now farmers. Their customs are similar to other Bihari Muslims.

== In Pakistan ==
In Punjab, the Punjabi Darzi are migrants from East Punjab. Many in rural areas of Punjab have taken to cultivation, while those in urban areas have opened up small businesses. The Punjabi Darzi claim to belong to the Muslim Rajput community. They are entirely Sunni, and many belong to the orthodox Deobandi sect.

== See also ==
- The Druze heterodox Muslim community of Syria also derived their name from the word Darzi.
