= Buddhism and caste =

Buddhism arose in the Indian subcontinent in the 5th century BC, when the predominant religion in the region was Brahmanism, a predecessor of modern-day Hinduism. Hinduism supported a religiously and socially motivated caste system, which continues to play a significant role in the society of India today. Due to differing metaphysical and ethical doctrines, Buddhist attitudes towards caste have historically diverged from and rejected those of casteism in several ways.

Buddhism is integrated into the Newar caste system among the Newar people of Nepal, just north of India.

There has been much debate about the extent to which Buddhism has been ideologically opposed to the caste system in India. The teachings of the Buddha have been described as fundamentally anti-caste. However, there is also evidence of complacency towards caste discrimination in early Buddhist literature, and it is unclear whether members of "untouchable" castes were treated as having the same potential for enlightenment as others.

== Background ==
The Hindu caste system is structured around two key concepts through which members of society are categorized, varṇa (वर्ण) and jāti (जाति). Jati refers to countless endogamous groups defined by occupation, social status, shared ancestry, and locality, while varna divides society into a hierarchy of (usually four) broad social classes. The social hierarchy between jati is determined by their relationship to the more general hierarchy of varnas. From least to most privileged, the traditional varnas and their associated occupational classes are Shudras (manual laborers), Vaishyas (Farmers, landlords, Merchants), Kshatriyas (warriors and rulers), and Brahmins (the priestly class).

As with jati, varnas are linked to occupation, endogamy, and inherited status. However, varna is also related to Hindu religion and myth, and concepts of relative spiritual purity. The myth of Manu describes the four varnas originating from different parts of the body of the original man. Unlike the European system of the estates of the realm, varna was also defined by ritual purity. It was believed that ritual impurity could be transmitted to a member of a higher varna by direct or indirect contact with a member of a lower one. According to some traditions, all varnas but shudra could claim dvija status, admitting the study of religious texts. It was also thought that the soul could move between varnas between rebirths, but that a person was stuck within their birth caste for life. Those who were not counted as members of any varna (avarṇa) were either so-called "tribal" or Adivasi people, or untouchable Dalits given the most stigmatized work in the community. Though negative caste-based discrimination has been illegal in India since 1948, it still has serious effects in parts of the country.

== Discussion of caste in Buddhist sources ==
Buddhist sources contain discussion of the origins and nature of the Indian caste system, as well as some arguments against caste discrimination in both religious and everyday contexts. Hindu and Buddhist scriptures are both preoccupied by the four-varna system, while the distinctions between jati have held more importance in recent history. Further, the caste system was scarcely as pervasive or consistent in the Indian subcontinent as it is idealised to be in scriptural sources, due to varied geography, cultural differences between regions, and changing conditions throughout history. In as much as Buddhist sources have less ideological investment in the caste system than Brahmanical sources, they may provide historians with a less exaggerated account of the role of caste in the economy and society of ancient India. Many Buddhist texts suggest that ancient Indian society was effectively operating on much vaguer distinction between "high" (ukkaṭṭha) and "low" (hīna) occupations, as opposed to an idealised varna system. Furthermore, Buddhist scriptures deny superiority based on birth, but accept the four classes as an inevitable part of society. In contrast to Hindu sources, the warrior usually comes before the brahmin.

=== Social as opposed to intrinsic determination of caste ===
A key difference from the Brahmanical understanding of caste has been observed in early Buddhist literature relating to the Buddhist distinction between the real and the nominal. Two early Buddhist texts, the Kalpadrumāvadānamālā and the Śārdūlakarṇāvadāna refer to enforced social distinctions such as the four varnas as sañjñā(māntra), lit. '(mere) nominal designations'. In general, early Buddhist philosophical sources conclude that caste distinctions are mainly imperceptible, and only the result of social conventions, determining nothing about the inner essence of the people they refer to. The Śārdūlakarṇāvadāna illustrates the nominality of the four varnas using the following allegory:

Just as sand does not become food simply because a child says so when young children playing on a main road build sand pies and give them names, saying “This one is milk, this one is meat, and this one is curd,” so it is with the four classes [varṇās], as you, the Brahmin, describe them.

While Buddhist philosophy tends to deny the four varnas any inherent reality, the social processes behind their development are considered in some texts. For example, the Aggañña Sutta describes the first Kshatriya arising from a primordial, unstratified society due to the need for the community to enact punishment (daṇḍa) against the original crime of theft. It describes the origin of the other three varnas through similar myths focussed on human drama.

In the Vasala Sutta of the Sutta Nipāta, the Buddha is on his alms round and encounters a Brahmin, who calls him an outcaste (vasalaka) and demands that he does not enter his home. The Buddha responds by reprimanding the Brahmin's understanding of caste and redefining vasala and brāhmaṇa respectively in terms of bad and good Buddhist conduct. He concludes that "not by birth is one an outcast; not by birth is one a brahman. By deed one becomes an outcast, by deed one becomes an brahman." The idea that Brahminhood is determined by actions rather than birth appears frequently in Buddhist literature. Though this position rejects the typical birth-based caste hierarchy in favour of a deed-based view of social status, it does not strictly deny the validity of caste distinctions. Its purpose may simply be to defend the central role of action (karma) in determining one's status, in line with Buddhist doctrine, rather than to advocate for a radical egalitarian restructuring of caste society.

== Caste and Buddhist practice ==
=== Varna in the saṅgha ===
In the Divyāvadāna, the Buddhist king Asoka is questioned by one of his ministers for "bow[ing] down to renunciants who come from all castes." The king responds that "at the time of a wedding, a marriage, one [rightly] considers caste, but not at the time of teaching the Dharma. For the causes of the practice of the Teaching are good qualities; good qualities do not pay attention to caste." This is both a denial of the relevance of caste after ordination into the sangha, and an affirmation of its validity in the social affair of marriage. The same position is repeated in the Mahāprajñāpāramitopadeśa. In practice, the majority of the early Sangha came from the upper Brahmin and Kshyatriya castes.

== The Buddha's own caste ==
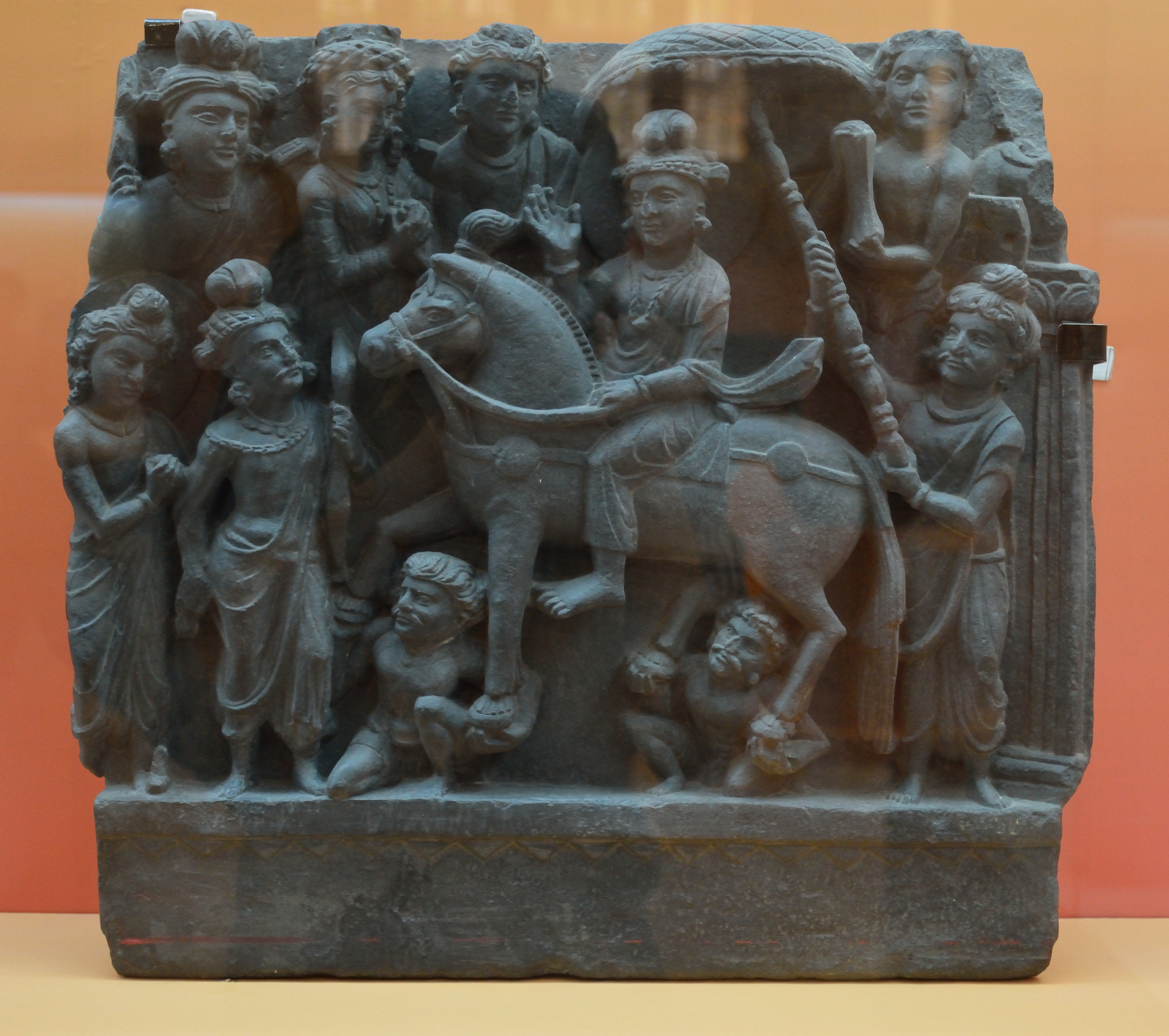
Prince Siddhārtha leaving the palace on a horse during the Great Renunciation.

The Buddha was born as Prince Siddhārtha into the Khattiya warrior caste of the Sakaya clan. However, the Sakaya clan existed on the northern periphery of India, and they did not uphold the four-varna system common elsewhere in India, instead dividing society into and aristocratic caste of khattiya, and a slave caste of suddas. Other scholars have stated that the Buddha did not follow the four fold Aryan Caste System for it was not part of his ethnic heritage.

== Buddhism and untouchability outside of India ==
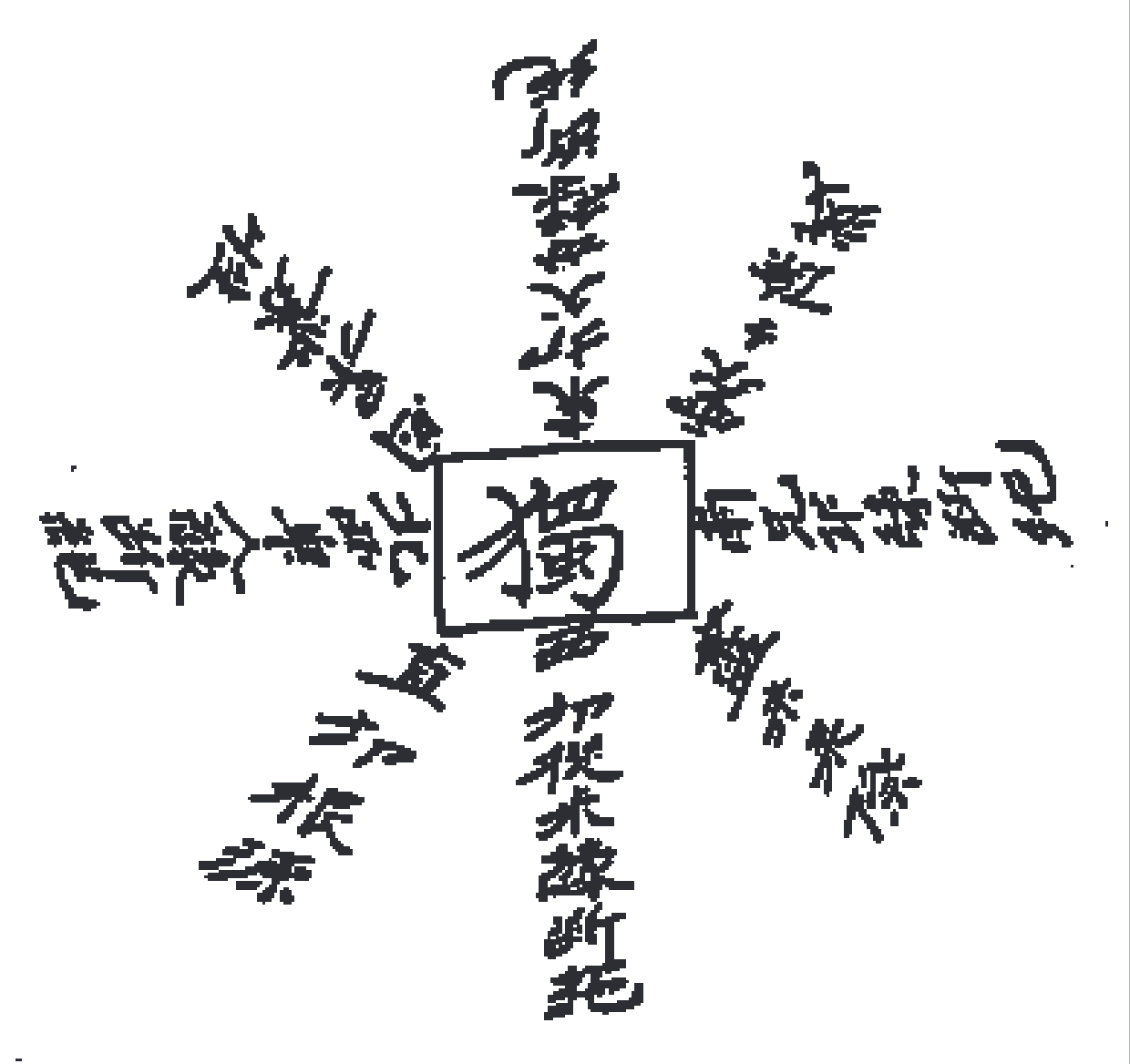
Example of a talisman used in Sōtō Zen on the corpse and home of a deceased Buraku for "negating relations to parents, family, and other humans in all directions," as part of rites meant to sever karmic links to the community, who might otherwise be haunted for mistreating them.

Far beyond the range of Hindu practice and the caste system of India, Buddhism eventually spread into east Asian regions including China, Korea, and Japan. Each of these regions has its own indigenous religions with which Buddhism iteracted. Some of these interactions relate to non-Indian forms of untouchability.

=== Japan ===
In Japan, the predominant religion of Shintoism emphasised a system of ritual purity and defilement. Though in India, Buddhism presented a form of rejection of Hindu ideas of irremediable defilement, Buddhist doctrines had different effects in the Japanese context. Various acts prohibited as immoral in Buddhism, particularly involving the slaughter of animals and consumption of meat, combined with pre-existing Shinto ideas, leading to a set of occupations being labelled as defiled or untouchable. This began with occupations relating to handling dirt and animal and human corpses, but spread to encompass a few other menial tasks including basket and sandal making. The people who performed these occupations became a segregated untouchable caste within Japanese society. This group of people were originally referred to as the eta (穢多, lit. 'greatly defiled'). An additional class of occupations that were considered outside social norms, including travelling actors, prostitutes, and beggars, later formed a second outcaste group called the hinin (非人 lit. 'inhuman'). The specific membership of these groups has not been constant throughout history, but a generalised untouchable group called the Burakumin (部落民, lit. 'hamlet people') was enforced during the Tokugawa period, discrimination relating to Buraku status continues to be an issue in present-day Japan.

== Newar caste system ==
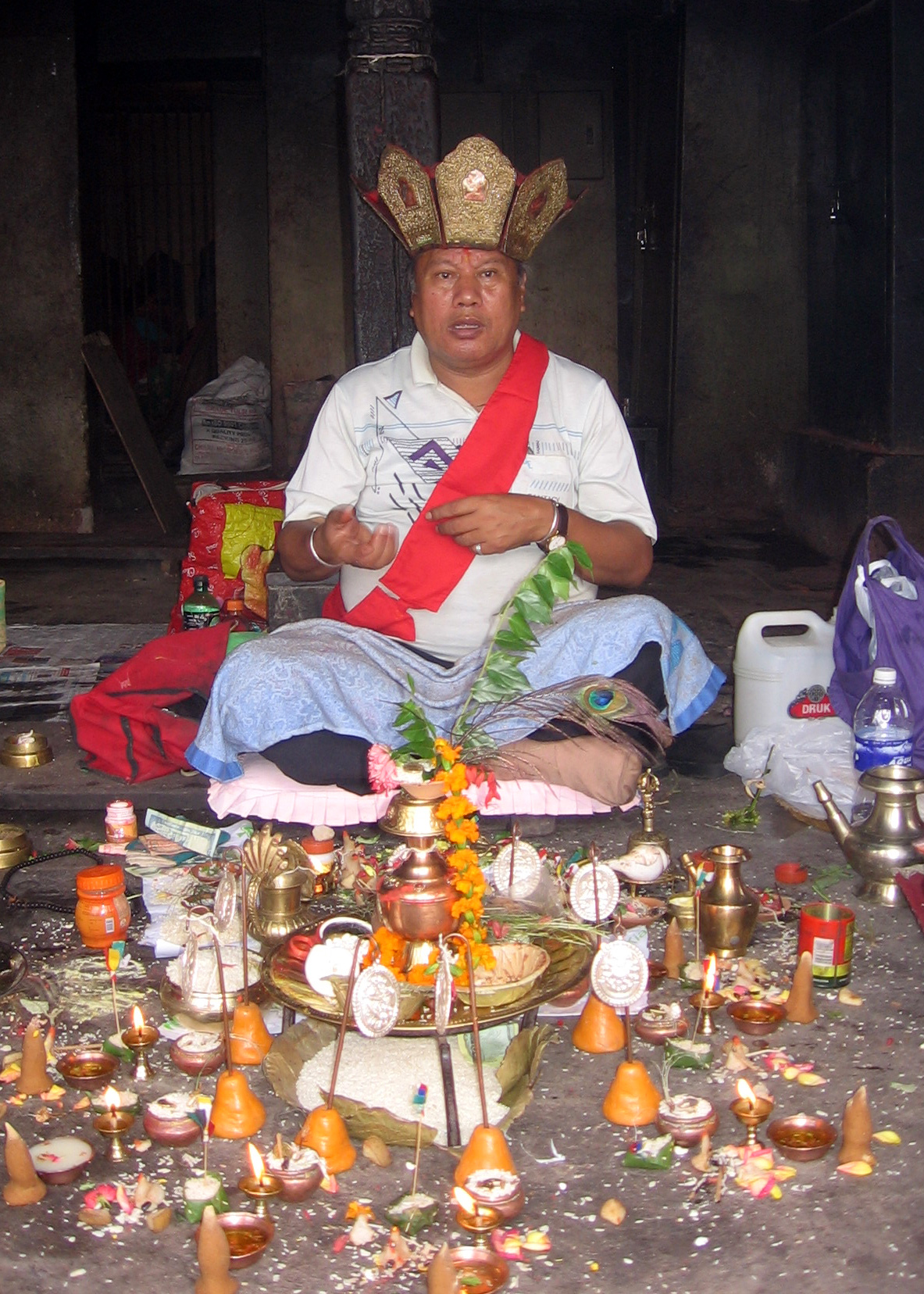
A Newar Buddhist priest of the Vajracharya caste

Among the Newar people of Nepal, Newar Buddhists are a minority, representing 10.74% of the Newar population in 2011, compared to majority of Newar Hindus, representing 87.38%. Despite this, the Newar caste system inteleves separate castes for Hindus and Buddhists, spanning all levels of the social hierarchy.

The existence and influence of Buddhist "ex-monks" from ancient times in the Kathmandu Valley added a "double-headed" element to the Newar caste system. While Rājopādhyāya Brahmins (or Déva-bhāju) occupied the highest social position in the Hindu side, the Vajracharya (or Guru/Gu-bhāju) formed the head among the Buddhists. For Hindu Newars, Brahmans had formal precedence with Kshatriyas, which included the royal family and the various groups now known as Srēṣṭha who ran the administration of the Malla courts. For Buddhist Newars, the non-celibate (gr̥hastha) priestly sangha class Vajracharyas and Shakyas (who are collectively called "Bañdā" or "Baré") were provided with the highest position. In Kathmandu, they were followed by a lay patron Buddhist caste of Urāy, or Upasakas, who specialized in the trade with Tibet. Therefore, the Hindu Rajopadhyaya Brahmins and Buddhist Vajracharyas occupy the highest position in Newar society. This is followed by the Hindu Kshatriya nobility (Chatharīya Srēṣṭha) and the Vaishya merchant and traders castes. The Newar varna logic as stratified from the Hindu Brahmanic perspective place Shakya-Baré, Urāy among the Buddhists, and Pāncthariya Srēṣṭha, and other groups above the Jyapus among the Hindus among the dwija twice-born status as the core Vaishya castes of Newars who are highly specialized in trade and commerce.
