= Khagga =

The Khagga (کھگہ) is a Punjabi tribe and surname from south-west Punjab, Pakistan. They mainly speak Punjabi.

== People with surname Khagga ==
- Ahmad Shah Khagga
- Peer Khizer Hayat Shah Khagga
