= Rath tribe =

Group of Rajasthani pastoralists

Rath
Regions with significant populations
- India; Pakistan

Languages
- Hindi; Marwari; Punjabi; Urdu

Religion
- Islam (majority); Hinduism

Related ethnic groups
- Rajputs; Ranghars; Jats

The Rath (or Rathis) are a group of pastoralist clans found primarily in Rajasthan. They maintained their lifestyle into the 1950s. They are often contrasted with the Pachhada clans, who were forcibly settled into the Punjab Canal Colonies.

The majority of the Rath clans identify as Muslim Rajputs (or Ranghars). Historically, the Johiyas were the most prominent clan.

== Etymology ==
Rath means "ruthless", referencing the violent raids of the Rath clans.

There is a Jat clan known as the Rathi, although it is unclear if there is any relation to the other Rath clans.

== History ==
The Rath maintained their pastoralist lifestyle, raising cattle and occasionally raiding nearby villages until the 1950s. They are contrasted with the Pachhadas, who were forcibly settled into canal colonies.

Historically, the Rath were a community of pastoral nomads, breeding mainly cows and sheep, as well as cultivating dry crops, and migrating three to nine months of the year. Till about the 1950s, no recognized rights to the land existed. This was in marked contrast to the related Pachhada community, who were found in Hissar and Mahendargarh districts of Haryana, who was forced to settle down by the British authorities in the late 19th century. With the construction of the Indira Gandhi Canal, land was divided up, and a large number granted to settlers. This led to a drastic reduction in the grazing area, and process that has led to the abandoning of the nomadic lifestyle. The community are now only partially nomadic, with some members taking the cattle and sheep to their grazing areas, while the majority remaining in the village.

== See also ==
- Pachhada
