= Dakhali =

Coordinates: 33°32′N 73°22′E

Dakhali is a village in Kahuta Tehsil in the Punjab province of Pakistan.

KIT College Kahuta also situated in area of Dakhali
