= Nara, Rawalpindi =

Nara
- Union council
- Interactive map of Nara
- Coordinates: 33°31′51″N 73°28′41″E
- Country: Pakistan
- District: Rawalpindi
- Tehsil: Kahuta

Government
  - chairman: Chaudhary Muhammad Younus
  - Vice chairman: Khan Zaheer Khan

Nara is located in Rawalpindi District, Tehsil Kahuta and province Punjab, Pakistan which is 74 km far from capital towards east.

== Nara ==
=== Noticeable aspects of Nara ===
It is center of five union councils. It is commercial area to its suburbs. Government has constructed a separate school for girls and for boys here. In 2014 the boy school building at Nara Chowk was reconstructed. Nara possesses a library, post office and many commercial center within itself. Mostly villages are touch to Nara in which, Khateel Hoon, Bahgoon, Barsala, Baryah, Kalyah, Khalol, Byor, Jnatal, Lehri, Salgran, Band, Bahrothi, Plahi Mohra, Nori Morah, Makhi Choha, Kund, Hatli, Sweri, Dokh Muglaan, and some other village are belong to Nara city for their daily requirements.

=== History ===
According to the elder nara was mostly inhabited by Sikhs before independence of Pakistan and the last remaining building named Lakhi Chobara might be a proof of that. Lakhi Chobara belonged to Chaudhri Lakhmi Das Johar, who moved to Jagadhri and Ambala after the partition. His brother was Ravel Chand Johar, whose house was rented by the local post office nearby. Ravel Chand moved to Kanpur after partition, where he retired as the Postmaster. The descendants of the family continue to live in New Delhi. Before the partition, Muslims and Sikhs all lived a harmonious life in the village.

=== Language ===
Nara natives speak Pothwari.

=== Culture ===
The majority of people in the Nara Matore region are Muslims. Caste is still considered important there, which is the principal reason that Nara Matore has remained impoverished.

=== Transportation ===
The basic source of transportation within the village are via taxis and personal bike while the settlers have to choose a public transport for going outside the village.

=== Source Of Earnings ===
Nara people are connected with employment outside the city, some have their own businesses, the rest are engaged in agriculture and Majorities are settled in foreign Countries.

=== Famous Schools Of Nara ===
Govt. High Secondary School and PaK Science Academy Nara (Private).
