= Chhimba =

Caste community and Sikh clan of India

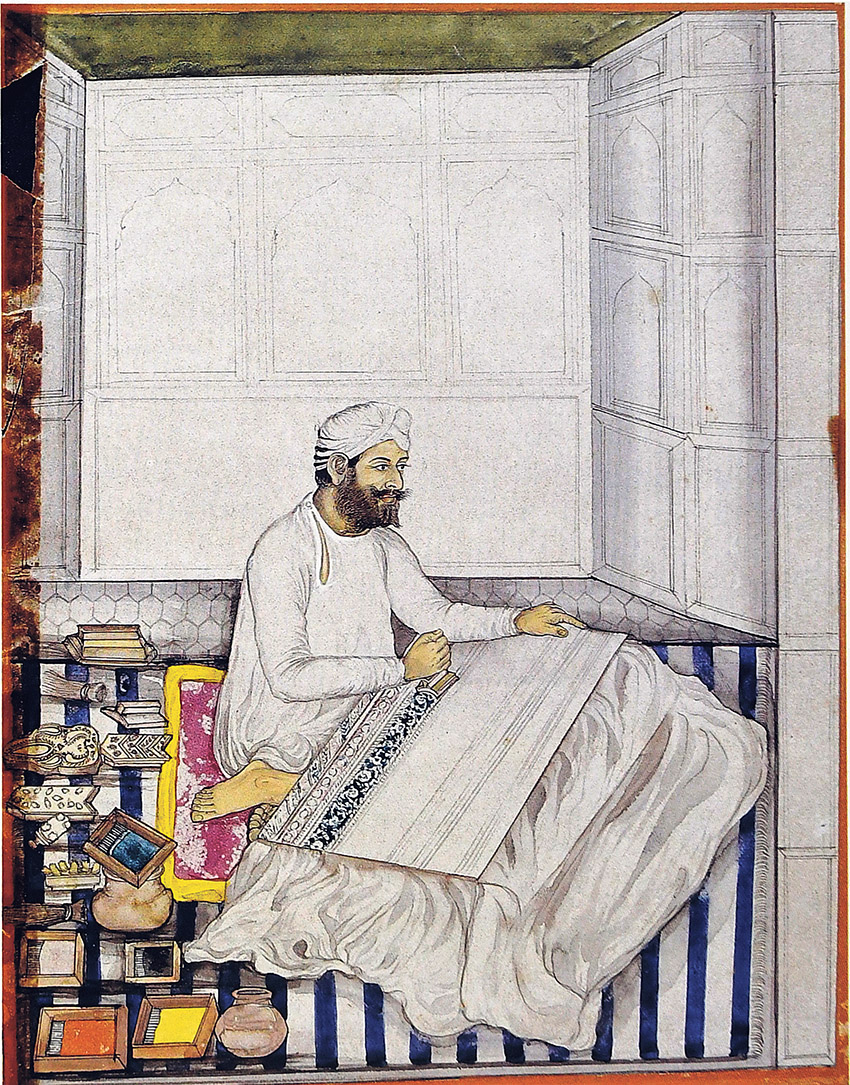
Painting of a Chhimba block-printer, ca.1875

Chhimba (also spelled Chimba, Chhimbe, Chimba, or Chippa) are variously described as a Sikh caste, community or clan of India. They were traditionally associated with dyeing, tailoring, or block-printing work. Alternative terms in Punjab for the community are Chhipa Chhapegir or Chhipi. According to the National Commission for Backward Classes, Chhimba is a synonym of Chhipi, Chimpa, and Chiba. They are included in the Central List of Other Backward Classes for the Union Territory of Chandigarh.

Their traditional occupation in the Samba district of India was dying and hand-printing calico fabric. It was probably some of these people who moved to areas of Himachal Pradesh, where they created a somewhat different style of printing cloth that was much favoured by the Gaddi people of the region.

== Notable Chhimba Sikhs ==
- Mohkam Singh
- Kavi Santokh Singh

== See also ==
- Muslim Chhipi
