= Peer Khizer Hayat Shah Khagga =

Pakistani politician

Member of the Provincial Assembly of the Punjab
- In office 15 August 2018 – 14 January 2023
- Constituency: PP-196 Sahiwal-I
- In office October 2011 – 31 May 2018

Personal details
- Born: 11 October 1984 (age 42) Sahiwal, Punjab, Pakistan
- Party: PMLN

Peer Khizer Hayat Shah Khagga is a Pakistani politician who was a Member of the Provincial Assembly of the Punjab, from October 2011 to May 2018 and from August 2018 to January 2023.

== Early life and education ==
He was born on 11 October 1984 in Sahiwal.

He is son of Ex MPA Pir Wallyat Shah, he graduated in Commerce in 2006 from University of the Punjab. He has the degree of Master of Business Administration.

== Political career ==
He was elected to the Provincial Assembly of the Punjab as a candidate of Pakistan Muslim League (N) (PML-N) from Constituency PP-220 (Sahiwal-I) in by-polls held in October 2011. He received 39,989 votes and defeated Muzaffar Shah Khagga, a joint candidate of Pakistan Muslim League (Q) and Pakistan Peoples Party.

He was re-elected to the Provincial Assembly of the Punjab as a candidate of PML-N from Constituency PP-220 (Sahiwal-I) in the 2013 Pakistani general election.

He was re-elected to Provincial Assembly of the Punjab as a candidate of PML-N from Constituency PP-196 (Sahiwal-I) in the 2018 Pakistani general election.
