= Karam Dad Wahla =

Pakistani politician

Member of the Provincial Assembly of the Punjab
- In office June 2008 – 31 May 2018

Personal details
- Born: 24 March 1968 (age 58) Lahore, Punjab, Pakistan
- Party: IPP (2023-present)

Karam Dad Wahla is a Pakistani politician who was a Member of the Provincial Assembly of the Punjab, from June 2008 to May 2018.

== Early life and education ==
Wahla was born on 24 March 1968 in Lahore. He was the step-brother of Fazaldad Wahla, who served in the National Assembly of Pakistan.

He received his early education from Army Burn Hall College and Aitchison College. He graduated from Forman Christian College in 1989.

== Political career ==
Wahla was elected to the Provincial Assembly of the Punjab as an independent candidate for Constituency PP-219 (Khanewal-VIII) in by-polls held in June 2008. He received 38,098 votes.

He was re-elected to the Provincial Assembly of the Punjab as a candidate for Pakistan Muslim League (N) (PML-N) for Constituency PP-219 (Khanewal-VIII) in the 2013 Pakistani general election.

In April 2018, he announced to quit PML-N.
