= Beor (village) =

Coordinates: 33°35′N 73°34′E

- Village
- Location within Pakistan
- Country: Pakistan
- Province: Punjab, Pakistan
- District: Rawalpindi
- Time zone: UTC+5 (PST)

Beor is a village and union council situated in the Kahuta Tehsil of Rawalpindi District, of Punjab, Pakistan. Its geographical coordinates are 33° 35' 0" North, 73° 34' 0" East.

Most of the population is Muslim, and belongs to the Janhal clan which claims to be Mongols & emperor's origin. Beor is at the centre of a cluster of villages inhabited by the Janhal tribe.

== See also ==
- Kahuta Tehsil
