= Pachhada =

Pakistani ethnic group

The Pachhada are a Muslim ethnic group found in the Pakistani Punjab. They are also known as Rath.

== Origin ==
Their ancestral homeland was the semi-desert territory that now forms part of the Hissar and Mahendragarh districts of Haryana, and the Ganganagar district of Rajasthan. They were a nomadic and pastoral community and are closely related to the Rath community of Rajasthan. The word Pachhada is a corruption of the Punjabi word paschim da or "westerner", as the Pacchada were said to be immigrants from the Neeli Bar and Sandal Bar regions of what is now the Punjab province of Pakistan. However, most of their tribal traditions point to a Rajasthan origin. This was also seen by the fact that none of the Pacchada spoke Punjabi. Instead, they all spoke dialects of Haryana. The Pachhada were among a number of Rajput pastoralist groups found in the Ghaghar valley and north Rajasthan, and were often closely identified with the Ranghar and Bhatti communities, who have similar customs and traditions.

With the establishment of British rule in the early 19th Century, the new authorities took the view that all pastoral nomads in the Ghaghar valley were a threat to their newly established control, and took stringent measures against all the nomad groups of the region such as the Ranghar, Johiya and Bhatti. Land was allocated to peasant settlers, and an attempt was made to forcibly settle the Pachhada. As a result of these policies, the Pacchada played an important role in the attack on Sirsa in the 1857 Indian War of Independence.

After the reestablishment of British colonial authority, the Pacchada were severely punished by British. There were considerable confiscations of land, and the Pachhada were forcibly settled.

By the early 20thcCentury, the Pachhada were settled agriculturists, although animal husbandry remained an important subsidiary occupation. At the time of the partition of India in 1947, the Hissar District fell within the territory of India, and all the Pachhada immigrated to Pakistan.

== Social organization ==
The Pachhada are further divided into four sub-tribes, the Sahu, Sukhera, Hinjraon and Chotia or Bhaneka. Each of these sub-tribes have their own distinct origin myth. All claim descent from well known Rajput clans. Marriages take place within the sub-tribe, and only occasionally with other Pacchada clans. In their new homeland in Pakistani Punjab, mainly in Okara, Sahiwal, Muzaffargarh and Layyah districts, the Pacchada maintain their distinct identity. Many still speak the Haryanvi language. The Pacchada are entirely Sunni, and their customs are similar to other Haryana Muslims settled in Pakistan such as the Ranghar and Meo.

== Sub-tribes ==
=== Sahu ===
The Sahu claim to be by origin Chauhan Rajput, and their villages were found near the town of Bhirana. There are two separate traditions about their origin. According to one of the traditions, the Sahu descend from a Rana Jatu, who left Rawalpindi and settled in Rania and then finally Bhirana. Although he returned to Rawalpindi, he left his son Lal who is the ancestor of the Sahu tribe. While according to other traditions, their ancestor left Jilopatan near Jaipur in Rajasthan, settling initially in Delhi and moved to the Ghaghar valley.

=== Hinjraon/Hanjra ===
Hanjra, Hinjra, Hajrah or hajraw is an important Jatt tribe. The Hinjra of the Gujranwala bar are a pastoral tribe, perhaps of aboriginal extraction. They own 37 villages in Gujranwala which is their home, but have spread both east and west under the hills. They claim to be Saroha Rajputs, and that their ancestor Hinjraon came from the neighbourhood of Hissar to Gujranwala and founded a city called Uskhab, the ruins of which still exist. Their immediate ancestors are Mal and Dhol, and they say that half their clans still live in the Hissar country. It would be interesting to know the names of these clan, and to examine the alleged connection between the two sections of the tribe. In the Hissar Settlement Report it is stated that " the Hinjraon pachada trace their origin to a Saroha Rajput ancestor called Hinjraon. They are all Muhammadans in this district though in other places Hindu Hinjraon Pachhadas are to be found.

According to Panjab Castes Abstract no.74 Hanjra had following population distribution in 1881.

Pakistan
• Rawalpindi District (122)
• Gujrat District (1,170)
• Jhelam District (20)
• Gujranwala District (12,645)
• Sialkot District (2,515)
• Shahpur (Sargodha) District (829)
• Lahore District (1,495)
• Jhang District (482)
• Multan District (64)
• Muzaffargarh District (220)
• Montgomery (Sahiwal) District (600).
Bahawalnagar District( Chak 41) (550)

India
• Amritsar District (2,227)
• Gurdaspur District (366)
• Jalandhar District (2,050)
• Firozpur District (267)
• Total East Plains (58).

=== Other clans ===
In addition to these four clans, the Mahaar, Johiya, Wattoo and Kharal clans lived in close proximity to the Pacchada and there was occasional intermarriage. However, most of these clans were generally referred to as Ranghar, although the Mahaar were sometimes also considered as Pacchada.

== See also ==
- Rath
