= Idrisi Darzi =

Chhimba Darzi
Regions with significant populations
- Pakistan, India

Languages
- • Urdu • Punjabi

Religion
- Islam 100%

Related ethnic groups
- • Darzi • Punjabi Shaikh • muslim rajput •

The Idrisi Darzi are a Muslim community, found in the Punjab region of Pakistan and India. Darzi means tailor in Urdu and Hindi. They have a diaspora in Europe and now work in a range of occupations, their ancestral work was with clothing and hand-printed textiles. In the Indian subcontinent, the people of Idrisi originally come as soldiers from Turkmenistan region of central Asia during the sultanate period.They belonged different clans or tribes of their respective areas.

A significant number of Idrisi Darzi are now found in the city of Manchester in the United Kingdom. In a 2023 survey of Bihar, the Idrisi caste was the seventh most populous Muslim caste, at about 350,000 out of 23 million Muslims (1.6%).

== Notables ==
- Abdul Hamid Indian soldier who received the Param Vir Chakra (posthumously)

== See also ==
- Bhavsar
- Shimpi
- Chhipi
- Muslim Chhipi
- Shaikhs in South Asia
