= Churigar =

Muslim community in India and Pakistan

The Churigar are a Muslim community found in the state of Rajasthan in India and the Punjab province of Pakistan.

== Origin ==
Their name means a manufacturer of bangles, from the Urdu churi bangle and gar maker. The Churigar are found mainly in the districts of Bhilwara, Chittorgarh, Pali, Jodhpur and Udaipur in Rajasthan. Historically, the Churigar were also found in Hissar, Rohtak and Gurgaon in what is now Haryana, as well as in the Pakistani Punjab districts of Gujrat, Sialkot, Mandi Bahauddin and Sargodha. The Churigar were nomadic community, one of the many gypsy-like groups found in Rajasthan and Haryana. By the middle of the 19th century, groups of Churigar had begun to migrate to villages in the Punjab, selling jewellery and bangles. At the time of the partition of India in 1947, almost all of the Churigar in Haryana immigrated to Pakistan.

== Present circumstances ==
=== In Pakistan ===
As nomads, the Punjab Churigar tend to establish regular relations with client communities in villages, and follow specific routes of migration. The basic social unit of the Churigar is the puki or tent in the Punjabi language. All members of the pukki are blood relations, and marriages are held within this group. The Churigar still speak a dialect of Punjabi with many Rajasthani loanwords.

== See also ==
- Manihar
