= Fazaldad Wahla =

Fazaldad Wahla, alias 'Mahmud Khan', or 'Mahmood Khan' (1962–1999) was one of the youngest elected Members of the National Assembly of Pakistan in the country's history. He was elected from Multan from the Pakistan Peoples Party. He was the elder son of Abdul Rehman Wahla.

His step brother Karam Dad Wahla was also a member of provincial assembly.

A US-trained orthodontist by profession, he was killed on September 24, 1999 at his home in Islamabad, Pakistan while attempting to settle a dispute involving a runaway village girl. A young girl ran away from home and her family, who was shamed by this action, attempted to kill the girl. Fazaldad Wahla tried to step in and save her, and was killed by the family.

The Fazaldad Human Rights Institute was set up in his memory to engage in a human rights mass awareness program in Pakistan.

Fazaldad's story gained international popularity after his wife, Uzma Sarfraz-Khan was featured on The Oprah Winfrey Show in 2002.

== See also ==
- Bilquis Sheikh
