= Taseer (caste) =

Tribe in south Asia

The Taseers were a Pastoral-Nomadic tribe of the Gurjar community/clan in Pakistan from around 1800s to 1919-1925. They used to rule over the village of Arang Kel present in Pakistani-administered Azad Kashmir in the disputed Kashmir region. The Kashmiri tribe migrated gradually from Kashmir to Punjab with many other tribes and later ceased to exist as it faced assimilation when they moved to Punjab, where they adopted the local language and customs, eventually losing their distinct cultural identity. Over time, the people of this tribe changed, and today, the Taseer tribe has been reduced to merely a surname, name, or a caste. The reasons behind the migration of these people, the manner in which it occurred, the time period during which it took place, and the identity of their leader remain unclear. Furthermore, questions regarding who established their tribe, when it was formed, and what their distinct identity was still remain unanswered. Since this was a shepherds majority clan/tribe it is said that the tribe used to have three notable brothers (Rozgar Ahmed Taseer, Rozgudaar/Rozdaar Ali Taseer & Raswar Ansar Taseer) who led, controlled and acted as the protectorate of the tribe. These names often lead to a speculation that the tribe could have had a connection with the caste of the Roshandaars. Another legend says, the tribe was created or influenced by the command and remained under the order of a kashmiri Haji Yusuf Saeed who was a Hakeem ( Ḥakīm ) having "Great Shifa" in his procedures/hands later given the honorary title "تعآثيرِ عٓاليٓ" meaning Great influence.
