= Rayeen (Hindu) =

Indian caste

Regions with significant populations
- Haryana • Punjab • Uttar Pradesh

Languages
- Haryanvi • Punjabi • Hindi

Religion
- Hinduism

The Rayeen (or Rai, Rain or Raeen) is a Hindu caste found in the Indian states of Haryana, Punjab and in Western Uttar Pradesh. They use the titles Chaudhary, Rao, Rai and Rana.

== Origin ==
According to their own traditions, the community were originally from Sindh, who were expelled by Umayyad general Muhammad bin Qasim during Muslim conquests on the Indian subcontinent. They also claim a connection with Rai Sahasi II from the Rai dynasty of Sindh (c. 416–644 CE), who was the brother of Rana Maharath/Malhot a Rajput king of Chittor. The community is now found mainly in Haryana, Punjab, Rajasthan and Uttar Pradesh.

== Present circumstances ==
They were and still zamindars and farmers. A few were substantial landowners, with a small minority being landless. They practice animal husbandry as a secondary occupation, and they provide much of the dairy products for the towns in Haryana.
