= Mahtam =

Community in the Punjab region

The Mahtam are a clan found among the Punjabis and Sindhis of India and Pakistan. They practice Hindu, Sikh and Muslim religions.

During British rule in India, they were stigmatised under the 1871 Criminal Tribes Act, which criminalised entire communities by designating them and their members as habitual criminals.
