= Dhanial =

Punjabi tribe in Pakistan

Dhanyal دھنیال
- Ethnicity: Punjabi
- Location: Punjab (Pothohar Plateau)
- Language: Punjabi (mainly Pothwari)
- Religion: Islam

Dhanyal (Punjabi: دھنیال, romanized: Dhanyāl) is a Punjabi tribe and surname originating in the Pothohar Plateau of Punjab, Pakistan.
