= Panjar =

- Location within Pakistan
- Coordinates: 33.39°N 73.31°E
- Country: Pakistan
- Province: Punjab
- Elevation: 795 m (2,608 ft)
- Time zone: UTC+5 (PST)

Panjar is a village/Union Council of Tehsil Kahuta of Rawalpindi District in the Punjab province of Pakistan. It is located at 33°39'0N 73°31'0E with an altitude of 795 metres (2611 feet).
