= Rai Sikh =

Sikh caste

The Rai Sikh is a Sikh community, mainly found in the states of Punjab, Rajasthan, Uttar Pradesh, Uttrakhand, Delhi and Haryana in India.

They came to India after the partition of India from Okara, Pakpattan, Kasur, Minchinabad, Haroonabad, Nankana Sahib, Bahawalnagar, and Sahiwal in the newly created state of Pakistan. Rai Sikhs originated from the banks of the river Ravi from where the caste got its name. They were likely converted to Sikhism from Hinduism and Islam between 1792 and 1815, in the Misl era and early stages of the Sikh Empire. Historically, the majority of the Rai Sikh lived in territory that is now Pakistan, mainly in undivided Sahiwal, and Multan districts, and the erstwhile Bahawalpur state.

In terms of distribution, the Rai Sikh are living mainly in over two hundred villages in Firozpur District and Fazilka district, sixty villages in Kapurthala District, fifty villages in Jalandhar and Ludhiana districts. In neighbouring Haryana, the Rai Sikh are now living in the districts of Karnal, Hisar and Kurukshetra. Almost of all these are refugees from Sheikhupura District in Pakistan.

== History ==
Rai Sikh settlements were found mainly along riverbanks like Ravi River. Following the partition of India in 1947, the Rai Sikhs were allocated the lands of departing Muslim peasants due to their status as refugees from Pakistan.

Their main clans are the Ghogha, Rai, Bawara, Villasra, Rawari, Bhatti, Sanora, Bhichar, Sardia, Chauhan, Saroya, Dandal, Baksawan Seotra, Dilsari, Sarari, Dosa, Sauni, Toor, Jandi, Kachauri, Tonwar, Karnawal, Vanura, Katwal, Wachwala, Khokhar, War, Madha, Malhi, Mandal, Manha, Parbar, Warwal, Kachura, Sawna, Boock, Khera, Tetru, Panwar and Akvan which was better known as Bains in ancient times.

They have a good knowledge of Urdu and Punjabi. Large amount of this society lives in Rajasthan, Uttar Pradesh, Uttrakhand, Delhi, Haryana, Punjab, Madhya Pradesh. The Rai Sikh continue to speak Punjabi which distinguishes them from their neighbours.

The community is now mainly cultivators, with steady immigration to towns and cities, where they have taken up blue and white-collar jobs. Nowadays Rai Sikhs are doctors, engineers, politicians and government employees. Mostly they are farmers and some are traders.

The Rai Sikh have also set own their own caste association, the All India Rai Sikh Welfare Association (Registered), which deals with issues of community welfare as well as a pressure group.

== Lifestyle ==
The community is now mainly cultivators, with steady immigration to towns and cities, where they have taken up blue- and white-collar jobs. Nowadays Rai Sikh Sikhs are Doctors, Engineers, politicians and government employees. Mostly they are farmers and they raise cows and buffaloes for milk.

== Demographics ==
Rai Sikhs in Punjab by Districts (2011)
Districts	2011 India census	
Districts	Rai Sikh Caste Population	%
Amritsar	42,778	1.72%
Barnala	25	0%
Bathinda	3,133	0.23%
Faridkot	142	0.02%
Fatehgarh Sahib	66	0.01%
Firozpur	374,192	18.44%
Gurdaspur	2,307	0.1%
Hoshiarpur	390	0.02%
Jalandhar	19,033	0.87%
Kapurthala	20,685	2.53%
Ludhiana	18,010	0.52%
Mansa	11,353	1.48%
Moga	14,154	1.43%
Sri Muktsar Sahib	6,783	0.75%
Patiala	2,928	0.15%
Rupnagar	8	0%
Sahibzada Ajit Singh Nagar	163	0.02%
Sangrur	119	0.01%
Nawanshahr	99	0.02%
Tarn Taran	327	0.03%
