= Jāti =

Group(s) of people organised as a tribe, community, clan, sub-clan or religious sects

Jāti is the term traditionally used to describe a cohesive group of people in the Indian subcontinent, like a caste, sub-caste, clan, tribe, or a religious sect. Each Jāti typically has an association with an occupation, geography or tribe. Different intrareligious beliefs (e.g. Vaishnavism or Smartism or Shaivism) or linguistic groupings may also define some Jātis. The term is often translated approximately in English as caste.

== Meaning ==
Professor Madhav Gadgil (1999) has described Jātis as goal governing, closed communities, based on his research in rural Maharashtra:

Indian society is even today an agglomeration of numerous castes, tribes and religious communities. The tribal and caste groups are endogamous, reproductively isolated populations traditionally distributed over a restricted geographical range. The different caste populations, unlike tribes, have extensive geographical overlap and members of several castes generally constitute the complex village society.

In such a village society, each caste, traditionally self regulated by a caste council, used to lead a relatively autonomous existence. Each caste used to pursue a hereditarily prescribed occupation; this was particularly true of the artisan and service castes and the pastoral and nomadic castes. The several castes were linked to each other through a traditionally determined barter of services and produce (Ghurye 1961, Karve 1961).

These caste groups retained their identity even after conversion to Islam or Christianity. Each of the caste groups was thus the unit within which cultural and perhaps genetic evolution occurred, at least for the last 1500 years when the system was fully crystallized and probably much longer. Over this period the various castes had come to exhibit striking differences in cultural traits like skills possessed, food habits, dress, language, religious observances as well as in a number of genetic traits.

Under the Jāti system, a person is born into a Jāti with ascribed social roles and endogamy, i.e. marriages take place only within that Jāti. The Jāti provides identity, security and status and has historically been open to change based on economic, social and political influences (a process known as sanskritisation). In the course of Indian history, various economic, political and social factors have led to a continuous closing and churning in the prevailing social ranks which tended to become traditional, hereditary system of social structuring.

This system of thousands of exclusive, endogamous groups, is called Jāti. Though there were minor variations in its manifestation across the breadth of the Indian subcontinent, generally the Jāti was the effective community within which one married and spent most of one's social, religious and cultural life. Often it was the community (Jāti) which provided support in difficult times, in old age and even in the resolution of disputes. It was thus the community which one also sought to promote.

With the passage of the Hindu Marriage Act of 1955, inter-jati and inter-varna marriages (which together constitute what is colloquially referred to as "intercaste marriage") are now legally sanctioned in Hindu-majority India. In practice, however, intercaste marriage remains rare and Indian society remains highly segregated along jati lines.

== Overlap with varnas ==
The British, since 1901, for the purposes of the Decennial Census, fitted all the Jatis into one or the other of the varna categories as described in Brahminical literature. The Census Commissioner had this to say, "The principle suggested as a basis was that of classification by social precedence as recognized by native public opinion at the present day, and manifesting itself in the facts that particular castes are supposed to be the modern representatives of one or other of the castes of the theoretical Hindu system". This deliberately ignored the fact that there are innumerable Jātis that straddled two or more Varnas, based on their occupations. As a community in south India commented, "We are soldiers and saddle makers too" – but it was the enumerators who decided their caste. Since pre-historic times, Indian society had a complex, inter-dependent, and cooperative political economy. One text, the Laws of Manu (c. 200 BC), conceptualized a system of idealized occupational categories (Varna), from the perspective of the Brahmin scholars. Although this scholarly work was unknown to the public during the Islamic period and even before, it gained prominence when the British administrators and Western scholars used it in the late 18th century, to gain an understanding of traditional Hindu law in India and translated it into English.

Crispin Bates noted in 1995 that

In India, anthropologists now more often speak of 'sub-castes' or Jatis, as the building blocks of society [rather than castes]. However, unless there is a strong element of political control or territoriality associated with such groups these too tend to disintegrate upon closer inspection as soon as essentially exogamous practices such as hypergamy are taken into account.

== Self-identity narratives ==
For instance, the Yadavs, a prominent backward class today, believe that "Even in the Vedic age the Yadavs were upholders of the Republican ideals of government. ... The Mahabharata furnishes interesting details regarding the functioning of the republic form of government among the Yadavs. ... It is now an agreed fact that Sri Krishna, the central figure of the epic narratives, tried to defend the republican ideas against the imperialistic movement led by Jarasandha of Magadaha and Kamsa of Mathura" (R. V. K. Yadav, quoted by Lucia Michelutti in "Caste and modern politics in a north Indian town").

Dalits also have "the stories that assert the glory of the caste, identify legendary figures who, the narrators imagine, have played pivotal roles in building their caste identity. The facts of the past are interspersed with myth and fantasy to create a new perception of a past that is glorious, pure and exclusive. This in turn is accorded historical status and imagined to have existed from time immemorial (Seneviratne 1997: 5). This kind of history, which seeks authenticity from written sources and from the self-interpretation of so-called archaeological remains, is sustained by commemorations such as feasts, fasts, celebrations and the creation of new symbols like flags and emblems based on these ..."

== See also ==
- Caste system in India
- Gens
- Gotra
