= Satti =

Punjabi tribe

Satti ستّى
- Ethnicity: Punjabi
- Location: Punjab (Galyat and Pothohar Plateau)
- Language: Punjabi (mainly Pahari)
- Religion: Islam

Satti (Punjabi: ستّى) is a Punjabi tribe found in the Kotli Sattian Tehsil of Murree district; the Kahuta Tehsil of Rawalpindi district; and other adjoining areas of Punjab in Pakistan.
