= Kahuta =

Kahuta کہوٹہ
- City
- Kahuta
- Location of Kahuta Kahuta (Pakistan)
- Coordinates: 33.35°N 73.23°E
- Country: Pakistan
- District: Rawalpindi
- Province: Punjab
- Highest elevation: 1,800 m (5,905 ft)

Population (2023)
  - Total: 75,349
- Time zone: UTC+5 (PKT)
- Postal code: 47330
- Calling code: 051

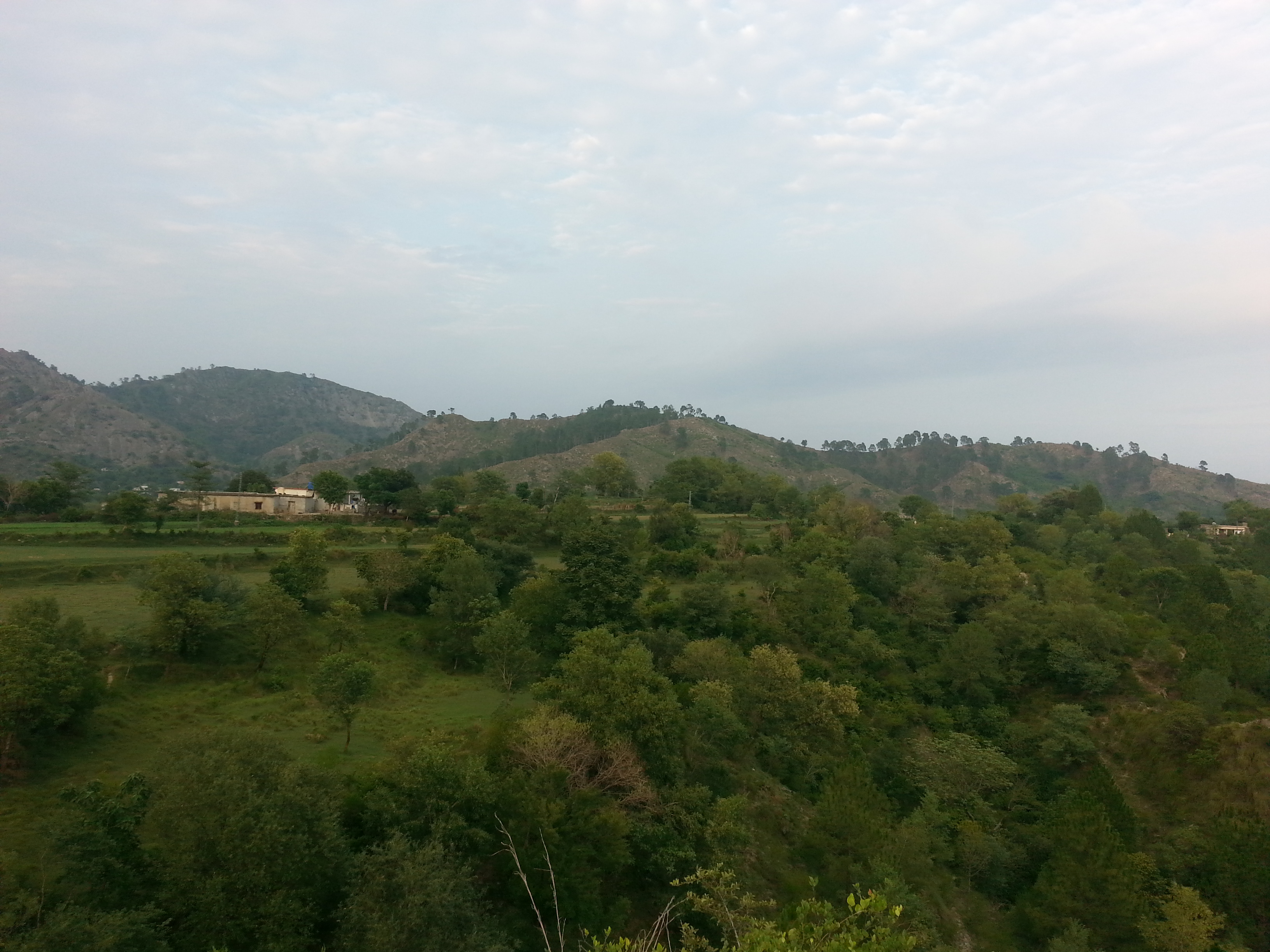
Scenery in Kahuta

Kahuta (Punjabi, Urdu: کہوٹہ) is a census-designated place, city in the Rawalpindi District of Punjab, Pakistan. The population of the Kahuta city is approximately 75,349 at the 2023 census. Kahuta is the home to the Kahuta Research Laboratories (KRL) which was founded to undertake the Kahuta Project as part of the atomic bomb project. Before the Kahuta Project, the site was occupied by retired officers of the Pakistan Army and contained a small public community.

== Etymology ==
The name "Kahuta" was originated from the name of the tree which is extensively found there. The local name of the tree is "koh".

== History ==
Kahuta was a small incorporated city until the 1970s when KRL was constructed by the Pakistan Army Corps of Engineers under Engineering officer Major-General Zahid Ali Akbar, Director of Project-706. During the 1960s and 1970s, Kahuta was inhabited by retired officers of the Pakistan Army.

In the 1970s, the Ministry of Defence was tasked by Prime Minister Zulfikar Ali Bhutto to search for a remote location for carrying out atomic and weapon-testing experiments for the integrated atomic bomb project in 1976. The Uranium Coordination Board (UCB) headed by Ghulam Ishaq Khan financed the reconstruction of the site. Major-General Zahid Ali Akbar and later completed the drawings, surveying and measured the area aerially. Within the week, the whole site was acquired by the Ministry of Defence, and the army truckloads, heavy engineering vehicles arrived the next day to re-build the site. All incoming materials and research equipment were labeled as common items and engineering tools to conceal the true nature of their purpose. Scientists and engineers working and living in Kahuta were censored by the senior military officials. Soon, the site was classified and abandoned with only few allowed to reside. The Engineering Research Laboratories (now KRL) was established by Bhutto as a research government national facility under the Ministry of Defence.

== Geography ==
Kahuta is situated in the Himalayan foothills in Rawalpindi District of Punjab Province, approximately 30 km southeast of Pakistan's capital, Islamabad. The Panjpeer Rocks are located in Kahuta.

== Demographics ==
=== Population ===
Historical population
Year	Pop.	±% p.a.
1998	19,207	—
2017	60,610	+6.23%
2023	75,349	+3.69%

As of the 2023 census, Kahuta city had a population of 75,349.

Languages

Languages of Kahuta city (2023 Census)
1. Punjabi (79.2%)
2. Urdu (6.70%)
3. Pashto (2.90%)
4. Kashmiri (2.40%)
5. Others (8.80%)
