= List of nomadic peoples =

This is a list of nomadic people arranged by economic specialization and region.

Nomadic people are communities who move from one place to another, rather than settling permanently in one location. Many cultures have traditionally been nomadic, but nomadic behavior is increasingly rare in industrialized countries.

== Hunter-gatherers ==
Nomadic hunting and gathering, following seasonally available wild plants and game, is the oldest human method of subsistence.

=== Africa ===
- Hadza people
- Pygmies
  - Twa people
  - Mbuti
- San people

=== Americas ===
- Abenaki
- Aché
- Alaskan Athabaskans
- Aleut
- Alutiiq
- Apache
- Beothuk
- Blackfoot
- Cheyenne
- Chichimeca
- Chiquillanes
- Chitimacha
- Chumash
- Chono
- Clovis culture
- Cody complex
- Comanches
- Crow
- Dalton tradition
- Dene
- Dorset culture
- Eyak
- Folsom culture
- Greenlandic Inuit
- Guarani
- Haida
- Hell Gap complex
- Indigenous peoples of California
- Ingalik
- Innu
- Inuit
- Iñupiat
- Karankawa
- Kawésqar
- Kiowa
- Koyukon
- Lakota
- Makah
- Maritime Archaic
- Menominee
- Métis Nation of Canada
- Navajo (until the sixteenth century with the introduction of sheep, and the adoption of agriculture from the Puebloans)
- Nez Perce
- Norton tradition
- Nukak-Makú
- Ojibwe
- Oshara tradition
- Oxbow complex
- Paiute
- Paleo-Arctic tradition
- Pirahã
- Plains Indians
- Plano culture
- Puelche
- Red Ocher people
- Red Paint People
- Sioux (from around the 17th century onwards, they were previously a farming people who lived in the Ohio River Valley)
- Tehuelche
- Thule people
- Tlingit
- Utes
- Yaghan
- Yahi
- Yanomami
- Yupik

=== Asia ===
- Adivasi
- Aeta
- Ainu
- Altai
- Andamanese
  - Great Andamanese
  - Jarawa
  - Lodha
  - Onge
  - Sabar
  - Sentinelese
  - Shompen
- Ati
- Mongolian
- Batek
- Chukchi
- Denisova hominine
- Dolgans
- Kazakhs (before USSR)
- Kyrgyz (before USSR)
- Ket
- Meenas
- Nganasan
- Nicobarese
- Orang Darat
- Orang Laut
- Penan
- Polahi
- Raute
- Sakai
- Selkup
- Semang
- Siberian Yupik
- Yakuts
- Homo erectus (Paleolithic era)

=== Oceania ===
- Most Indigenous Australians prior to Western contact
  - Spinifex People
  - Aboriginal Tasmanians
  - Tiwi
- Most Papuans prior to Western contact

=== Europe ===
- Cro-Magnon
  - Aurignacian
  - Gravettian
  - Magdalenian
  - Hamburg
  - Solutrean
- Neanderthals (during the Paleolithic)
- Sami (formerly, up until the fifteenth century)

== Pastoralists ==
Pastoralists raise herds, driving them or moving with them, in patterns that normally avoid depleting pastures beyond their ability to recover. The pastoralists are sedentary, remaining within a local area, but moving between permanent spring, summer, autumn and winter (or dry and wet season) pastures for their livestock.

=== Africa ===
- Ababdeh
- Afar
- Bedouin
- Beja
- Berbers
- Borana Oromo
- Dinka
- Fulanis
- Gabra
- Karamojong
- Maasai (originally, now settled or semi-nomadic)
- Mrazig of Tunisia
- Nuer
- Pokot
- Rendille
- Sahrawis
- Samburu
- Somali
- Tigre
- Tuareg
- Toubou
- Trekboer
- Turkana

=== Asia ===
- Some Komi
- Ahir/Yadav
- Altai people
- Baloch
- Balti
- Banjara
- Chukchi
- Dhangar
- Dukha
- Enets
- Evenks
- Evens
- Gaddis
- Gaderia
- Gavli
- Gujjar only in Gilgit Baltistan, Kashmir, and parts of Khyber Pakhtunkhwa
- Gurjar
- Hmong
- Huns
- Jat
- Khanty people
- Kochis
- Koryaks
- Kurumbar
- Maldhari pastoralist groups of Kutch
- Mansi people
- Moken
- Mongols
- Nenets
- Tarkhans
- Tibetans (primarily the Changpa at present)
- Turkic (ancient, medieval age)
- Turkic (present)
  - Xiongnu
  - Yukaghirs
  - Ahir
  - Bafan
  - Bayad
  - Bharwad
  - Bulgars (briefly, between the conquest of the hypothetical Kingdom of Balhara and the formation of Great Bulgaria)
  - Charan
  - Cumans (up until the formation of the country Wallachia/Basarabia)
  - Halaypotra
  - Hingora
  - Karakalpaks
  - Kathi
  - Kazakhs
  - Ker
  - Khakas
  - Khant
  - Khazars
  - Kipchaks
  - Kyrgyz
  - Me
  - Meta Qureshi
  - Mughals (before they invaded and settled the Indian subcontinent in the 16th century)
  - Mutwa
  - Node
  - Nogais
  - Pancholi
  - Avars
  - Paratharia
  - Pechenegs
  - Qashqai
  - Rabari
  - Raysipotra
  - Royma
  - Samma
  - Sandhai Muslims
  - Sanghar
  - Seljuks (during the Middle Ages)
  - Shahsevan
  - Soomra
  - Sorathia
  - Theba
  - Turkmens
  - Tuvans
  - Wagher
  - Warya
  - Yörük
  - some northern Yakuts
  - Shors
  - Soyots
  - Telengits
  - Teleuts
  - Tofalar
  - Tozhu Tuvans
  - Tsaatan
- Wakhi
- In Afghanistan
  - Kuchis (Kochai)
  - Hephthalites
  - Hunas

=== Europe ===
- Hellenic
  - Sarakatsani
- Illyrian
  - Albanians (some tribes, namely katuns)
- Mongolic
  - Kalmyks
- Romance
  - Vaqueiros de alzada
  - Vlachs
- Turkic
  - Nogai people
  - Stavropol Turkmens
  - Bashkirs
  - Kazakhs
- Uralic
  - Magyars (Prior to arrival in Carpathia and until Christianization in the 11th century)

== Peripatetic ==
Peripatetic nomads offer the skills of a craft or trade to the settled populations among whom they travel. They are the most common remaining nomadic peoples in industrialized nations. Most, or all, of the following ethnonyms probably do not correspond to one community; many are locally or regionally used (sometimes as occupational names), others are used only by group members, and still others are used pejoratively only by outsiders. Most peripatetic nomads have traditions that they originate from South Asia. In India there are said to be home of over two hundred such groups. Many peripatetic groups in Iran, Afghanistan and Turkey still speak dialects of Indo-Aryan, such as the Ghorbati.

=== South Asia ===
- In Afghanistan:
  - Kuchi (Kochai)
  - Badyanesin
  - Balatumani
  - Chalu
  - Changar
  - Chighalbf
  - Ghalbelbaf
  - Ghorbat (Qurbat)
  - Herati
  - Jalili
  - Jat
  - Juggi
  - Jola
  - Kouli
  - Kuṭaṭa
  - Lawani
  - Luli Mogat
  - Maskurahi
  - Musalli
  - Nausar
  - Pikraj
  - Qawal
  - Sabzaki
  - Sadu
  - Shadibaz (Shadiwan)
  - Sheikh Mohammadi tribe
  - Noristani
  - Siyahpayak
  - Vangawala (Bangṛiwal/Churifrosh)
- In Bangladesh:
  - Bede
  - Buno
  - Doma
  - Sapuria
- In India:
  - Abdal
  - Aheria
  - Bakho
  - Bansphor
  - Bazigar
  - Bede
  - Boria
  - Changar
  - Deha
  - Dharhi
  - Dharkar
  - Doma
  - Gandhila
  - Habura
  - Heri
  - Hurkiya
  - Kalabaz
  - Kan
  - Kanjar
  - Karwal
  - Kela
  - Mirasi
  - Mirshikar
  - Nat
  - Pamaria
  - Patharkat
  - Perna
  - Qalandar
  - Sansi
  - Sapera Muslims
  - Sapera
  - Sapuria
- In Pakistan:
  - Churigar
  - Doma
  - Kanjar
  - Lori
  - Mirasi
  - Qalandar
- In Sri Lanka:
  - Sri Lankan Telugus

=== Middle East ===
- In Iran:
  - Orak
  - Asheq
  - Challi
  - Changi
  - Chareshmal (Krishmal)
  - Dumi
  - Feuj
  - Ghajar
  - Ghorbati (Ghorbat, Gurbat, Qurbati)
  - Gurani
  - Haddad (Ahangar, Hasanpur)
  - Howihar
  - Juki
  - Karachi
  - Kenchli
  - Kowli (Kuli)
  - Luri
  - Luti
  - Mehtar
  - Ojuli
  - Qarbalband
  - Sazandeh
  - Suzmani
  - Tat
  - Toshmal
- In Iraq:
  - Dom
  - Kowli (Kuli)
  - Zott
- In Syria:
  - Dom
  - Nawar
- In Turkey:
  - Abdal of Turkey
  - Arabci
  - Bosha
  - Çingene
  - Gäwändi
  - Ghorbati
  - Qeraçi
  - Susmani
  - Tahtacı

=== Europe ===
- Romani people
  - Sinti
  - Manush
  - Romanichal
  - Romanisæl
  - Iberian Kale (Gitanos)
  - Finnish Kale
  - Welsh Kale
- Scottish Travellers
- New Age travellers
- Irish Travellers or Pavees
- Indigenous Dutch Travellers or Woonwagenbewoners
- Indigenous Flemish Travellers or Voyageurs
- Indigenous Norwegian Travellers or Reisende/Skøyere/Fantefolk
- Showmen (Funfair Travellers) (Note: Not an ethnic group, but occupational travellers, the members of multi-generational families who own and operate travelling funfairs and circuses, who move around as part of their work.)
- Yenish (German Travellers)
- Mercheros
- Camminanti

=== North America ===
- Irish Travellers
- Romani people
- Carnies
- Gutter punks

== Popular misconceptions ==
=== Manchus, Jurchens and related groups ===
The Manchus are mistaken by some as nomadic people when in fact they were not nomads, but instead were a sedentary agricultural people who lived in fixed villages, farmed crops, practiced hunting and mounted archery.

The Sushen used flint headed wooden arrows, farmed, hunted, and fished, and lived in caves and trees. The cognates Sushen or Jichen (稷真) again appear in the Shan Hai Jing and Book of Wei during the dynastic era referring to Tungusic Mohe tribes of the far northeast. The Mohe enjoyed eating pork, practiced pig farming extensively, and were mainly sedentary, and also used both pig and dog skins for coats. They were predominantly farmers and grew soybean, wheat, millet, and rice, in addition to engaging in hunting.

The Jurchens were sedentary, settled farmers with advanced agriculture. They farmed grain and millet as their cereal crops, grew flax, and raised oxen, pigs, sheep, and horses. Their farming way of life was very different from the pastoral nomadism of the Mongols and the Khitan on the steppes. "At the most", the Jurchen could only be described as "semi-nomadic" while the majority of them were sedentary.

The Manchu way of life (economy) was described as agricultural, farming crops and raising animals on farms. Manchus practiced Slash-and-burn agriculture in the areas north of Shenyang. The Haixi Jurchens were "semi-agricultural, the Jianzhou Jurchens and Maolian (毛怜) Jurchens were sedentary, while hunting and fishing was the way of life of the "Wild Jurchens". Han Chinese society resembled that of the sedentary Jianzhou and Maolian, who were farmers. Hunting, archery on horseback, horsemanship, livestock raising, and sedentary agriculture were all practiced by the Jianzhou Jurchens as part of their culture. In spite of the fact that the Manchus practiced archery on horse back and equestrianism, the Manchu's immediate progenitors practiced sedentary agriculture. Although the Manchus also partook in hunting, they were sedentary. Their primary mode of production was farming while they lived in villages, forts, and towns surrounded by walls. Farming was practiced by their Jurchen Jin predecessors.

“建州毛怜则渤海大氏遗孽，乐住种，善缉纺，饮食服用，皆如华人，自长白山迤南，可拊而治也。" "The (people of) Chien-chou and Mao-lin [YLSL always reads Mao-lien] are the descendants of the family Ta of Po-hai. They love to be sedentary and sow, and they are skilled in spinning and weaving. As for food, clothing and utensils, they are the same as (those used by) the Chinese. (Those living) south of the Ch'ang-pai mountain are apt to be soothed and governed."

— 据魏焕《皇明九边考》卷二《辽东镇边夷考》 Translation from Sino-J̌ürčed relations during the Yung-Lo period, 1403-1424 by Henry Serruys

For political reasons, the Jurchen leader Nurhaci chose variously to emphasize either differences or similarities in lifestyles with other peoples like the Mongols. Nurhaci said to the Mongols that "The languages of the Chinese and Koreans are different, but their clothing and way of life is the same. It is the same with us Manchus (Jušen) and Mongols. Our languages are different, but our clothing and way of life is the same." Later Nurhaci indicated that the bond with the Mongols was not based in any real shared culture. It was for pragmatic reasons of "mutual opportunism", since Nurhaci said to the Mongols: "You Mongols raise livestock, eat meat and wear pelts. My people till the fields and live on grain. We two are not one country and we have different languages."
