= Nomads of India =

Nomadic communities in India

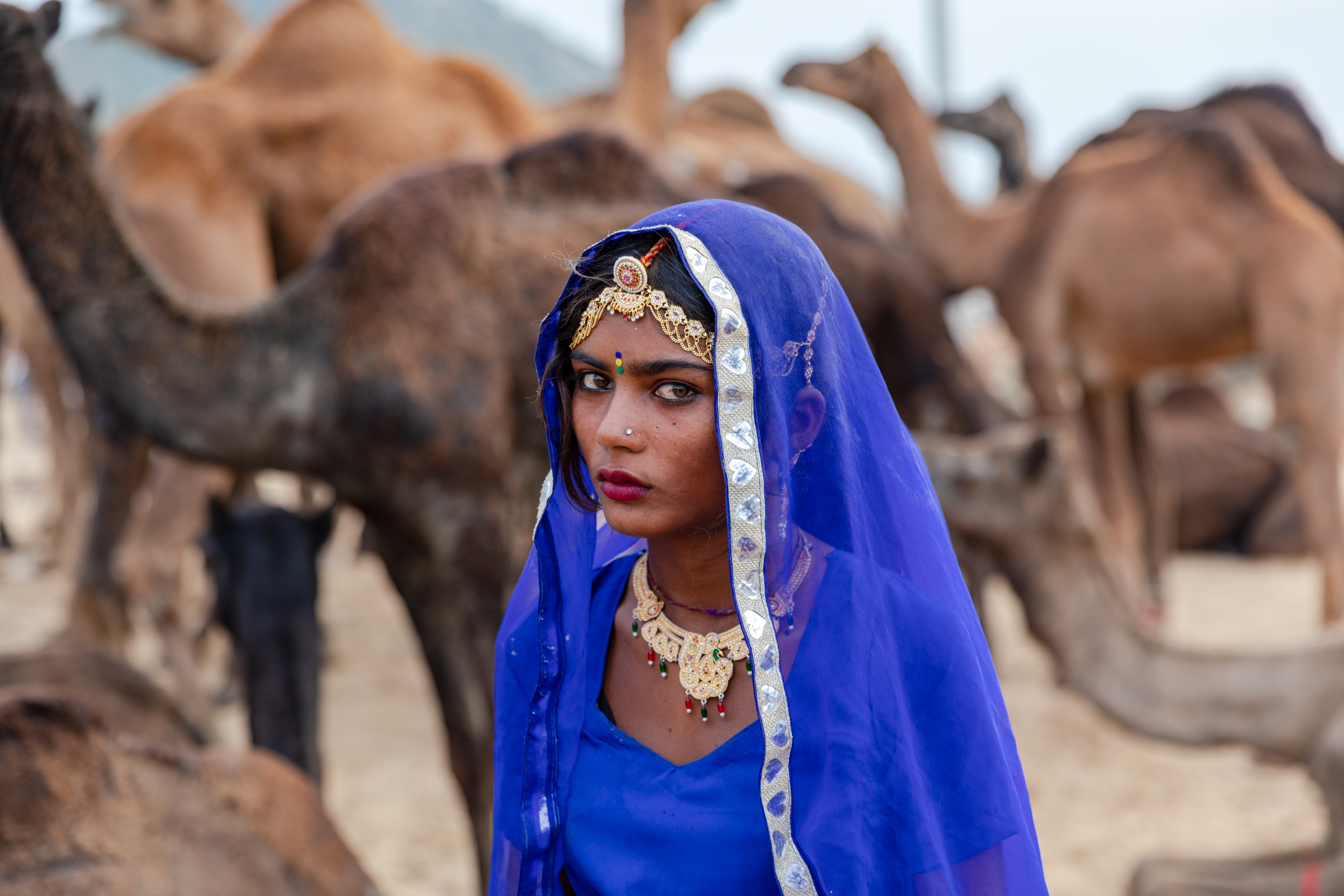
Nomads of Rajasthan, Pushkar Fair

Nomads are known as a group of communities who travel from place to place for their livelihood. Some are salt traders, fortune-tellers, conjurers, ayurvedic healers, jugglers, acrobats, actors, storytellers, snake charmers, animal doctors, tattooists, grindstone makers, or basketmakers. Some anthropologists have identified about 8 nomadic groups in India, numbering perhaps 1 million people—around 0.12 percent of the country's billion-plus population. Aparna Rao and Michael Casimir estimated in 2004 and 2006 respectively, that nomads made up around 7% of the population of India.

The nomadic communities in India can be divided into three groups: hunter-gatherers, pastoralists, and the peripatetic or non-food-producing groups. Among these, peripatetic nomads are a neglected and discriminated-against social group in India. They have lost their livelihood because of drastic changes in transport, industries, production, entertainment, and distribution systems. They find pastures for their herders.

== Historic development ==
Nomadic tribes have been a source of suspicion to sedentary people. In the colonial period, the British normalized a set of notions about such groups that echoed European ideas about the gypsies, whose origins are in the Indian subcontinent. They listed such groups that posed a ‘threat’ to settled society and introduced a legislative measure, the Criminal Tribes Act (CTA) in 1871, and as a result of which nearly 200 such communities stood ‘notified’ as criminal.

The Targalas or Nayaks have been itinerant drama troupes in Gujarat who moved from village to village to perform ‘Bhavai’, a folk dance theatre form. These performers too carry the stigma of criminality. There are numerous folk tales of ‘the skillful thefts’ allegedly committed by Bhavai troupe members. And if a burglary had taken place in a village where Bhavai had been performed, members of the troupe would be arrested and interrogated. The itinerant Bhavai players have been expected to report their entry, stay, and exit to the village headman.

The folk-dance drama of Bhavai probably originated in Kutch, North Gujarat. It then spread over other parts of Gujarat, Saurashtra, Kutch, and Marvad (now Rajasthan). It has been a popular form of entertainment among the rural and townsfolk from the 14th century through to the 19th century in the North-west region of India. Although its origin is in the worship of the Mother Goddess, Bhavani, it has gathered secular elements with the passage of time and come to embrace the whole range of human emotions of the rural community. It is to Gujarat what Yakshagana is to Karnataka, Nautanki to Uttar Pradesh, Tamasha and Lalit to Maharashtra—a veritable folk-dance drama.

The performing Targalas are believed to be the descendants of the poet Asait Thakar of Unjha, who lived in the 14th century. As the legend goes, Asait was an Audichya Brahmin of Unjha in North Gujarat. His host, Hemala Patel's daughter Ganga was kidnapped by a Rawal Ratan Singh, Sardar Jahan Roz. Hemala Patel urged Asait Thakar to use his artistic skills to help liberate his daughter from the Sardar. Asait told the Sardar, after pleasing him with his performance and songs, that he should liberate the girl, who he claimed was his.

Indian are distinguished from other nomads in India in that they breed animals, and this distinguishes them from other groups that make a living by combining with other itinerant professions such as blacksmithing by Gadia Lohar or selling salt by the Lambadi. These pastoral groups are concentrated in certain regions such as the semi-arid and arid Thar desert region and the neighbouring salt marshes of Kutch along the Indo-Pakistan border, as well as the alpine and sub-alpine zones above 3200 metres in the Himalayas, forming the states of Jammu and Kashmir, Himachal Pradesh, and Uttarakhand.

Types of livestock kept in mobile pastoral systems include buffaloes, sheep, goats, camels, cattle, donkeys, and yaks among others. Unlike in the Middle East, where pastoralists are organized in tribes occupying distinct areas, in India pastoralist are integrated in the caste system, representing endogamous social units specialising in animal husbandry.

In western India, in the Kutch region, there is a group of pastoral nomads known as the Maldhari. The word Maldhari means in the local Kutchi language means "owner of animal stock".

List of major pastoral nomadic communities in India
Pastoral Group	State and location	Ethnic Identity	Species
Bakarwal	Jammu and Kashmir		Mainly goats
Bharwad	Gujarat	Gujarati speaking Hindu group	Motabhai raise sheep and goat, and Nanabhai are cattle breeders
Bhotia	Uttarakhand, upper regions of Garhwal and Kumaon	Mainly Hindu, some Buddhist, speak Pahari	Sheep, goats and cattle
Bhutia	North district of Sikkim	Buddhist, speaking Tibetan dialects	Sheep, goats and cattle
Changpa	Jammu and Kashmir, mainly in Zanskar	Buddhist group speaking Ladakhi	Yak
Charan	Gir forest region of Gujarat	Gujarati speaking Hindu group	Cattle
Dhangar	Maharashtra, Karnataka and Madhya Pradesh	Hindu group, speaking Marathi	Sheep
Gaddis	Himachal Pradesh and Jammu and Kashmir	Hindu group, speak Pahari	Sheep and goats
Gaddi Muslim	Bihar, Rajasthan and Uttar Pradesh	Muslim group, speaking various dialects of Hindi	Cattle, are mainly urban dairymen
Gaderia	Uttar Pradesh, Madhya Pradesh and Haryana	Hindu group, speaking dialects of Hindi	Sheep and goats
Gavli	Maharashtra, Goa, Karnataka and Gujarat	Marathi, Konkani Dhangar Hindu sub-group, although some are Muslims	Cattle
Gayri	southern Rajasthan (Mewar)	An endogamous Gaderia Hindu sub-group, speak Rajasthani	Sheep and cattle
Ghosi	Bihar, Rajasthan and Uttar Pradesh	Muslim group	Cattle
Golla also known as Nandiwala	Andhra Pradesh and Maharashtra	Telugu speaking Hindu group	Cattle
Gujjar	Jammu and Kashmir, Himachal Pradesh and Rajasthan	Muslim group in Jammu and Kashmir and Himachal Pradesh, speaking the Gojri language. In Rajasthan, Hindu and speaking Rajasthani	Mainly buffalo, but also cattle generally
Jath	Kutch region of Gujarat	Kutchii speaking Muslim group	Cattle and occasionally camels
Kinnaura	Kinnaur District of Himachal Pradesh	Rajputs or Khasias and Brus, including both Buddhists and Hindu	Sheep and goats
Kuruba	Karnataka	Kannada speaking Hindu group	Sheep
Kuruma	Andhra Pradesh	Telugu speaking Hindu group	Sheep
Mer	in the Saurashtra region of Gujarat	Hindu group, Gujarati speaking	Camels, also some cattle
Monpa	Tawang and West Kemeng districts of Arunachal Pradesh	Buddhist, speaking Tibetan dialects	Yak and cattle
Rath	Western Rajasthan (Ganganagar and Bikaner districts)	Muslim group, speaking dialects of Rajasthani	Cattle mainly of the Rathi breed
Rebari/Raika	Rajasthan and Gujarat	Dialects of Rajasthani	Camel, cattle and goats
Sindhi Sipahi or Sindhi Musalman	Marwar and Jaisalmer	Muslim group, speak Rajasthani	Mainly camels, also cattle and sheep
Toda	In the Nilgiri region of Tamil Nadu, Kerala and Karnataka	Animist group, speak the Toda language	Cattle
Van Gujar	Uttarakhand and Uttar Pradesh	Gojri speaking Muslim group	Buffalo

== Peripatetic nomads ==
Throughout South Asia, there are groups of nomads who are peddlers, itinerant minstrels, dancers and dramatists. These peripatetic nomads do not constitute monolithic groups, but includes numerous groups, often refer to themselves as jatis or quoms.

Tribe or community	traditional occupation	Distribution
Abdal	The Abdal are one of a number of Muslim semi-nomadic community, traditionally associated with begging at shrines of Sufi saints. They are likely to be a division of the Dom community. The word Abdal is the plural form of the Arabic word Abdul, which means slave or follower. In North India, they speak Urdu and local dialects of Hindi and in Gujarat, they speak Gujarati.	in North India, as well as in Gujarat
Aheria	A semi-nomadic group, traditional occupation was hunting and trapping. Many were also involved with acting as guides on royal hunts. Most of the Aheria are Hindus and speak Hindi. However, there are 17 other languages spoken by Aheria people, the most numerous being Harauti which has about 2,000 speakers among the Aheria.	throughout North India
Bakho	The Bakho are a nomadic community, who are a traditionally associated with singing folk songs. They visit their patrons from other castes on special occasions, such as a birth of a child. The community speak Urdu, and are entirely Muslim.	are found mainly in the districts of Begusarai, Patna, Chamoaran and Nalanda, all in Bihar
Bangali	Not be confused with the Bengali ethnic group, they are semi-nomadic tribal grouping, who are said to by origin Sansiya. They are said to have separated from the Sansiya parent group when they took up snake charming, which is their main occupation. A subsidiary occupation is quackery as well as fortune telling. Largely Hindu, with Muslim minority.	in Haryana, Punjab and western Uttar Pradesh
Bansphor, also known as Banbansi	The community get their name from the Hindi words bans, meaning bamboo and phorna which means to split. They are a community that were traditionally involved in the manufacture of bamboo items for household usage. Historically nomadic, most have now settled. According to traditions, they are one of the seven sub-groups of the Dom community. Largely Hindu, with a Muslim minority.	Uttar Pradesh
Basor	The Basor are a sub-division within the Dom community, who were traditionally involved in the manufacture of bamboo furniture. Their name means a worker in bamboo, and their main occupation was the selling of bamboo baskets. Historically nomadic, most Basor are now settled. An important subsidiary occupation is that of the village musicians especially during processions, marriages and other socio-religious ceremonies. They are entirely Hindu and speak Bundelkhandi dialect.	in Uttar Pradesh, mainly in the Bundelkhand region
Bazigar	Nomadic group making a living as jugglers, dancers, basket-weavers and fortune-tellers. The name Bazigar is derived from the Urdu word bazi, which means an acrobat, although they themselves claim to be Chauhan Rajputs. Their primary occupation was the performance of acrobatics. Generally, each family was allocated twelve villages, and the Bazigar were paid by the villagers to entertain them. Many are now daily wage labourer. They speak their own argot known as bazigarboli. Historically, the Bazigar were either Hindu or Muslim, but with the departure of their Muslim patrons, the Bazigar of Punjab have embraced Sikhism.	in Haryana, Punjab and Uttar Pradesh
Bedia, also known as Beria	The word bedia is a corrupt form of the Hindi word behara, which means a forest dweller. They are a nomadic tribe, that had been notified under the Criminal Tribes Act. According to early British scholars, they were one of the many nomadic tribes found in North India, and were of the same stock as the Kanjar. They almost entirely Hindu, although they have a tribal deity known as Narasingh Karde. Those Bedia that are still nomadic often employ Muslim Mirasis to train their girls to sing and dance. The Bedia provide services to certain patron families.	in North India
Boria also known as Baurasi	The Boriya are a sub-group of the Pasi community, and speak the Awadhi dialect . Traditionally nomadic, often employed as village watchmen. Entirely Hindu.	They are found mainly in the Awadh region, mainly in the districts of Gonda, Faizabad and Barabanki districts.
Deha, sometimes pronounced as Dhaya, Dhea, Daiya and Dheya	The Deha were traditionally a nomadic community, that have only recently settled down. Many are now found in encampments at the outskirts of towns and villages. There traditionally occupation was begging and agricultural labour. Although they have their own argot, most Deha also speak Haryanvi. The community is entirely Hindu.	in Haryana and Punjab
Dharhi	The Dharhi are involved with singing and playing the tabla for their patron communities. Their name is a corruption of the Sanskrit word dhrista, which means impudent. Each camp serves a particular area. The Dharhi are Muslims, and speak Awadhi.	mainly in the Awadh region of Uttar Pradesh
Dharkar	The word dharkar comes from the Hindi words dhar meaning rope and kar meaning manufacturer, denoting their occupation which was rope-making and the manufacture of baskets and mats. They also supplement their income by begging. Historically nomadic, selling their wares to the sedentary population. The Dharkar are Hindu and speak Awadhi.	Awadh region of eastern Uttar Pradesh
Dom	Large group of Hindu outcastes, traditionally employed during the cremation rituals . Currently some are sedentary whereas others exist on a nomadic mode of life along with number of other tribal people such as Banjaras and Lambanis. Nomadic Doms in India remain distinct from the local populace in terms of their dress and dialect. Subsidiary occupation includes scavenging, or weaving of ropes and bask Some South Indian Dom earn their living by entertaining as street performers and jugglers. Largely Hindu with a small Muslim minority.	throughout India, also found in Pakistan
Gadia Lohar also known as Gaduliya Lohars	They are lohar (ironsmiths) by profession who move on from one place to another place on bullock carts, which in Hindi are called gadi, hence the name 'Gadia Lohar'. Their camps are often found at the edge of villages, each camp serves a particular region. They are Hindu, and perceive themselves to be of Rajput origin.	mainly in Madhya Pradesh and Rajasthan
Gandhila sometimes pronounced as Gandhil and Gandola	The word Gandhila is said to mean a donkey rarer. Important subsidiary occupations include the manufacture of brooms. They are an iterant community, traditional involved in peddling. In Punjab, the Gandhila speak their own language called Pasto, although most also speak Punjabi	Haryana, Punjab and Uttar Pradesh
Habura	According to some traditions, the word habura has its roots in the Sanskrit hawwa, which means an evil spirit. Their own traditions make reference to the fact that community are descended from Rajput soldiers. They were attempts to forcibly convert them to Islam, and as a result took refuge into the forests. The Habura then took up a nomadic existence, often also engaging in vagrancy. Although most Habura now speak Hindi, they have a particular dialect of their own known as Habura Bhasha. They are entirely Hindu	the central Doab region of Uttar Pradesh.
Heri they are also known as Nayak, Thori and Aheri	The Heri claim to have originated in Rajasthan, and said to have immigrated some four centuries ago. According to traditions, the word Heri is derived from the Rajasthani word her, meaning a herd of cattle. They were still quite recently a nomadic community. The Heri are one of the many Gypsy like groupings found in North India, with their specialist occupation being that they were expert trackers and hunters. They still speak Rajasthani, and are found throughout Haryana. The Heri are entirely Hindu.	in Haryana and Punjab
Hurkiya	In fact, there are two distinct communities that go by the name Hurkiya, those of Uttarakhand, who are Hindu by religion, and those found in western Uttar Pradesh, who are Muslim. Both Hurkiya are of common origin. Traditionally, the Hindu Hurkiya used to entertain their Bhotiya and Khas Rajput clients, with the men playing the hurka drums and the women dancing. While Nat Hurkiya were acrobats and Bhand Hurkiya were jesters. The Muslim Hurkiya are found mainly in Agra, Farrukhabad, and Etawah districts of Uttar Pradesh. Like the Hindu Hurkiya, they derive their name from the hurka drum. Historically, the community was associated with prostitution, but this is no longer the case. Most Hurkiya are now daily wage labourers.	in Uttarakhand and Uttar Pradesh
Kalabaz	The word kalabaz in Hindi means an acrobat, and the Kalabaz are an endogamous sub-group within the larger Nat caste of North India. Like other Nats, they claim to have originally been Rajputs, who lost caste after their defeat at the hands of the Mughal Empire. Those Nats who became acrobats over time evolved into a distinct community. Historically, the Kalabaz were a nomadic community, but have now been settled by the Indian government. They speak Hindi, but have their own particular dialect.	in Uttar Pradesh
Kan, they are also known as Khalifa	The Kan are a small Bengali speaking Muslim community who were traditionally involved in the repairing of umbrellas. According to traditions, the Kan were originally members of the Dom community who converted to Islam. In addition to repairing umbrellas, the community are also involved in the manufacture of fishhooks.	in West Bengal and Bangladesh
Kanjar	The word kanjar has been derived from the Sanskrit kanana-chara, which means wanderer in the jungle. They are divided into four clans, the Callad, Superala, Diyal and Rachhband. A fifth group, the Patharkat are now a distinct sub-group, no longer inter-marrying with the other Kanjar groupings. A section of the Kanjar of the Punjab have converted to Islam. This community is historically associated with prostitution. The Muslim Kanjar of Punjab might have had nucleus in the Kanjar tribe, but the community has always accepted fresh recruits. Those who have followed the profession for generations are called deradars, and look down upon the latter recruits. The Kanjar also supplied the executioners during the period of Mugha] and Sikh rule in the Punjab.	throughout Northern India and Pakistan
Karwal	The word karwal is derived from the Hindi word karol, which means a sickle. They are an endogamous sub-group of the Baheliya community. Like many other gypsy like communities in North India, they were nomadic and traditionally beggars and hunters. They are further sub-divided into a number of clans, the main ones being the Purabia, Hazari, Uttariya, Koiereriya and Turkiya. According to their traditions, they were Rajputs of Jodhpur who migrated to Uttar Pradesh in the 19th century. The Karwal speak a dialect of their own, known as Karwali, which shows strong influences of Rajasthani.	They are now found in the districts of Barabanki, Basti, Gorakhpur and Lucknow.
Kela, they are also known as Kharia Muslim	They were traditionally involved in the catching of snakes, toads and birds, a profession considered derogatory by neighbouring communities. The word Kela has been derived from the word kala, which means unclean in Bengali. They are also known as Kharia Muslims, as they are said to be converts from the Kharia caste, and prefer to be known as Kharia. The Kela are Sunni Muslims, and speak Bengali.	in West Bengal
Mirasi, they are also known as Pakhwaji, Kalawart and Qawwal	The Mirasi community are the genealogists of a number of communities in Northern India. Included within the name Mirasi are a number of sub-groups, each with their own history and origin myths. Some Mirasi groups are Muslim converts from the Hindu Dom caste, while others claim to have originally belonged to the Hindu Charan community. The word mirasi is derived from the Arabic word miras, which means inheritance or sometimes heritage. Largely a Muslim community, with a Hindu and Sikh minority.	Found throughout North India and Pakistani Punjab
Mirshikar	The word Mirshikar is a combination of two Urdu words, mir meaning lord and shikar meaning a hunt, and their name means a leader of a hunting party. They were a community who were employed as trekkers by the various rulers of north and central Bihar. They were initially settled in Bihar by the rulers of Dumraon in the 18th century. The Mirshikar speak a dialect which is a combination of Urdu, Hindi and Maithili.	in Bihar
Narikurava	The word "Narikurava" is a combination of the Tamil words "Nari" and "Kurava" meaning "jackal people". of the "fox people" This appellation has been bestowed upon them due to their adeptness in hunting and trapping jackals. The main occupation of the people who originally belong to the indigenous tribes, is hunting. But as they were prohibited entry into the forests to pursue this livelihood, they were forced to take up other alternatives such as selling beaded ornaments to survive. Hence they migrate from place to place to find a market for their beads. They are entirely Hindu and speak a dialect of their own called Vagriboli.	in Tamil Nadu
Nat	The Nat are a nomadic community found in North India. They are one of number of communities that are said to be of Dom origin, and have traditions similar to the Bazigar caste. The word nata in Sanskrit means a dancer, and the Nat were traditionally entertainers and jugglers. They have fourteen sub-groups, the main ones being the Nituria, Rarhi, Chhabhayia, Tikulhara, Tirkuta, Pushtia, Rathore, Kazarhatia, Kathbangi, Banwaria, Kougarh, Lodhra, Korohia, and Gulgulia. The Nat are largely Hindu, with a small Muslim minority, and speak various dialects of Hindi.	throughout North India
Pamaria	The Pamaria claim to be by descent Parmar Rajputs who converted to Islam. Their occupation remains singing and dancing, with the Pamaria visiting households at special occasions such as weddings and births. They are also employed to singing folk songs by villagers. Their important songs are the badhaiya, sohar, nachari and samdaun. Each Pamaria family are allocated a particular area by the community. They are Sunni Muslims and speak Maithili.	in Bihar
Patharkatt, also known as Sangtarash	This Hindu community are not a sub-group of the larger Kanjar caste. Their name Patharkatt in Hindi literally means stone cutters. Having taken up the profession of stone cutting, this particular group is not related to Kanjars and the two communities have not any relation to each other. These Patharkatt people speak their patharkatt language . This language is their mother tongue.	found mainly in Bihar and Uttar Pradesh in India and in Nepal country
Perna	Nomadic group, associated with begging, and scheduled under the Criminal tribe Act. Historically Muslim, now divided evenly between Sikhism and Hinduism.	mainly in Haryana and Punjab
Qalandar	Muslim group, who are seen leading bears, monkeys and other performing animals with which they wonder, announcing the presence with an hour glass shaped drum called a damru, which is used in their performances for emphasis. Still entirely nomadic, with very few settled. Speak either Urdu or Punjabi, depending on the region they inhabit.	found in North India and Pakistani Punjab
Sansi	Sell and barter cattle, some also involved in jugglery and acrobatics. Their language is Sansiboli, Sansi or Bhilki which is a highly endangered Indo-Aryan language. Largely Hindu, with a small Muslim minority.	found in the states of Rajasthan, Haryana, Punjab
Sapera, also known as Sapela	Semi-nomadic communities found in North India, which live in camps at the outskirts of most towns and are traditionally associated with snake charming. Mostly Hindu, with a small Muslim minority. The Hindu Sapera are followers of the shakti cult and worship the goddess Kali.	found in North India, mainly in Haryana, Punjab and Uttar Pradesh
Sapera Muslims, they are also known as Mastan or Ustad	Their traditional occupation is snake charming, said to be Muslim converts from the Hindu Sapera caste. The Sapera speak a dialect which is a mixture of Urdu, Hindi and Maithili. Although Muslim, most Sapera worship a tribal deity known as Bisahari.	found in the districts of Saharsa, Champaran, Sitamarhi and Purnea in Bihar.
Sapuria	Bengali speaking Muslim community, traditionally associated with snake charming. According to some traditions, they are converts from the Hindu Bedia caste.	mainly in West Bengal and Bangladesh

== See also ==
- Nomadic tribes in India
