= Sapera (disambiguation) =

Sapera is a form of dance from India.

Sapera may also refer to:

- Sapera (Hindu), a Hindu caste found in North India
- Sapera (Muslim), a Muslim caste found in North India
- Gulabo Sapera (born 1973), Indian dancer
