= Lodha =

Name of various Indian communities

Lodha is the name of various Indian communities and may refer to:

- Lodha people, a tribal people living primarily in the Indian states of West Bengal and Odisha, mostly in the Paschim Medinipur district. A section of the Lodha has converted to Islam, and form a distinct community of Lodha Muslims.
- Lodhi (caste), agriculturalist caste primarily found in Uttar Pradesh and Madhya Pradesh, sometimes categorised as Other Backward Class, but claim Rajput ties and prefer to be known as "Lodhi-Rajput",
- Oswal, also known as Oswal Lodha, Jain community from Rajasthan.
