= Kanjar =

Tribe within the Indian subcontinent

Regions with significant populations
- India and Pakistan

Languages
- Kanjari • Hindi • Rajasthani • Bhojpuri • Urdu • Punjabi • Dogri • Kishtwari

Religion
- Hinduism • Sikhism • Islam

Related ethnic groups
- Patharkat

The Kanjar (Hindi: कंजर, Urdu: کنجر) are an Indo-Aryan people with significant populations in India, Pakistan and the wider Kashmir region. The Kanjari language is spoken mostly by the Kanjari people living in Indian subcontinent. Kanjari is a lesser-known Indo Aryan language.

== History ==
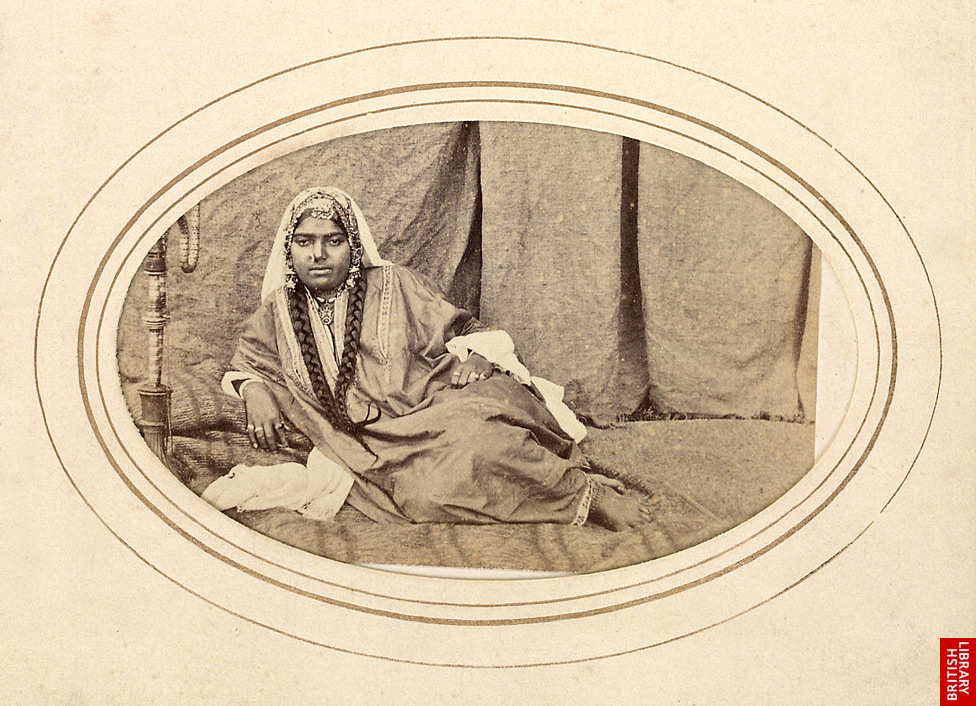
Old photograph of a Kashmiri dancing girl of the Kanjar tribe

=== British India ===
In the British Raj, the Kanjaris were listed under the 1871 Criminal Tribes Act as a tribe "addicted to the systematic commission of non-bailable offenses." Many of them escaped into the mountains of Kashmir to avoid discrimination and many also fled to other parts of the region such as Baluchistan where many settled in the Gwadar where they did not face the same prejudice as in British India systematically as it was under Omani rule. Many of them assimilated into the local identity and lived nomadically on the edges of the town.

=== India ===
In India, the Kanjari were denotified in 1952 when the Criminal Tribes Act was replaced by the Habitual Offenders Act. However, the community carries considerable social stigma, mainly due to the association of their culture with traditions distinct from mainstream Indian culture. Kanjaris are also known as Gihar which is not a notified tribe. The 2011 Indian census showed a Kanjari population of 115,968 in Uttar Pradesh.

For centuries, Lucknow was a hub for affluent families would send their children to be educated in Lucknow. This has been home to a large community of Kanjari for centuries. A recent study found that: "A Kanjari hears the music of tabla and ghungroo from the day of her birth and must begin her formal education before her non-Kanjari friends start going to school."

=== Pakistan ===
In Pakistan, the community go by the name Kanjari or Khanabadosh. Over the centuries they became associated with the profession of peripatetic craftsmen and entertainers, best known for the terracotta toys they produce. The term 'Kanjar' is a slur generally used to refer to a person of low moral character than as a reference to the tribe.

Although nomadic, the Kanjari follow a set route and often maintain a relationship with the villages they visit. Many of the men work as agricultural labourers. Their tents are made from split bamboo or munji grass, and their encampments can be found at the edges of villages, as well as in urban areas.

Today all of them are Muslim and many of them operate small businesses and have assimilated into local areas and speak local languages. They are also known as Khanabadosh across Pakistan. They are found widely across Kashmir, Punjab, Sindh and Balochistan.

According to a survey conducted by a private sector agency, there are 7 million gypsies in Pakistan – 2m of them in Balochistan (mainly in Makran) and 1.1m in the Punjab.

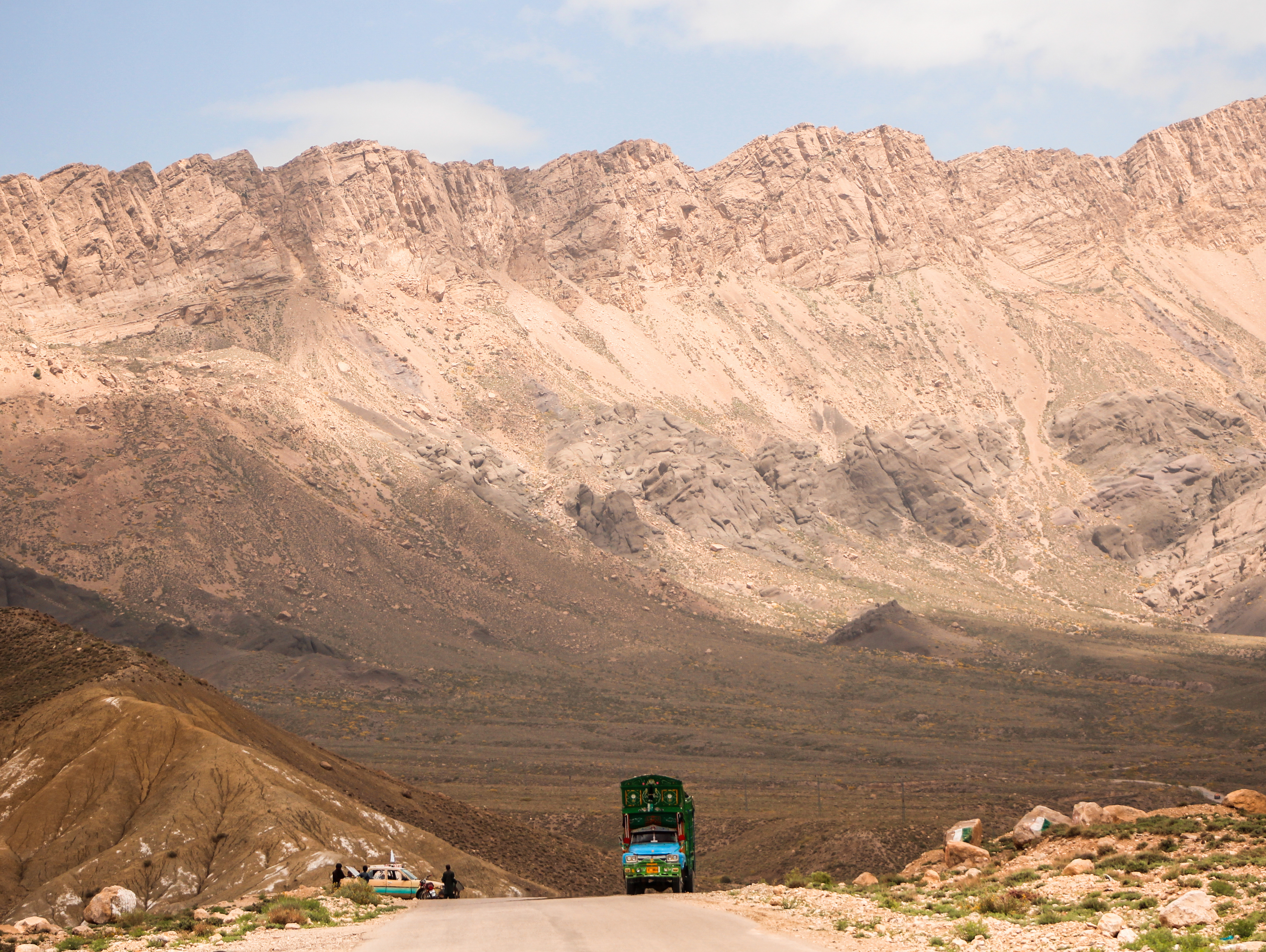
A Khanabadosh roaming Balochistan, Pakistan

== Popular culture ==
They are the subject of the Hindi story Indrajal (Magic in English), by Jaishankar Prasad.

In the Lollywood film Bol, prominent character Saqa Kanjari, financially helps a fanatic hakim after the latter bribes the police to cover up the honour killing of his son. The hakim in return had to bear a daughter for Saqa Kanjar's daughter Meena.

== See also ==
- Gihara
