= Tarak Chandra Das =

Indian anthropologist

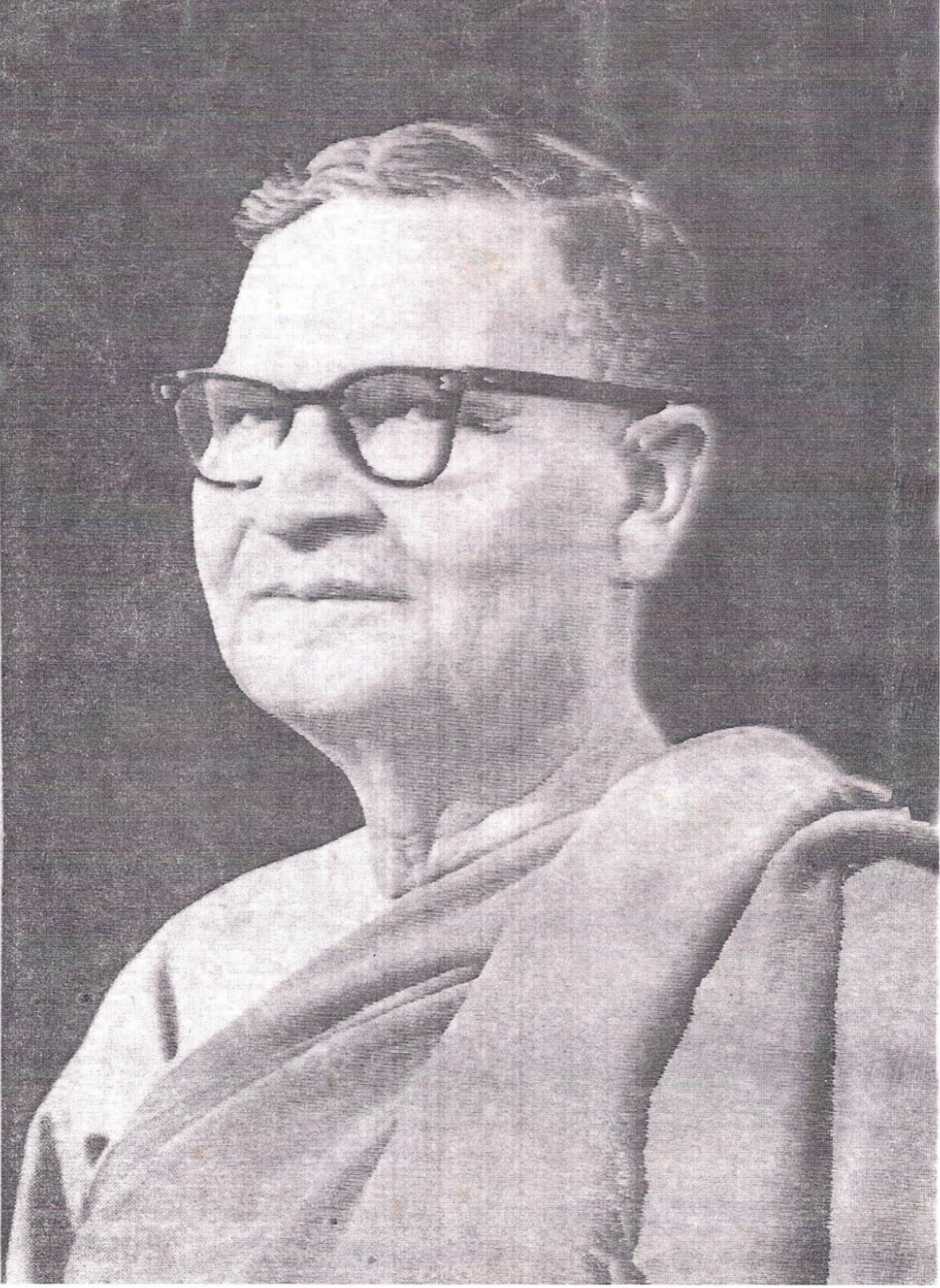
- Professor Tarak Chandra Das
- Born: 1898; Tangail, Bengal Presidency, British India
- Died: 1964 (aged 65–66); Kolkata, West Bengal, India
- Occupations: Anthropologist, Sociologist, social worker

Tarak Chandra Das (1898–1964) was an anthropologist of Calcutta University. He did his Masters' from Calcutta University in ‘Ancient Indian History and Culture’ and joined the then newly founded Department of Anthropology at the University of Calcutta (the first Department of Anthropology in India) in 1921 as a research scholar and then he became lecturer in 1923 and finally retired as a Reader from the department in 1963. Das conducted extensive fieldworks in Chotanagpur in the then Bihar and in Assam.

== Early life ==
Tarak Chandra Das was born in January 1898, in the erstwhile undivided Bengal, now under Bangladesh in a Mahishya family. He had his early school education from Tangail and Rajshahi of present day Bangladesh.

== Contributions ==
Das was interested in the application of anthropology. In 1941, he delivered the Sectional Presidential address in the Anthropology Section of the Indian Science Congress on the ‘Cultural Anthropology in the Service of the Individual and the Nation’. In the address, Das elaborately charted out the future path of Indian anthropology with a description of the social dynamics of the tribal and peasant societies in India in the context of the role of anthropologists in nation building. Two books written by T.C. Das bears testimony of his observation and collection of data through anthropological fieldwork. One is his monograph on the Purum Kuku tribe of north-east India and the other is on the Great Bengal Famine during the Second World War. [Bengal famine (1943): As revealed in a survey of the destitutes of Calcutta, 1949]. Both the books were published by the University of Calcutta. Northeast India provided windows for Das in his applied anthropological approach towards nation building.

The Purum monograph was one of the most comprehensive works produced by an anthropologist on the life of a small tribe and it became a major source of data for a number of world-renowned social anthropologists of Great Britain and United States in later years. The book on the Famine of Bengal which took place in 1943 was a unique and rare first-hand study done by any anthropologist or social scientist on the victims of one of the greatest tragedies of India under the colonial rule. An earlier version of the book was discussed in the then British Parliament and some of the recommendations advanced by Das were adopted by the Famine Inquiry Commission in 1944 formed by the colonial government for the prevention of future famines in India.

The Nobel Laureate economist Amartya Sen cited Das's original work in his famous book Poverty and Famines. Throughout the book, one finds description by Das wherein dry quantitative data, graphs and tables were made alive with human stories of grim struggles between hunger and finer sentiments of love, affection and kindness’ Das had conducted intensive fieldwork among three tribes in eastern India, viz. Ho, Kharia and Bhumij during 1927–31 and had shown how these tribes maintained their sociocultural identities.

Apart from his success as an ethnographer, Das was also an armchair anthropologist. His studies on culture around fish in Bengal, museums and dowry restriction law provided examples of his keen interest in dealing with archival materials and written texts in social anthropological and sociological studies. Besides being a meticulous ethnographer he was also a conscientious teacher, who trained many students, including Surajit Chandra Sinha, who went on to become a prominent anthropologist in his own right and also, Prabodh Kumar Bhowmick, who became a distinguished academic and the head of the Anthropology department at the University of Calcutta.
