= Kanjari language =

Tribal language of India

Kanjari
- कंजरी کنجري
- Native to: India, Pakistan
- Native speakers: 210,000 (2011)
- Language family: Indo-European: Indo-Iranian; Indo-Aryan; Western Indo-Aryan; Rajasthani; Kanjari

Language codes
- ISO 639-3: kft
- Glottolog: kanj1259

Kanjari (also known as Kangar Bhat, Kangri, Kuchbandhi or "the Gypsy language") is an Indo-Aryan language associated with the Kanjar people of India and Pakistan. Kanjari is spoken in Punjab and parts of Balochistan in Pakistan, and Uttar Pradesh and Rajasthan in India. UNESCO classifies Kanjari as an endangered language.

== Syntax ==
George Abraham Grierson noted several grammatical features for Kanjari in the first Linguistic Survey of India:

- The final "ō" of adjectives is usually kept before an inflected noun, which suggests that adjectives are not inflected and that gender is weak. For example, tēro naukrī ("thy service").
- Some pronouns are similar to Rajasthani languages, such as the demonstrative pronouns jō and jī. However, other pronouns are similar to the Dravidian languages, such as ūr ("he") compared to Tamil īr and Gondi ōr.
- Overall, verb conjugations and words "broadly agree" with the patterns of Eastern Rajasthani languages, but some characteristics point to a "certain Dravidian element" being present in Kanjari.

== Vocabulary ==
Selected Kanjari Vocabulary
Kanjari	English	Cognate
lug	die	
lugai	beat	
chūbkō	son	
rib	house	
tig	see	
pāḍō	bull	māḍu (Tamil)
tiūr	give	tara (Tamil)
ghamēlā	sun	kham (Romani)
jhūkal	dog	jukel (Romani)
