= Bazigar language =

Indo-Aryan language spoken in India

Bazigar
- ਬਾਜ਼ੀਗਰੀ / بازیگری
- Native to: India
- Region: Punjab and neighbouring states
- Ethnicity: Bazigar
- Native speakers: (58,000 cited 1981 census)
- Language family: Indo-European: Indo-Iranian; Indo-Aryan; (unclassified); Bazigar

Language codes
- ISO 639-3: bfr
- Glottolog: bazi1237

A native Bazigar speaker.

The Bazigar, Goaar, or Guar language is a language spoken by the Bazigar ethnic group (Note: Schreffler (2011) argues that they are a distinct ethnic group. Singh (2010) regards them as a branch of the Banjara, whereas Ibbetson claimed at the end of the 19th century that they are merely an occupational group.) of north-western India who are found primarily in Punjab, but also in Haryana, Uttar Pradesh, Delhi, Chandigarh, Himachal Pradesh, Jammu and Kashmir and Rajasthan.

It is apparently an Indo-Aryan language (Ethnologue) while Glottolog has labelled it "unclassifiable". Schreffler argues that it compares well with the Western Rajasthani dialects as well as with Punjabi (with which it is not mutually intelligible), while Deb notes its resemblance to Bagri. Ethnologue formerly classified it as a Dravidian language.

== Background ==
Initially nomadic and with a traditional occupation involving acrobatics and performance arts, they are now largely settled and mostly engaged in agricultural and other forms of labour. Several of the major Bazigar groups currently found in Indian Punjab migrated at the time of Partition in 1947 from Western Punjab (now in Pakistan), where they had started settling earlier in the century.

The ethnic Bazigar are estimated at half a million in Punjab, but the language is not spoken by all. The younger generation are shifting to the regional languages, for example Schreffler reports that people younger than 30 prefer to use the regional language with one another, and speak Bazigar only with older people.

The language is also known as Guar boli, or goāroṅ ri bolī "Guars' speech", after the name that the community uses for itself. Bazigar has no written literature.

Additionally, the Bazigar have an artificial secret language which they use when they do not want to be understood by outsiders. They call it Parsi or Pashto (not to be confused with the Persian and Pashto languages).

== Linguistic characteristics ==
Bazigar has an almost identical phonology to Punjabi except for the presence of the voiceless palatal fricative /ç/ and the absence of the voiceless glottal fricative /h/. Words with initial /h/ in Punjabi correspond to words with a tone in Bazigar. There are differences from Punjabi in the vocabulary and the morphology, notably in the absence of a vowel feminine ending (e.g. /buɖʱ/ 'old woman'), and there are similarities to Hindi and Western Rajasthani, for example the genitive marker /ro/ and the dative marker /ne/.

== Phonology ==
=== Vowels ===
	Front-Central	Near-back/Back
Close	iː	uː
Near-close	ɪ	ʊ
Close-mid	eː	oː
Mid	ə	
Open-mid	ɛː	ɔː
Open	aː	

=== Consonants ===
		Labial	Dental/ Alveolar	Retroflex	Post-alv.	Palatal	Velar	Uvular
Nasal		m	n	ɳ		ɲ	ŋ	
Stop/ Affricate	tenuis	p	t̪	ʈ	t͡ʃ		k	q
Stop/ Affricate	aspirated	pʰ	tʰ	ʈʰ	t͡ʃʰ		kʰ	
Stop/ Affricate	voiced	b	d̪	ɖ	d͡ʒ		ɡ	
Fricative	voiceless	f	s		ʃ	ç	x	
Fricative	voiced		z				ɣ	
Rhotic			ɾ~r	ɽ				
Approximant		ʋ	l	ɭ		j		

== See also ==
- Lambadi language, spoken by the Banjara

== Bibliography ==
- Deb, P. C. (1987). Bazigars of Punjab: A Socio-economic Study. Delhi: Mittal Publications.
- Schreffler, Gibb (2011). "The Bazigar (Goaar) People and Their Performing Arts" (PDF). Journal of Punjab Studies. 18 (1&2).
- Singh, Birinder Pal, ed. (2010). "Criminal" Tribes of Punjab: A Social-anthropological Inquiry. Routledge. ISBN 9780415551472.
- Singh, Gurpeet (2016). "Bazigari". In Devy, Ganesh; Koul, Omkar N.; Bhat, Roop Krishen (eds.). The Languages of Punjab. People's Linguistic Survey of India. Vol. 24. Hyderabad: Orient Blackswan. pp. 116–20. ISBN 978-8125062400.
