= Prabodh Kumar Bhowmick =

Indian anthropologist

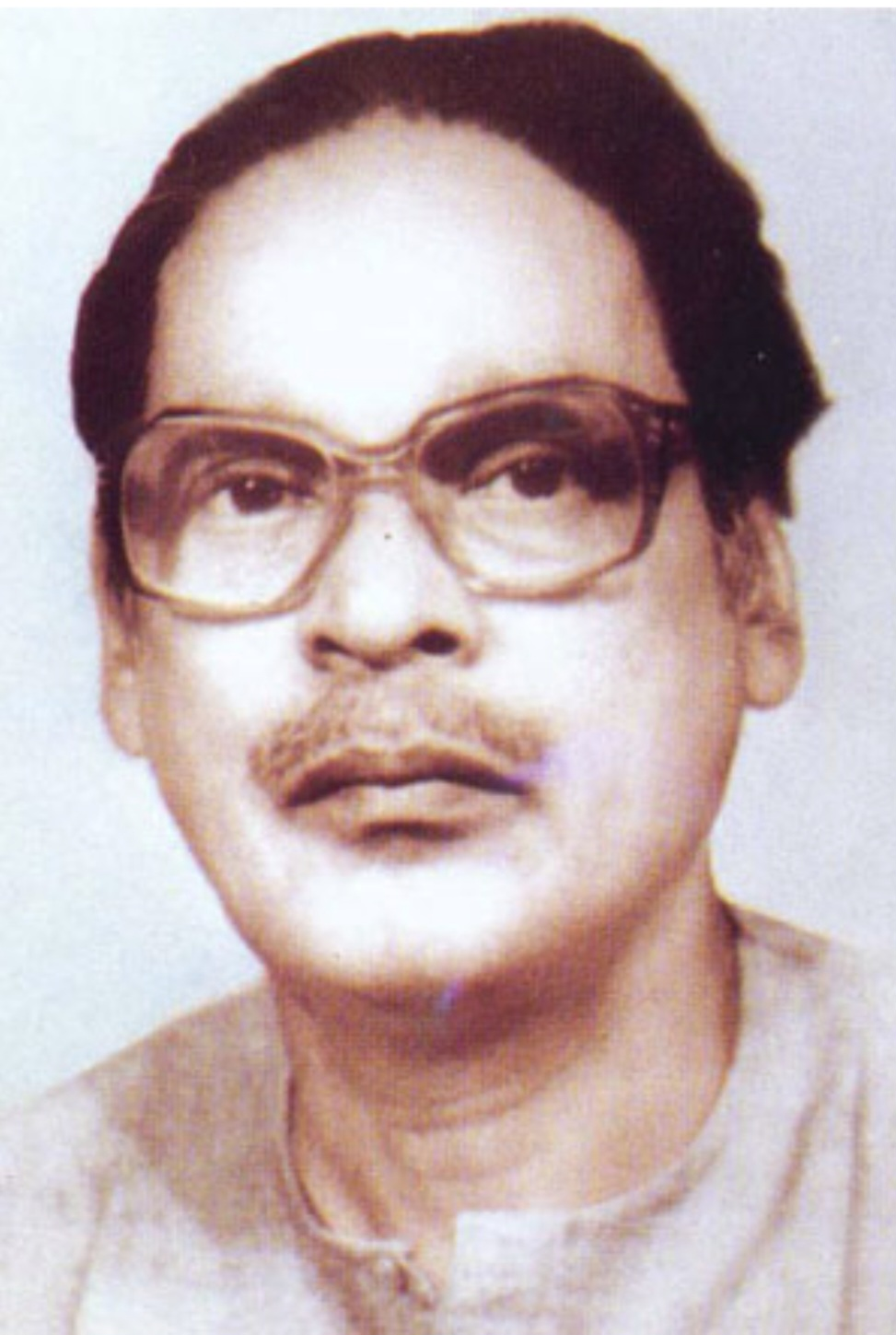
- Born: 6 September 1926
- Died: 5 February 2003 (aged 76–77)
- Education: Bangabasi College (I.Sc.) University of Calcutta (B.Sc, M.Sc, Ph.D, D.Sc)
- Occupations: Anthropologist, social work

Prabodh Kumar Bhowmick (6 September 1926 – 5 February 2003) was an Indian anthropologist from West Bengal. He conducted his work on the Lodha tribe of West Bengal.

== Early life ==
Bhowmick was born on 6 September 1926, in Amdabad village, Nandigram, Purba Medinipur district. He was born into an aristocratic Mahishya family, being the third of eight children born to Jogendranath and Swaryamoyee Devi.

== Education ==
Bhowmick's early education took place at Kalagachia Jagadish Vidyapith, an early national school established in the Midnapore district in 1921. He pursued higher education in anthropology, completing his Indian School Certificate in 1949 from the Bangabasi College (Kolkata) and his Bachelor of Science and Master of Science in 1951 from the University of Calcutta. His teachers included anthropologists Tarak Chandra Das and Nirmal Kumar Bose. He later earned his Ph.D. in 1961, focusing on the socio-economic life of the Lodha tribe.

== Contributions and legacy ==
Bhowmick's work in applied anthropology focused on indigenous communities. He was awarded Doctor of Science in social anthropology. His Doctor of Philosophy research examined the Lodhas, a denotified tribe in West Bengal.

He founded BIDISA (Bureau for Integrated Development of Indigenous and Sub-Human Aided Groups), a non-governmental organization in West Bengal.

He taught anthropology at the University of Calcutta, and other institutions, as a professor. He later served as Head of the Post-graduate Department of Anthropology and Dean of the Faculty of Science at the University of Calcutta. During his tenure, he published journal articles and edited volumes on tribal studies, rural development, and applied anthropology.

== Death ==
Bhowmick died on 5 February 2003, at the age of 76, after being injured when a person fell on him from a moving bus.
