= Chuni Kotal =

Indian Dalit anthropologist

- Born: 1965; Gohaldihi, Paschim Medinipur district, West Bengal
- Died: August 16, 1992 (aged 26–27); Kharagpur, Paschim Medinipur district, West Bengal
- Cause of death: Suicide
- Education: Vidyasagar University (BA)
- Known for: Social work
- Spouse: Manmatha Savar (m. 1990)

Chuni Kotal was an Adivasi social worker and the first woman graduate from the Lodha community, a Particularly vulnerable tribal group (PVTG) in India. Her death in 1992 drew national attention to allegations of systemic discrimination faced by tribal communities in educational institutions.

== Personal life ==
Born in 1965, in village Gohaldihi, in Paschim Medinipur district, West Bengal, into a poor Lodha family with 3 brothers and 3 sisters.

Kotal married Manmatha Savar in 1990 through a court marriage. They had known each other since 1981. Savar, a high school graduate, was employed at the railway workshop in Kharagpur.

== Education and career ==
Kotal got her first job as a Lodha Social worker after her junior college in 1983 at Jhargram ITDP office, surveying local villages.

In 1985, she graduated in anthropology from Vidyasagar University, becoming the first woman from the Lodha community to do so—a group that had been historically classified as a criminal tribe under British colonial rule. Two years after graduation, she was appointed as a Hostel superintendent at 'Rani Shiromoni SC and ST Girls' Hostel' at Medinipur, here again she had to face the social stigma attached with her tribe.

During her Masters course (MSc) at the Vidyasagar University, she was allegedly discriminated by university administrators, who refused to give her the requisite pass grades, despite her having fulfilled the criteria. The institution authority opined that a low-born person coming from a "criminal tribe", a Denotified tribe of India, did not have the social privilege and pre-ordained destiny to study "higher discourse" like the social sciences. In 1991, after losing two years at the course, she complained, and a high level enquiry commission was set up by the state Education minister to no avail, once the fact that she belonged to a former criminal tribe came to light.

== Death ==
On 14 August 1992, frustrated by years casteist and racist harassment at Medinipur, she left Medinipur and went to meet her husband, Manmatha Savar, who had been working at Railway workshop at Kharagpur, where she committed suicide on 16 August 1992, at the age of 27.

Her death became the focal point of immense political, human rights and social controversy in the media in West Bengal, and eastern India, where the discourse is traditionally Brahmin-Baniya dominated.

Upon her death, Bangla Dalit Sahitya Sanstha, Kolkata, organized a mass movement through different seminars and street corners, street play protesting against university teachers, on the street of Kolkata.

== Legacy ==
Since 1993, it organizes the Annual Chuni Kotal Memorial Lecture in Kolkata every year. Later a motivational video film has been produced on her life story by Department of Education, Govt. of India

Her story was highlighted by noted writer-activist Mahasweta Devi in her book in Bengali, Byadhkhanda in (1994), ( The Book of the Hunter (2002))

Har Na Mana Har (2021) is a Bengali novel has been written by Subhabrata Basu based on her tragic life
