= Gollewar =

Caste in some states of India

The Gollawar (Golla) (also known as Gaur, Gaura, Gouda or Gowda) is a caste found mostly in the states of Andhra Pradesh, Bihar, Karnataka, Telangana, Maharashtra and Odisha in India. Like the Kuruba, Kuruva and Kuruma, they predominantly herd sheep, goat and cattle.

Hassan (1920) writes that the Golla have synonyms like Gollewar, Golar, Gollam, Gulla, Gullar, Gauvali and Dhangar.They are the part of the Yadav community in southern India.

== See also ==
- Beerappa
- Golla (caste)
- Sangoli Rayanna
- Kuruba
- Beerendra Keshava Tarakananda Puri
