= Champaran District =

Former district of British India

- Former district
- Location in Bihar, India Champaran District (Bihar)
- Coordinates: 26°21′28″N 85°6′48″E
- Country: India
- State: Bihar
- Time zone: UTC+5:30 (IST)

Champaran District was a district of British India. It remained an administrative district until its bifurcation in 1972, when it was divided into East Champaran district and West Champaran district.

In 1917, Mohandas Karamchand Gandhi launched his first Champaran Satyagraha in India in Champaran against the exploitative indigo plantation system practised by European planters and supported by the colonial administration.

Historically, Mehsi has been regarded as the Gateway of Champaran. Gandhi received a public welcome at Mehsi railway station on 15 April 1917 while travelling to Motihari during the Champaran Satyagraha.

== History ==
It was created in 1866. On 2 November 1972 it was split into two districts: West Champaran and East Champaran (Paschim and Purbi Champaran).

In 1917, Mohandas Gandhi lead a satyagraha movement in the Champaran district against European landowners and government policies. During that time British landowners used to pressurize local peasants to grow indigo and sell it in lower prices. In response the British government arrested Gandhi, and later released and appointed him in an investigating committee. The British government later did amendments to improve the situation of peasants. This was Gandhi's first movement in India, and later he became the leader of the Indian National Congress.
