= Gihara =

Hindu caste

The Gihara are a caste found in various states of India. They belong to the Gipsy clan. They are considered to be among the nomadic or partially-settled communities.

== History and origin ==
Gihara people are migrants from Rajasthan, who went into diaspora after the war in Haldighati. This gave birth to their modern name in their language, Ghar harna or Greh hara ("we lost in war") slowly corrupted into Gihara. Their language is derived from Persian. The traditional trades of the people are clothing trading, artisan work like broom making and wood carving.

== Present circumstances ==
The Gihara are strictly endogamous and are divided into many exogamous clans. These are the Vaid, Soda, Sankat, Bhainsh, Otwar, Gohar, Sani, Marriayyah and Khatabiya.

Many Gihara are still involved in their traditional occupation of stone sculpting. Some in ancient times were involved in rope making and bamboo fencing. Many people still engage in traditional occupations such as kuchbandiya and sirkibandiya. Some are engaged in cottage industries.
