= Lodha Muslims =

Tribal people of West Bengal, India

The Lodha Muslim are a tribal or Adivasi community found in the state of West Bengal in India. They are a Muslim tribe. The exact circumstances of the conversion of the Lodha people to Islam remains shrouded in mystery, but the conversion process was gradual, and the community still preserves many of their pre-Islamic customs. They are found mainly in the Midnapore District, in particular in the villages of Madhya Hingli, Uttar Rani Chak, Gamatub, Maniktala, Laldighi, Chapbasan, Sodhpur and Piyada.

The traditional occupation of the Lodha was hunting and gathering, in particular catching of snakes and toads, and then selling their skins. They are no longer hunters and gatherers, and the community has now taken up the occupation as locksmiths. A small number are also marginal farmers, but their holdings are incredibly small. The bulk of the community are now wage labourers, with a steady migration to the city of Kolkata.

The Lodha are strictly endogamous community, and prefer to marry close kin. They are residentially segregated, live in their own quarters within the villages they reside. Each settlement contains a jati panchayat or caste council, which maintains social control, and resolves any intra-community dispute. The community are Sunni Muslims and have customs similar to those of the Bengali Muslims.

== See also ==
- Kela (tribe)
