= Pancholi =

Clan of Ahir caste of Gujarat, India

The Ahir Pancholi are clan of the Ahir caste found in the state of Gujarat, India.

According to the Anthropological Survey of India, Ahirs are aware of the Hindu Varna system and regard themselves as belonging to the Kshatriya Varna.
