= Perna caste =

Hindu caste

The Perna are a Hindu caste found mainly in the state of Haryana in India.

== Origin ==
The Perna were a nomadic tribe, referred to as vagrant by British ethnographers, similar in background to the Nat and Bazigar communities. They were said to be a sub-group of the Dom community. As a semi-nomadic community which was alleged to be involved with prostitution.

== Present circumstances ==
The Perna are now a settled community and provide the bulk of the agricultural labourers in Haryana. A small number have been given land, and form a community of settled agriculturists. A significant number have also started to migrate to the towns and cities of Haryana, where they are employed mainly in the construction industry. Like other Dom groups, their economic condition is precarious. The community has been accorded scheduled caste status.
