= Sanghar caste =

Mixed-religious community in India

Sanghar
سنگھار

Regions with significant populations
- Sindh (Pakistan) • Gujarat (India)

Languages
- Kutchi • Sindhi

Religion
- Islam • Hinduism

The Sanghar or Sanghaar (Sindhi: سنگھار) is a branch of Manka tribe found in the Kutch district of Gujarat in India and Sindh province of Pakistan.
