= Dumi =

Coordinates: 27°33′N 83°50′E

Dumi दुमी
- Village development committee
- Interactive map of Dumi
- Country: Nepal
- Province: Sudurpashchim Province
- District: Achham District
- Rural municipality: Chaurpati Rural Municipality

Population (2001)
  - Total: 1,877
  - Religions: Hindu Christian
- Time zone: UTC+5:45 (Nepal Time)

Dumi is a village in the Chaurpati Rural Municipality of Achham District in the Sudurpashchim Province of western Nepal. At the time of the 1991 Nepal census, the village had a population of 1517 living in 338 houses. At 2001, the population was 1937, of which 37.6% was literate.
