= Heri (caste) =

Indian Hindu caste

The Heri are a Hindu caste found in the states of Haryana and Punjab in India.

== Origin ==
The Heri originated in Rajasthan, and have immigrated some four centuries ago. According to traditions, the word Heri is derived from the Rajasthani word her, meaning Aheriya. They were still quite recently a nomadic community. The Heri are one of the many Romani-like groupings found in North India, with their specialist occupation being expert trackers and fighters. They still speak Rajasthani, and are found throughout Haryana.

According to their traditions, the Aheri are Aheriyas by origin, who were soldiers in the army of Maharana Pratap. After the defeat of the Maharana by the Mughal Empire, the Aheri were hunted down by the Mughal armies. To escape the Mughals, they fled and settled in Punjab, Uttar Pradesh, Delhi and Haryana. The Aheri are found mainly in the districts of Patiala, Bhathinda, Firuzpur, and Faridkot.

== Present circumstances ==
In Haryana, they are now mainly a community of settled agriculturist.

The Aheri of Punjab, Haryana speak Rajasthani among themselves, and Punjabi with outsiders. They are strictly endogamous, and practice clan exogamy. Within the Aheri community also known Heri community, the Thori sub-group are considered of inferior status, and there are no intermarriage between the Thori sub-group and other Aheris. Their clans called gotra from the Sanskrit gotra or clan, the main ones being the Rawal, Rana, Aheria, Rajput, Singh, Sisodhiya, Chittauri and Chittodia.
