= Hurkiya =

Caste

The Hurkiya are a caste found in the states of Uttar Pradesh and Uttarakhand in India. They have been granted Scheduled Caste status in both these states. In fact, there are two distinct communities that go by the name Hurkiya, those of Uttarakhand, who are Hindu by religion, and those found in western Uttar Pradesh, who are Muslim. Both Hurkiya are of common origin, being a sub-group within the Dom ethnic group, and are one of the many gypsy-like groupings found in North India.

== Hindu Hurkiya of Uttarakhand ==
The Hindu Hurkiya are a small endogamous community found in the Kumaon region, where they are also known as Mirasi. They derive their name from an instrument the hurka, a tiny hand drum which they played, while their women danced. According to their origin myths, the Hurkiya were originally settled in the Gangolihat area of Pithoragarh District, from where they spread to other parts of Uttarakhand. The community were employed by the Johari Bhotia as singers and entertainers, and most Hurkiya are still found in the Johar Valley. There are also a tradition, that the Hurkiya were invited from the plains of Uttar Pradesh by the Khas Rajput clans of Chougarkha in Allmora District. In terms of distribution, the Hurkiya are mainly found in the towns of Munsiyari, Didihat and Baram, all in Pithoragarh District. A small number are also found in Almora and Nainital districts. The Hurkiya speak Kumaoni, although most can also understand Hindi.

== Social Structure of the Hindu Hurkoya ==
The Hurkiya society is divided into six endogamous patrilineages called raths. Of these, three lineages assume the name Mirasi, and consider themselves superior to the other three, namely the Badi, Nat and Bhand. The three Mirasi clans are known as Pangi ke Mirasi, Biljual ke Mirasi and Tolia ke Mirasi, Pangi, Biljual and Tolia being well known Bhotia clans. These three Mirasi groups were the traditional genealogists of three Bhot clans. While the Mirasi groups historically intermarried, there are occasional intermarriages with the other groupings.

Traditionally, the Hurkiya used to entertain their Bhotiya and Khas Rajput clients, with the men playing the hurka drums and the women dancing. While Nat Hurkiya were acrobats and Bhand Hurkiya were jesters. However, almost all the Hurkiya have abandoned their traditional occupation, and are now involved in selling fancy items such as bangles, combs, mirrors and toys. A significant numbers have taken to tailoring, and in absence of a traditional tailoring castes in their neighbourhood, have in effect become the traditional tailors of Uttarakhand.

Like most Hindu castes of similar status, the Hurkiya have a biradari panchayat or caste association, which exercises social control, and punishes those who transgress community norms. Like many hill communities, the Hurkiya combine shamanistic beliefs to their Hindu religion. The Shaman is known as a dangaria, who said to be possessed of the spirit of Bhairav.

== Muslim Hurkiya ==
The Muslim Hurkiya are found mainly in Agra, Farrukhabad, and Etawah districts of Uttar Pradesh. Like the Hindu Hurkiya, they derive their name from the hurka drum. Historically, the community was associated with prostitution, but this is no longer the case. Most Hurkiya are now daily wage labourers. As a community, they are particularly marginalized and ostracised on account of their historic occupation. They are entirely Sunni, but incorporate folk beliefs and visit shrines of various prominent Sufis.

== See also ==
- Mirasi
