= Nat (caste) =

Hindu Social group in India

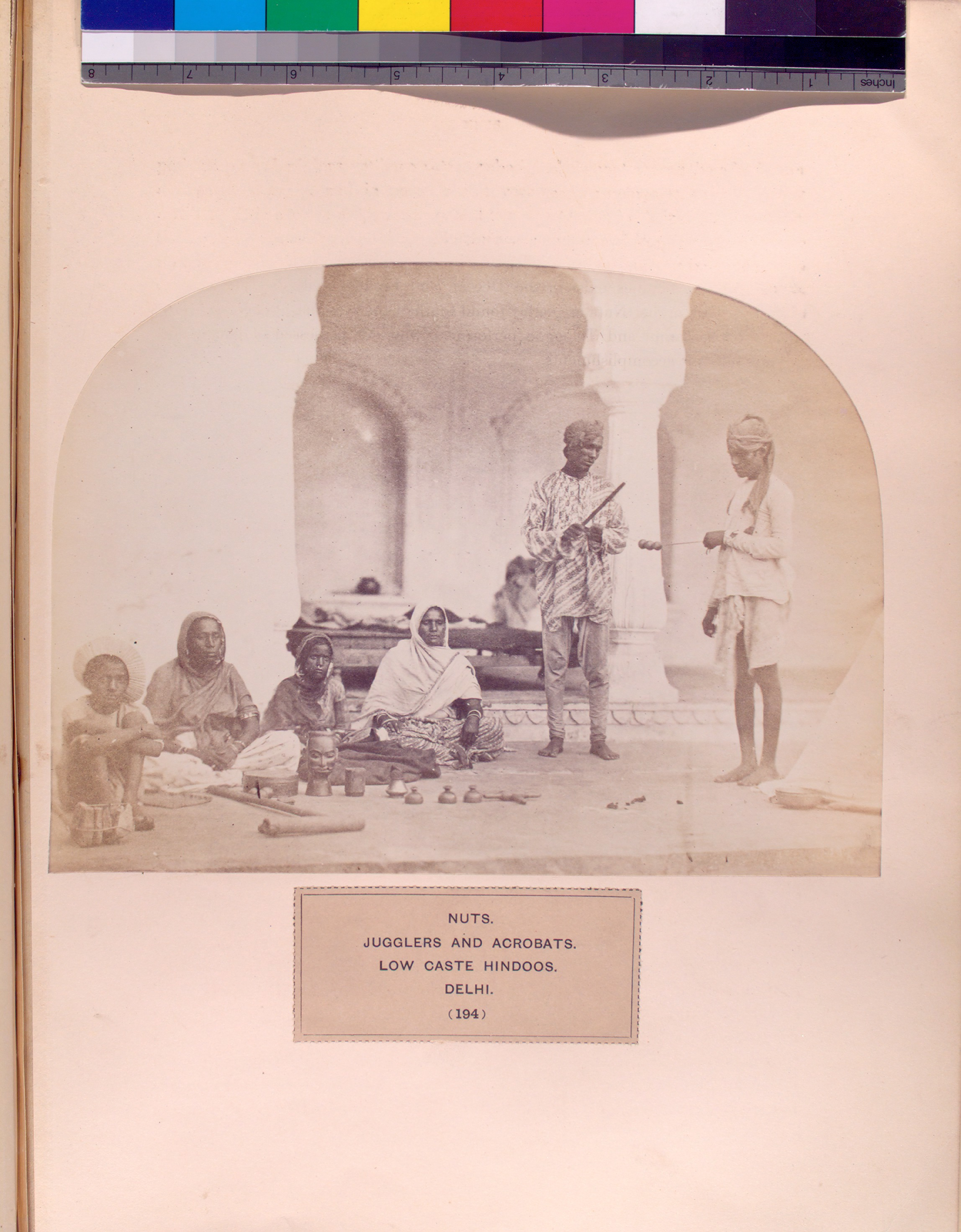

Regions with significant populations
- North India • Pakistan
- Uttar Pradesh: 214,344 (2011)
- Bihar: 166,987 (2023) (Note: Hindu and Muslim)
- Rajasthan: 65,904 (2011)

Languages
- Regional dialects

Religion
- Hinduism • Islam

Related ethnic groups
- Bazigar • Perna

The Nat are a caste found in northern India. Their traditional occupation has been that of entertainers and dancers.

== History and origin ==
Those of Bihar claim a Rajput origin, and have traditions similar to the Bazigar caste. The word nat in Sanskrit means a dancer, and the Nat were traditionally entertainers and jugglers. They have fourteen sub-groups, being the Nituria, Rarhi, Chhabhayia, Tikulhara, Tirkuta, Pushtia, Rathore, Solanki, Kazarhatia, Kathbangi, Banwaria, Kougarh, Lodhra, Korohia, and Gulgulia or Gauleri. The Nat maintain strict clan exogamy, and each clan is of equal status.

In Punjab, the Nat claim to be by origin Brahmin of Marwar, whose duty was supply of funeral pyres. On a particular occasion, as the community was transporting the funeral pyre, a member of the party died. This was seen as a bad omen, and the community were outcastes. They therefore took the occupation of dancing. They are closely connected with the Bazigar community, who are the jugglers of Punjab. But the two communities remain distinct, and do not intermarry. The community have Scheduled Caste status, and are found mainly in the districts of Gurdaspur and Amritsar.

In Haryana, Nat traditions say that they are descended from two Chamar brothers, Asa and Basa. The community is divided along religious lines, with a separate and distinct community of Muslim Nat. There traditional occupation was that of an acrobat and entertainer, and provided entertainment to the courts of the various princes.

== Language ==
The Nats do not have a distinct language of their own, but instead speak the regional dialects of the areas they are found in. Grierson, however, reported in 1922 that the Nat groups additionally use an artificial secret language, known by names such as naṭī, naṭõ kī bolī, khara khare. The variety of this language used in Uttar Pradesh shows some features typical of Rajasthani.

== Present circumstances ==
=== Bihar ===
According to the 2023 Bihar caste census the Nat community has a population of 166,987, of which 105,358 (63.09%) are Hindu and 61,629 (36.91%) Muslim. The community is now associated with cattle trading, with poorer members being professional beggars. Like other nomadic communities they are extremely marginalised. They speak the Magahi language and are found in Gaya, Bhojpur and Rohtas districts. There are also some Nats in Muzaffarpur district who primarily speak Bajjika and now claim use the surname Rai.

The Hindu Nats are classified as a Scheduled Caste while the Muslim Nats are classified as Extremely Backward Class (EBC) in Bihar.

=== Punjab ===
The Nat are a poor landless community and they are mainly engaged as unskilled labourers. They have now abandoned their traditional occupation of rope dancing. The community is strictly endogamous, and consist of a number of clans, the main ones being the Muchal, Bhati and Puwar. Like other Hindu communities, they practice clan exogamy. The community was nomadic, but they are now settled. They remain one of the most marginal communities in Punjab.

=== Haryana ===
The Nat in Haryana remain a semi-nomadic community found mainly in the districts of Karnal, Faridabad, Gurgaon and Rohtak. They speak the Haryanvi language and understand Hindi. The Nat consist of a number of exogamous clans, the main ones being the Dagariya, Sansebar, Baraike, Khoyareke, Paharike, Nangariye, Dhadhasiya, Palike, Jirmichya, Dangiya, Kotiya, Shirkarake, Dilwati, Occhluke, Rashidiya, and Badanke. The Nat are no longer involved in their traditional occupation, and are now largely landless agriculture workers, migrating to different places in search of employment.

=== Uttar Pradesh ===
The 2011 Census of India for Uttar Pradesh showed the total Nat Scheduled Caste population (Hindus only) as 214,344. There are two endogamous sub-groups in the state, being the Bajania Nat and the Brijbasi Nat

==== Bajania Nat ====
Bajania Nat get their name from the Hindi word bajana, which means to play a musical instruments. They were traditionally the acrobats and tumblers of village India. The Bajania are largely a nomadic community, with the community establishing camps at the end of villages. The Nat are further divided into five groups, the Karnat, Kalabaz, who are also known as Thakur Nat, the Kabutar Bhanmata, the Chamar Nat, and finally the Muslim Nat, which are now practically a separate and distinct community. Each of these sub-grouping was associated with a particular occupation, the Karnat were singers, while the Kalabaz were acrobats. The five sub-divisions are further sub-divided into clans, known as gotras. Among the Karnat, the main gotras are the Mutana, Chapaneri, Rangni, Nakna, Sakodaria, Makriyana and Gagolia. Marriages are strictly prohibited within the clan. With the exception of the Muslim Nat, all the subgroups are Hindu and their tribal deities are Kali Maiya and Bundela.

The traditional occupation of the Nat in Uttar Pradesh was village entertainer, and they were acrobats, jugglers, tightrope walkers and singers. With the growth in televisions, the community has seen a decline in their traditional occupations, which has led to a decline in their economic circumstances. This is seen in the prevalence of child labour among the community. Furthermore, as a Dalit community, they often suffer from societal discrimination. Each of their encampment consists of a caste council, known as path. The panth resolves intra community disputes, and also acts as a crude welfare association.

==== Brijbasi Nat ====
The Brijbasi Nat name figuratively means an inhabitant of Brij or modern day Mathura, and as such they are a territorial grouping, their name meaning the Nat of Braj country. The community is found mainly in Farrukhabad, Shahjahanpur, Hardoi, Bareilly, Budaun, Mainpuri, Etawah and Agra districts. They speak Braj Bhasha and are Hindus. The Brijbasi have Durga as their tribal deity.

They are strictly endogamous, and practice clan exogamy. The Brijbasi community consists of seven clans, namely the Bijrawat, Dharam Saut, Kakera, gwal, Kurra, Mucchar and Wadaut. Marriages are strictly prohibited within the clan. The Brijbasi are a landless community, and they are mainly musicians and dancers. At the time of social functions, they are required to perform for their patrons, who tend to belong to the locally dominant castes. But a greater number are now employed as wage labourers. They live in multi-caste villages, but occupy their own distinct quarters. As a Dalit community, they often suffer from societal discrimination. Each of their settlement contains an informal caste council, known as a biradari panchayat. The panchayat acts as instrument of social control, dealing with issues such as divorce and adultery.
