= Sapuria =

Muslim community in West Bengal, India

The Sapuria (sometimes pronounced Sanpuria) are a predominantly Muslim community (there are also Hindu Sapurias) found in the state of West Bengal in India, as well as in Bangladesh. They are also known as Sanpui (often used as a surname). They fall under the Bediya community in India.

== Origin ==
The Sapuria are a community whose traditional occupation was snake charming. According to some traditions, they are converts from the Hindu Bedia caste. The Sapuria are said to have gotten their name from the Bengali word for snake which is sanp, and Sapuria literally means snake charmer. They speak a dialect of their own, but most also speak Bengali and are found mainly in the districts of Midnapore, Birbhum, Murshidabad, Howrah, Nadia and 24 Parganas. The Sapuria are also found in Bangladesh.

== Present circumstances ==
There are now two distinct sub-groups among the Sapuria, those who still practice their traditional occupation of snake charming, and a small minority who are now cultivators. Both these groups intermarry, but the community as a whole is endogamous. Many Sapuria are still nomadic, and are often employed by local peasants as snake catchers. Their encampments are usually found at the end of villages. The community has a fairly strong caste panchayat, that enforces communal rules and resolves intra-community disputes.

== See also ==
- Sapera
