= Sapera =

Sapera is a name given to the snake charmers of India. Since the introduction of the Wildlife Protection Act of 1972 the Sapera's numbers have been dwindling - what was in the thousands is now limited to only a few hundred. Their professions and their religion are slowly being 'phased out' by a law that was put in place to stop the illegal skin/fur trade.

Many Sapera practice their trade/snake handling based upon their following of the God Shiva - depicted with a Cobra.

Most of the saperas are found to be in Dehradun, Uttarakhand north part of India. But some saperas are also to be found in some parts of Bihar where they doing business from unstable places, moving here and there, and show their talents with 'saanp' snakes and earn some money.

== See also ==
- Kalbelia
- Jogi sect
