= Golla (caste) =

Social community in India

- Religions: Hinduism
- Languages: Telugu
- Country: India
- Populated states: Andhra Pradesh • Telangana • Maharashtra • Karnataka • Tamil Nadu

The Golla are a Telugu-speaking pastoral community primarily living in the Indian states of Andhra Pradesh, Maharashtra and Telangana with smaller numbers in Karnataka and Tamil Nadu. They are related to other pastoral-herding castes like Gulla, Gullar (in Karnataka), Gollewar and Gavli (in the Marathwada area of Maharashtra State) and are a part of the larger Yadav community. They are classified as an Other Backward Caste.

Gollas are traditionally cowherds, but they engage in both sheep/goat and cattle pastoralism, in that they either herd exclusively sheep, a mixed herd of sheep and goats, or cattle.

== Etymology ==
One etymology for Golla name comes from the Sanskrit "Gopala", which in North India passed through Prakrit "Gwala". Several other variants of the name exist in South India, in such forms as Gollavaru, Godlavaru, etc. There are many synonyms by which they are referred to within their community, namely Kadugolla, Oorugolla, Adivigolla, Handigolla and Gopala. Others refer to them only as Golla or Gollaru.

The Gollas also call themselves Yadava. In the early 1920s, castes such as Ahir, Gavli, Golla, Gopa and Goala, which were traditionally engaged in cattle-related occupations, started referring to themselves as Yadav/Yadava. They claimed that they were related to the Yadav of the Puranas, which were held to be synonymous and associated with Lord Krishna, a cowherd.

== Sub-castes ==
The community, due to its size, has a great number of sub-castes, including: Yerra, Mushti, Mukti, Masaram, Karine, Pakinati, Puja, Modateetta, Nallasadana, Gujarathi, Gampa, Peyya, Veyya, Kuruma and Sidda. The Kannada-speaking Hanabaru or Krishna Golla are also considered to be a sub-caste.

== History ==
The Gollas trace their genealogical links with the Yadavas. In the context of Puranic Yadava lineages, attention was drawn (Romila Thapar 1978) to a South Indian tradition, according to which eighteen Yadava (Velir) clans are believed to have migrated from the North to the Deccan around 800 B.C. under the leadership of Agastya. Then some of the medieval dynasties (c. 1200 A.D.) of Western Deccan-Rastrakutas of Malkhed, Hoyasalas of Dwarasamudram and Yadavas of Devagiri-claim Yadava descent and their contemporaries in Eastern Deccan, who ruled over some parts of Pakanadu (present day Nellore Taluq, Nellore District) and parts of Kammanadu (Ongole, Addanki and Darsi Taluks of Prakasam District) as feudatories. Telugu Chodas of Nellore and Kakatiyas of Warangal, also belonged to a branch of the Yadavas of Devagiri. These Yadava dynasties of both the Western and Eastern Deccan claimed that they belonged to the moon born lineage (Chandra Vamsa). In the late medieval and precolonial period, some lineages of Gollas emerged as powerful chieftains (Poligars) and they held sway over some parts of Rayalaseema. Some scholars believe that people of different origins are linked together by similar professions and constitute the Golla caste.

== Assimilation into Yadav community ==
In 1923, leaders from the North Indian Ahir and Maharashtraian Gavli, founded All India Yadav Mahasabha (AIYM) in order to lay claims to Yadava identity through sanskritisation of their constituents and by re-imagining a glorified past by claiming themselves to be the descendants of mythical Yadu. The AIYM insisted that all these regional castes known by different names, call themselves Yadav/Yadava and that each person have Yadav as his last name, and this was enthusiastically followed by various communities who were traditionally involved in cattle related occupations. The Gollas of Hyderabad state, under the leadership of their regional association, the Hyderabad Rashtra Yadava Mahajana Samajam, requested to the Census Commissioner for a change in their caste names Golla, Gawli, Gollawar and Ahir to Yadava. Similarly, in 1930, the government of Madras state directed the adoption of the term "Yadava", in place of Golla, Idaiyan, Gopa, Gopi or Gowla, in all official documents. This was in response to an appeal made by the Yadukula Maha Sangham of east Godavari District.

== Religion ==
Gollas are both Vaishnavites and Saivites. They put on a vertical yellow or red streak on their forehead, indicating Vaishnavism, and worship a deity, Mallanna, who is a form of Shiva. The Yerra (or Kilari Gollas) regard themselves as superior to other Gollas and put on a sacred thread during marriages.

Some Gavli (Golla) communities of Nanded Marathwada Region of Maharashtra worship Lord Virabhadra of Mukhed as their gotrapurusha and kuladevata. Some also worship Khandoba (a form of Lord Shiva).

== Social status ==
Gollas were looked upon fairly high; equally with the agricultural castes such as the Kamma, Kapu, and Balija, Gollas were allowed to intermingle with these castes. The Gollas are classified as Other Backward Class (OBC) in the Indian System of Reservation.

== Tirumala Tirupati Devasthanams ==
- In June 2020, Andhra Pradesh state government restored 'Golla Mirasi', also known as 'Golla Mandapam', the hereditary rights of the Golla community pertaining to certain rituals at Tirumala temple.

== See also ==
- Gollewar
- Gavli
- Yadava
- Naidu
