= Sapera (Muslim) =

Community in the Indian state of Bihar

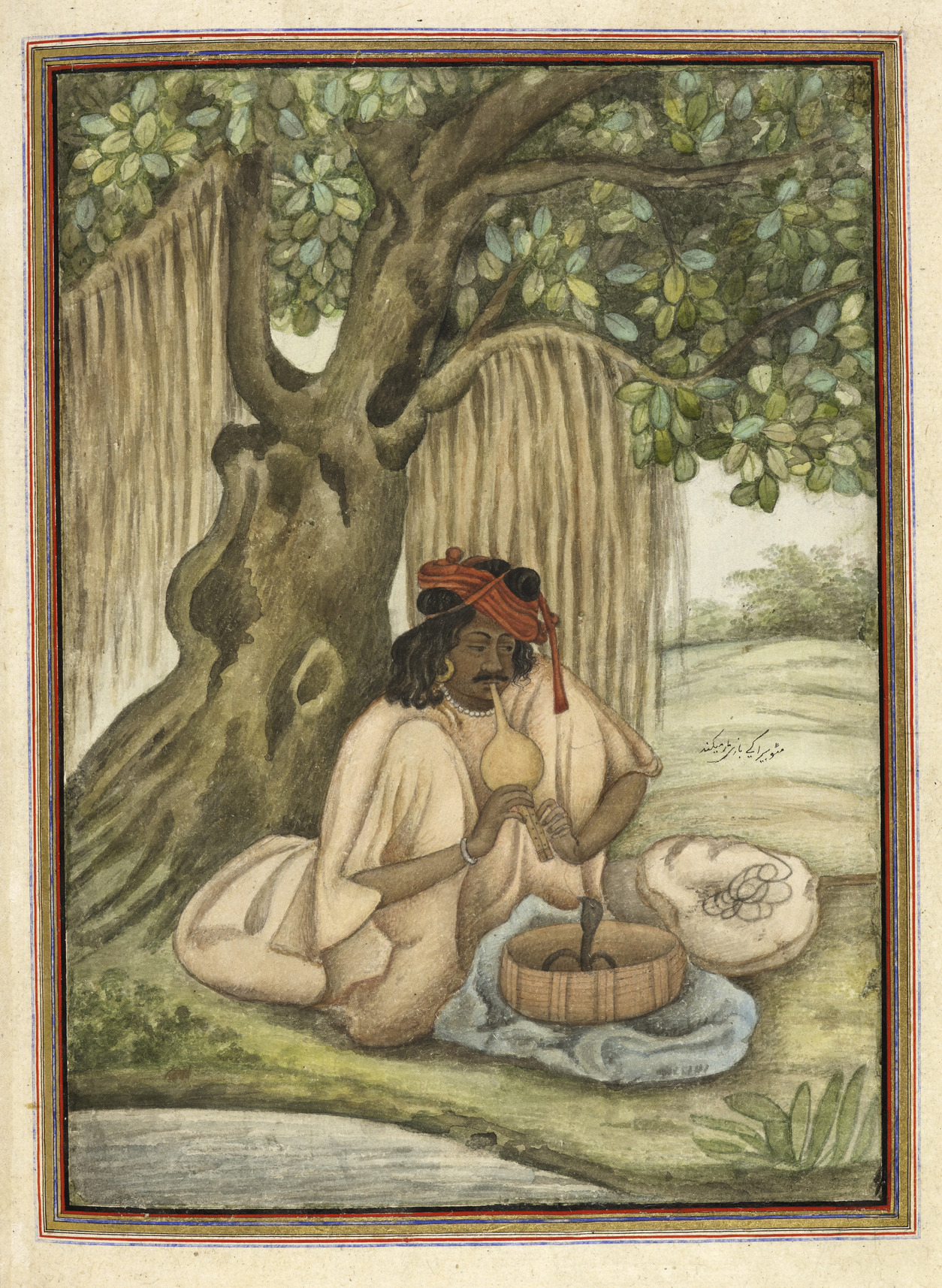
A snake-charmer of the Sapera caste - Tashrih al-aqvam (1825)

The Sapera are a Muslim community found in the northern part of the state of Bihar in India. They are also known as Mastan and Ustad.

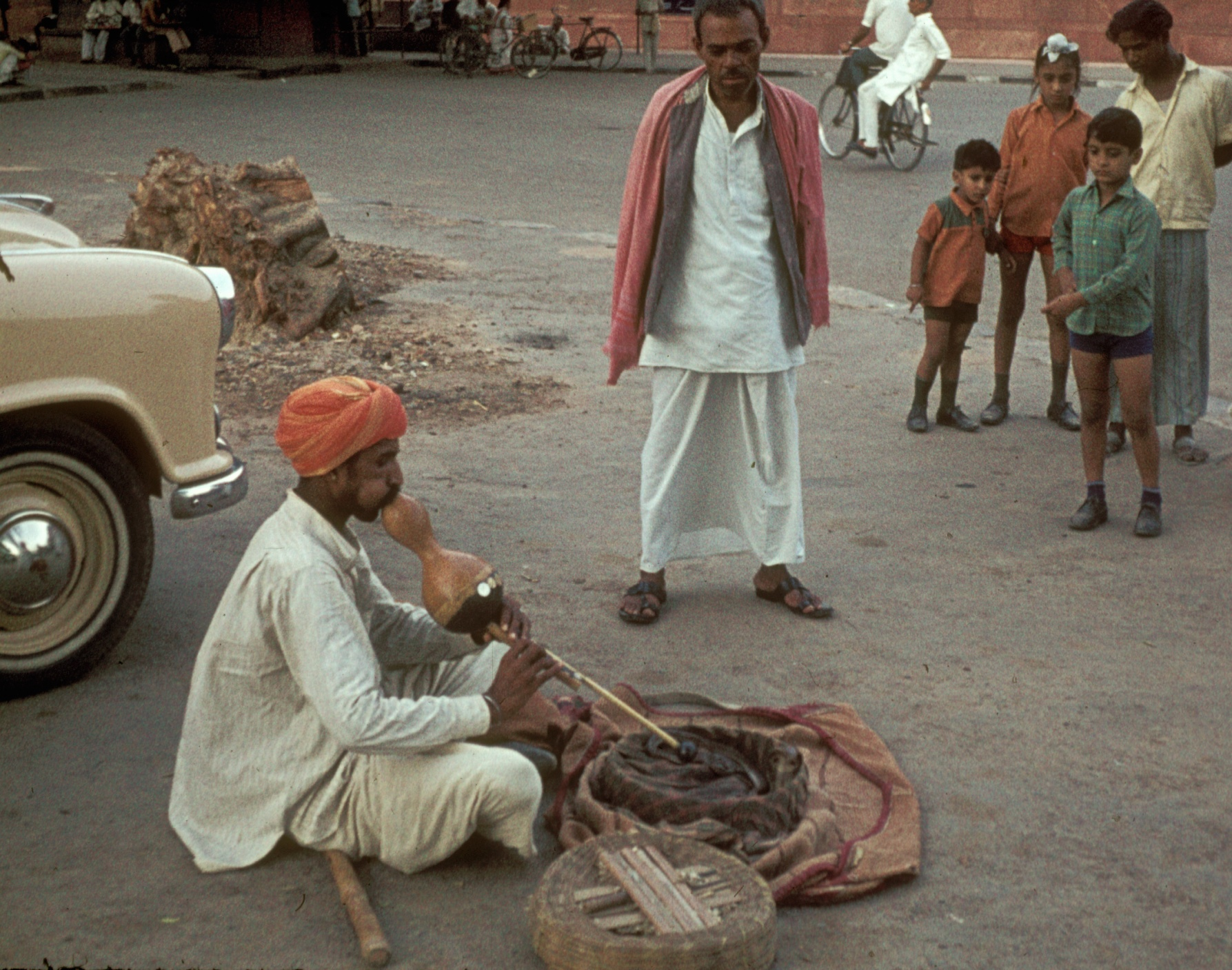
A snake charmer in Delhi

== See also ==
- Sapera dance
- Sapera
