= Lodha people =

Tribal group of West Bengal and Odisha

Lodha

Regions with significant populations
- West Bengal: 108,707 (Note: The Lodha tribe primarily inhabits in undivided Paschim Medinipur and Mayurbhanj, with populations of 51,772 and 5,523 respectively, according to the 2011 Census. Linguistically, they lack a distinct mother tongue and typically speak Bengali or Odia. Their total population is recorded as 108,707 in West Bengal and 9,785 in Odisha. The elevated figure in West Bengal includes the Kharia tribe, who are not separately recognised as a Scheduled Tribe and are listed alongside the Lodha. A large number of Kharia migrated to West Bengal, particularly to Jalpaiguri, where they number 34,481, including 3,180 Kharia speakers and 29,004 Sadri speakers.)
- Odisha: 9,785

Languages
- Lodhi, Bengali, Odia, Kharia, Sadri

Religion
- Hinduism, Islam

Related ethnic groups
- Munda, Lodha Muslims, Sabar, Kharia

The Lodha people (often honorifically Sabar and Savar) are a Scheduled Tribe and particularly vulnerable tribal group of India, inhabiting primarily West Bengal and Odisha. Lodhas of West Bengal mostly live in the Paschim Medinipur and Jhargham districts. A section of the Lodha has converted to Islam, and formed a distinct community called the Lodha Muslims.

== Demographics ==
As per 2001 census, Lodhas numbered 84,966 and formed 1.9 per cent of the scheduled tribe population of West Bengal. They had a literacy rate of 34.8 per cent. As per the 2011 census, the Lodhas population is 108,707 and 9,785 in West Bengal and Odisha respectively.

Historical number of Lodha tribe
Census year	West Bengal	±%	Odisha	±%
1901	8,173			—
1911	7,403			—
1921	n/a			—
1931	11,001	—	n/a	—
1941	11,641	5.8	n/a	—
1951	8,346	-28.4	n/a	—
1961	40,898	390.7	2,370	—
1971	45,906	12.2	3,891	64.2
1981	53,718	17.0	5,100	31.1
1991	68,095	26.8	7,458	46.2
2001	84,966	24.7	8,905	19.4
2011	108,707	27.9	9,785	9.9

The Lodhas of Odisha are primarily found in Suliapada and Morada blocks of Baripada sub-division of Mayurbhanj district of Orissa.

Religions of Lodhas (census 2011)
1. Hinduism (86.6%)
2. Christianity (12.1%)
3. Sarna (0.83%)
4. Islam (0.23%)
5. Sari Dharma (0.06%)
6. Religion not stated (0.15%)
7. Other (0.09%)
Languages spoken by Lodhas (census 2011)
1. Bengali (57.6%)
2. Sadan/Sadri (26.5%)
3. Kharia (6.59%)
4. Odia (5.51%)
5. Santali (0.71%)
6. Hindi (0.63%)
7. Kurukh/Oraon (0.36%)
8. Savara (0.27%)
9. Other (1.79%)

== Focus ==
Lodha means piece of flesh named after their ancestor. Lodhas have been in the focus of anthropologists and social activists. During the early period of their rule, the British government in India oppressed the tribal people of Jungle Mahals, who were traditionally dependent upon the forests for a living. They had revolted but were ruthlessly suppressed. Having been deprived of their livelihood and without any alternatives, they took to criminal ways of life and were subsequently branded a criminal tribe. They should properly be labelled as uprooted rebels. Lodha titles are Nayek, Mallick, Digar, Sardar, Bhokta, Kotal, Dandapat, Bhunya etc. These titles were also used by the Sabars. One of the most important research on the Lodhas was done by a Calcutta University faculty, Prabodh Kumar Bhowmick. Much later, researchers from the Department of Anthropology at Vidyasagar University have done empirical studies on the development scenario of the Lodha tribe in Mendinpur district who were by that time declared as a 'Primitive Tribal Group' (PTG) by the Government of India.

== See also ==
- Chuni Kotal
