= Kela (tribe) =

Muslim community in West Bengal, India

The Kela are a Muslim community found in the state of West Bengal in India. They are also known as Kharia Muslim.

== Origin ==
The Kela are a hunting and gathering community found in the district of Midnapore. They were traditionally involved in the catching of snakes, toads and birds, a profession considered derogatory by neighbouring communities. The word Kela has been derived from the word kala, which means unclean in Bengali. They are also known as Kharia Muslims, as they are said to be converts from the Kharia caste, and prefer to be known as Kharia.

== Present circumstances ==
The Kela have now entirely given up their traditional occupation, and the majority are now marginal farmers or sharecroppers. A significant minority are also involved in repairing locks, and now suitcases. The community is strictly endogamous, and marry close kin. They live in multi-caste villages, but occupy their distinct quarters, known as paras. The community are Sunni Muslims and speak Bengali language.

== See also ==
- Lodha Muslims
