= Gavli =

Sub caste of Yadav in Maharashtra

Gavli (also spelled as Gawli or Gavali) (Marathi: गवळी) is a Hindu caste in the Indian states of Maharashtra and Madhya Pradesh. They are a part of the Yadav community.

== Etymology ==
The name Gavli may have been derived from a Sanskrit word meaning cow.

== History ==
=== Origin ===
Some authorities have suggested that Ahirs (today Yadavs) migrated to Maharashtra from Punjab and Sindh in early historic times. Other researchers have hypothesized that these people have inhabited Maharashtra for the last 5,000 to 10,000 years.

Gavli are distributed all over Maharashtra. Although a has classified Gawlis as sub-caste of many different castes Ahir Gawli (sub-caste of famous Yadav caste of North India) whereas Hanbar Gawli, Singaji Gawli and Lingayat Gawli are different from Yadav-Ahir Gawli. Along with Maratha and Kunbis, Ahir Gawlis are considered one of the allied castes of Maratha caste and have been included in the Maratha Regiment in the past.

== Relationship with Deccan Yadavas ==
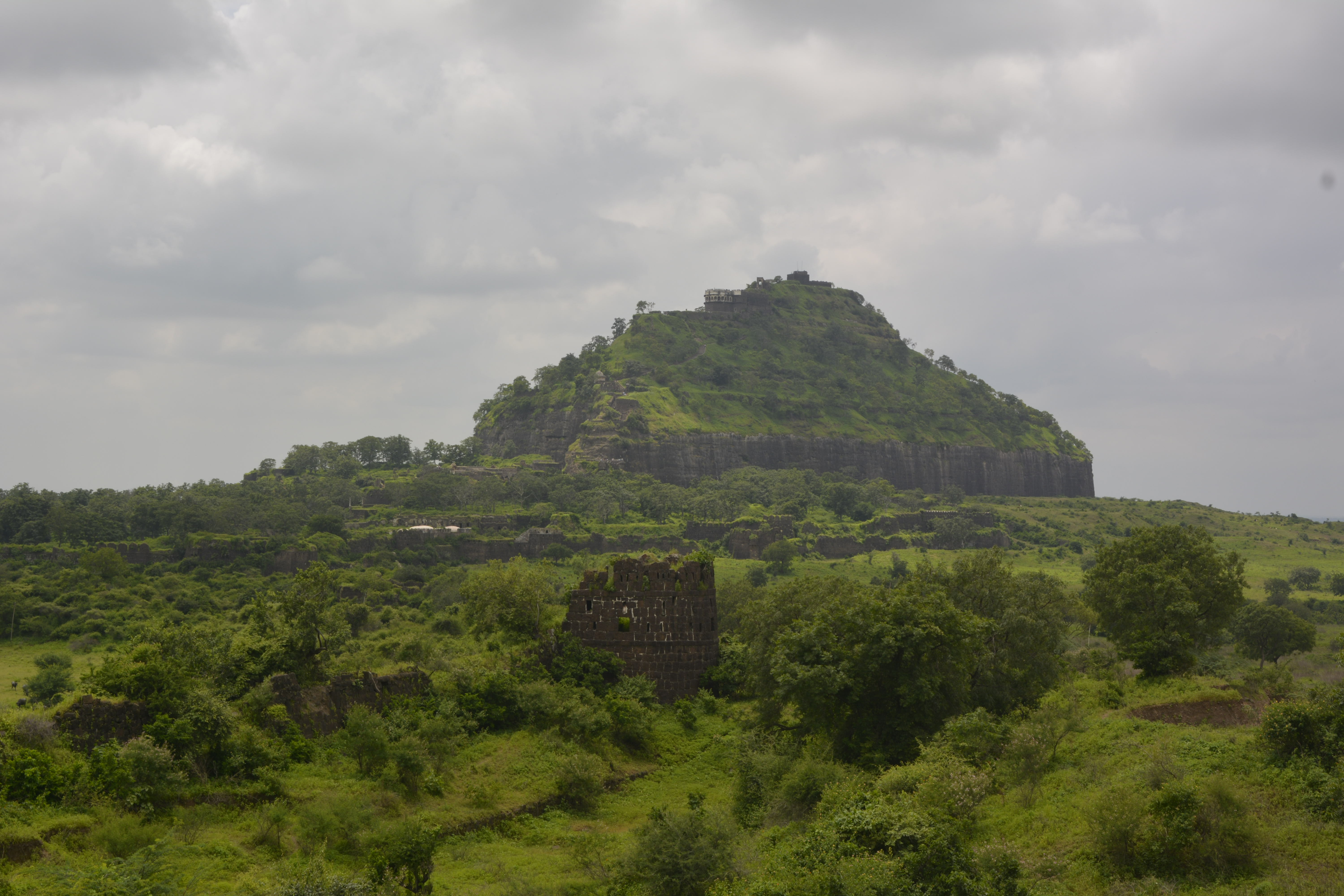
The hill of Devagiri, the capital of Yadavas

The Seuna Yadava dynasty, which ruled present-day Maharashtra and north Karnataka, arose out of the valorous deeds of Dridhaprahara, founder of the dynasty, who protected cattle. According to the traditional sources, Devagiri, the capital of Seuna Yadavas, was founded by a king who was a Golla/Gavli. The idea that the Seunas were a Gavli dynasty survives to this day in folk traditions of the Nashik-Khandesh area, where they are traditionally called "Gavli Kings". During the reign of Seuna Yadavas and their rival Hoysala Yadavas, the temple of Vitthal at Pandharpur, under their purview, grew from a small pastoral deity site to a major temple complex.
