= Gaderia =

Juice trademark

GADERIA
- Founded: 2022
- Founder: Mykhailo Kupranets
- Products: apples, fruit and vegetable juices, vinegar
- Parent: Limited Liability Company “Lvivskyi Sad”
- Website: https://gaderia.com.ua/

GADERIA is a trademark of apples, fruit and vegetable juices and vinegar registered in 2022 on the basis of the production facilities of the Limited Liability Company “Lvivskyi Sad”.

== History ==
In 2022, Mykhailo Kupranets, the owner of “Lvivskyi Sad”, launched the production line of apple-processing and founded GADERIA trademark.

In 2023, the line for the NFC natural juices production was launched under the same GADERIA trademark. The production capacity of the line allows to produce up to 100,000 liters per month. Juices of this trademark are positioned in Ukraine as eco-products, and are exported to Great Britain, Austria and the Baltic countries.

GADERIA holds Global G.A.P. and ISO 22000 certificates.

== Product ==
The Gaderia trademark offers a wide range of products. In particular, juices:

- NFC apple juice,
- NFC apple and pear juice,
- NFC apple and carrot juice,
- NFC apple and strawberry juice,
- NFC apple and grape juice.

The product is sold in packaging types from 0.3 liters to 10 liters.

In 2024, the line with a production capacity of 5,000 liters per month preservative-free natural apple vinegar was launched under the GADERIA trademark. By the end of 2024, it is planned to release the line of own-produced balsamic vinegars of apple, blueberry and raspberry flavors having been aged in oak barrels for at least 6 months.
