= Kan (tribe) =

Indo-Aryan Muslim community

কান; খলিফা

Regions with significant populations
- Bangladesh (Faridpur District Khulna District); West Bengal (Malda division, Presidency division)

Languages
- Bengali (Eastern Bengali, Central Bengali)

Religion
- Sunni Islam

Related ethnic groups
- Domba, Other Bengalis

The Kan (Bengali: কান), also known as Khalifa (Bengali: খলিফা, romanized: Khôlifa), are a Bengali Muslim community native to Bangladesh and the Indian state of West Bengal.

== Origin ==
The Kan, a small Muslim community, were traditionally involved in the repairing of umbrellas. According to traditions, the Kan were originally members of the Dom community who converted to Islam. In addition to repairing umbrellas, the community is also involved in the manufacture of fishhooks. The community is found mainly in the districts of Murshidabad, 24 Parganas and Nadia in West Bengal and Faridpur District in Bangladesh.

== Present circumstances ==
The Kan are still involved in the traditional occupation of umbrella repairing, and during the chaitra or rainy season, the community entirely devotes itself to the construction and repairing of umbrellas. This season lasts for almost six months, while for the remaining six months the community is involved in daily wage labour. A significant number of the community are now cultivators. They grow mainly paddy and wheat.

The Kan occupy distinct quarters in villages known as a paras. Each of these settlements contains an informal caste council known as a panchayat, which acts as an instrument of social control. The community are strictly endogamous, and marry close kin.

== See also ==
- Domba
