= Dharhi =

Muslim community in Uttar Pradesh, India

The Dharhi are a community of wandering singers and musicians in Uttar Pradesh, India. Most are Muslims.
