= Boria (caste) =

Indian caste

Baurasi/Pasi
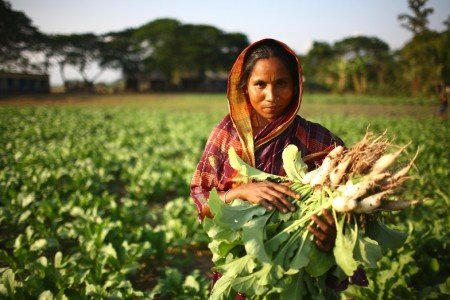
- A Baurasi woman harvesting radish in northern India

Regions with significant populations
- India

Languages
- Hindi

Religion
- Hinduism, Buddhism, Shivism

Related ethnic groups
- Pasi

The Boria, also known as Baurasi, are a Hindu caste found in North India. Those in Uttar Pradesh have scheduled caste status.

== Origin ==
The Boriya are a sub-group of the Pasi community. Although of Pasi origin, the two communities are now quite distinct and do not intermarry. They are found mainly in the Awadh region, mainly in the districts of Gonda, Faizabad, and Barabanki. The Boria speak the Awadhi dialect.

== History ==
The Pasi are endogamous and in their native places in Uttar Pradesh and Bihar their sub-groups are also endogamous but here in Nagpur only three, namely, the Baurasi, Kaithwas, and Gujar sub-groups are found, who have migrated from Uttar Pradesh and Bihar. The Baurasi Pasi are locally known as Bahoriia which is used as their surname. They are reported to have higher social status and are economically well off. The other two sub-groups in the social hierarchy are the Kaithwas and the Gujar. They do not have surnames in their native place but they have adopted various surnames such as Baharla, Gujar, etc., which are in fact their sub- caste names. They also have titles like. Choudhury Vikal, Raahi etc. The sub-castes were endogamous initially, but later on due to non-availability of suitable spouses in their own sub-caste locally and the involvement of big expenditure in bringing a wife from the native place, the three sub-groups have started inter-marrying with each other. They consider themselves to be Kshatriyas in the varna order but in their native villages they were considered to be shudras.

== Present circumstances ==
The Boria are a strictly endogamous community, and prefer marrying close kin. Most Baria belong to the Kabirpanthi sect.

The Boria are mainly a community of landowners and cultivators. They grow wheat and pulses, with animal husbandry being an important secondary occupation. Historically, the community were mainly tenant farmers, working on land owned by Rajputs and Banias. They live in multi-caste and multi-religious villages, but occupy their own quarters. Each of their settlement contains an informal caste council, known as a biradari panchayat. The panchayat acts as an instrument of social control, dealing with issues such as divorce and adultery.

The 2011 Census of India for Uttar Pradesh showed the Boria population as 4558.
