= Aheria =

Indian caste

The Aheria are one of the nomadic hunter and gatherer caste of North India, found in Haryana and Rajasthan. Despite being considered as Shudras, they were not considered as untouchables and were allowed to have food in functions. They are a homogeneous and endogamous community with their own Panchayats.

They are recognized as Scheduled Castes in the state of Delhi, Haryana and Rajasthan.
