= Patharkat =

Hindu sub-caste

The Patharkatt are a scheduled tribe found in Indian states & Nepal states . They are found in Uttar Pradesh and Bihar of India but they are not listed by Indian government although they are originating in India not Pakistan. They are also known as Sangtarash, Girihara or Gihara,Santaras,Santaraj, Kushwadiya, Dhungana, Patharphor Kshetri etc.

== Origin ==
The Patharkatt are not a sub-group of the larger kanjar caste. Their name Patharkatt in Bhojpuri literally means stone cutters. Having taken up the profession of stone cutting. They are found mainly in Awadh and their concentrations are in the districts of Sitapur, Unnao, Raebareli,Hardoi and Lucknow. In Lucknow, they are found mainly in the localities of Qaisar Bagh, Saafatgang, Daligang, Bangla Bazar, Nishatgang, Lal Kuan and Chinhat. They speak Patharkatt or Girihara Language among themselves and Bhojpuri with outsiders.

In Bihar, the Patharkatt are found in the districts of Champaran, Arrah and Gaya, India|Gaya. They are divided into five exogamous clans, the Sankat, Soda, Bhains, Maraiya and Untawar. The Patharkatt claim to have come from mountain area of India thousands hundred years ago.

== Present circumstances ==
The Patharkatt are endogamous, but avoid marrying among close, but they have no system of exogamous clans. They are largely a landless and urban community, and their traditional occupation remains the manufacturing of the Sil Batta . The Patharkatt now buys stones from quarries in western Uttar Pradesh, and then engrave and cut the stones. A few Patharkatt have abandoned their traditional occupation and taken to wage labour. The Indian government has not given them scheduled caste under any caste status, which did not allow them to access affirmative action programmes. They are traditionally Aadivasi Janjati and their customs are similar to other indigenous caste.

The Bihar Patharkatt are a nomadic community, and many are employed in quaries. They move from place to place, and live in ecampments at the edges of towns. The Patharkatt are strictly endogamous, and practice clan exogamy. They are almost totally illiterate, and are one of the most deprived community in Bihar.
