= Mirasi =

Community in North India and Pakistan

میراثی; मीरासी; مراثی; ਮਰਾਸੀ
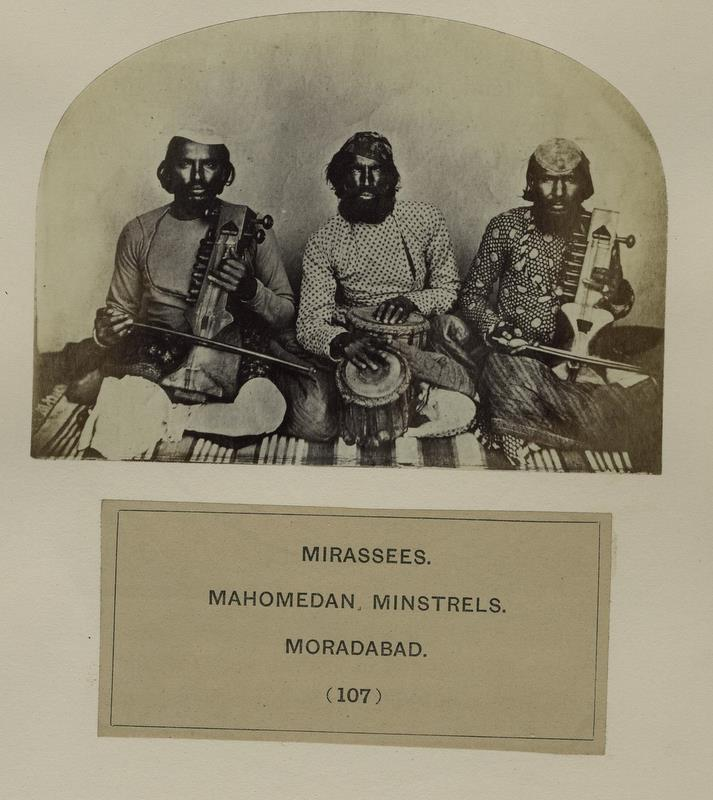

Regions with significant populations
- India; Pakistan

Languages
- Urdu; Punjabi; Rajasthani

Religion
- Islam; Sikhism; Hinduism

The Mirasi (Urdu: میراثی; Hindi: मीरासी, romanized: Mīrāsī; Punjabi: مراثی (Shahmukhi), ਮਰਾਸੀ (Gurmukhi), romanized: Marāsī) are a community found in North India and Pakistan. They are folklore tellers and traditional singers and dancers of a number of communities. The word "mirasi" is derived from the Arabic word (ميراث) mīrās, which means inheritance or sometimes heritage. In the strict grammatical sense of the term, they are considered to be propagators of the cultural and social heritage.

== History and origin ==
=== In North India ===
Some Mirasi are also known as Pakhwaji due to the pakhwaj, a timbrel that they play.

=== In Delhi ===
The Mirasi of Delhi claim descent from the Charanas. The Charanas are said to have converted to Islam during early Mughal rule and were also associated with Amir Khusrau.

=== In Punjab ===
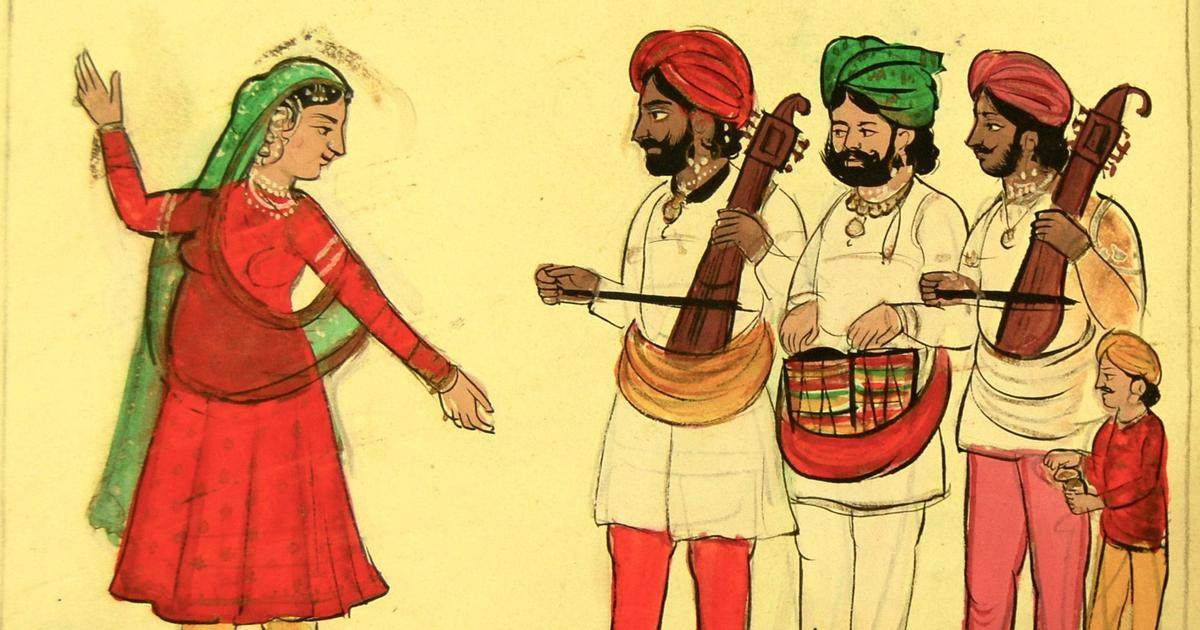
'Dancing Girl with Musicians', Lahore, ca.1890s

The Mirasi of Punjab were under the patronage of the Sikh Empire during the reign of Maharaja Ranjit Singh. They acted as hereditary bards, genealogists, and musicians. They performed at folk, qawwali, gurbani, melas at Sufi spaces in that period. Traditional lore, such as Heer Ranjha in the Bhairavi raga, were performed musically. Ragadari (raga) was evoked and employed by the Punjabi Mirasi, even if they lacked the precise technical knowledge of it. Female Mirasi performers were known as "mirasans". The performers at the shrine of Mian Bibi were traditionally Mirasi women, whom used "obscure" ragas. The Mirasi exercised complex Indic musical modes and metres, such as "complex meend, gamak and quicksilver khatkas". Since they had no elite education in Indic musical tradition, they used colloquial language to refer to these complex metres and modes they made use of, such as by referring it as "machhi mar katan" ('bird swooping down on fish').

After Punjab was annexed into the British Empire, the new European colonial overlords held disdain for the Mirasi tradition of musical performance and likened it to being "ugly, screaming, filthy, disreputable and rapacious". Victorian moralism brought by the colonials began a dismantling and vilification of the mirasi tradition, with a new, coming-of-age anglicized Indian elite class siding with their British overlords in their views of the mirasi. Thus began the anti-nautch reforms that sought to bring an end to the mirasi-courtesan culture. The music of Punjab was attempted to be "purified" by groups such as the Arya Samaj and Deva Samaj. Mirasis, dhadis, and nautch performers became targets in this supposedly moralist reform. However, the princely states of Patiala and Kapurthala still gave patronage to these traditional performers, which helped ensure the passing down of their traditions. Recently, newer generations of Mirasi have sought to revive their arts to their pre-colonial state.

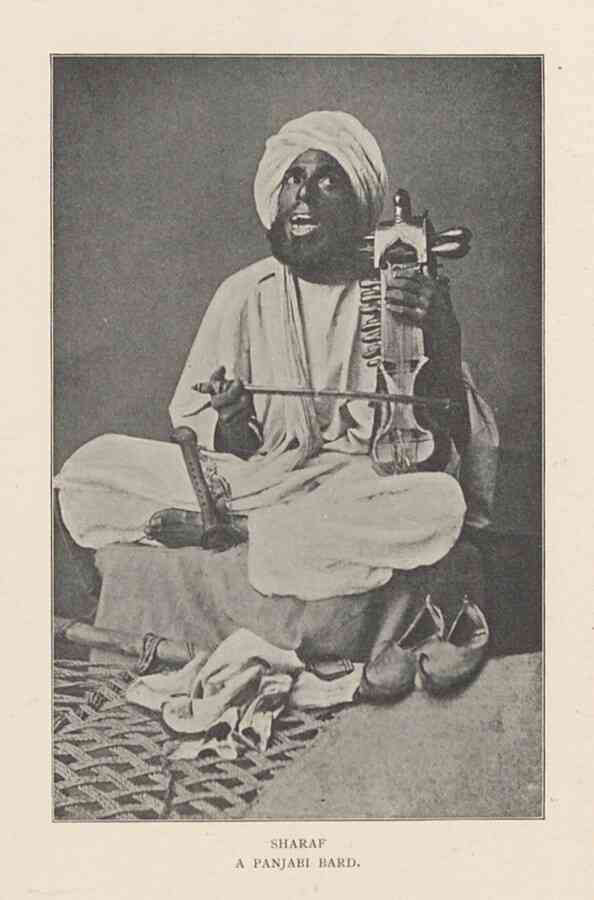
Sharaf, a Punjabi bard or mirasi, 1903

==== Major sub-groups ====
The Mir Mirasi are said to have got their name as they were the wealthy inhabitants of the city of Ludhiana. They had a lot of villages Their sub-division, the Dhadi are Sikh, and their heredity occupation was singing praises of Sikh heroes.

==== Pakistani Punjab ====
In Pakistani Punjab, the Mirasi are now mainly a community who participate in aashura activities recites nohas (mersaya), also they are good entertainers having provided many of the country's singers theater artists. Most Mirasi are now bilingual, speaking both Urdu and Punjabi. They are found throughout Punjab, and most villages contain their settlements. Some 'mirasis' in Northern and Central Punjab now call themselves as 'Khans.

== See also ==
- Punjabi folklore
