= Sapera (Hindu) =

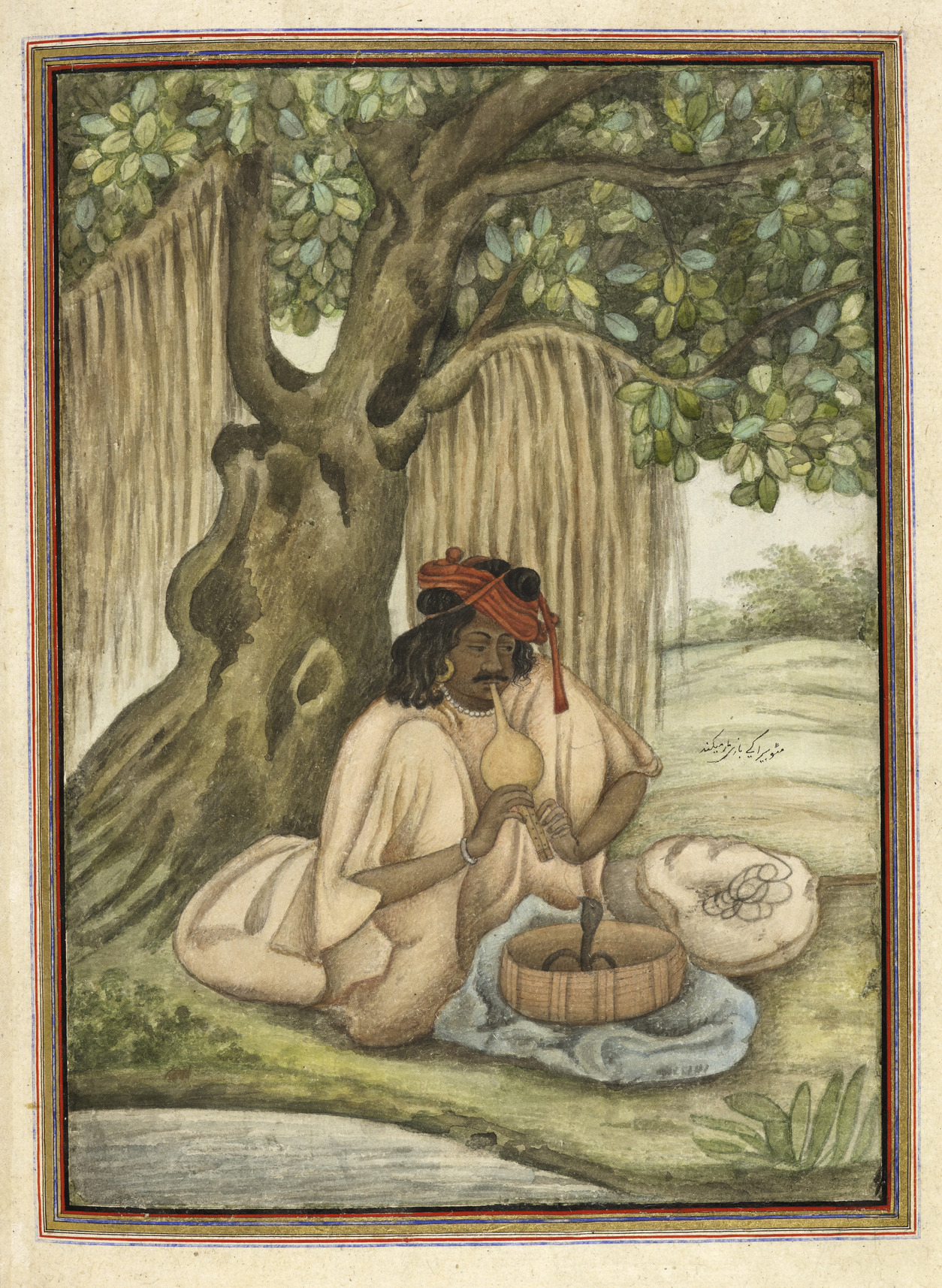
A snake-charmer of the Sapera caste - Tashrih al-aqvam (1825)

The Sapera are a Hindu caste found in North India. They are also known as Barwa Sampheriya in West Bengal, Sapela in Punjab and Sapera in Madhya Pradesh.

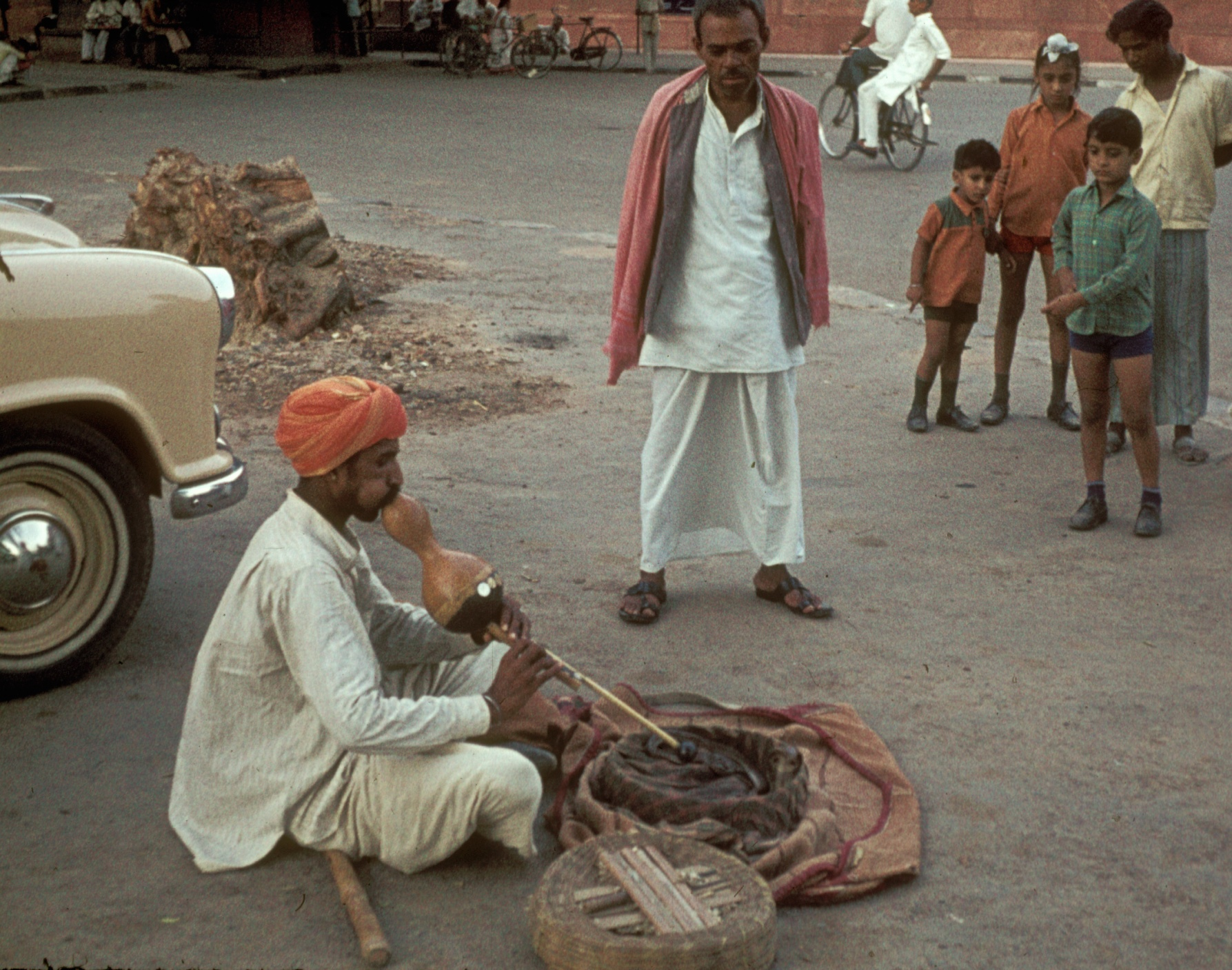
A snake charmer in Delhi

== Origin ==
They are a community of snake charmers and one of a number of semi-nomadic communities found in North India which live in camps on the outskirts of most North Indian towns.

In Haryana, the community is known as the Sapera Nath. They are further divided into ten sub-groups, some of which are the Brahmin Sapera, Jhinwar Sapera, Soggar Sapera, Bihal Sapera, Nakphule Sapera, and Sandenath Sapera. These divisions are said to reflect the diverse origin of this community, where people of different caste backgrounds took to the occupation of snake charming, and over time evolved into a distinct community. They now have Scheduled Caste status in Haryana.

In Punjab, the word Sapela is derived from the word sap, which means snake in Punjabi. They are also known as Nath. The community are as much snake catchers as snake charmers, and are employed by villagers as snake charmers. According to their traditions, the community descend from a Kanipa, a Jhinwar, who took to snake charming. They are nomadic, and are possibly of Dom origin. The Punjab Sapela speak Punjabi and are found throughout the state.

== Present circumstances ==
The Sapera are divided into two endogamous groups, the Saharpua and the Baiga in Uttar Pradesh, especially the Bareilly district. These are further segmented into exogamous clans, and they maintain a strict system of clan exogamy. The principal occupation of the Sapera remains snake charming, and they wander from village to village, performing with deadly snakes like cobras. They are also expert snake catchers, and are often called in by other villagers to catch snakes and remove the poison from persons bitten by snakes. A small number of Sapera have also been involved in the manufacture of a coarse rope called the munj. As with other nomadic groups, the Indian state has exerted pressure for them to settle down. A few have now taken up permanent settlement and are mainly sharecroppers. They remain an extremely marginalised group, suffering from poverty.

The Sapela community in Punjab consists of a number of clans, the main ones being the Marar, Goar, Bhambi, Doom and Ladhu. All these clans are of equal status and intermarry. The Sapela are still largely involved in their traditional occupation of snake charming and snake catching, as well as collecting wild root and tubers, which they use for medicinal purposes. They are nomadic are often employed in the villages to catch snakes. The community are also associated with the playing the gourd pipe, known as a been. Like other Sapera groups, they are extremely marginalised, and have been granted Scheduled Caste status.

== See also ==
- Kalbelia
- Nomadic tribes in India
- Nomads of India
- Scheduled Castes and Scheduled Tribes
- List of Scheduled Tribes in India
- Sapera (Muslim)
