= Bazigar people =

Schedule caste found in Central India

Bazigar (from Persian: بازیگر bazi + gar), or Goaars, are an ethnic group of north-western India. They are primarily found in India's Punjab and in Pakistan's Punjab, but there are also communities in Haryana, Uttar Pradesh, Delhi, Chandigarh, Himachal Pradesh, Jammu and Kashmir, and Rajasthan. They were previously nomadic with their main occupation the performance of acrobatics and other forms of entertainment, but they are now settled and engaged mainly in agricultural and similar forms of labour.

== Origin ==
According to Oral tradition the caste of Bazigar are believed to be originated from the intermingling between the Untouchable and Lodhi Rajput women, formerly profound as an dancing lady for the adulated members of Jat community. Over the time, they have come to assimilate themselves with the status of the Chauhan clan within the Bhangi community. They have now been granted Scheduled Caste status in Haryana, Punjab and Uttar Pradesh. The Bazigar speak their own dialect, known as Bazigar, while speaking in Hindi with outsiders. In Haryana, they are found mainly in the districts of Yamuna Nagar, Ambala, Kurukshetra, Rohtak, Sirsa, Fatehabad, Karnal. Major Bazigar clans in Haryan include the Kanaut, Vartia, Lalka, Machhal Myane, Dharmsout, Manana, Namsout, and Jagateka.

In Punjab, the Bazigar have Scheduled Caste status. They are found throughout Punjab, but in terms of numbers, they are concentrated in Patiala, Sangrur, and Bathinda districts are centres of this tribe. The Bazigar are a nomadic tribe, who go about from village to village practising acrobatic feats. Their primary occupation was the performance of acrobatics. Generally, each family was allocated twelve villages, and the Bazigar were paid by the villagers to entertain them. Many Bazigar were also employed as seasonal agricultural laborers. With the increase in televisions in rural Punjab, the Bazigar's traditional occupation is under threat.

The Bazigar are further sub-divided into Six sub-groups, the guriyaka, Jogi, Badtia (Wartia), Muchhal (muchhals), Jassuke, Dharamsot and Namsout. The first four sub-divisions cannot intermarry, but Namsout only marry within the clan. Historically, the Bazigar were either Hindu or Muslim, but with the departure of their Muslim patrons due to the partition, the Bazigar have embraced Sikhism. They have also abandoned their traditional dialect Bazigar boli for standard Punjabi.

== Bibliography ==
- Deb, P. C. (1987). Bazigars of Punjab: A Socio-economic Study. Delhi: Mittal Publications.
- Schreffler, Gibb (2011). "The Bazigar (Goaar) People and Their Performing Arts" (PDF). Journal of Punjab Studies. 18 (1&2).
- Singh, Birinder Pal, ed. (2010). "Criminal" Tribes of Punjab: A Social-anthropological Inquiry. Routledge. ISBN 9780415551472.
