= Scheduled castes in Punjab =

Scheduled castes in Punjab, or Dalits in Punjab, are the officially designated groups in Punjab state in India and Punjab province in Pakistan which are most disadvantaged due to the caste system. They were placed in the lowest ranks of the caste system, because of which they suffered and are still suffering from social, political, economic and personal discrimination. In present-day Punjab, India, the scheduled caste population is proportionally higher than most other Indian states.

== Terminology ==
These groups were historically known as Dalits but in 1935, the term "Scheduled Castes" came to replace this term in official terminology with the passing of the Government of India Act, 1935. The British termed certain nomadic tribes of the region as "vagrant and criminal tribes", with this term being replaced by "ex-criminal tribes" after 1947, which was itself changed to "de-notified tribes".

== Manifestation of caste in Punjab ==
Whilst the caste system is seen as being an ancient, pan-Indian custom of the subcontinent that did not alter much until the arrival of the British colonists, in-reality the caste system functioned differently based upon region and was also practiced by members of many religions, despite being associated with Hinduism. In different regions, relations between the varying caste groupings differed, with there not being as much focus on notions of purity and pollution in some places despite common conceptions, with this also being the case in Punjab. Satish Saberwal (1976) stated that the lowest castes of Punjab did not suffer from the same level of ritual purity notions as seen elsewhere in India.

The caste system in Punjab was not as strong of an influence on interpersonal and communal relations when compared to other regions of the subcontinent, particularly amongst the Sikhs. Historically as a result, the lower castes of Punjab suffered from politico-economic handicaps rather than engrained socio-cultural religious norms, such as untouchability, as had been the case elsewhere in the subcontinent, with this distinction also being recognized by contemporary writers of the British colonial-period, with the lack of high-status attached to the Brahmin caste being seen in Punjab. Thus, the British-era writers compared the caste system in Punjab as being more akin to the class-system of Europe or even that it is an exception to the caste-system seen elsewhere in the subcontinent.

According to Joyce Pettigrew (1975), the caste-system of rural Punjab differs from "Hindu India" due to the influence of Sikhism, with there being more focus on family-units and its associated values related to pride, reputation, honour, shame, insult, and equality, rather than ritual purity and pollution. Thus, social and political bonds in Punjab centered around familial-units rather than caste. Paul Hershman (1981) disagrees with the former views and instead claims ritual pollution and purity were prevalent in Punjabi society and that Punjabi castes did not function as classes, as had been suggested by earlier, colonial observers. Regardless, caste divisions are still observed amongst the Sikhs and Surinder Singh Jodhka claims concepts of ritual purity, pollution, and exclusion also exist in Punjab (albeit at a diminished level) amongst Hindus and Sikhs, despite the caste hierarchies of the region being differently structured from the rest of India. I. P. Singh notes that the Sikhs were more readily able to accept caste equality due to them feeling that caste-based discrimination was not religiously sanctioned by their religion's tenets. One notable quirk found in Punjab is the lack of higher-status accorded to Brahmins, which is also reflected in the local language, as the word Bahman (Brahmin) in Punjabi carries a pejorative association, with the word Pandat (Pandit) being used instead to refer to a Brahmin respectfully. Thus, the Punjabi caste system lacks the strict varna hierarchies seen in other regions due to the weaker influence of Brahminism.

In rural-life, inhabitants of a village were divided into two clusters: Sardars (upper castes, consisting of Jats, Kambohs, Tarkhans, Kumhars, Sunars, and Nais), with the Jats viewing themselves as the highest-group, and "Mazhabis" (lower castes). Upper castes of the village would interact freely with one another whilst the "Mazhabis" would reside in a walled-off section of the village, with their treatment by the upper caste members varying by individual although they were communally secluded at social events and in-regards to water resources. The Jats were the landowners and the Mazhabis would work the land, with the Jat being viewed as the patron, including during visits to a Mazhabi's house. However, not all of the upper castes would treat the lower castes in a discriminatory manner, some individuals treated them equally, especially in religious settings.

Despite the seemingly less-engrained caste system in Punjab, the Scheduled Castes of the state have not improved their socio-economic indicators when compared to the rest of the population, even when compared to other Indian states.

== History ==
=== Early history ===
The caste system in Punjab has been influenced by Islam (especially Sufism) and Sikhism. Sikhism influenced the nature of the caste system's operation in the Punjab region, where the religion was founded, as Guru Nanak had rejected the Brahminical orthodoxy and structured social-hierarchies that had been prevalent, instead seeing all humans as equal to the Divine, despite their caste-background. Guru Nanak opposed caste-linked beliefs and practices regarding birth and death, rituals, asceticism, idolatry, and hermitage, instead advocating for involvement in society rather than shunning it. The Sikh practices of Langar (communal kitchen) and Kirtan (communal singing) helped to erode caste seclusions prevalent in society. Sanskrit was not given preference over the prevailing language of the commonfolk, with Gurmukhi being adopted as a script for Punjabi. The Ād Granth was compiled by the fifth guru, which features works composed by members of Shudra-designated caste-groupings, such as Kabir (weaver), Dhanna (Jat), and Namdev (tailor), and untouchables, namely Ravidas (cobbler), Sadhna (butcher), and Sain (barber), and Muslim saints, namely Farid and Bhikan. The inaugural quintent of the Panj Piare institution in 1699 also consisted of four Shudras.

=== Colonial period ===
Before 1857, even though Dalits served as leather workers, sweepers and scavengers, butchers and performed menial duties in the British cantonments and under the British army, they were not recruited as soldiers. But after the 1857 war of independence, this began to change. Due to the shortage of soldiers from the so-called 'upper castes', British began to recruit Dalits as soldiers. They raised a regiment of Mazhabis and Ramdasias in Punjab. After some training, they sent them to fight against rebel soldiers in Delhi and Uttar Pradesh. They had also raised Dalit regiments (Mehtar Regiment) in Hindi speaking areas, which were disbanded after the war, but the Mazhabi-Ramdasia regiment was allowed to continue.

In 1900, the Punjab Land Alienation Act was passed, which had the unintended consequence of depriving Dalits the right to own land, because they were officially not considered an 'agricultural caste' by the British government.

Views toward caste in Punjab have changed throughout the 20th century, with a main reason being the various social movements of the era. Christian missionaries began converting the lower-castes of Punjab to Christianity beginning in the 1870s, with the first untouchable named Ditt becoming a Christian in 1873 at Sialkot. Hundreds of thousands of Punjabis would convert to Christianity in the coming years, mostly rural Chuhras, with the Christian Punjabi population increasing from 10,171 in 1890 to over 300,000 by 1921. Rather than the missionaries specifically targeting the lower castes, the lower castes sought out the missionaries and converted on their own volition in their aspirations for higher social mobility, with the churches being apprehensive about the growing ranks of native lower caste Christians and worrying that it may damage their reputation, preferring high caste converts. The increasing rate of conversion to Christianity would spark inter-religious rivalries between the main religions of Punjab, especially after a controversial article published in The Tribune on 19 October 1892 which suggested that Punjab would become a Christian region due to the conversion rate. This led to the organizations trying to win-over the untouchables allegiance to their particular religion. The Arya Samaj had become active in Punjab by the late 19th century and was against untouchability and Brahminical superiority, with them adopting the Shuddhi ceremony in-order to ritually purify lower castes so they could become ritually pure Hindus, equivalent to a dwija. The Shuddhi ceremony saw numeric success with many lower castes undergoing the ritual, however it did not ultimately affect the long-term socio-economic status of the lower castes. Instead, it consolidated the strength of the Punjabi Hindu elite by retaining the masses of lower castes under the Hindu identity, which improved their political power. The only difference was now the untouchables who underwent the Shuddhi could wear a sacred thread and recite from the Vedas. Jodhka attributes the failure of the Arya Samaj's Shuddhi campaign being due to it not completely rejecting the concept of Varna, instead it underhandedly affirmed it by still working off the notions of ritual purity in the attempt to ritually purify the untouchables in a ceremony, which still places ritual purity at an elevated position. The Arya Samaj campaigned against the Christians, Muslims, and Sikhs of Punjab, with the group also performing Shuddhi for Sikhs to "re-convert" them back to the Hindu identity. Sikh leadership was concerned about the demographic threat this posed and began to promote the idea that Sikhism is a distinct religion from Hinduism and that observation of caste amongst the Sikhs was due to the influence of Hinduism, which pushed the Sikh organizations to campaign against untouchability and other caste-related malpractices within their own ranks. The Singh Sabha and Akali movements in the early 20th century, particularly the 1920s, pushed for reforms, such as removing the mahant custodians from their positions of management over Sikh shrines on the premise that they had been discriminating against the entry of lower-castes to the sites. Another change made the role of the Brahmin priest redundant amongst the Sikhs for marital purposes with the introduction of the Anand Karaj ceremony, being replaced by a Sikh priest who could be a lower caste, with the position of priesthood amongst the Sikhs being achieved rather than ascribed, as in the case of the Brahmin priests. The Khalsa Diwan also enacted its own movements for the untouchable sections in-order to appeal to them.

There were various Dalit movements of colonial Punjab that pushed to secure their own rights, the most prominent among them were the Ad-Dharmis. The establishment of the Ad-Dharmi movement was facilitated by the increasing demand for leather by the British for footwear and other products, which improved the economic position of the Chamars, especially in the Doaba region, leading them to afford to become educated and travel abroad, were they were exposed to secular and leftist ideas. The early leaders of the Ad-Dharm movement were originally affiliated for the most part with Arya Samaj but became disillusioned with the organization. In June 1926, Ad-Dharm movement was launched by Babu Mangu Ram Mugowalia for the upliftment of the Dalits of Punjab. Ad-Dharam movement's aim was to create a separate religion and identity for the Dalits. The first meeting of the movement was held on 11–12 June 1926 in Hoshiarpur. The movement also created its political organization, called Ad-Dharam Mandal, to fulfill its political ideas. It contested the 1937 elections and won one seat. It was successful in spreading awareness and assertion among Dalits. They also contested 1945-46 elections in alliance with Unionist Party, in which Mangoo Ram got elected. To bring consciousness in the Dalit community, they also started newspapers like Adi Danka and Ujjala.

=== Post-independence ===
==== Punjab, Pakistan ====
In 1957, Pakistan officially recognized forty non-Muslim groups as being scheduled castes. However, in Pakistan the castes listed as scheduled castes are necessarily read as being Hindu-only, despite the existence of Dalit Muslims and Dalit Christians in Pakistan. This is due to the prevailing belief in Pakistan that there are no caste-hierarchies being observed amongst Muslims and that Dalits exist in India, not Pakistan. Meanwhile, many Dalits reject the Hindu label and prefer to classify themselves as being members of "indigenous cultures and traditions". The majority of Dalits in Pakistan are Christian. There is no reliable caste-census available for Pakistan. Despite the Dalits of Pakistan being allotted a six-percent reservation in government jobs in 1948, this was never put into action and the requirement was dropped in the 1990s.

==== Punjab, India ====
The government accords the Scheduled Castes certain benefits in-regards to jobs and education through reservations. The idea was that doing-so would form an elite-group amongst the Scheduled Castes, which could assist their community as a whole, rather than believing such reservations would completely eradicate their disadvantaged position in itself. An issue that was observed was that certain SC families would monopolize and benefit from the reservation benefits across multiple generations, with children of those who benefited from the reservations doing the same. In Jalandhar, the Chamar/Ad-Dharmis have become inflential in the local industries related to the production of surgical instruments, sporting goods, and leather. Despite small successes, the SCs of Punjab remain disadvantaged, thus the Punjab government accorded a section of them the status of "Depressed Schduled Castes" to assist them. This sub-category also includes the de-notified tribes, which suffer especially due to their lower population which decreases their political power, and their nomadic livelihood means they lack property. Furthermore, the de-notified tribes' low education levels disqualify them from many reserved jobs.

The Sikhs leaders pushed for reservation benefits of Scheduled Castes for low-caste Sikhs, as they worried if such benefits were only accorded to low-caste Hindus, many Sikhs would label themselves as Hindus in-order to obtain such benefits. Despite the lobbying made by Sikhs, only four Sikh untouchable sub-castes were designated as Scheduled Castes, despite all the Hindu untouchable castes being accorded the status. This provision was permitted on the promise that the Sikhs would make no further political demands. The separate Ad-Dharmi religious identity eroded as the Ad-Dharmis were re-classified as a Hindu scheduled caste, despite being recognized as a separate, religious community during the British period. Thus, Ad-Dharmis came to view themselves as a caste rather than a religious group.

A shift that began in the colonial-period which continues in post-independence Punjab is the move away by the Scheduled Castes from their traditional occupations to other work. Whilst in the colonial-period, this occupational shift was spurned on by social reform movements, after 1947 it was often due to technological advances that the shift hastened, such as the Green Revolution (multiple croppings and mechanization) and accompanied changes to rural social-life, which meant less traditional labour was needed for agriculture, yet providing newer types of agricultural work, and farmers preferred formal contracts with workers rather the traditional system of patrons and clients. To meet this demand, migrant workers from other states of India were recruited to work in agriculture in Punjab, with Scheduled Castes also engaging in agricultural work. Punjab comparatively has high salaries for agricultural work when compared to other areas of India. In Doaba, the Scheduled Castes have even moved away from agricultural work as well, with this shift away from agriculture being less notable in Malwa. Due to this occupational shift, 81% of Ad-Dharmis worked in fields other than leather-tanning and 96% of Mazhabis do not work in scavenging. Therefore, the jobs worked by the Scheduled Castes in Punjab have increasingly diversified and are characterized as being "caste-free" work.

Whilst modern Punjab does not list any groups under the Scheduled Tribe (ST) designation, during British-rule the Sansis, Bazigars, and Bouria were categorized as Scheduled Tribes in Punjab. After independence, the former three ST groups of Punjab were re-categorized as SCs.

In 2001, thirty-seven community-groups were designated as SCs in the Punjab, with two more, the Mahatam/Rai Sikhs and the Mochi, being added to the SC list prior to the 2011 census. There are currently thirty-nine groups listed as SCs and sixty-eight listed as OBCs in Punjab, India, with no groups being listed as STs.

On 21 September 2021, Charanjit Singh Channi became the first person from Dalit community to become the Chief Minister of Punjab. He was appointed as a chief minister by Congress Party after the resignation of Captain Amarinder Singh. He ruled for about 6 months before expiry of his term.

== List ==
=== India ===
According to a 2011 district census handbook, there were thirty-nine groups classified as Scheduled Castes (SCs) in the Punjab state of India: (Note: There are no Scheduled Tribes (STs) notified in the Punjab State of India.)

1. Ad Dharmi
2. Chuhra, Balmiki, Bhangi
3. Bangali
4. Barar, Burar, Berar
5. Batwal, Barwala
6. Bauria, Bawaria
7. Bazigar
8. Bhanjra
9. Chamar, Jatia Chamar, Rehgar, Raigar, Ramdasi, Ravidasi, Ramdasia, Ramdasia Sikh, Ravidasia, Ravidasia Sikh
10. Chanal
11. Dagi
12. Darain
13. Deha, Dhaya, Dhea
14. Dhanak
15. Dhogri, Dhangri, Siggi
16. Dumna, Mahasha, Doom
17. Gagra
18. Gandhila, Gandil Gondola
19. Kabirpanthi, Julaha
20. Khatik
21. Kori, Koli
22. Marija, Marecha
23. Mazhabi, Mazhabi Sikh
24. Megh
25. Nat
26. Od
27. Pasi
28. Perna
29. Pherera
30. Sanhai
31. Sanhal
32. Sansi, Bhedkut, Manesh
33. Sansoi
34. Sapela
35. Sarera
36. Sikligar
37. Sirkiband
38. Mochi
39. Mahatam, Rai Sikh

=== Pakistan ===
Forty non-Muslim groups are classified as Scheduled Castes in Pakistan through Ordinance 1957 ordinance No. XVI of 1957, namely the following: (Note: Ordinance 1957 ordinance No. XVI of 1957 of Pakistan applies to all the territory of West Pakistan and the Federal Capital, which would include the province of Punjab, Pakistan.)

1. Ad Dharmi
2. Bangali
3. Barar
4. Bawaria
5. Bazigar
6. Bhangi
7. Bhanjra
8. Bhil
9. Chamar
10. Chanal
11. Charan
12. Chuhra, or Balmiki
13. Dagi and Koli
14. Dhanak
15. Dhed
16. Dumna
17. Gagra
18. Gandhila
19. Halal-Khor
20. Jatia
21. Kalal
22. Khatik
23. Kolhi
24. Kori
25. Kuchria
26. Marija, or Marecha
27. Megh
28. Menghwar
29. Nat
30. Od
31. Pasi
32. Perna
33. Ramdasi
34. Sansi
35. Sapela
36. Sarera
37. Shikari
38. Sirkiband
39. Sochi
40. Wagri

== Demographics ==
=== Population ===
In 1991, the Scheduled caste population of Punjab was 28.3% of the total population, with some districts having their percentage as high as 38% of the population. The total population of Punjab was projected to be 30% in the future, as the scheduled caste population has a higher fertility-rate due to lower socio-economic parameters. The majority of the poor population in the 1981 and 1991 censuses in Punjab were members of the Scheduled Castes, with their urbanization and literacy rates also lagging behind that of the rest of the population. The Punjabi scheduled caste population is also more rural proportionately than the rest of the population, with them comprising the majority of the population in some villages. As of September 2020, the caste population data foreach Forward caste citizen in Punjab collected in Socio Economic and Caste Census 2011 has not been released to public by Government of India. Scheduled Castes and Other Backward Classes form 63.2% of the total population of Punjab, India.

Castes of Punjab (2011)
1. Scheduled Castes (Dalits) (31.9%)
2. Upper castes (UC) (33.0%)
3. Other Backward Classes (OBC or BC) (31.3%)
4. religious minorities (3.80%)

Caste Population data of Punjab, India
Constitutional categories	Population (%)	Castes
Other Backward Classes (OBC)	31.3%	includes Sainis,Kamboj, Labana, Tarkhan/Ramgarhia, Kumhar/Prajapati, Arain, Gujjar, Teli, Banjara, Lohar, Bhat, Others
Scheduled Castes (Dalits not including Rai Sikh statistics)	31.9%	includes Mazhabi Sikh – 10%, Ramdasia Sikh/Ravidassia (Chamar)/Ad-Dharmi – 13.1%, Balmiki/Bhanghi – 3.5%, Bazigar – 1.05%, Others - 4%
General castes/Forward castes	33%	includes Jat Sikh and Hindu Jat – 21%, Bishnoi, Rajput (includes Sikh Rajputs),Brahmin, Khatri, Sood, Arora, Bania(Agarwal), Bhatia (remaining 12%)
religious minorities	3.8%	includes Muslims, Christians, Buddhists, Jains

According to the 2011 census, 73.3% SC population predominantly lives in rural areas and 26.6% in urban areas of Punjab. In the state, 60.8% SCs follow Sikhism, 38.8% Hinduism and 0.3% Buddhism.

Below is the list of districts according to the percentage of their SC population, according to 2011 census.

Scheduled Caste population by district (2011)
Sr. No.	District	Percentage
1	Shahid Bhagat Singh Nagar	42.51%
2	Muktsar	42.31%
3	Fazilka	42.27%
4	Firozpur	42.07%
5	Jalandhar	38.95%
6	Faridkot	38.92%
7	Moga	36.50%
8	Hoshiarpur	35.14%
9	Kapurthala	33.94%
10	Tarn Taran	33.71%
11	Mansa	33.63%
12	Bathinda	32.44%
13	Barnala	32.24%
14	Fatehgarh Sahib	32.07%
15	Amritsar	30.95%
16	Pathankot	30.60%
17	Sangrur	27.89%
18	Ludhiana	26.39%
19	Rupnagar	25.42%
20	Patiala	24.55%
21	Gurdaspur	23.03%
22	SAS Nagar	21.74%

=== Religion ===
Scheduled caste (SC) population among different religions in Punjab - Census 2011

Religion	Total Population	Scheduled Caste Population	Scheduled Caste Population %
Sikh	16,004,754	5,390,484	33.68%
Hindu	10,678,138	3,442,305	32.23%
Buddhist	33,237	27,390	82.40%

Scheduled Caste by religious community

Scheduled Caste		Population	Religion		
Code	Caste	Population	Sikhism	Hinduism	Buddhism
001	Ad-Dharmi	10,17,192	86,067	9,12,347	18,778
002	Balmiki, Bhangi, Chuhra	8,66,953	2,07,650	6,57,715	1,588
003	Bangali	4,690	30	4,657	3
004	Barar, Burar, Berar	8,451	500	7,951	0
005	Batwal, Barwala	19,979	225	19,753	1
006	Bauria, Bawaria	1,25,259	99,599	25,650	10
007	Bazigar	2,41,125	81,857	1,59,230	39
008	Bhanjara	3,659	559	3,103	0
009	Chamar, Jatia Chamar, Rehgar, Raigar, Ramdasi, Ravidasi, Ramdasia, Ramdasia Sikh, Ravidasia, Ravidasia Sikh	20,78,132	14,43,079	6,29,157	5,896
010	Chanal	97	17	80	0
011	Dagi	321	20	300	1
012	Darian	865	277	588	0
013	Deha, Dhaya, Dhea	10,560	143	10,410	7
014	Dhanuk	89,406	5,697	83,671	38
015	Dhogri, Dhangri, Siggi	391	41	350	0
016	Dumna, Mahasha, Doom	2,02,710	7,732	1,94,951	27
017	Gagra	799	62	737	0
018	Gandhila, Gandil Gondola	3,513	94	3,418	1
019	Kabirpanthi, Julaha	84,711	23,696	60,976	69
020	Khatik	14,482	676	13,796	10
021	Kori, Koli	24,921	4,359	20,540	22
022	Marecha, Marija	260	45	215	0
023	Mazhabi, Mazhabi Sikh	26,33,921	25,62,761	71,000	160
024	Megh	1,41,023	3,456	1,37,559	8
025	Nat	3,902	139	3,763	0
026	Orh	32,061	513	31,544	4
027	Pasi	39,111	342	38,751	18
028	Perna	68	10	58	0
029	Pherera	80	2	78	0
030	Sanhai	359	1	357	1
031	Sanhal	1,538	7	1,531	0
032	Sansi, Bherkut, Manesh	1,22,201	65,630	56,553	18
033	Sansoi	456	41	415	0
034	Sapela	5,872	224	5,648	0
035	Sarera	14,419	7,267	7,151	1
036	Sikligar	11,806	9,268	2,538	1
037	Sirkiband	57,555	46,091	11,462	2
038	Mochi	4,763	153	4,610	0
039	Mahtam, Rai Sikh	5,16,695	4,65,764	50,901	30
GENERIC CASTES (members who identified as "Dalit", "Harijan", or "Anusuchit Jati")		4,71,871	2,66,393	2,04,791	687
		88,60,179	53,90,484	34,42,305	27,390

=== Divisions ===
The SC population is not uniform; there are diverse groups of varying population sizes, although all historically faced societal oppression and untouchability based on their caste. Around 75% of the Punjabi SC population belong to two main groups: The Chamar (including Ravidassias/Ramdasias and Ad-Dharmis) or Chuhra (including Balmikis and Mazhabis) communities. Some segments of the SC population are more socially and economically disadvantaged than others. The Chamars/Ad-Dharmis were the most successful in achieving upward social and economic mobility, with most reservations being given to them, so the government has accorded more reservations (more than half) to the Chuhras/Mazhabis so they can improve their standing. Thirteen of the SC groups (especially the smaller and less mobile ones) have been termed "Depressed Schduled Castes", including the seven caste groupings (de-notified tribes, vimukat jatis) that had been considered criminal tribes during the colonial period. The poverty rate of the de-notified tribes of Punjab may be as high as 96% and their literacy rates may be in the 10-12% range, such as amongst the Bangali, Bauzigars, and Bauria.

There are more than 35 designated scheduled castes in Punjab. Of these, the five largest account for 87% of the SC population. Mazhabis constitute 31.5%, Ravidasias/Ramdasias 26.2%, Ad-Dharmis 15% and Valmikis 11%.

== Health ==
As per National Family Health Survey (NFHS-4, 2015–16), the infant mortality rate was 40 per 1000 live births before the age of one year for scheduled castes, compared to 29 per 1000 births for the state as a whole. The infant mortality rate for other backward castes (OBC) was 21 per 1000 live births and 22 per 1000 for those who are not from SC and OBC classes.

Although the prevalence of anaemia (low levels of haemoglobin in the blood) has been found quite high among all population groups in Punjab, it was still higher among the SC population than other groups. For the women between the ages of 15 and 49 years, the prevalence of anaemia among SC women was 56.9%, compared to 53.5% for the state as a whole. Among the children between the ages of 6 and 59 months, the rate of anaemia for SC children was 60%, compared to 56.9% for the state as a whole.

The table below compares the health status of Scheduled Caste population of Punjab, according to NFHS-3.

Health status of Scheduled Caste (SC) population of Punjab (NFHS-3)
Indicators	SC	Total
Infant Mortality Rate	46	44
Child Mortality Rate	16	7
Anaemic (child)	73.80%	66.40%
Anaemic (women)	42.60%	38.00%

The table below shows the early childhood mortality rates in Punjab by caste, according to NFHS-4 (2015–16).

Early childhood mortality rate in Punjab by caste, according to NFHS-4 (2015–16)
Background Characteristics	SC	OBC	Others	Total
Neonatal Mortality	27.0	16.9	17.1	21.2
Post-neonatal Mortality	12.7	3.6	5.2	8.0
Infant Mortality	39.6	20.5	22.4	29.2
Child Mortality	6.5	3.3	1.9	4.1
Under five Mortality	45.9	23.7	24.2	33.2

== Education ==
According to the 2011 census, the literacy rate among Scheduled Castes in Punjab was 64.81%, compared to 75.84% for the whole state. The SC literacy rate of females was 58.39% and 70.66% for male SCs.

The table below shows the Scheduled castes literacy rate in Punjab through the years.

Scheduled castes literacy rate in Punjab through the years
Year	Percent
2011	64.81%
1991	41.10%
1981	23.86%
1971	16.12%
1961	9.64%

The table below gives the literacy rate of Scheduled castes by district, according to the 2011 census.

Scheduled caste (SC) literacy rate by districts - Census 2011
Sr. No.	District	SC Percentage	District total	Gap
1	Hoshiarpur	82.49%	84.59%	2.10%
2	Rupnagar	78.4%	82.19%	3.79%
3	Shahid Bhagat Singh Nagar	77.72 %	79.78%	2.06%
4	SAS Nagar	76.1%	83.80%	7.70%
5	Jalandhar	76.68%	82.48%	5.80%
6	Gurdaspur	72.89%	79.95%	7.06%
7	Ludhiana	72.65%	82.20%	9.55%
8	Fatehgarh Sahib	72.19%	79.35%	7.16%
9	Kapurthala	71.29%	79.07%	7.78%
10	Patiala	62.28%	75.28%	13%
11	Amritsar	59.16%	76.27%	17.11%
12	Sangrur	57.60%	67.99%	10.39%
13	Moga	55.23%	70.68%	15.45%
14	Firozpur	55.38%	68.92%	13.54%
15	Faridkot	54.91%	69.55%	14.64%
16	Barnala	54.91%	67.82%	12.91%
17	Bathinda	53.09%	68.28%	15.19%
18	Tarn Taran	51.37%	67.81%	16.14%
19	Muktsar	50.46%	65.81%	15.35%
20	Mansa	48.72%	61.83%	13.11%
	Punjab	64.81%	75.84%	11.03%

The table below shows the Scheduled Castes literacy rate of districts of Punjab by gender, as of 2011 census.

Scheduled castes literacy rate in districts of Punjab by gender, as of 2011 census
District	Female	Male	Gap
Hoshiarpur	76.84%	87.96%	11.12%
Rupnagar	71.37%	84.86%	13.49%
Jalandhar	70.97%	82.03%	11.06%
SBS Nagar	70.96%	84.25%	13.29%
SAS Nagar	69.52%	81.96%	12.44%
Gurdaspur (including Pathankot)	66.34%	78.86%	12.52%
Ludhiana	65.99%	78.61%	12.62%
Fatehgarh Sahib	65.66%	71.99%	6.33%
Kapurthala	65.3%	76.84%	11.54%
Patiala	54.8%	68.99%	14.19%
Amritsar	52.83%	64.88%	12.05%
Sangrur	50.81%	63.65%	12.84%
Moga	50.14%	59.75%	9.01%
Barnala	50.14%	59.17%	9.03%
Faridkot	48.54%	60.62%	12.08%
Firozpur (including Fazilka)	47.05%	63.1%	16.05%
Bathinda	47.01%	58.57%	11.56%
Tarn Taran	44.57%	57.51%	12.94%
Sri Muktsar Sahib	43.58%	56.69%	13.11%
Mansa	43.42%	53.49%	10.97%
Punjab (whole)	58.39%	70.66%	12.27%

== Politics ==
As of 2023, out of the 117 legislative assembly constituencies in Punjab, 34 are reserved for Scheduled Castes.

== Economy ==
The poverty rate of SCs in Punjab was 15.6% in 2011–12, compared to the 8.2% for the whole state. The SC rate of 2011-12 declined from 38.2% in 1993–94, at the rate of 3.1%. Dalits comprise 62.3% of the total number of people living Below Poverty Line (BPL) in Punjab, India.

Despite comprising 31.94% of the Punjab's population, Dalits own only 3.5% of its total land. About 73.33% of the Dalit population lives in villages and is largely landless and faces housing shortages. According to the Punjab Village Common Lands (Regulation) Act, 1964, 33% of the village commons land (shamlaat) is reserved for the Dalits. But in many cases, they have been denied these rights by big landlords with fraudulent means.

== Atrocities and discrimination ==
In 2019, 166 crimes against Dalits were reported in Punjab, India. This amounted to the rate of 1.9 crimes per 1 Lakh of the Dalit population in the state. This rate was lower than the 22.8 per 1 Lakh Dalit population for the country as a whole.

In March 2023, a 26 year old Dalit female doctor doing her internship at an SGPC-run Medical college in Amritsar died by suicide after allegedly being subjected to caste discrimination and abuse. About 10 people, including 2 and 4 students of Sri Guru Ram Dass Institute of Medical Science and Research at Vallah, were later booked by police under charges of abetment to suicide and under provisions of SC/ST Prevention of Atrocities Act. According to the victim's mother, the accused allegedly used to make casteist slurs on her and would also used to threaten her that they will not let her complete her MBBS degree. The mother also alleged that they had complained about it to the principal but nothing was done.

The table below shows the number of recorded crimes against scheduled caste and scheduled tribe people from 2010 to 2018.

Crimes against scheduled caste and scheduled tribe people in Punjab
Year	Murder	Rape	POA Act	Hurt	Kidnapping	Miscellaneous
2018	13	30	32	6	4	82
2017	7	17	31	3	2	58
2016	7	16	41	1	3	64
2015	8	14	23	5	3	94
2014	4	19	16	2	3	79
2013	7	22	13	37	8	39
2012	4	12	8	21	2	24
2011	5	9	24	27	2	22
2010	4	18	50	13	0	30

== See also ==
- Scheduled Castes and Scheduled Tribes
- Dalit
- Ravidassia
- Ramdasia
- Sikh Light Infantry
- Mazhabi Sikh
- Caste system in India
- Demographics of Punjab, India
- Sikhism and caste
