= List of Scheduled Castes in Himachal Pradesh =

List of Dalits in Himachal

This article contains list of Scheduled Castes in Himachal Pradesh. The population of Scheduled castes is 17,29,252 out of 68,64,602 of the state population as of 2011 census. They comprise of 25.19% of the population, which is the second highest after Punjab in the country.

They are 59 communities that are recognized as Scheduled Castes in the state.

== List ==
1. Ad Dharmi
2. Badhi, Nagalu
3. Balmiki, Bhangi, Chuhra, Chura, Chuhre
4. Bandhela
5. Bangali
6. Bansi
7. Barad
8. Barar, Burar, Berar
9. Barwala
10. Batwal
11. Bauria, Bawaria
12. Bazigar
13. Bhanjra, Bhanjre
14. Chamar, Jatia Chamar, Rehgar, Raigar, Ramdasi, Ravidasi, Ramdasia, Mochi
15. Chanal
16. Chhimbe, Dhobi
17. Dagi
18. Darai, Daryai
19. Darain
20. Daule, Daole
21. Dhaki, Toori
22. Dhanuk
23. Dhaogri, Dhuai
24. Dhogri, Dhangri, Siggi
25. Doomna, Dumna, Dumne,
26. Gagra
27. Gandhila, Gandil Gondola
28. Hali
29. Hesi
30. Jogi
31. Julaha, Julahe, Kabirpanthi, Keer
32. Kamoh, Dagoli
33. Karoack
34. Khatik
35. Kori, Koli
36. Lohar
37. Marija, Marecha
38. Mazhabi
39. Megh
40. Nat
41. Od
42. Pasi
43. Perna
44. Phrera, Pherera
45. Rehar, Rehara
46. Sanhai
47. Sanhal
48. Sansi, Bhedkut, Manesh
49. Sansoi
50. Sapela
51. Sarde, Sarera, Sarare, Siryare, Sarehde
52. Sikligar
53. Sipi
54. Sirkiband
55. Teli
56. Thathiar, Thathera

== Demographics ==
=== Community wise ===
Community	Total Population	
Community	Population (2011)	Percentage
Ad Dharmi	6,217	0.359
Badhi, Nagalu	22,352	1.287
Balmiki, Bhangi, Chuhra	34,690	2.006
Bandhela	58	0.003
Bangali	4,294	0.248
Banjara	3,285	0.189
Bansi	1,419	0.082
Barad	5,890	0.341
Barar, Burar, Berar	116	0.007
Batwal	16,690	0.965
Bauria, Bawaria	497	0.029
Bazigar	2,365	0.137
Bhanjra, Bhanjre	4,917	0.284
Chamar, Rehgar, Ramdasia, Mochi, etc.	4,58,838	26.534
Chanal	24,340	1.407
Chhimbe, Dhobi	18,076	1.045
Dagi	4,683	0.271
Darain	554	0.032
Darya, Daryai	10,982	0.635
Daule, Dhole	4,134	0.239
Dhaki, Toore	9,657	0.558
Dhanuk	172	0.012
Doom, Dumna, Mahasha, etc.	83,757	4.843
Gagra	33	0.002
Gandhila, etc.	92	0.006
Hali	43,218	2.499
Hessi	3,209	0.185
Jogi	21,096	1.219
Julaha, Kabirpanthi, Keer	1,55,956	9.019
Kamoh, Dagoli	316	0.018
Karaock	38	0.002
Khatik	587	0.034
Koli, Kori	4,99,473	28.883
Lohar	1,70,046	9.833
Marija, Marecha	26	0.001
Mazhabi	460	0.026
Megh	1,779	0.103
Nat	311	0.018
Od	1,135	0.065
Pasi	1,496	0.086
Perna	15	0.001
Pherera, Phrera	1,744	0.101
Rehar, Rehara	3,018	0.174
Sanhai	2,528	0.146
Sanhal	220	0.013
Sansi, Bhedkut, Manesh	2,276	0.132
Sansoi	1,389	0.080
Sapela	62	0.003
Siryara, Sarde, etc.	15,943	0.091
Sikligar	1,476	0.085
Sippi	26,907	1.729
Sirkiband	63	0.003
Teli	9,425	0.545
Thathera, Thathiar	662	0.038
Barwala	285	0.016
GENERIC CASTES, etc.	45,985	2.659
	1,729,252	100%

=== District wise ===
District		Scheduled Castes		Largest community (Top 3)
District	Population (2011)	Population	Percent	Largest community (Top 3)
Bilaspur	381,956	98,989	25.92	Chamar (50,930); Julaha (22,894); Lohar (9,787)
Chamba	519,080	111,690	21.52	Hali (41,056); Sippi (19,141); Chamar (11,646)
Hamirpur	454,768	109,256	24.02	Chamar (52,111); Julaha (24,193); Lohar (11,073)
Kangra	1,510,075	319,385	21.15	Chamar (108,559); Julaha (38,446); Lohar (28,372)
Kinnaur	84,121	14,750	17.53	Koli (8,605); Lohar (1,713); Julaha (1,365)
Kullu	437,903	122,659	28.01	Koli (83,532); Lohar (19,324); Chamar (6,490)
Lahaul and Spiti	31,564	2,235	7.08	Chanal (1,132); Lohar (605); Koli (130)
Mandi	999,777	293,739	29.38	Koli (98,718); Chamar (69,703); Lohar (55,954)
Shimla	814,010	215,777	26.51	Koli (149,329); Chamar (11,635); Balmiki (10,020)
Sirmaur	529,855	160,745	30.34	Koli (94,924); Chamar (20,568); Doom (12,498)
Solan	580,320	164,536	28.35	Chamar (59,149); Koli (41,679); Julaha (21,177)
Una	521,173	115,491	22.16	Chamar (67,703); Julaha (16,168); Lohar (11,563)
	6,864,602	1,729,252	25.19	
