= List of Scheduled Castes in Jammu and Kashmir =

Below a list of Scheduled Caste communities and their population according to the 2001 and 2011 Census of India in the state of Jammu and Kashmir.

== Demographics ==
=== Community wise ===
Scheduled Caste		Population	
Code	Communities	2001	2011
001	Barwala	24,683	33,225
002	Basith	18,866	24,407
003	Batwal	42,731	43,945
004	Chamar or Ramdasia, Chamar-Rohidas, Chamar-Ravidas	1,87,277	2,12,032
005	Balmiki, Chuhra, Mehtar	9,000	6,918
006	Dhyar	7,566	8,343
007	Doom or Mahasha, Dumna	1,59,908	1,93,803
008	Gardi	3,268	4,596
009	Jolaha	467	306
010	Megh or Kabirpanthi	3,00,980	3,05,794
011	Rattal	1,913	2,784
012	Saryara	13,327	15,825
013	Watal	169	146
Generic castes, etc.		1,59,908	75,957
	Total Population	770,155	924,991

=== District wise ===
District		Scheduled Castes		
Name	Population (2011)	Total	Percent	Top 3 castes (by pop)
Kupwara	870,354	1,048	0.12	Chamar (679); Megh (35); Balmiki (19)
Budgam	753,745	368	0.05	Chamar (194); Megh (21); Balmiki (7)
Leh	133,487	488	0.36	Chamar (235); Mahasha (112); Balmiki (41)
Kargil	140,802	18	0.01	Batwal (4); Dhyar (4); Mahasha (3)
Poonch	476,820	556	0.12	Chamar (211); Balmiki (80); Mahasha (37)
Rajouri	619,266	48,157	7.78	Basith (22,759); Chamar (17,566); Megh (1,153)
Kathua	615,711	1,41,224	22.94	Mahasha (62,723); Chamar (42,066); Megh (26,647)
Baramula	1,008,039	1,476	0.15	Chamar (799); Megh (38); Balmiki (24)
Bandipore	392,232	392	0.09	Chamar (101); Balmiki (70); Saryara (6)
Srinagar	1,236,829	1,068	0.09	Chamar (287); Balmiki (54); Megh (29)
Ganderbal	297,446	117	0.04	Chamar (59); Balmiki (24)
Pulwama	560,440	402	0.07	Chamar (91); Megh (29); Balmiki (17)
Shopian	266,215	43	0.02	Chamar (30); Balmiki (7); Mahasha (1)
Anantnag	1,078,692	1,826	0.17	Chamar (563); Balmiki (36); Mahasha (34)
Kulgam	424,483	21	NA	
Doda	409,576	53,408	13.04	Megh (40,722); Mahasha (6,888); Chamar (2,805)
Ramban	283,313	13,920	4.91	Megh (7,540); Mahasha (2,539); Chamar (1,813)
Kishtwar	231,037	14,307	6.19	Megh (12,926); Barwala (496); Batwal (493)
Udhampur	555,357	1,38,569	24.95	Megh (52,961); Mahasha (45,732); Chamar (33,321)
Reasi	314,714	37,757	11.99	Megh (11,425); Chamar (8,544); Dhyar (6,915)
Jammu	1,526,406	3,77,991	24.76	Megh (173,823); Chamar (71,795); Mahasha (43,065)
Samba	318,611	91,835	28.82	Megh (31,611); Chamar (30,827); Mahasha (25,459)

== See also ==
- Scheduled Castes
