= Hardu-Aboora =

Hardu-Aboora Hardu-Aboor
- Village
- Location in Jammu and Kashmir, India Hardu-Aboora (India)
- Coordinates: 34.06°N 74.39°E
- Country: India
- Union territory: Jammu and Kashmir
- District: Baramulla

Languages
  - Official: Kashmiri, Urdu, Hindi, Dogri, English
- Time zone: UTC+5:30 (IST)
- PIN: 193401

Hardu-Aboora or Hardu-Aboor is a locality in Karhama tehsil in Baramulla district in the Indian union territory of Jammu and Kashmir. It is situated on the banks of Ferozpora Nallah, at the foothills of the mountain range that runs parallel to the Srinagar-Gulmarg highway on its left side, some 15 km (9.3 mi) from Tangmarg town, Baramulla and 29 km (18 mi) from the state capital, Srinagar, and 10 km (6.2 mi) from railway station Mazhama. Under new Administrative units, Hardu Aboora was granted CD Block status, under the jurisdiction of newly carved tehsil, Karhama.

== Features ==
Shrines of Sufi saints Syed Ahmad Rumi, Shah Fatahullah Qadiri, Saboor Khan and Rahim are located in the area. A branch of J&K Bank, BDO Office, a government high school and a private middle school namely SARoomi' besides a branch Post Office. Hardu-Aboora is the center for many villages such as Kharpora and Tarahama. Hardu-Aboora has a Primary Health Center either.

== Demographics ==
The literacy rate has increased over time; it was 50% in 2008 and later rose 73%. Most people in the village depend on the business for livelihood. Hardu Aboora is famous for its handicrafts and kulchas (salty biscuit).

== Transportation ==
Hardu-Aboora is well connected to the rest of valley. Bus services operate from several well-known places such as summer capital Srinagar, Baramulla, and Tangmarg. Under the National Rural Employment Guarantee Act, 2005, the village has undergone some development, although a few bridges are still under construction. Once completed, these will significantly enhance the village's infrastructure. Nearby places include Dhobiwan, Kunzer, and Magam.
