= Manglora =

Manglora Monglor, Monglar, Monglora, Monglara
- Village
- Location within Jammu and Kashmir Location within India
- Country: India
- Union territory: Jammu and Kashmir
- District: Baramulla
- Tehsil: Kunzer

Government
  - Type: Panchayati raj
  - Body: Gram panchayat

Languages
  - Official: Kashmiri, Urdu, Hindi, Dogri, English
- Time zone: UTC+5:30 (IST)
- PIN: 193121

Manglora, also spelled Monglora or Monglara, is a village on the Narbal-Tangmarg road in the Baramulla district of the union territory of Jammu and Kashmir. It comes under tehsil Kunzer.

== Economy ==
People are mostly engaged in agriculture, with some employed in the public sector. Orchards are also owned by many families. A farm science centre (Krishi Vigyan Kendra) lies nearby. A power distribution station is also located in the village. Accommodation facilities are available for tourists in hotel Apple Tree Resorts and there are other wayside facilities also for tourists. Other accommodation facilities have come up for tourists like Pandith Arts Emporium, Amberwood Inn, and also Dhabas and dry fruit shops like Payam Fastfood, Raja Dhaba.( vegetarian ), Al Habib Dry Fruits and Dhaba etc. Arts emporia have also come up like Hamadan a Caravan. A fuel station lies nearby towards Batpora.

== Religion ==
All people follow Islam. A Sufi shrine is located to east of the village.

== Geography ==
Batpora and Kunzer lie 2 km (1.2 mi) to its west. On the East, lie Dhobiwan and Lalpora. Wussan and Sahipora lie towards the South and Hardbani is located towards the North.

== Languages ==
Kashmiri is the main language spoken.
