= Bhiku Ramji Idate =

Indian social worker

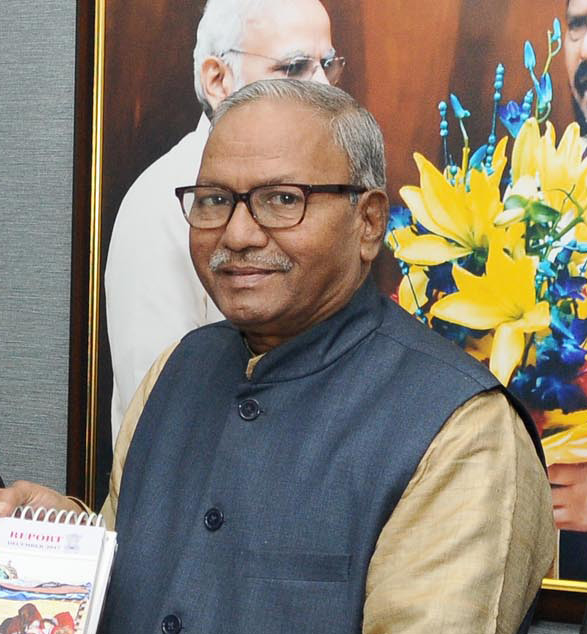
- Born: June 2, 1949 (age 75); Ratnagiri district, Maharashtra
- Occupation: Social worker
- Known for: Work for Denotified, Nomadic, and Semi-Nomadic Tribes
- Awards: Padma Shri (2023)

Bhiku Ramji Idate (born 2 June 1949), also known as Dada Idate, is an Indian social worker who was awarded the Padma Shri, India's fourth-highest civilian award, in 2023 for his contributions in the field of social work. He is recognized for his extensive work towards the welfare and upliftment of denotified and nomadic tribes in India.

== Early life and career ==
Born in a village in Ratnagiri District of Maharashtra, Idate began his career as a teacher. However, motivated by the condition of poor nomadic tribes, he left teaching to dedicate himself to social work. He has since worked for over five decades for the socio-economically oppressed communities.

Idate has played a significant role in advocating for the rights and development of denotified and nomadic tribes. He founded the Bhatke Vimukta Vikas Parishad and other organizations focused on these communities. He also established the Savitribai Phule Shikshan Prasarak (SPSP) Mandal in 1992, which has been instrumental in providing educational opportunities through colleges, schools, and hostels in backward areas of Maharashtra.

He chaired the Idate Committee constituted by the Government of Maharashtra in 1999. Later, as the Chairperson of the National Commission for Denotified Nomadic and Semi-Nomadic Tribes (NCDNT) in 2015, he made several important recommendations for the upliftment of these communities. He also served as the former chairperson of the Union Development and Welfare Board for Denotified Nomadic and Semi-Nomadic Communities.

Idate has written over seven books and is a follower of Rashtriya Swayamsevak Sangh ideology.

== Awards and recognition ==
Bhiku Ramji Idate has received numerous awards from various institutions and organizations for his social work, including:

- Madhukarrao Deval Samajik Award (1991)
- Swami Vivekanand Seva Sanman Samajik Award (2005)
- KARMAVEER (2006)
- Dr. Babasaheb Ambedkar Prabodhan Award (2010)
- Rashtriya Gaurav Award
- Gunvant Nagarik Award
- Bharat Ratna Dr. A.P.J. Abdul Kalam Excellence Award
- Dr. Babasaheb Ambedkar Ratna Award
- Best Citizen of India
- Glory of India Award
- Baba Amte Prerana Award
- Samajik Award
- Atal Samaj Bhushan Award
- Jivan Gaurav Award
- Mahatma Phule Award
- Seva Ratna Rashtra Gaurav Award
- Padma Shri (2023)
