= Budhan Theatre =

Indian theatre group composed of members of the Chhara tribe

Founded in 1998, Budhan Theatre is an Indian theatre group composed of members of the Chhara tribe, one of India's groups of denotified or "criminal" tribal people in Ahmedabad, Gujarat. The Budhan Theatre was founded by Prof. Ganesh Devy G. N. Devy, a renowned linguist and professor of English Literature and Smt. Mahasweta Devi Mahasweta Devi a noted Bangla writer and Magsaysay awardee.

The style of theatre practiced by the theatre troupe is theatre for community development and theatre for social change. They perform street play, Intimate theatre and other experimental theatres to raise awareness about discrimination and violence faced by Chharas and other denotified tribal people in India. Their influences include the Indian People's Theatre Association, Bertoldt Brecht, and the Indian aesthetic of Rasa.

One of the iconic plays performed by Budhan Theatre is called Budhan. During the play, actors reenact the death of Budhan Sabar and demand justice for his murder.

== Diplomas ==
The group had also conducted a one-year diploma course in journalism; a diploma in theatre arts, journalism, and media studies; and a certificate course in dramatics.

The group is led by the youths of Chharanagar. Some of the key people include - Dakxin Bajarange, Kalpana Gagdekar, Roxy Gagdekar, Atish Indrekar, Ruchika Kodekar, Alok Gagdekar. Many youths from the Chhara community - which was once stigmatized as the criminal tribe by the British - are living a successful life by joining Budhan Theatre. Few examples include Alok Gagdekar (the National School of Drama Graduate- 2006), Vivek Ghamande (2007- NSD), Kalpana Gagdekar, Dakxin Bajrange and few more.

== Featured ==
The Budhan Theatre has been featured in Shashwati Talukdar and P. Kerim Friedman's documentary film Please Don't Beat Me, Sir. The film follows a group of young actors and their families, telling their stories against the backdrop of the history of India's denotified or "criminal" tribes.

== Etymology ==
Budhan Theatre takes its name from Budhan Sabar, a tribal man who was labeled a criminal, targeted, and murdered by the police in West Bengal.
