= National Commission =

National Commission may refer to:

- National Commission for Denotified, Nomadic and Semi-Nomadic Tribes
- National Commission for the Development of Indigenous Peoples
- National Commission on the Disappearance of Persons
- National Commission on Libraries and Information Science
- National Commission on Marihuana and Drug Abuse
- National Commission for Minorities
- National Commission on Population
- National Commission for the Protection of Human Subjects of Biomedical and Behavioral Research
- National Commission on Resources for Youth
- National Commission on the BP Deepwater Horizon Oil Spill and Offshore Drilling
- National Commission on Terrorist Attacks
- National Commission for Women
