= Tribal casteism =

Social marginalisation within tribes of South Asia

Tribal casteism encompasses South Asian practices of social marginalisation within tribes. These practices are often overlooked by scholars and the media because of a colonial legacy that employed orientalist empiricism to construct tribes as egalitarian and structurally opposite to Hindu caste society. Indian sociologists and historians often appeal to a "tribe-to-caste continuum" that has elements of contested social evolution and miss the fluid and changing nature of tribal social organization, both internally and with regard to state recognition for affirmative action quotas—Scheduled Castes and Scheduled Tribes.

== Overview ==
Scholars have not determined the scope of tribal casteism; there are no systematic surveys of the over 700 tribes and 2,000 tribal petitioning communities in India—a population of more than 100 million. There are specific ethnographers who either focus on tribal casteism or reference it in their work. In Himachal Pradesh, the activist-lawyer Lal Chand Dhissa detailed caste discriminations within tribes in his book The Injustices of the Constitution. He argues for central recognition of tribal casteism and the protection of "Scheduled Tribe Dalits" (Scheduled Tribes and Dalits are recognized as mutually exclusive by the Constitution of India).

Ethnographic analyses of the Gaddi tribe in Himachal Pradesh has focused on tribal casteism in the domains of ritual exclusion, Christian conversion, regional differences, and caste hiding through the Arya Samaj leading to state misrecognition and the denial of constitutionally mandated quotas. Tribal casteism is particularly harmful because it involves double marginalisation. Tribal people are often imagined as relatively primitive in the Indian collective consciousness of castes; and within these marginalised groups, there are indigenous practices of exclusion that are themselves casteist. Among them, there was internal statisfraction of lower caste community primarily Sippi and Hali for menial profession such as weaving and tanning.

== See also ==
- Tribal multiculturalism
