= Watal =

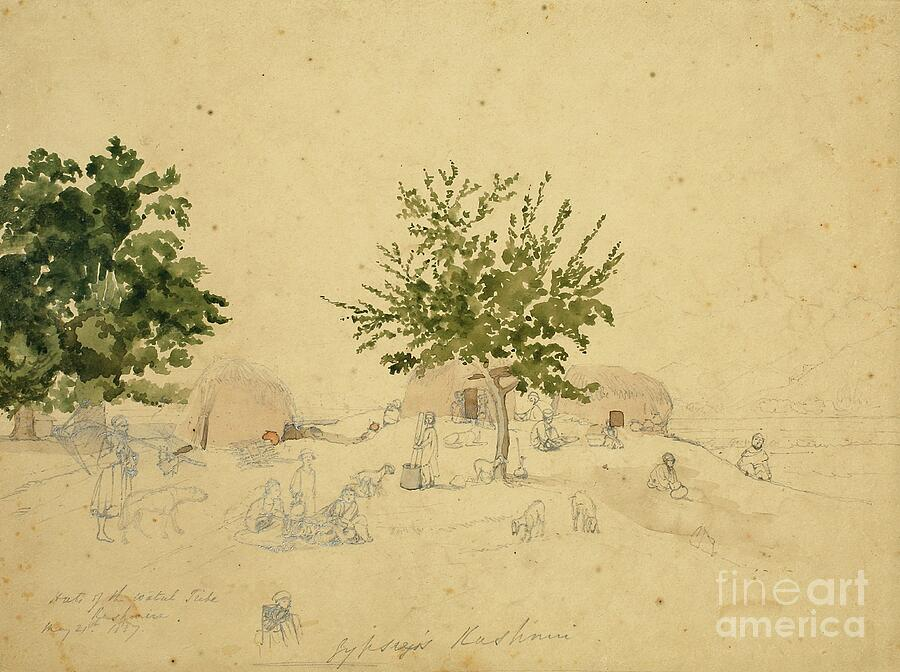
Painting of huts of the Watal tribe of Kashmir, during Sikh rule, by Godfrey Thomas Vigne, 1836

The Watal are a community and caste of Kashmiri Muslims indigenous to the Kashmir Valley of Jammu and Kashmir, India. The term 'Watal' also means cobbler in the Kashmiri language. The community is known by many names such as Batal, Battal, and Batul. They natively speak an unclassified Indo-Aryan language called Sheikhgal, or Watali.

The Shupir Watals, who claim to have been also known as Hamādānī Sheikh, are of uncertain origin. They are found mainly in the areas of Srinagar, Tangmarg, Baramulla and Sopore. They speak an Indo-Aryan language known as Sheikha gal or Watali.

== Present circumstances ==
According to 2001 Census of India, the Watal numbered 169, although their total numbers are probably underreported, as the name Watal carries a stigma. This is seen by the fact that their entrance to temples and shrines was restricted, although this is no longer practiced, there are still occasionally prevented from entering places of worship. They are strictly endogamous, and prefer marrying close relatives. In general, their customs are similar to other Kashmiri Muslims, and the Watal are Sunni.

== See also ==
- List of Scheduled Castes in Jammu and Kashmir
