= Sheikhgal =

Indo-Aryan language of Jammu and Kashmir

- Watali
- Opedigal
- Native to: India
- Region: Kashmir Valley
- Ethnicity: Watal
- Language family: Indo-European: Indo-Iranian; Indo-Aryan; (unclassified); Sheikhgal

Language codes
- ISO 639-3: None (mis)
- Glottolog: None

Sheikhgal or Watali is an unclassified Indo-Aryan language of Jammu and Kashmir, India. Its speakers, the formerly nomadic Watals, are found throughout Kashmir, particularly in the districts of Srinagar (Parimpora, Nowhatta, Dargah, Natipora, Hawal), Baramulla (Bandipora, Khawja Bagh, Sopore and Tangmarg), Pulwama (Lolaab and Lassipora) and Kupwara (Kanthpora, Kulgam, Haihama, Magam, Handwara, Tarathpora). Among its speakers the language is also known as Opedigal or Phiri kathi.

Although attitudes towards the language are generally negative, the community is compact and Sheikhgal is the dominant language within the home. However, in other domains (market, workplace etc.) the language of wider communication Kashmiri is the preferred choice, even with other speakers of Sheikhgal. Within the family, there is a slight shift away from using Sheikhgal (85% of those interviewed by Mullick speak Sheikhgal with their spouses but only 69% do so with their children).

== Phonology ==
=== Vowels ===
	Front-Central	Near-back/Back
Close	iː	uː
Near-close	ɪ	ʊ
Close-mid	eː	oː
Mid	ə	
Open-mid	ɛː	ɔː
Open	aː	

=== Consonants ===
		Labial	Dental/ Alveolar	Retroflex	Post-alv.	Palatal	Velar	Uvular
Nasal		m	n	ɳ		ɲ	ŋ	
Stop/ Affricate	voiceless	p	t̪	ʈ	t͡ʃ		k	q
Stop/ Affricate	voiced	b	d̪	ɖ	d͡ʒ		ɡ	ɢ
Fricative	voiceless	f	s		ʃ	ç	x	
Fricative	voiced	v	z		ʒ	ʝ	ɣ	
Rhotic			ɾ~r	ɽ				
Lateral			l	ɭ				

== Bibliography ==
- Mullick, Aban Parvaz (2003). A sociolinguistic study of Sheikhgal (MPhil). University of Kashmir. Archived from the original on 2016-05-24.
- Safdar, Rahila (2014). "Sheikha Gal". In Devy, G. N.; Koul, Omkar N. (eds.). The languages of Jammu & Kashmir. People's linguistic survey of India. Vol. 12. New Delhi: Orient Blackswan. pp. 279–83. ISBN 978-81-250-5516-7.
