= Ogmuna =

Ogmuna Ogmun
- Village
- Location in Jammu and Kashmir, India Ogmuna (India)
- Coordinates: 34.06°N 74.50°E
- Country: India
- Union territory: Jammu and Kashmir
- District: Baramulla

Government
  - Body: Jammu and Kashmir Legislative Assembly
  - Rank: 2

Population (2022)
  - Total: 2,133

Languages
  - Official: Kashmiri, Urdu, Hindi, Dogri, English
  - Spoken: Pahadi
- Time zone: UTC+5:30 (IST)
- PIN: 193403

Ogmuna or Ogmun is a village known as the oldest village of the tehsil Tangmarg in the Baramulla district of the Indian union territory of Jammu and Kashmir.

According to Census 2011 information the location code or village code of Ogmuna village is 002688. Ogmuna village is located in Tangmarg tehsil of Baramula district in Jammu and Kashmir, India. It is situated 7 km away from sub-district headquarter Tangmarg (tehsildar office) and 32 km away from district headquarter Baramulla.
