= Sansi people =

Nomadic tribe in India

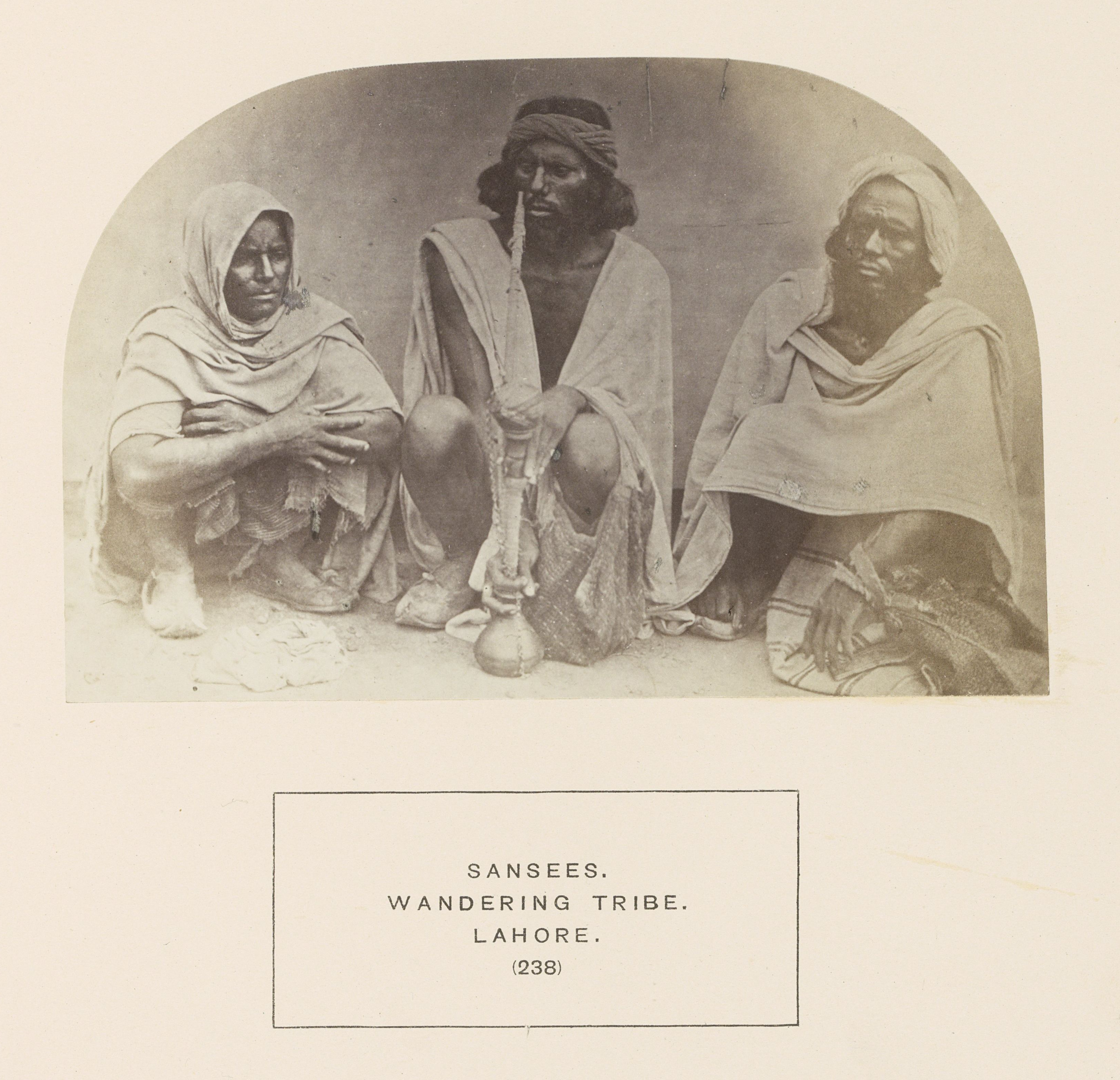
Portrait of three unknown people of the Sansi tribe of Lahore with a water pipe, ca.1862–72

The Sansi or Sansis are a nomadic tribe, originally located in the Rajasthan area of northwestern India, but expelled in the 13th century by Muslim invaders and now spread to the states of Rajasthan, Haryana, Punjab as well as scattered throughout India. They are often confused with other ethnic groups called Sansi, as Sansi is a widespread name in South Asia.

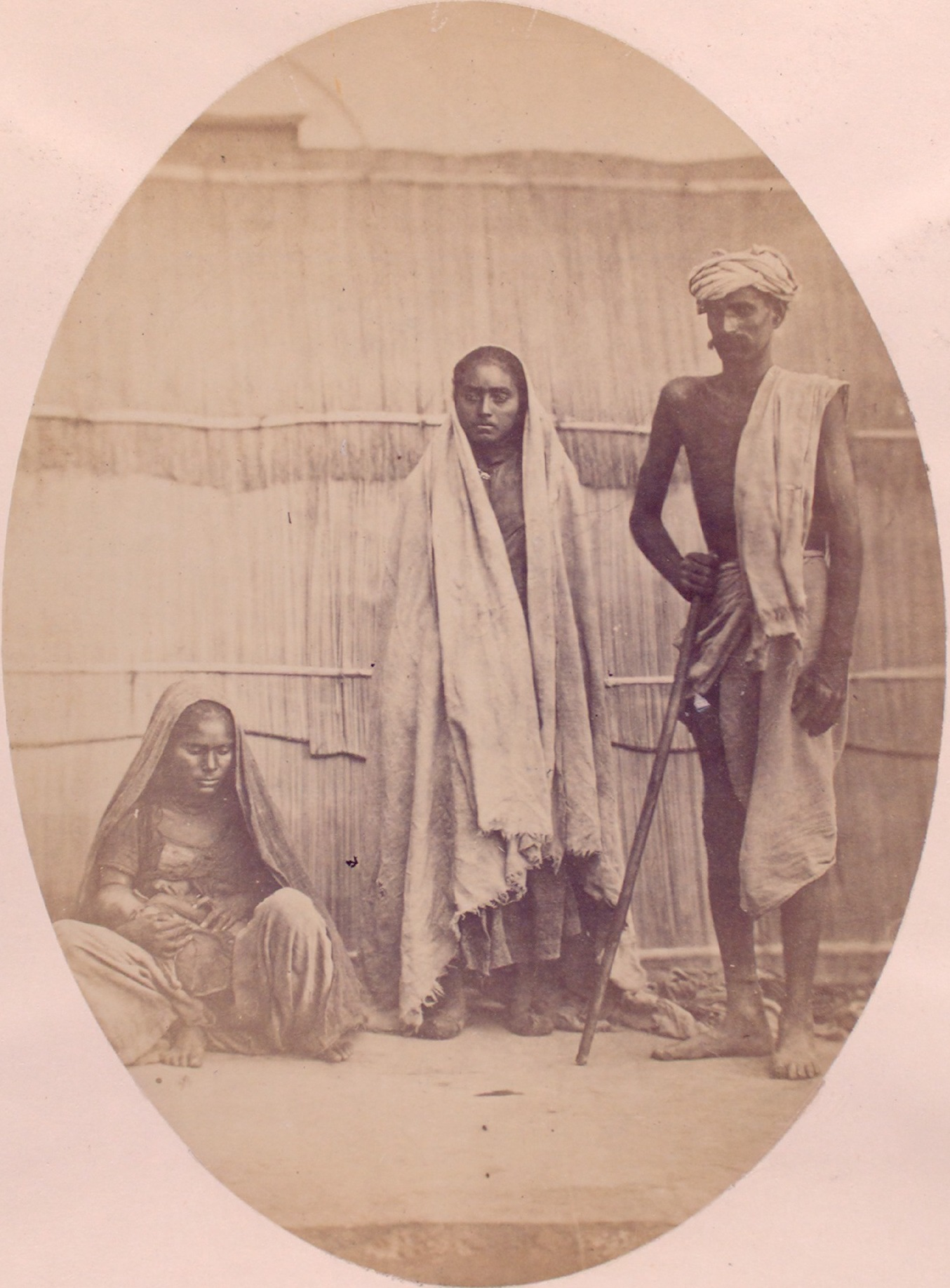
Sansi people in pre-independence India.

== History and origin ==
The Sansis were considered the most prominent criminal tribe in Punjab, with an estimated population of 25,800 in 1912. The British believed other tribes, such as the Baurias and Harnis, were offshoots of the Sansis, who claimed to have originated from Rajput ancestry. Despite acknowledging their ancestry, the British constantly emphasised the Sansis' "degraded" status through stereotypical descriptions. Their religion, primarily a form of Hinduism, was considered primitive, mixed, and debased. After the Criminal Tribes Act was imposed, the Sansi were labelled down to a very pitiful position.

== Language ==
Their language is Sansiboli, or Bhilki too that is a highly endangered Indo-Aryan language of the Central group; total speakers in India number 60,000 (2002) and in Pakistan 20,000. Their traditional occupations vary, from trading to farming.

== History ==
During British rule in India they were placed under the Criminal Tribes Act 1871, hence stigmatized for a long time, after independence, however, they were denotified in 1952. As the Sansiya, they were recorded in Uttar Pradesh in the 2011 Census of India. There they were a Scheduled Caste, with a population of 5689.

== Demographics ==
Sansi in Punjab by Districts (2011)
Districts	2011 India census	
Districts	Sansi Caste Population	%
Amritsar	19,237	0.77%
Barnala	2,159	0.36%
Bathinda	2,232	0.16%
Faridkot	1,647	0.27%
Fatehgarh Sahib	2,015	0.34%
Firozpur	10,376	0.51%
Gurdaspur	18,248	0.79%
Hoshiarpur	2,731	0.17%
Jalandhar	9,904	0.45%
Kapurthala	2,056	0.25%
Ludhiana	11,180	0.32%
Mansa	1,131	0.15%
Moga	1,382	0.14%
Sri Muktsar Sahib	2,982	0.33%
Patiala	5,743	0.3%
Rupnagar	391	0.06%
Sahibzada Ajit Singh Nagar	1600	0.16%
Sangrur	7,701	0.64%
Nawanshahr	1,952	0.32%
Tarn Taran	17,534	1.57%
