= Ferozpora =

Ferojpora Ferojpur Ferozpora
- Village
- Location in Jammu and Kashmir, India Ferojpora (India)
- Coordinates: 34°03′33″N 74°25′28″E
- Country: India
- Union Territory: Jammu and Kashmir
- District: Baramulla

Languages
  - Official: Kashmiri, Urdu, Hindi, Dogri, English
- Time zone: UTC+5:30 (IST)
- PIN: 193402
- Telephone code: 01954

Ferojpora, also known as Ferojpura, Ferojpur, Ferozpora or Ferozpur, is a village in the Baramulla district of Jammu and Kashmir, India. It is situated on the bank of Nalla Ferozpora and is 1 kilometre (0.62 mi) from the town of Tangmarg, of which it is a revenue village, and around 39 kilometres (24 mi) from Srinagar.
