= Criminal Tribes Act =

Legislation in British India

The Criminal Tribes' Act, 1871
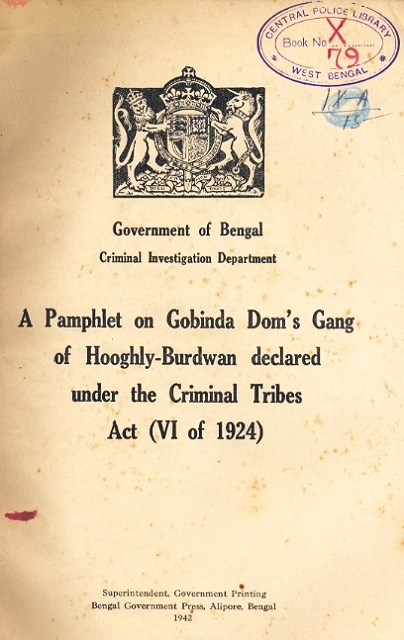
- A Government of Bengal, CID pamphlet, on Gobinda Dom's Gang, under the Criminal Tribes Act (VI of 1924), dated 1942.

British India
- Long title: Criminal Tribes Act
- Citation: Act No. XXVII of 1871
- Enacted: 12 October 1871
- Status: Repealed

Since the 1870s, various pieces of colonial legislation in India during British rule were collectively called the Criminal Tribes Act (CTA). Such legislations criminalised entire communities by designating them and their members as habitual criminals.

The first CTA, the Criminal Tribes Act 1871, was applied mostly in North India, before it was extended to the Bengal Presidency and other areas in 1876, and updated to the Criminal Tribes Act 1911, which included the Madras Presidency. The Act went through several amendments in the next decade, and, finally, the 1924 version incorporated all of them.

At the time of Indian independence in 1947, thirteen million people in 127 communities were subject to the legislation. They were subject to compulsory registration and a pass system which limited their movement and where they could reside. The Criminal Tribes Act 1924 was repealed in August 1949 and former "criminal tribes" were denotified in 1952, when the Act was replaced with the Habitual Offenders Act 1952. In 1961 state governments started releasing lists of such tribes.

Today, there are 313 Nomadic Tribes and 198 Denotified Tribes of India who continue to face its legacy through continued alienation and stereotyping with the policing and judicial systems and media portrayal.

== Background ==
Terming entire communities as criminals, barbarians, vagabond, or thieves is rooted in Indian caste discrimination. Anthropologist Anastasia Piliavsky argues that the stereotype of 'criminal tribes' has a deep history and predates colonial legislation in India. She adds,

the hypnotism of this bias [colonial construct of criminal tribes] is extraordinary and leaves scores of learned and talented historians tone-deaf to voices that were there before, during, and after the Europeans reached, and quit the subcontinent.

Ancient and medieval literature from the Indian subcontinent have mentions of outlawed tribes. These include the Vedic Aranyaka, epics of Ramayana and Mahabharata, ancient and medieval storytelling of Katha, dramas, and Jataka tales. In these texts, roads, mountain passes, and forest pathways are teemed with robber bands waiting to prey on merchants and travellers. They come from the forests, which are at the periphery of civilisation in Brahmanic cosmology. They are at 'the cosmic fringe, the wasteland, a socially negative space home to various outsiders to ordinary moral, ritual, legal, and social life.' Sage Manu wrote of them as living outside the village, wearing garments of the dead, eating their food from broken dishes, and wandering from place to place. Historian Divya Cherian in her eighteenth-century history of the Kingdom of Marwar reiterates the precolonial roots of 'criminal tribes.' The erstwhile Rathor state attributed an inherent tendency towards animal killing and crimes of Thori and Bavris communities. Archival records show the anxiety of Rathor administrators who viewed these communities as inclined to steal and raid villages. While other communities in the kingdom also engaged in raiding, they were not classified as inherently criminal. Therefore, Cherian argues that it was 'a complex of factors—landlessness, poverty, and the resultant martial weakness—in addition to a hereditary association with theft that led to a caste's perception as criminal.'

Piliavsky also summarises these as socio-political decisions with varied purposes, prior to colonial legislations and subsequent list-making,

Authors of ancient treatises, Mughal rulers, European travellers in precolonial India, and itinerant groups (today and in the past) all called on the idea of hereditary robber tribes to pursue a wide range of distinctive purposes.

Nevertheless, colonial rule advanced these stereotypes of congenital criminality to cement vertical power relations. In addition, contemporary discourse of crime in Britain also influenced perception and response in the larger colonies like India; class and caste seemed to converge in legal discourse and legislations in India.

== History of the colonial laws ==
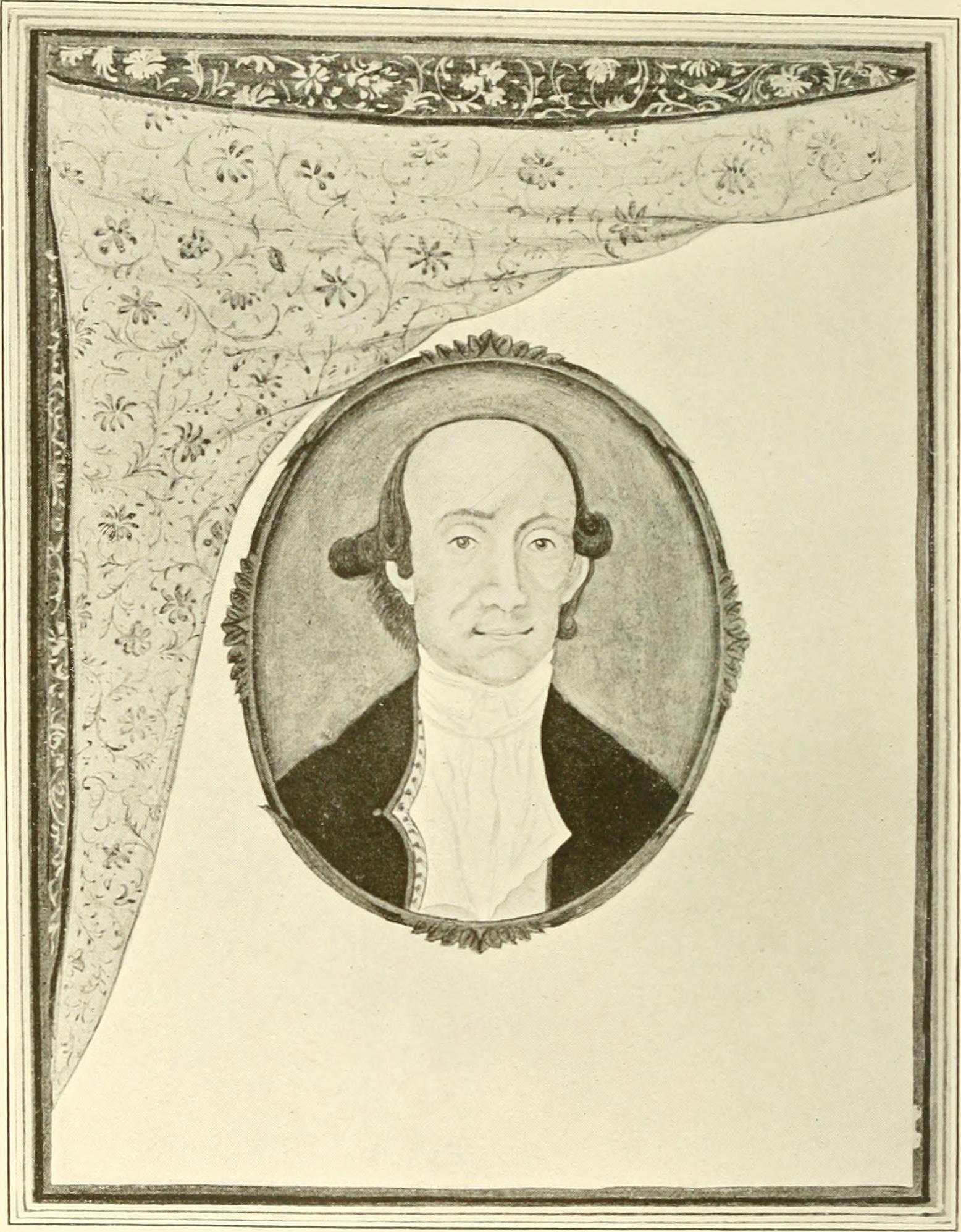
Governor Warren Hastings

=== Origins ===
Professor Henry Schwarz notes that, as early as 1772, under the governorship of Warren Hastings, legal regulations allowed for punishment of an offender's family and village. It was rooted in the contemporary jurisprudence that criminality was hereditary in India and criminals were such by profession and belonged to like-minded fraternity. The growth of gang robbery by lowland villagers in the late eighteenth century was significantly due to the Cornwallis administrative reforms rather than changes in the economic production patters. The reforms altered land revenue obligations and tenant-landlord relations as well as the police and judicial systems in colonial India. The Regulation XII of 1793 legislated that 'wandering' communities could be put to work on roads or otherwise forcibly settled down. British officials were encouraged to compile lists of these attributes pertaining to each community and,

classify them on the basis of their usefulness to the state. Observable differences became inherent tendencies. When combined with poorly understood Indian notions of community, such tendencies became essential, unchanging certainties.

=== The Thuggee Acts ===
The Thuggee Act of 1836 set the legal precedent for the Criminal Tribes Act 1871. Colonial records characterises thuggee with five qualities—strangulation, secrecy, organisation, antiquity, and religiosity. These distinguished them from other categories of criminality and provided the basis of the 1836 act. Nevertheless, these understandings and common parlance precede British arrival in India. The Thuggee Act provided the legal jurisprudence to understanding crime in India as organised and hereditary in the person of a thug. The law allowed individuals to be convicted based solely on affiliation to a criminal group without evidence of having committed a crime.

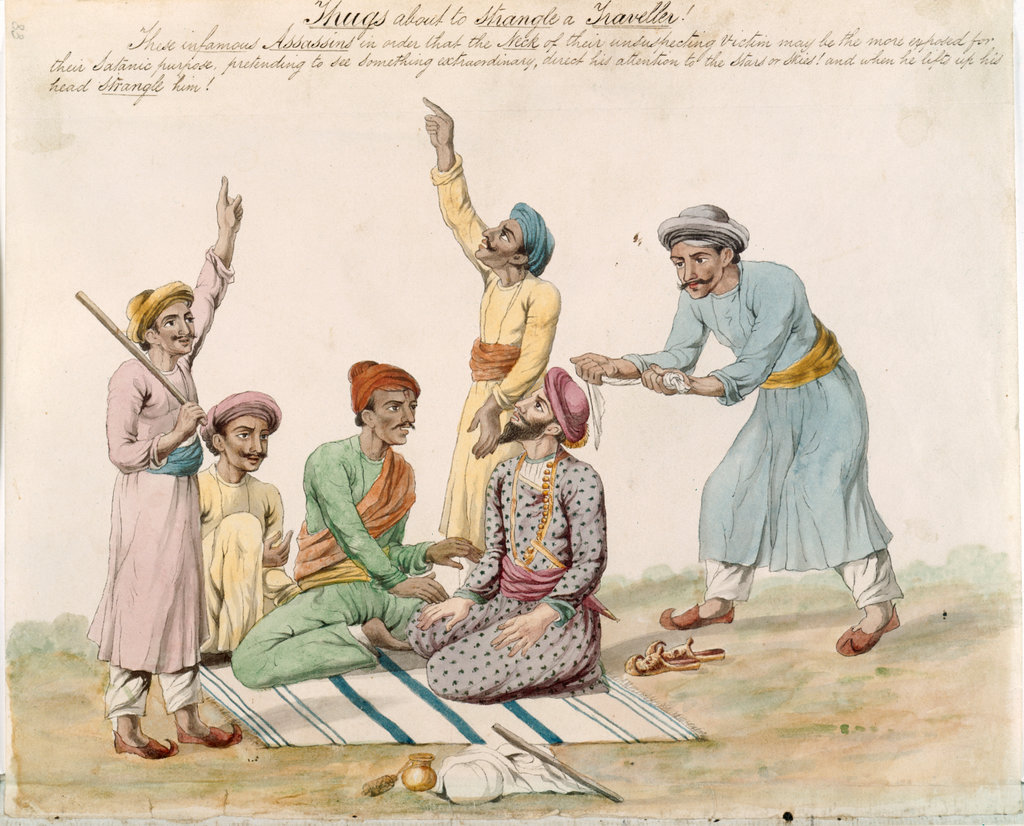
Colonial depiction of thugs attacking a traveller.

The first mention of thuggee in the British archives is during murder investigations in 1809. In the Indian region of Etawah, the magistrate report of James Law to the Commander-in-Chief William Dowdeswell describing the involved thugs as strongly leagued together, organised, ancient, and secretive. In the same year, another report by Judge T. Brooke to Dowdeswell further defined thuggee as 'a crime in which unsuspecting travellers were approached in disguise, strangled with a scarf or catgut string, looted, and hidden.' The same definition was emphasised in Richard Sherwood's report in 1819 as well as that these groups were highly diverse, involving multiple castes, religions, and ethnicities. In 1830, William Henry Sleeman anonymously published an article which sealed the understanding that it was a religious practice. Sleeman, thereafter, wrote three books on thuggee.

=== Colonial administration ===
Simultaneously, the late nineteenth century was an important turning point for British legal discourse with far reaching political and ideological consequences. Public interest in criminality was growing; crime and criminals increasingly became part of popular fact and fiction. Several reasons were cited for criminality, including alcohol, poverty, urbanisation, overcrowding, and decline in morality. Darwin's theories of evolution also provided for new social and political discussions. One school of thought attributed crime to genetic traits transmitted over generations. It provided for a deflection from serious enquiries to the causes of crime.

Sociologist Meena Radhakrishna argues that moral and material progress was demanded to be at a faster pace through a set of new social and political policies in the colonies. She also notes that after the revolt of 1857, many tribal chiefs were labelled traitors and considered rebellious. One of the important persons who participated in the revolt was Banke Chamar.

The colonial government found the demarcation between wandering criminal tribes, vagrants, itinerants, travelling tradesmen, nomads, gypsies, and eunuchs (hijras) difficult to manage. They were all grouped together, and their subsequent generations were labelled a law and order problem for the state. Though various marginalised caste groups were added to the list, the colonial government used the category of 'tribe' for rhetorical and administrative purposes. This categorisation evoked qualities of 'wildness' and 'savagery' in the way that caste seemed to fail.

Under these acts, ethnic or social communities in India were defined as "addicted to the systematic commission of non-bailable offences" such as thefts, and were registered by the government. Adult males of the groups were forced to report weekly to local police, and had restrictions on their movement imposed.

The colonial government prepared a list of "criminal castes", and all members registered in these castes by caste-census were restricted in terms of regions they could visit, move about in or people they could socialise with. In certain regions, entire caste groups were presumed guilty by birth, arrested, children separated from their parents, and held in penal colonies or quarantined without conviction or due process.

=== Proposal and justification ===
Despite previous regulations, until 1871, no community or caste were collectively classified as criminal. In 1871-72, the upper castes convicts featured more in proportion to their population compared to the backward castes. However, after the revolt of 1857, the propensity of the Indigenous tribes to revolt, and with weapons was duly noted by the British colonial officers. T. V. Stephens, the chief architect of the 1871 law, and a member of the Law and Order Commission, while presenting his diabolic law, said,

The special feature of India is the caste system. As it is, traders go by caste. A family of carpenters will be carpenters, a century or five centuries...Viewed from this angle, the meaning of professional is clear. It means tribes whose ancestors were criminal from time immemorial, who are themselves destined by the usage of caste to commit crime and whose descendants will be offenders against law until the whole tribe is exterminated or accounted for in the manner of the thugs. When a man tells you that he is an offender against law, he has been so from the beginning, and will be so to the end, reform is impossible, for it is his trade, his caste, I may almost say his religion to commit crime.

James Fitzjames Stephen testified, "When we speak of professional criminals, we...(mean) a tribe whose ancestors were criminals from time immemorial, who are themselves destined by the usage of caste to commit crime, and whose descendants will be offenders against the law, until the whole tribe is exterminated or accounted for in manner of thugs". The archives of the Thuggee and Dacoity Department were repeatedly cited to evidence the existence of 'criminal tribes' and the Department was a key player in the presentation of a crime plague perpetrated by itinerant and semi-nomadic communities. While very few officials expressed concern about endowing the police with too much power, most British administrators approved of the draconian measures.

The British Government appointed W. W. Hunter, a senior official, to undertake 'a great stock-taking' after hundred years of British rule in India. He noted that India had become a 'more secure, more prosperous' country and 'thing, dakaiti, and predatory castes [were] suppressed' amongst other achievements.

== Scope ==
The Criminal Tribes Act was one of the many laws passed by the British colonial government that applied to Indians based on their religion and caste identification. The Criminal Tribes Act and its provisions used the term Tribes, which included castes within their scope. This terminology was preferred for various reasons, including Muslim sensitivities that considered castes by definition Hindu, and preferred Tribes as a more generic term that included Muslims. The castes and tribes "notified" under the Act were labelled as Criminal Tribes for their so-called "criminal tendencies". As a result, anyone born in these communities across the country was presumed as a "born criminal", irrespective of their criminal precedents. This gave the police sweeping powers to arrest them, control them, and monitor their movements.

Once a tribe was officially notified, its members had no recourse to repeal such notices under the judicial system. From then on, their movements were monitored through a system of compulsory registration and passes, which specified where the holders could travel and reside, and district magistrates were required to maintain records of all such people.

The Act was initially applied only to the North-Western Provinces, Oudh State, and Punjab. When the colonial state annexed Punjab, it posed numerous challenges due to its geographical location and proximity to Afghanistan and the restive northern regions of India. The crime statistics of the 1860s were inconsistent, with occasional fluctuations that colonial administrators attributed to different reasons, such as crop failure and the nomadic lifestyle of certain tribes. During the 1860s, colonial lawmaking in Punjab was primarily aimed at addressing the issue of criminal activities by certain tribes, which presented a significant challenge for the provincial administration. These criminal tribes were often perceived as a social evil and a threat to the economic mainstay of the populace, which was agriculture. The colonial officials recognised the importance of maintaining law and order in the province and introduced various legal statutes, such as the Criminal Tribes Act (CTA), to achieve this goal. The CTA aimed to target the most accessible and visible suspects. These criminal tribes were already socially ostracised due to their lack of 'animal capital' or 'land capital,' which determined one's social status in pre-colonial Punjab. This social structure was formalised under the capitalist modes of production introduced by the colonial state (Safdar 20).

An inquiry was set up in 1883, to investigate the need for extending the Act to the rest of India, and received an affirmative response. 1897 saw another amendment to the Act, wherein local governments were empowered to establish separate "reformatory" settlements, for tribal boys from age four to eighteen years, away from their parents.

In 1911, it was enacted in Madras Presidency as well, bringing entire India into the jurisdiction of this law. The revised version of the act then affected 1,400,000 people belonging to the nomadic communities, especially Yerukalas, Koravars, and Korachas. In the same year, it was applied in Bombay Presidency.

In 1908, special 'settlements' were constructed for the notified tribes where they had to perform hard labour. With subsequent amendments to the Act, punitive penalties were increased, and fingerprinting of all members of the criminal tribe was made compulsory, such tight control according to many scholars was placed to ensure that no future revolts could take place.

It was subsequently extended to the rest of British India, in part or its entirety.

=== Public support ===
The British government was able to summon a large amount of public support, including the nationalist press, for the excesses committed, because the Criminal Tribes Act was posed widely as a social reform measure which reformed criminals through work. However, when they tried to make a living like everybody else, they did not find work outside the settlement because of public prejudice and ostracisation.

== Social impact ==
=== Nomads vs settlers ===
Historian David Arnold has suggested that because many of these tribes were small communities of poor, low-caste and nomadic people living on the fringes of the society, living as petty traders, pastoralists, gypsies, hill and forest dwelling tribes, they did not conform to the prevailing European standards of living, which involved settled agriculture and waged labour. Those with nomadic lifestyles were seen as a menace to 19th century society and required control, or at least surveillance.

Historian Jessica Hinchy argues that the laws also repositioned families in space; it geographically redistributed and immobilised population on the basis of family units.

=== Social engineering ===
The measure was a part of a wider attempt at social engineering which saw, for example, the categorisation of castes as being "agricultural" or "martial" as a means of facilitating the distribution of property or recognising which groups were loyal to the colonial government and therefore suitable for military recruitment, respectively.

Elsewhere the concept of Reformatory Schools for such people had already been initiated by mid-19th century by social reformers, such as Mary Carpenter (1807–1877), who was the first to coin the term "dangerous classes".

Because it came to be thought that behavior was hereditary rather than learned, crime became ethnic, and what was merely social determinism till then became biological determinism.

=== Resettlement of tribes ===
Many of the tribes were "settled" in villages under the police guard, whose job was to ensure that no registered member of the tribe was absent without notice. Also imposition of punitive police posts on the villages with history of "misconduct" was also common.

The Aziz Nagar settlement in South Arcot District was opened on 22 September 1913 to deal with the so-called criminal tribes of the Madras presidency, including Veppur Parayars and Piramalai Kallar, in South Arcot district. Some of the peoples of Veppur Paraiyar and Piramalai Kallar were arrested under the Criminal Tribes Act and formed the Aziz Nagar settlement. The oppressed people in the Aziz Nagar settlement were without even basic facilities and food. T. M. Jambulingam Mudaliar visited the Aziz Nagar settlement unofficially and provided food and basic necessities to affected people there. Jambulinga Mudaliar vehemently opposed the Criminal Tribes Act, but only the Criminal Tribes Act against the Vanniyar Padayachi of the South Arcot was repealed.

In the coming decades, to evade prosecution under the Act, many of these notified tribes took up nomadic existence, living on the fringes of society.

== Victims ==
Professor of history Ramnarayan Rawat states that the criminal-by-birth castes under this Act included initially gujjar and lodhis but expanded by the late 19th century to include most of Chamars, as well as Sanyasis and hill tribes. Other major British census based caste groups that were included as criminal-by-birth under this Act included Bowreah, Budducks, Bedyas, Domes, Dormas, Gujjar, Rebari, Pasi, Dasads, Nonias, Moosaheers, Rajwars, Gahsees Boayas, Dharees, Sowakhyas. and One such measure was the Criminal Tribes Act of 1871, under the provisions of which Meenas (Mina)were placed in the first list of the Act in 1872 in Patiala and East Punjab States Union, Rajasthan and Punjab

Hundreds of Hindu communities were brought under the Criminal Tribes Act. By 1931, the colonial government listed 237 criminal castes and tribes under the act in the Madras Presidency alone.

=== Women ===
Women from de-notified and nomadic communities were victimised after CTA and often faced severe human rights violations and abuse of power by various actors, including law enforcement authorities, politicians, landlords, and the village communities. These women are particularly vulnerable to exploitation and abuse due to their marginalised status, and they are often victimised by every one of them. They face the misuse of power by the police and the caste communities in the villages, who arrest or illegally confine them for crimes others commit. Women and children are not spared, as they become easy targets of the lustful and corrupt personnel in the law enforcing machinery and the landlords in the villages. As a result, women of these communities suffer from physical, emotional, and psychological trauma, perpetuating a cycle of marginalisation, vulnerability, and exploitation. The extent of these human rights violations is evident in the community survey, reflecting the urgent need for action to address this systemic issue (Borker 9). For example, a woman of the Nandiwale tribe, who makes a living selling utensils and cutlery, was subjected to a violent attack in the Indapur block of Pune district. She was accused of stealing silver spoons from a household and, without any inquiry, was stripped and beaten. Her belonging to a tribe that was once deemed criminal was deemed sufficient evidence of her guilt. Shockingly, the police did not even register a case in this matter (Borker 12).

=== Impact on third gender communities ===
Though it was primarily directed at tribal communities, various incarnations of the Criminal Tribes Act also included provisions limiting the rights of transgender and gender non-conforming individuals and communities in India. Hijras in particular were targeted under the Act.

The Criminal Tribes Act of 1871 created the category of "eunuch" to refer to the many, often unrelated gender non-conforming communities in India, including hijras, khwajasarais, and kotis. The label "eunuch" was used as a catchall term for anyone thought not to conform to traditional British ideals of masculinity, though in reality most of the communities classified as "eunuchs" did not identify as male or female.

Under the Criminal Tribes Act, a eunuch could be either "respectable" or "suspicious." Respectable eunuchs did not engage in "kidnapping, castration or sodomy," while suspicious eunuchs performed in public and wore what British officials classified as female clothes. The Criminal Tribes Act banned all behaviour considered "suspicious," warning that anyone found engaging in traditional hijra activities like public dancing or dressing in women's clothing would be arrested and/or forced to pay a fine.

Colonial authorities claimed that it was necessary for "eunuchs" to be registered under the Act to prevent them from kidnapping children and/or engaging in sodomy. In reality, there was little official evidence of any gender non-conforming communities in India kidnapping children, or of many children living in gender non-conforming communities. The few children that were found to be living with hijras were removed from their care, despite the fact that most of the children did not have any other legal guardians and had been adopted into the hijra community because they were orphans or unwanted by their biological families.

== Reform of the Act ==
This practice became controversial and did not enjoy the support of all British colonial officials. Henry Schwarz, a professor at Georgetown University specialising in the history of colonial and postcolonial India, wrote that this decades-long practice was reversed at the start of the 20th century with the proclamation that people "could not be incarcerated indefinitely on the presumption of [inherited] bad character".

In 1936, Jawaharlal Nehru denouncing the Act commented, "The monstrous provisions of the Criminal Tribes Act constitute a negation of civil liberty. No tribe [can] be classed as criminal as such and the whole principle [is] out of consonance with all civilised principles."

=== Post-independence reforms ===
In January 1947, the Government of Bombay set up a committee, which included B.G. Kher, then Chief Minister Morarji Desai, and Gulzarilal Nanda, to look into the matter of 'criminal tribes'. In 1949, after a long campaign led by Communist leaders such as P. Ramamurthi and P. Jeevanandham, and Forward Bloc leader U. Muthuramalingam Thevar, who had led many agitations in the villages since 1929 urging the people to defy the CTA, the number of tribes listed under the CTA was reduced. Other provincial governments soon followed suit.

The Act was repealed in August 1949, which resulted in 2,300,000 tribals being decriminalised. The committee appointed in the same year by the central government to study the utility of the existence of this law, reported in 1950 that the system violated the spirit of the Indian constitution.

A massive crime wave after the criminal tribes were denotified led to a public outcry. The Habitual Offenders Act (HOA) (1952) was enacted in the place of CTA; it states that a habitual offender is one who has been a victim of subjective and objective influences and has manifested a set practice in crime, and also presents a danger to society. The HOA effectively re-stigmatised the already marginalised "criminal tribes".

== Continued effects ==
Many of these denotified tribes continued to carry considerable social stigma from the Act, and come under the purview of the new 'Prevention of Anti-Social Activity Act' (PASA). Many of them have been denied the status of Scheduled Castes (SC), Scheduled Tribes (ST) or Other Backward Classes (OBC), which would have allowed them avail Reservation under Indian law, which reserves seats for them in government jobs and educational institutions, thus most of them are still living Below Poverty Line and in sub-human conditions.

Over the course of the century since its passing, the criminal identity attached to certain tribes by the Act, was internalised not just by the society, but also by the police, whose official methodology, even after repeal of the Act, often reflected the characteristics of manifestation of an era initiated by the Act, a century ago, where characteristic of crimes committed by certain tribes were closely watched, studied and documented.

The new Act simply re-lists the "Criminal Tribes" as denotified tribes. Today the social category generally known as the denotified and nomadic tribes includes approximately 60 million people in India.

== International opposition ==
The National Human Rights Commission recommended repeal of the 1952 Habitual Offenders Act in February 2000. Later in March 2007, the UN's anti-discrimination body Committee on the Elimination of Racial Discrimination (CERD), noted that "the so-called denotified and nomadic which are listed for their alleged 'criminal tendencies' under the former Criminal Tribes Act (1871), continue to be stigmatised under the Habitual Offenders Act (1952) (art. 2 (1)), and asked India to repeal the Habitual Offenders Act (1952) and effectively rehabilitate the denotified and nomadic tribes. According to the body, since much of 'Habitual Offenders Act (1952)' is derived from the earlier 'Criminal Tribes Act 1871', it doesn't show a marked departure in its intent, only gives the formed notified tribes a new name i.e. Denotified tribes, hence the stigma continues so does the oppression, as the law is being denounced on two counts, first that "all human beings are born free and equal", and second that it negates a valuable principle of the criminal justice system – innocent until proven guilty.

In 2008, the National Commission for Denotified, Nomadic and Semi-Nomadic Tribes (NCDNSNT) of Ministry of Social Justice and Empowerment recommended that same reservations as available to Scheduled Castes and Scheduled Tribes be extended to around 110 million people of denotified, nomadic or semi-nomadic tribes in India; the commission further recommended that the provisions of the Scheduled Caste and Scheduled Tribe (Prevention of Atrocities) Act, 1989 be applicable to these tribes also. Today, many governmental and non-governmental bodies are involved in the betterment of these denotified tribes through various schemes and educational programs.

== In films ==
In postcolonial India, movies have been made on these communities with varied depictions.

T. J. Gnanavel's 2021 Tamil film Jai Bhim discussed the injustices stemming from the legislative and social prejudices meted to these tribes in present India. A 2017 Tamil film, Theeran Adhigaaram Ondru, is based around the Operation Bawaria in Tamil Nadu depicting some members of a nomadic tribe as dacoits. The second season of the Indian streaming series Delhi Crime depicts the still existing prejudice and abuse of "denotified tribes" in Indian police, politics, and society.

At least two short films have made on the contemporary situation of denotified tribes in India. Mahasweta Devi: Witness, Advocate, Writer (2001) by Shashwati Talukdar is based on the life of social activist and Magsaysay Award winner, Mahasweta Devi, who worked with these communities for over three decades. Devi's work was influential in the 2005 short documentary movie Acting Like a Thief by P. Kerim Friedman and Shashwati Talukdar on a Chhara tribal theatre group in Ahmedabad, India. The community after being notified as 'natural criminals' in 1871 were imprisoned in a labour camp near the town.
