= Bangali (caste) =

Regions with significant populations
- India
- Uttar Pradesh: 38,035
- Uttarakhand: 22,015
- Haryana: 4,727
- Punjab: 4,690
- Himachal Pradesh: 4,294

Languages
- Hindi, Punjabi, Urdu and Haryanvi and Nepali

Religion
- Hinduism, Sunni Islam, Sikhism

Related ethnic groups
- Sansi, Sapera, Kanjar

The Bangali may refer to a Scheduled Caste found in northern India. They are one of the many nomadic groupings found in India, and have customs similar to other nomadic communities such as the Kanjar.

== Origin ==
The Bangali are semi-nomadic tribal grouping, who are said to be Sansiya by origin. They are said to have separated from the Sansi parent group when they took up snake charming. The majority of the Bangali are now settled, occupying their settlements of reed huts at the edge of established villages. They are found mainly in the Doab region, with two clusters, one in Muzaffarnagar District in the villages of Bhokaredhi, Kamhera, and Kithora and the other in Bijnor District, in the villages of Raoli and Seemla Fatehpur. The Bangali speak their own dialect, which contains substantial Punjabi loanwords.

In Haryana, traditions point to the fact that they originally belonged to the Deha community, who took begging and snake charming, and as such were ostracised from the parent community. The Bangali in Haryana speak Haryanvi, and live in multi-caste villages.

In Punjab, the Bangali are also known as Sapela, Sipado or Jogi, and are traditionally associated with snake charming. Like many other nomadic peripatetic castes, the Bangali claim a Rajput origin. In this new environment, the community took to living by hunting and trapping. Denzil Ibbetson considered the Bangali simply to be a sub-group of the Kanjar community. In Punjab, they are found mainly in the districts of Jalandhar and Gurdaspur, and they speak Punjabi.

== Present circumstances ==
Distribution of SC Bangali in India

The Bangali are strictly endogamous community, but have no system of gotras. They are generally divided into the Hindu and Muslim groupings, with no intermarriage between the two groupings. The Hindu Bangali trace their ancestry to a Shivai Ram Rajput, who is said to have immigrated from Bengal, while the Muslim Bangali claim to be Lodhi Pathans, who are said to have come from Bengal. Most Hindu Bangalis were followers of Sakhi Sarwar, however most are now orthodox Hindu. The Muslim branch are Sunni Muslims.

The Bangali are a landless community, and are involved mainly in the rearing of donkeys, ox, fox, buffalos and goats, as well as collecting roots and other minor forest products. A great number are now employed as agricultural labourers. Each of their settlement contains an informal caste council, known as a biradari panchayat. The panchayat acts as instrument of social control, dealing with issues such as divorce and adultery.

=== Haryana ===
In Haryana, the Bangali are entirely Hindu, and have a village deity called Khera. They are further divided into clans, called gotras. Their main clans are the Gandhila, Guar, Bhambi, Panjpasia, Marar, Ladar, Kalandar and bajania. Most Bangali are still employed as snake charmers, with a small minority who are now daily wage labourers.

=== Punjab, India ===
The Bangali of Punjab are entirely Hindu, and worship Guru Gorakh Nath and Guga Pir. Although marriages take place within the community, occasionally there is intermarriage with the Gandhila and Dhea castes. They also practice clan and camp exogamy, although there is no system of hypergamy, as all their clans are of equal status. Their main clans are the Mehra, Chauhan, Kira, Aag and Potry. The Bangali live in small groups of ten to thirteen families and move in search of food from place to place. Their settlements consist of huts, which can accommodate a small family. Each Bangali camp consists of people who closely related. The Government of India has begun a policy of settling the Bangali, and a settlement has been at Dugri. Most Bangali are still involved snake charming, with a small number now employed as agricultural labourers. The community is extremely marginalised both socially and economically, and as such has been granted Scheduled Caste status.

=== Uttar Pradesh ===
The 2011 Census of India for Uttar Pradesh showed the Bangali population as 38,035.
