= Tribal multiculturalism =

Caste in South Asia

Tribal multiculturalism refers to the caste heterogeneity within some tribes in South Asia. While scholarship and popular images of Indian tribes have often emphasized the 'primitiveness' of their social organization (called 'backwards' in Indian government language) or their social egalitarianism, researchers have long been pointing to processes of tribalization and the partial integration of Dalit and low-caste groups within tribal society.

== Overview ==
The recent boom of tribalism studies is the US and other western countries defines modern tribalism as political partisanship and in-group xenophobia. These discourses build off of colonial sources and outmoded anthropological accounts of tribes as representing primitiveness, simplicity, savagery, and closed social structure. However, for many decades Indian sociologists have neutrally described tribalizing practices as the incorporation of peripheral caste groups into tribal formations. Recently, grassroots and indigenous activist-scholars in India have put forward Scheduled Tribe Dalit (STD) to indicate an intersectional identity of low-caste groups (called Dalits or Scheduled Castes) within tribes or petitioning to be reclassified as tribal. These STDs often face structural discriminations and casteism; however, tracking their social precarity as tribal or tribal aspirants opens up a new perspective on Indian tribes as heterogeneous, multicultural and flexibly integrating Dalits in some circumstances. Because of a lack of scholarship, it is unknown how many of over 700 tribes in India are undergoing tribal redefinition or have integrated outside castes. Moreover, there are over 2,000 communities petitioning the Indian state for Scheduled Tribe status. It is unknown how the process of tribalizing to meet state categories and criteria for affirmative action inclusion is reshaping tribal social organization and making news spaces for tribal multiculturalism. For examples of this in scholarship, see the caste study of the Gorkhas in Darjeeling or the Gaddis in Himachal Pradesh.

== See also ==
- Tribal casteism
