= Sippi people =

Sub-caste of Gaddi people

Sippi
𑚨𑚮𑚞𑚶𑚞𑚯

Total population
- 32873

Regions with significant populations
- Himachal Pradesh: 26,907
- Jammu and Kashmir: 5,966

Languages
- Gaddi

Religion
- Hinduism

Related ethnic groups
- Gaddis, Halis

Sippi or Sipi are nomadic community, who are sub-group of Gaddis and follows Transhumance being a semi-pastoral community. They are concentrated in the Dhauladhar Range of the Pir Panjal Range at the border region of Jammu and Kashmir and Himachal Pradesh. They are considered as the "Weavers of the Gaddis".

== Population ==
The members of community resides primarily in the Bharmour and Churah of Chamba district in Himachal Pradesh and the neighbouring district of Kathua and Doda in Jammu and Kashmir. In Himachal Pradesh, their population was 26,907 and out of which 19,141 resided in Chamba, while in Jammu and Kashmir, their population was 5,966 and out of which 4,663 resided in Kathua as per 2011 census.

== Classification ==
Despite being listed separately by Government of India, they are a part of the broader Gaddi community and considered as one of the bottom most community in the tribal heirarchy and having an internal caste system that consists of the upper castes, which includes Brahmins, Rajputs and Khatris and lower castes, primarily Halis and Sippis. In Chamba, their ancestral profession was rearing of sheep and weaving woollen from sheep hair and were considered as lower in caste heirarchy, along with Halis who were leatherworkers and marginal labourers. Due to their social and economical backwardness, they are recognized as Scheduled Caste in Himachal Pradesh.

In Jammu and Kashmir, they are recognized as an independent tribe from the Gaddis and classified as Scheduled Tribe.
