= Kulhama =

Kulhama Kulhoam
- Village
- Location within Jammu and Kashmir Location within India
- Coordinates: 34.058°N 74.471°E
- Country: India
- Union territory: Jammu and Kashmir
- District: Baramulla
- Tehsil: Tangmarg

Government
  - Type: Panchayati raj
  - Body: Gram panchayat

Population (2011)
  - Total: 531

Languages
  - Official: Kashmiri, Urdu, Hindi, Dogri, English
- Time zone: UTC+5:30 (IST)
- PIN: 193402

Kulhama or Kulhoam is a village situated in Tangmarg tehsil of Baramulla district in the Indian union territory of Jammu and Kashmir. The village is located 42 kilometres from the district headquarters Baramulla and 7 kilometres from the tehsil headquarters Tangmarg.

== Demographics ==
According to the 2011 census of India, Kulhama has a population of 531 people. The literacy rate of Kulhama village was 74.26% compared to 67.16% of Jammu and Kashmir. In Kulhama, Male literacy stands at 82.38% while the female literacy rate is 66.98%.

Demographics (2011 Census)
	Total	Male	Female
Population	531	256	275
Children aged below 6 years	123	63	60
Scheduled caste	0	0	0
Scheduled tribe	0	0	0
Literacy	74.26%	82.38%	66.98%
Workers (all)	100	90	10
Main workers (total)	29	25	4
Marginal workers (total)	71	65	6
Non-workers	431	166	265
