= Rattal =

Hindu caste

The Rattal are a Hindu Rajput caste found in Jammu and Kashmir, India, who are of Suryavanshi clan. According to the 2001 Census of India, their population was 1,913.

They live in the warm and temperate zones of Jammu province in the districts of Kathua, Udhampur, and Reasi.

The Rattal are strictly endogamous and practice clan exogamy. Their main clans include the Sargotra, Lakkotra, Motan, Kaith, Kulsotra and Sundhey (Sandhu). They do not have an informal caste council, which distinguishes them from other Jammu Hindus who tend have elaborate caste councils.

The Rattal have now become landowners, as a result of the land reforms, and the bulk of them are small and marginal farmers. A small minority are still employed as agricultural labourers or involved the manufacture of baskets.

== See also ==
- Saryara
