= Shashwati Talukdar =

Shashwati Talukdar is an India-born academic-filmmaker based in New York City, with more than twelve films and videos to her name, and who has become well known on the international film-making stage, particularly for her documentaries on cultural identity and representation.

Her work has appeared at the Margaret Mead Film Festival, Mediopolis-Berlin, the Whitney Biennial, Kiasma Museum of Art in Helsinki and the Institute of Contemporary Art, Philadelphia and has gained the support of Jerome Foundation, New York State Council on the Arts and Pennsylvania Council on the Arts. In 2002, Talukdar received the James T. Yee Mentorship Award from the Center for Asian American Media, and, then, in 2003, she received the Project Involve Fellowship from IFP/New York.

== Early life ==
Talukdar was born in Dehradun, Uttarakhand, India. to the esteemed S.N Talukdar and artist Monica Talukdar. She is the youngest of three siblings, with Rudranath, her older brother, and Indrani, her older sister. She attended Lady Shri Ram College, Delhi University, and Jamia Millia Islamia University in New Delhi, where she obtained a graduate degree in Mass Communication. She also attended Temple University in Philadelphia, Pennsylvania, for a Masters of Fine Arts in film and media arts. Since then, she has taught at NYU, Arcadia University and Temple University.

== Career ==
She began her career in 1999 as an assistant editor for BBC's television show, Michael Moore Live. Since then, she has worked on other projects for BBC as well as for HBO, Lifetime, Sundance and Cablevision. She runs the production company "Four Nine and Half Pictures," named because Talukdar herself is less than five feet tall. Additionally, she maintains Shashwati's Blog, which she uses to communicate with fans and other bloggers about various topics, including films, culture and social justice issues. Her film Please Don't Beat Me, Sir, tells the story of the Budhan Theatre, a theatre group composed of members of India's Chhara denotified or "criminal" tribe. She is currently living and working in Taiwan with her husband Kerim.

== Filmography ==
1. Any Number You Want
2. Eunuch Alley
3. Geometry Lover
4. Mahasweta Devi
5. My Life as a Poster
6. RetroAction
7. Unable to(Re)member Roop Kanwar
8. Rumination and Advice from Dr. Abbey
9. Snake-Byte
10. Tahini and Tears
11. Bollywood Terror
12. Please Don't Beat Me, Sir!
13. Marriage Cops (Documentary 2025; co-director)

== See also ==
- List of Indian documentary filmmakers
