= Sirkiband =

The Sirkiband are a Hindu caste found in the states of Haryana and Punjab in India. They have scheduled caste status in Haryana. A small number in Punjab are now Sikh.

== Origin ==
The community get their name from the Hindi sikri, meaning straw and band meaning those who tie. They are a community that was traditionally involved in the manufacture of articles made of straw and grass. The Sikriband consist of a number of endogamous groupings, such as the Nat, Madari, Bazigar, Deha, Bhope and Singikat. These groups are further divided into clans called gotras, which are exogamous. Their main gotras include the Athwal, Kilala, Chanal, Kurania, and Sarsar. The Sikriband speak Haryanvi, but most also understand Hindi.

In Punjab, the Sikriband are found mainly in settlements along the Sutlej and Beas rivers. They claim to be of Rathore Rajput origin. The Sikriband claim descent from Jaimal, a Rajput prince, who on being defeated by the Mughals fled to the jungle. His descendants then took up the occupation of manufacturing straw mats. They are now found mainly in the towns of Jagraon, Moga, Fazilka, Barnala, Abohar and Jalandhar, and speak Punjabi.

== Present circumstances ==
The majority of the Sirkiband are still involved with the manufacture of straw items. Like many North Indian artisan castes, they have seen a decline in their economic circumstances. As an almost entirely landless community, most are now employed as landless agricultural labourers. A good many have now emigrated to the urban areas of Haryana, where they are employed as daily wage labourers.

The Sirkibands are Hindu, and their main tribal deities are Gugga Pir and Shitala Mata. Their customs are similar to other Haryana Hindus.

In Punjab, the community are strictly endogamous, and practice clan exogamy. Their clans are known as gotras, the main ones being the Jhanaodia, Lakhewale, Labana, Chauhan, Rane, Ratrana and Rathore. A small number of the Punjab Sirkiband are now Sikh. Most Sirkiband are still involved in their traditional occupation of manufacturing straw mats. A greater number are now daily wage labourers. A few have been given land by the government, but their holdings are extremely small.
