= Basith =

Hindu caste

The Vasisth are a Hindu caste found in Jammu and Kashmir. According to the 2001 Census of India, the caste had 18,866 members.

== History ==
During British Period many were given Rajput titles, traditional Rajputs called them Khas Rajput, Khas is considered derogatory by community, Vasisth Rajput those were Sikh during British Period and after through judiciary (Jammu and Kashmir High Court) removed Vasisth Rajput, still using vasisth tittles.They still considering Vasisth as the misl of Banda Singh Bahadur (military confideracy like Sukarchakiya Misl of Maharaj Ranjit Singh and other misls), not caste. Mostly don't used Gotra or caste titles because of their Sikh Faith. vasisth like Jat, Yadav is very large community, not small one, but under different Rajput titles they became Rajput during British rule in different states.Britisher gave them Rajput titles to fulfill the requirements of soldiers to fuel World Wars by recruiting them in British Indian Army. Now, they all are claiming to be Rajput historically, except only Sikhs of twin district of Rajouri Poonch of Jammu and Kashmir, so we don't want to mention them living under different Rajput titles in various Indian states, it's their choice under the process of sanskritisation.

== Culture ==
The population is small with majority of them being farmers and indulged in agriculture. They worship Ganga, the Gita, and Gow Mata. The sub-castes includes Karamchayal, Pisher, Telchub, Chasyal, Charnal, Sukhwal, Sanghal, Sanwal, Kalyal, Mandyal, Pandhyal, Malyal, Pachyal, Badhan, Chatriyal. They are endogamous and practice clan exogamy and their clans are called zaats and include the Chatriyal, Chimal, Raine, Sangwal; Kangwal; Bangwal; Chasyal; Kalyal etc. each of which have their own origin legend. The panchayat deals with all intra-community disputes, as well as those who breach community norms. Marriages with other communities also takes place excommunicated. They worship the Hindi pantheon as well as their clan gods and goddesses, called kul-devitas.
