= National Commission for Denotified, Nomadic and Semi-Nomadic Tribes =

Development commission under Ministry of Social Justice and Empowerment in India

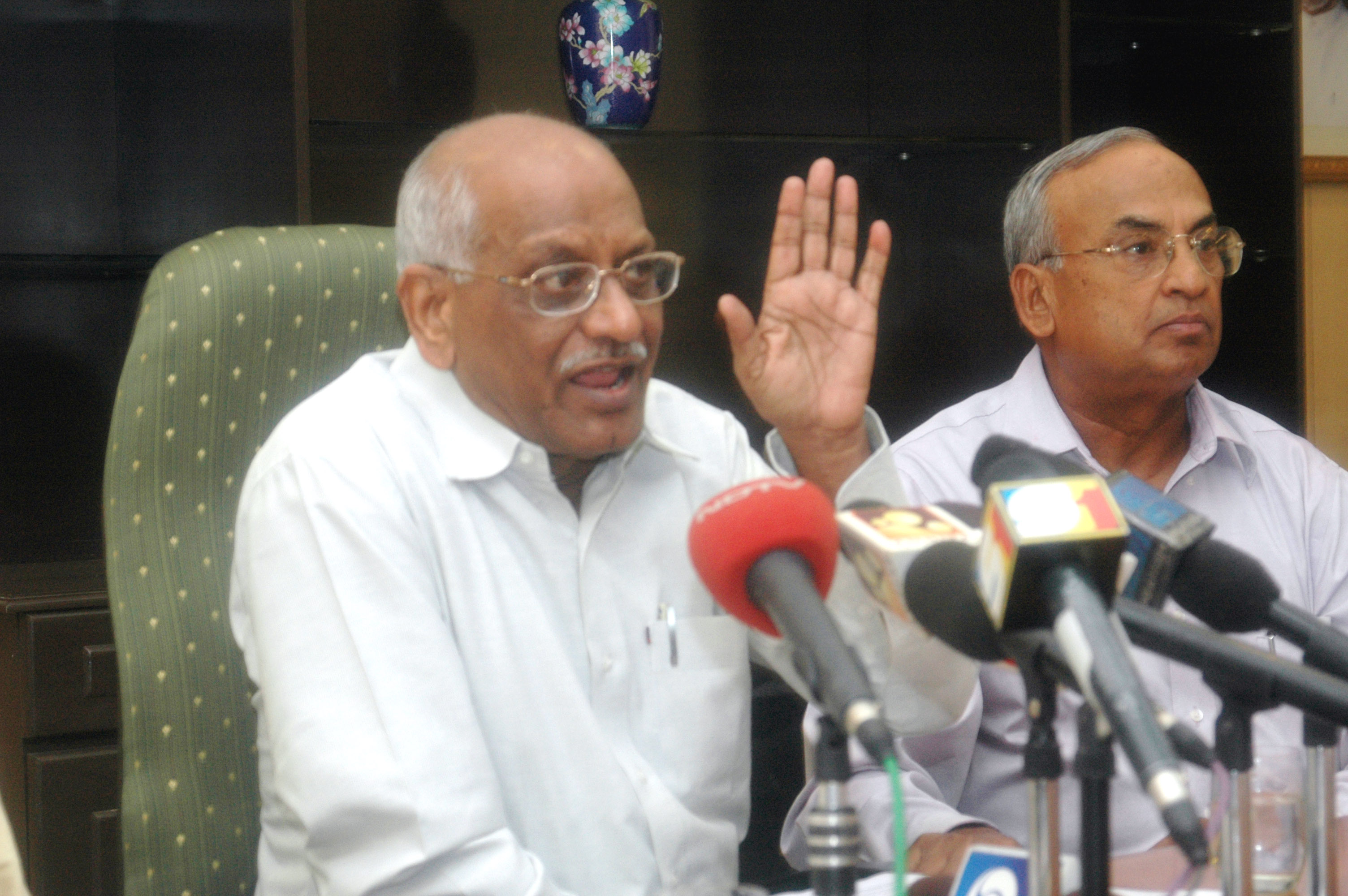
The Chairman of the National Commission for Denotified, Nomadic & Semi-Nomadic Tribes, Balkrishna Sidram Renke briefing the media persons regarding the problems faced these tribes and also regarding the mandated work of the commission, in New Delhi on June 9, 2006.

The National Commission for Denotified, Nomadic and Semi-Nomadic Tribes (NCDNSNT) is a national commission set under the Ministry of Social Justice and Empowerment, Government of India, to study various developmental aspects of denotified and nomadic or semi-nomadic tribes in India.

The commission was first was set up on 22 November 2003 and reconstituted on 16 March 2005 as the earlier commission could not make much headway for a number of reasons. Mr. Balkrishna Sidram Renke, Laxmanbhai Kalidas Patni and Laxmi Chand were appointed as the chairperson, Member and Member Secretary of the commission, respectively. The commission assumed its functioning with effect from 6 February 2006.

== Terms of reference of the commission ==
The commission had following terms of reference:

a. To specify the economic interventions required for raising the living standards of Denotified, Nomadic and Semi Nomadic Tribes by asset creation and self-employment opportunities;

b. To recommend measures to utilize the existing channeling agencies set up for the economic development of SC/STs and OBCs for extending an economic development package to these groups, keeping in view their specific requirements; and

c. To identify programmes required for their education, development and health;

d. To make any other connected or incidental recommendation, that the Commission deems necessary.

== Report ==
The Commission submitted its report on 2 July 2008 making several recommendations, which include that same reservations as available to Scheduled Castes and Scheduled Tribes be extended to around 11 crore people of denotified and nomadic or semi-nomadic tribes in India; it is also recommended that the provisions of the Scheduled Caste and Scheduled Tribe (Prevention of Atrocities) Act, 1989 be applicable to these tribes as well. The report also said that deprivation faced by these communities was partly because these communities are largely politically ‘quiet’ — they do not place their demands concretely before the government for they lack vocal leadership and also lack the patronage of a national leader. They lack awareness about their own rights.
