= Bayar (caste) =

Hindu caste

The Bayar, or sometimes pronounced Biyar, are a Hindu caste found in the states of Uttar Pradesh and Chhattisgarh in India.

== Origin ==
The word bayar is said to mean seed bed in Hindi, and it is suggested that they may have acquired this name on account of their occupation as cultivators of rice and constructors of embankments. . The Bayar are still found mainly in Varanasi District, in and Chakia and Chandauli. A big number are also found in Mirzapur and Sonbhadra District of Uttar Pradesh. They speak Awadhi.

Robert suggests that in the Korba jamindari they have been professional diggers and are a mixed caste of primitive tribes with some Hindu blood.

== Present circumstances ==
The Bayar are strictly endogamous community, and practice the principle of clan exogamy. These clans are referred to as kuris, and their main clans are the Kanaujiya, Sakarwar, Barwar, Mahato, Kahto, Kashi and Barhar. These clans are also hypergamous, with the Kanaujiya intermarrying only with the Barwar, Sakarwar and Mahato. They live in multi-caste villages, but occupy distinct quarters. Each of their settlement contains an informal caste council, known as a biradari panchayat. The panchayat acts as instrument of social control, dealing with issues such as divorce and adultery.

The Bayar are community of cultivators and graziers, often occupying tracts of land outside their villages to graze. They also raise a number of crops such as potatoes. Biyar are very quite and respectable tribe.

They eat fowls and pork but do not take food from any other caste.

== See also ==
- Rajbhar
- Baiswar
