= Hali (caste) =

Dalit community of Himachal Pradesh

The Hali are a marginalized community present in the state of Himachal Pradesh in India. They are particularly present in Chamba district and traditionally worked as agricultural labourers, tanners and musicians. They are recognized as Scheduled Caste in Himachal Pradesh.

== History ==
During the reign of the Chamba State, there was a rigid caste system followed in the state and work was divided on the hereditary profession. The society followed a rigid hierarchy of caste, with upper castes Rajput and Brahmin, and lower castes artisan groups primarily Lohar, Chanals (fishermen) and Halis. They were one of the untouchable communities of the Chamba region, who derive their name from the word 'hal', which refers to 'plough' as their primarily occupation was working as agricultural labourers in the field of upper-caste Thakurs. The community is a sub-group of Gaddis, and their lifestyle is similar to the other Dalit communities of the region, such as the Chamars.

The community is also found among the Scheduled tribes of the region such as Gaddis and Pangwalas, having internalized hierarchy with them being the lowest group of the hierarchy, along with the Sippis.

In the early twentieth century, the community was deeply influenced by the Arya Samaj, which helped in uniting the community across the region and many of the members went through the process of Shuddhi (or Purification) to increase their societal status by leaving their hereditary profession of leather tanning and disposal of dead animals.

== Modern times ==
They were recognized as Scheduled Castes under India's affirmative system and are beneficiary of the reservation policy. Though in many occasion, the community face issue of their recognition between Scheduled Castes and Scheduled Tribes. They are considered as sub-group of Gaddis, who are recognized as Scheduled Tribes in the state and them being recognized as Scheduled Castes leading them to face systemic discrimination and misrecognition. The community trails to the Gaddis in term of land ownership and employment representation, particularly in Bharmour region (which is a Scheduled Area) because many members are not recognized as tribe due to which they are not covered under benefits provided to tribals as per of Tribal Sub-Plan. At the time of independence, many Halis who were converted to Aryas after the Shuddhi process of Arya Samaj and called themselves as Arya Gaddis or Conveted Halis were not recognized as Halis disqualifying them as Scheduled Castes.

As of 2011 census, their population in Himachal Pradesh was 43,218. Out of the total population, around 41,056 of the members resides in the Chamba district.
