= Harni =

Muslim community

- Religions: Islam
- Languages: Punjabi
- Region: Punjab; mainly Ludhiana, Okara, Sahiwal and Gurdaspur

The Harni are a Muslim community found in the province of Punjab, Pakistan. and also found in Punjab, India.
