= Banke Chamar =

Indian freedom fighter in the Rebellion of 1857

- Born: 27 July 1820; Kuarpur village, Jaunpur, Uttar Pradesh, British India
- Died: 18 December 1857 (aged 37)
- Other name: Banka Chamar
- Occupation: Revolutionary
- Organization: Names of the Indian Rebellion of 1857
- Known for: Led initial actions against the British East India Company
- Movement: Indian Rebellion of 1857
- Status: Executed by hanging
- Conviction: Killing
- Penalty: Death

Details
- Victims: British soldiers

Banke Chamar (27 July 1820 – 18 December 1857) was an Indian revolutionary, who took part in the Indian Rebellion of 1857.

His efforts in Jaunpur Janpad underscored the grassroots nature of the resistance movement.

== Early life ==
Banke was born in Kuarpur village, Jaunpur Janpad, Uttar Pradesh, into a Chamar family.

The British leading to his capture and execution by hanging on 18 December 1857.
