= Gandhila =

The Gandhila sometimes pronounced as Gandhil and Gandola, are a Hindu caste found in North India. They have scheduled caste status in Punjab and Haryana.

== Origin ==
According to the traditions of the community, they descend from a Rajput by the name of Sabal Singh. He was killed fighting in the forces of the Sultanate of Delhi, and his family were driven out by his enemies. They were then forced to take menial jobs, such as rearing donkeys. The word Gandhila is said to mean a donkey rearer. The Gandhila are found mainly in Ambala District, and speak Haryanvi. In Uttar Pradesh, the Gandhila are found mainly in Meerut and Muzaffarnagar districts. They speak Hindi with outsiders, but have their own dialect. In Punjab, the Gandhila are found mainly in Jalandhar and Patiala districts. The Punjab Gandhila trace their descent from two brothers, Sambal Singh and Ajit Mal, both of whom were Chauhan Rajputs. On their defeat at the hands of the Mughal Emperor Babar, the two brothers took an oath not to sleep on a bed or eat with silver utensils until the Mughals were defeated. They then fled to the jungle, where the Gandhila were helped by the Bangali, another jungle nomad tribe. The Bangalis suggested that the Chauhans take up raising donkeys. The community thus became known as gadhewalas or donkey keepers, which was eventually corrupted to Gadhila. In the Colonial period, Gandhila were listed under the Criminal Tribes Act, 1871, as being a tribe "addicted to the systematic commission of non-bailable offences."

== Present circumstances ==
The Gandhila are strictly endogamous, and prefer marrying close kin. They are Hindus, but have no particular tribal deity. Their customs are similar to other Hindus.

The traditional occupation of the Gandhila is making brooms from palm leaves. However, a majority of the Gandhila are now day labourers, with many working in the construction industry. A small number have been given land as part of government schemes to settle the community. But these plots are extremely small, and most supplement their income by working as agricultural labourers. In Uttar Pradesh, they were victims of a system known as chautha, which is a form of sharecropping, where they have to hand over a fourth of their produce to the landowner.

Most live in multi-caste villages, often working for Jat or Brahmin patrons. They are an extremely marginalized community, suffering from severe poverty.

In Punjab, the Gandhila speak their own language called Pasto, although most also speak Punjabi.

== See also ==
- Bangali
- Kanjar
