= Deha =

Caste in India

The Deha, sometimes pronounced Dhea, Daiya and Dheya, are a caste in India, who have the Schedule Caste status in Haryana.

== Origin ==
Community myths refer to their descent from two brothers, Chhaju and Raju. Chhaju's daughter took to scavenging, and as such was ostracised. Over time her descendants came to form a distinct community. Other traditions make references to the fact the community emigrated from Sargodha in what is now Pakistan. The Deha speak their own dialect, although most also speak Haryanvi.

== Present circumstances ==
The Deha were traditionally a nomadic community, that have only recently settled down. Many are now found in encampments at the outskirts of towns and villages. They are strictly endogamous community, and consists of a number of exogamous clans. Their main clans are the Kalyana, Kandara, Sarsar, Jhung, Thual, Chanal, and Ghussar.

A majority of the Deha are day labourers, with many working in the construction industry. A small number have been given land as part of government schemes to settle the community. But these plots are extremely small, and most supplement their income by working as agricultural labourers. Most live in multi-caste villages, often working for Jat or Brahmin patrons. They are an extremely marginalized community, suffering from severe poverty.

== See also ==
- Bangali
