= Saryara =

Hindu caste in India

The Saryaras are a Hindu caste found in the Jammu and Kashmir. Earlier they were included in Rajput Community. They all were the descendants of Maharaja Pratap Singh.

According to the 2001 Census of India, their population was 13,327, with almost half of them living in Bahu Fort, an old town situated along the banks of Jammu Tawi river.

== Society ==
The Saryara are strictly endogamous, and like other Jammu Hindus practice clan exogamy. Their main clans include the Sagotra, Dalotra, Pajgotra, Dadwal, Basotra, And, Chalotra, Fangotra, Gotra, Patru, Nagotra, and Sawalia.

The Saryara live in multi-caste villages, occupying their own distinct quarters. Each of their settlements contains a caste council which resolves dishes within the community and enforces community norms. The Saryara also have a statewide caste association based in the Bahu Fort locality.

This caste is mainly known for one person that is late Shri Amar chand chalotra.
