= Nomadic tribes in India =

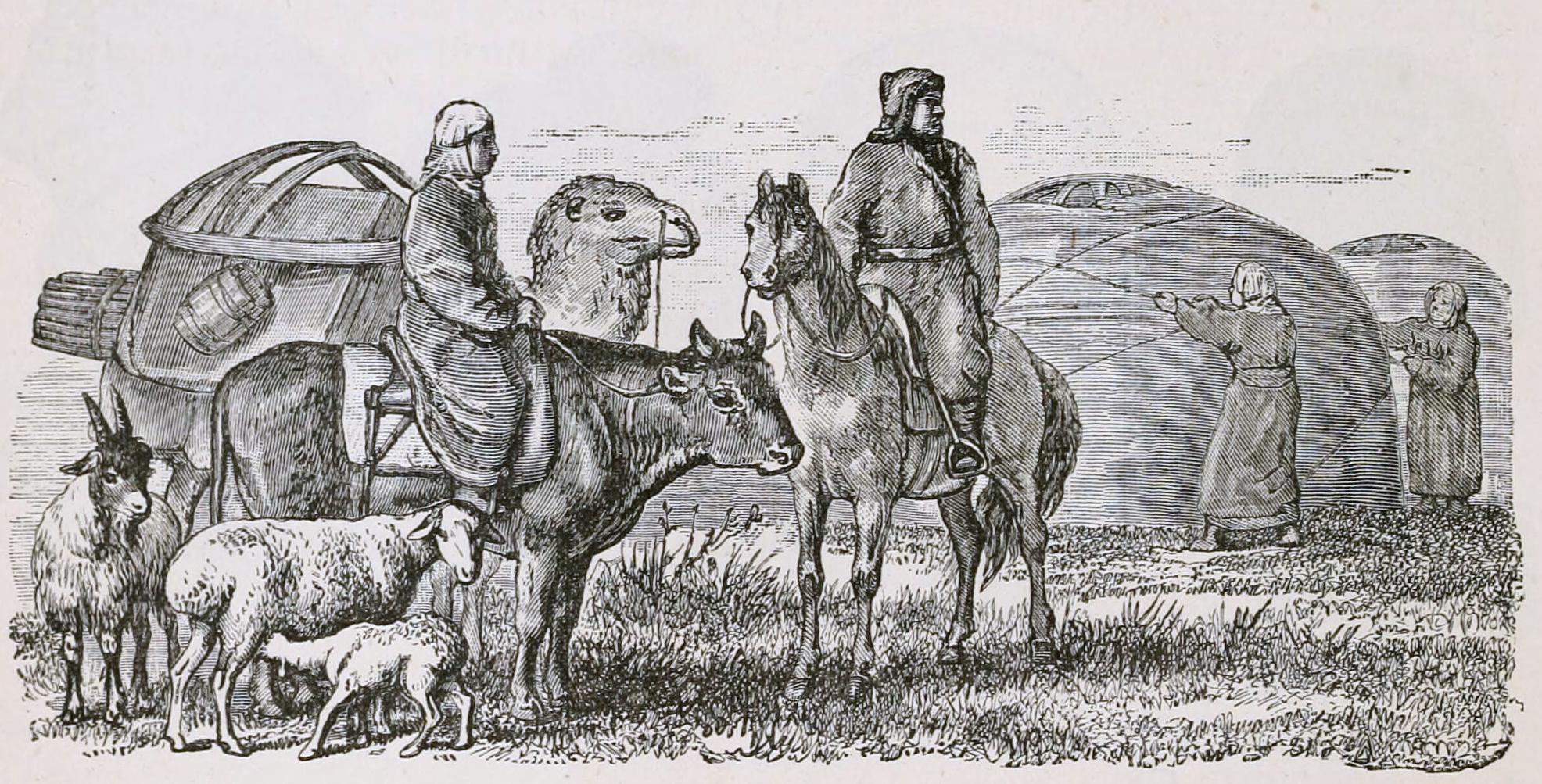
Nomadic Tribes of Asia

The Nomadic Tribes and Denotified Tribes consist of about 60 million people in India, out of which about five million live in the state of Maharashtra. There are 315 Nomadic Tribes and 198 Denotified Tribes.

A large section of the Nomadic pastoralist tribes are known as vimukta jatis or 'free / liberated jatis' because they were classed as such under the Criminal Tribes Act 1871, enacted under British rule in India.

After Indian independence, this act was repealed by the Government of India in 1952. In Maharashtra, these people are not included in the list of Scheduled Tribes due to historical circumstances, but are listed as Scheduled Castes or "Nomadic Tribes". The tribes designated as "Denotified", "Nomadic" or "Semi-Nomadic" are eligible for reservation in India.

The Government of India established the National Commission for De-notified, Nomadic and Semi Nomadic tribes in 2005 to study the developmental aspects of such tribes.

== See also ==
- Denotified tribes of India
- Nomads of India
- Nomadic peoples of Europe
- Rajasthani people
