= Kabirpanthi Julaha =

Sikh caste found in North India

Regions with significant populations
- India

Languages
- Hindi, Punjabi, Himachali

Religion
- Sikhism, Hinduism

Related ethnic groups
- Julaha

The Kabirpanthi Julaha or Julaha or Jullaha is a Hindu and Sikh caste found in North India. Traditionally it was a community of weavers engaged in the production of handmade clothes and they are followers of Kabir.

They are classified as an Other Backward Caste or Scheduled Caste in Haryana, Punjab, Himachal Pradesh and Uttar Pradesh.
