= Kunzer =

Place in Jammu and Kashmir

Kunzer Kunzar
- Nickname: Rizuidu
- Location in Jammu and Kashmir, India Kunzer (India)
- Coordinates: 34.09°N 74.50°E
- Country: India
- Union Territory: Jammu and Kashmir
- District: Baramulla
- Established: 4500 BC

Government
  - Body: Municipal Committee Kunzer, MCK
- Elevation: 1,761 m (5,778 ft)

Population (2001)
  - Total: 1,901

Languages
  - Official: Kashmiri, Urdu, Hindi, Dogri, English
- Time zone: UTC+5:30 (IST)
- Postal code: 193404
- Vehicle registration: JK05
- Website: baramulla.nic.in

Kunzar, or Kunzer, is a town in the union territory of Jammu and Kashmir located in the District Baramulla. It is 30 km from Srinagar and approximately 32 km from Baramulla town.

== Geography ==
Kunzer is located at 34.09°N 74.50°E. It has an average elevation of 1,761 metres (5,778 feet). Kunzer is situated on the left bank/side of river Ferozpora Nallah which is the big river of this area. Kunzer is also famous for clean water as there are few springs in kunzer town and people of the surrounding areas come here and collect water for drinking purposes as the water comes from these springs is very sweet and the people call these springs as Kokar nag.

== Demographics ==
As of 2001 India census, Kunzer had a population of 1901. Males constitute 47% of the population and females 53%. Kunzer has an average literacy rate of 46%, lower than the national average of 59.5%: male literacy is 62%, and female literacy is 30%. In Kunzer, 13% of the population is under 6 years of age.Kunzer has a Primary Health Center PHC for all the patients of the area.It has one Govt. Higher Secondary school, Govt High school, Mohammadia High School, Hamdania Public school, Allama Iqbal high school and various government middle and primary schools. A Jammu and Kashmir Bank ATM and an HDFC ATM are functional in the market. India Post Sub Office commonly known as Post Office is located at the central heart of town. Tehsil Office is located opposite the Army Camp. For recreational purposes, two public parks have been developed, which are located near the Kunzer bridge. Kunzer is also a gateway to famous tourist hill station Gulmarg and Baba Reshi. Kunzer houses one open state play field, two public parks, one police law enforcement station, Niabat Office in the central area.
