= Denotified Tribes =

Political designation of tribes in India

Denotified Tribes are the tribes in India that were listed originally under the Criminal Tribes Act of 1871, as Criminal Tribes and "addicted to the systematic commission of non-bailable offences." Once a tribe became "notified" as criminal, all its members were required to register with the local magistrate, failing which they would be charged with a crime under the Indian Penal Code.

The Criminal Tribes Act was repealed in 1949 and thus 'de-notified' the tribal communities. This Act, however, was replaced by a series of Habitual Offenders Acts, that asked police to investigate a suspect's "criminal tendencies" and whether their occupation is "conducive to settled way of life." The denotified tribes were reclassified as "habitual offenders" in 1959.

The name "Criminal Tribes" is itself a misnomer as no definition of tribe denotes occupation, but they were identified as tribes "performing" their primary occupation. The first census was in 1871 and at that time there was no consensus nor any definition of what constitutes a "tribe". The terms "tribe" and "caste" were used interchangeably for these tribes.

== Call for repeal ==
The UN's anti-discrimination body Committee on the Elimination of Racial Discrimination (CERD) asked India to repeal the Habitual Offenders Act (1952) and effectively rehabilitate the denotified and nomadic tribes on 9 March 2007.

== Reservations ==
In 2008, the National Commission for Denotified, Nomadic and Semi-Nomadic Tribes (NCDNSNT) of Ministry of Social Justice and Empowerment recommended equal reservations, as available to Scheduled Castes and Scheduled Tribes, for around 110 million people belonging to the denotified tribes, nomadic or semi-nomadic tribes in India. Along with the tribes designated as, "Nomadic" or "Semi-Nomadic", the denotified tribes are eligible for reservation.

== List of Denotified tribes ==
Here are a list of some notable tribes and castes which were listed under Criminal Tribes Act during the British Raj.

- Koli
- Ramoshi
- Bazigar
- Bawaria
- Bauria
- Banjara
- Nat
- Harni
- Bhampta

== See also ==
- National Commission for Denotified, Nomadic and Semi-Nomadic Tribes
- Nomadic tribes in India
- Hijra (South Asia)
