= Tangmarg =

Town in Kashmir, India

- Town
- Tangmarg Post Office

- Location in Jammu and Kashmir, India Tangmarg (India)
- Coordinates: 34°03′33″N 74°25′28″E
- Country: India
- Union territory: Jammu and Kashmir
- District: Baramulla

Languages
  - Official: Kashmiri, Urdu, Hindi, Dogri, English
  - Spoken: Pahadi, Gujari
- Time zone: UTC+5:30 (IST)
- PIN: 193402
- Telephone code: +911954

Tangmarg is a town and tehsil in Baramulla district in Indian union territory of Jammu and Kashmir. In 2014, Tangmarg was granted a sub division and trifurcated into three Tehsils (Tangmarg, Kunzer and Karhama), with Sub Divisional Magistrate SDM Office located at Tangmarg. The Tangmarg town is central to more than 100 villages in the vicinity. Tangmarg is gateway of gulmarg which is just 13 km away, also Drung waterfall is 3 km away which makes Tangmarg most crowded place in the evening due to clean & fresh environment.

Tangmarg has a post office that has been recently modernized, computerized and renovated and there are plans to develop it into a model post office at par with project arrow post offices. There are many hotels and restaurants, everything required by travelling tourists. Tangmarg is 39 km (24 mi) from Srinagar by a two-lane road. Tangmarg has many tourist spots like Drung, Gulmarg, Baderkoot, Zandpal, Gogaldara, Nigli Nullah and Baba Reshi. The name "Baba Reshi" is locally given for the great Sufi saint of Kashmir Baba Payam ud Din Reshi who has a Shrine located around 6 km (3.7 mi) from Tangmarg. Tangmarg is also known as gate of Gulmarg. Tangmarg is also known as shen kaul which means brook of snow. Tangmarg is also famous for trout fish.

== Geography ==
The Longitude is 75.36679 and the Latitude is 33.80405. Amongst the prominent villages of this tehsil are Hardushoora, Ferozpora, Pariswani, Chaindil Waingam, Kulhama, Hajibal, Bungam, Reram, Druroo, Hardu Ichloo, Khaipora, Solinda Kunzer, Devbugh, Kralweth Lalpora, Gonipora, Devpora Dardpora, Gogaldara, Mohyen, Shrai, Ganibaba, Pandithpora Bala, Baderkoot, Ratnipora, Ogmuna, Hardu-Aboora, Hariwatnoo, Treran Check, Katibugh, Chandilora, Qazipora, Gund Dalwash, Tarahama. Tangmarg is famous for fresh cold water, heavy snowfall, and Tourism. Tangmarg is a hilly area with most parts covered by lush green forests.

== Access and transport ==
Tangmarg is located about 38 km (24 mi) from Srinagar; the journey time by road is about 40 minutes. Sheikh ul-Alam International Airport, Srinagar is 49 km (30 mi) away. Gulmarg is 13 km (8.1 mi) away on the Narbal-Tangmarg Road. The general approach to the town is through road transport (taxi and bus). Transport is available from Srinagar, Baramulla, Magam, Sopore, Gulmarg and Pattan. The town is also not far from the Mazhama Railway station.

A road from Tangmarg to Gogaldara is under construction. This road would connect Tehsil Tangmarg with Tehsil Khag of Badgam district. Another road from Drung to Poonch district of Pir Panjal region is under consideration by the government.

== History ==
The history of Tangmarg dates back to Mughal Era. It was used as a gateway to Gulmarg. Literally from local dialect Tang means Pear and Marg means meadow. There are many pear, cherry and apple trees in the vicinity of Tangmarg town scattered in different villages.

== Education and health ==
A Sub-district Hospital is located at Tangmarg with affiliated Primary Health Centres in all major villages. A Government Degree College was established in 2011-12 at Chandilora. 5 Higher Secondary Schools are situated in Tangmarg including Tyndale Biscoe and Mallinson School and Fazil Kashmiri memorial higher secondary School.

== Language ==
Kashmiri is the predominant language spoken in the villages of Tangmarg. Urdu is second widely spoken language after Kashmiri. Pahari is another important language spoken in area whereas English language is also spoken by educated class and those who deal with the tourism industry. Gojri also has many speakers.
