= Banjara (disambiguation) =

Banjara or Banjaara is a community traditionally identified as nomadic inhabitants from the northwestern region of the Indian subcontinent.

Banjara may also refer to:

== Places ==
- Banjara Hills, neighbourhood in Hyderabad, Telangana
- Banjara Nagar, a village in Telangana
- Banjara Lake, lake in Telangana
- Banjara Virasat Museum, museum in Wardha district, Maharashtra
- Banjaratma Heritage Rest Area, Rest Area in Brebes Regency, Indonesia

== Entertainment ==
- Banjara (2018 film), Indian Punjabi-language film
- Banjara (2025 film), Indian Marathi-language film
- Dil Banjaara, a Pakistani serial

== Music ==
- "Banjara", a song in the film Ek Tha Tiger (2012)
- "Banjara", a song in Ek Villain (2014)

== Other uses ==
- Banjara literature

== See also ==
- Banjar
- Banjari
