= Banjara Nagar =

- Village / Thanda
- Location in Telangana, India Banjara Nagar (India)
- Coordinates: 16.851024°N 78.689707°E
- Country: India
- State: Telangana
- District: Rangareddy

Significant Features
  - Languages: Lambadi, Telugu
- Time zone: UTC+5:30 (IST)
- PIN: 509327
- Telephone code: 08545
- Nearest city: Hyderabad
- Lok Sabha constituency: Ibrahimpatnam
- Vidhan Sabha constituency: kalwakurty
- Website: www.banjaranagar.tk

Banjara Nagar (also known as Banjara Nagar Thanda) is a village/Thanda in Rangareddy district of Telangana, India. It falls under Madgul Mandal. It is 3 km from Madgul Mandal. Jairam Thanda & Dubba thanda are the neighbouring thandas.

== History ==
Banjara Nagar is the alliance of four thandas namely 1. Balu Thanda 2. Valya thanda 3. Pakira thanda 4. Hunya thanda. Jaaths in thanda are mostly Ramavath, Kodavath, Jatooth and Jarupla.

== Economy and education ==
The traditional commerce are agriculture and trade. Lambanis are also nomadic cattle herders. and how a day people have been employed mostly in Studying and farming.

It comprises two Primary Schools and most of the youths in thanda are literate, but drive taxies, auto rikshaw, employed as chiefs and waiters in hotels and a few are pursuing Graduates and Post-Graduates Courses in Education and very few are employed.
