= Lambada =

Lambada may refer to:

- Lambada (dance), a Brazil-origin dance
- "Lambada" (song), a 1989 song recorded by the pop group Kaoma
- Lambada (film), a 1990 American film
- Distar UFM-13 Lambada, a motorglider produced in the Czech Republic

== See also ==
- Banjara or Lambadi, a people of India
  - Lambada embroidery
  - Lambadi, their Indo-Aryan language
- Lambda (disambiguation)
