= Banjara Virasat Museum =

Museum in Washim district, Maharashtra, India

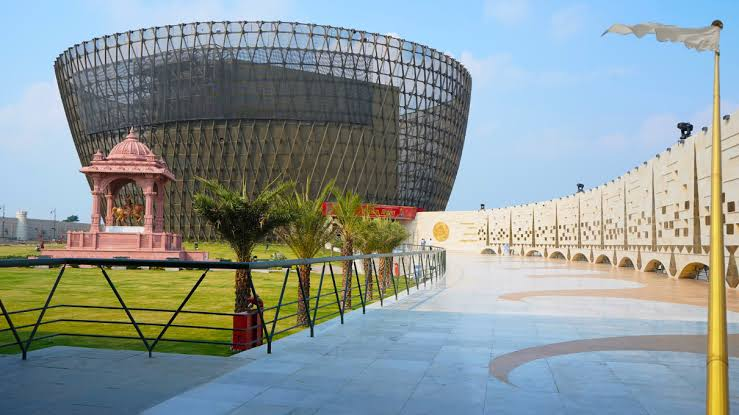

- Banjara Virasat Museum, Poharadevi, Manora, Washim district, Maharashtra
- Established: October 5, 2024
- Location: Manora, Poharadevi Washim district, Maharashtra
- Coordinates: 20.1187°N 77.6277°E
- Type: Museum

Banjara Virasat Museum is a museum dedicated to the historical Banjara community ( originally from Rajputana Rajasthan who are settled in various states of India), situated at Poharadevi in Washim district of Maharashtra state in India.The Banjara community is blessed with a historical and glorious legacy of an independent culture. The Gour community is known as a warrior, valorous, and self-respecting society. The 'Nagara' is a historic musical instrument used in Rajputana during wars, crises, victories, and worship. The 'Nagara' is considered a symbol of the bravery, self-respect, culture, history and patriotism of the Gour Banjara community. Therefore, this historical Banjara Virasat Museum is a replica of the 'Nagara'.

== Location ==
This museum is located with the coordinates of (20.1187°N 77.6277°E) at Poharadevi.

Banjara Virasat Museum (Maharashtra)

== Inauguration ==
The museum was inaugurated by the prime minister of India, on 5 October 2024, at the premises of the museum at Poharadevi, in Washim district of Maharashtra.

== Aims ==
The museum showcases the cultural practices, traditions and history of the Banjara community. It is an important cultural hub. Its aim is to preserve and promote heritage of Banjara. It boosts tourism in that region. Also, its aim is to establish Poharadevi neighbourhood as a cultural and religious destination.The Nagara Museum preserves historical Gor Banjara heritage—spanning its glorious culture, Banjara literature, valiant warriors, global 'Ladeni' trade, and revered saints, to modern visionaries like Vasantrao Naik, pioneer of the Agricultural Revolution of India, and Sudhakarrao Naik, father of the Water Revolution.

== Foundation and features ==
The foundation stone of the museum was laid in the year 2018. The museum is featured with a 150-feet Sevadhwaj with an equestrian statue of Sant Sevalal Maharaj. A daily light and music laser show takes place at about 7 p.m.

The museum designed by Design Habit Delhi is a four-story structure with thirteen galleries of historical exhibits. It highlights the rich heritage of Banjara community. It showcases the legacy of the Banjara community and its leaders, historical movements and the artefacts that depict their ways of lives.

== See Also ==
Vasantrao Naik

Sudhakarrao Naik

Lakha Banjara Lake

Banjara Literature

Govind Guru Banjara

Jannayak Lakhi Rai Banjara

Mangarh Battle in British India
