= Anepuram =

Coordinates: 17°25′N 79°50′E

- Village/Thanda
- Interactive map of Anepuram
- Country: India
- State: Telangana
- District: Warangal
- Talukas: Maripeda

Languages
  - Official: Telugu
- Time zone: UTC+5:30 (IST)
- PIN: 506315
- Telephone code: 08719
- Vehicle registration: TS
- Website: telangana.gov.in

Anepuram is a village in the Maripeda mandal in Mahabubabad district.

== Geography ==
There are many hills in the village, commonly called Nagendra Swami Gutla, Puli Gutla, and Vaandri Gatla by the tribals of that place. The village contains many ponds, which are called Anepuram Cheruvu, Garddam Cheruvu, Dhamara Cheruvu etc.

The village is located on the left side of the national highway NH-563 from Khammam to Karimnagar.

== Population ==
Anepuram village contains six thandas, namely Anepuram Stage Thanda, Venkat Nayak Thanda, Jatoth Thanda, Yalimanchala Thanda, Eetikalapadu Thanda, and Jyogya Thanda.

Most of the residents are Lambadis; group of people that ruled the region for many tears in ancient times.

The village people followed the Forefather's traditions, including festivals such as Bangari Maisamma Kolpu, Nagendra Swami Jathara, Teej, and Seetla; all Telugu Festivals are also celebrated.

In Anepuram, every thanda contains one primary school and one anganvadi school in addition to an upper primary school. The stage contains BVM School, which was the Best School in Maripeda Mandal before 2007. After that, school demand has been decreased.

The students from this village study in IITs, NITs, IIITs, IIMs, AIIMS, NLUs and many national and state Best Universities. Some are in engineering, research, medical, agriculture, and law.

Most of the tribal people speak their mother tongue, which is commonly called Banjara. The rest speak Telugu. Educated residents know Hindi and English. Most of the people can read, write, and speak English.

== Economy ==
Most residents are engaged in agriculture. They cultivate crops such as chilly, paddy, cotton, vegetables and grams. Some residents are government employees. Venkat Nayak Thanda has more government employees than other thanda.

The village is a hub of education and sports. Many people participate in all-India, national, and international level meets in kabbadi, cricket kho-kho, ball badminton, badminton, chess, and athletics. Most of people are interested in athletics (100M, 200M, 400, and 800M, javelin, discus, shotput and jumps) and cricket.

During Vacation Holidays, the Village Committee conducts games and sports activities for all age groups.

In summer, the Youth Committee provides cool water for strangers. It also conducts programs such as motivational speeches and sports and games. Venkat Nayak Thanda Youth conduct meetings in January, discussing various topics. all people as
