= History of Portuguese =

Evolution of the Portuguese language

The Portuguese language developed in the Western Iberian Peninsula from Latin spoken by Roman soldiers and colonists starting in the 3rd century BC. Old Galician, also known as Medieval Portuguese, began to diverge from other Romance languages after the fall of the Western Roman Empire and the Germanic invasions, also known as barbarian invasions, in the 5th century, and started appearing in written documents around the 9th century. By the 13th century, Old Portuguese had its own literature and began to split into two languages. However, the debate of whether Galician and Portuguese are nowadays varieties of the same language, much like American English or British English, is still present. In all aspects—phonology, morphology, lexicon and syntax—Portuguese is essentially the result of an organic evolution of Vulgar Latin with some influences from other languages, namely the native Gallaecian and Lusitanian languages spoken prior to the Roman domination.

== Social history ==
=== Romanization ===
Arriving on the Iberian Peninsula in 218 BC, the ancient Romans brought with them Latin, from which all Romance languages descend. The language was spread by arriving Roman soldiers, settlers and merchants, who built Roman cities mostly near the settlements of previous civilizations. Later, the inhabitants of the cities of Lusitania and the rest of Romanized Iberia were recognized as citizens of Rome.

Roman control of the western part of Hispania was not consolidated until the campaigns of Augustus in 26 BC. Although the western territories to the south of the Tagus River were conquered only after the victory of Licinius Crassus in the year 93 BC, only an estimated four hundred words of the native languages persist in modern Portuguese. After 200 years of wars, first with the Carthaginians in the Eastern part of the peninsula, and then with the local inhabitants, Emperor Augustus conquered the whole peninsula, which was named Hispania. He then divided it into three provinces: Hispania Tarraconensis, Hispania Baetica, and Lusitania, the latter of which included most of modern Portugal. At the end of the 3rd century, Emperor Diocletian split Tarraconensis into three parts, creating the adjacent province of Gallaecia, which geographically enclosed the remaining part of Portugal, and modern-day Galicia in the northwestern region of Spain.

=== Iberian Romance ===
Between AD 409 and 711, as the Roman Empire was collapsing, the Iberian Peninsula was invaded by Germanic tribes, mainly Suevi and Visigoths, who largely absorbed the Roman culture and language of the peninsula; however, since the Roman schools and administration were closed, the Vulgar Latin language of ordinary people was left free to evolve on its own and the uniformity of the language across the Iberian Peninsula broke down. In the north-western part of the peninsula (today's Northern Portugal and Galicia), Vulgar Latin began to develop local characteristics, becoming what linguists today call Galician-Portuguese. The Germanic languages influenced Galician-Portuguese by introducing words often linked to the military like guerra (war) or laverca (lark), placenames such as Resende, animals like ganso (goose), texugo (badger), human feelings such as orgulho (pride), verbs like brigar (to fight), suffixes like reguengo (royal domain) and everyday objects such as frasco (flask).

From 711, with the Moorish invasion of the Iberian Peninsula in the Umayyad conquest of the Visigothic Kingdom in Hispania, Arabic was adopted as the administrative language in the conquered regions. However, much of the population continued to speak the Latin-derived Romance dialects, now referred to collectively as Andalusi Romance by modern linguists, or as Mozarabic popularly. The Almohad conquest of al-Andalus led to the emigration of Andalusi Christians (Mozarabs) from southern Iberia, speakers of Andalusi Arabic and Romance, to the Christian north, especially to the Tagus valley. The main lasting effect of Arabic influence on Romance speech is lexical. Modern Portuguese has anywhere from 400 up to 800 words of Arabic origin, especially relating to food, agriculture and the crafts, which have no cognates in other Romance languages except in Spanish from which, in fact, Portuguese borrowed many of its Arabic-derived words. The Arabic influence is also visible in place names, especially in the southern provinces, such as the Algarve, Alfama and Fátima.

Excerpt of medieval
Portuguese poetry
Das que vejo
non desejo
outra senhor se vós non,
e desejo
tan sobejo,
mataria um leon,
senhor do meu coraçon:
fin roseta,
bela sobre toda fror,
fin roseta,
non me meta
en tal coita voss'amor!
João de Lobeira
(1270?–1330?)

The oldest surviving records containing written Galician-Portuguese are documents from the 9th century. In these official documents, bits of Galician-Portuguese found their way into texts that were written in Latin. Today, this phase is known as "Proto-Portuguese" simply because the earliest of these documents are from the former County of Portugal, although Portuguese and Galician were still a single language. This period lasted until the 12th century.

=== The lyric period ===
What modern scholars call Galician-Portuguese was originally the native language of the medieval Kingdom of Galicia, which was founded in 910 and included the northern part of present-day Portugal. It appears to have also been used regularly in other Christian kingdoms of the Iberian Peninsula as the language for lyric song. It was employed by poets from throughout the non-Basque medieval Christian kingdoms of the peninsula; including Leon, Castile, Aragon and Catalonia. It is also the language used in the Cantigas de Santa Maria. These songs were traditionally attributed to Alfonso X, a Castilian king, though more recent work shows that they must have been composed in collaboration with many translators, poets and musicians.

=== The divergence of Galician-Portuguese ===
Portugal was formally recognized as an independent kingdom in 1143 by the Kingdom of León, into which Galicia was incorporated at the time, with Afonso Henriques as its first king. In 1290, King Diniz created the first Portuguese university, in Coimbra (the Estudo Geral) and decreed that the language of the Portuguese, then simply called the "Vulgar language" (i.e. Vulgar Latin) should be used in preference to Latin and known as the "Portuguese language". In 1296, Portuguese was adopted by the royal chancellary and was used not only in poetry but also when writing law and in notaries. In the first period of "Old Portuguese" (from the 12th to 14th century), the language came gradually to be used in official documents. With the political separation of the County of Portugal from Galicia, Galician-Portuguese lost its unity and slowly became two increasingly distinct languages. This growing difference accelerated when the kingdom of León was united with Castile (13th century) and Galician was increasingly influenced by Castilian. Meanwhile, the southern variant of Galician-Portuguese became the modern Portuguese language within the Kingdom of Portugal and its empire.

=== Portuguese outside of Portugal ===
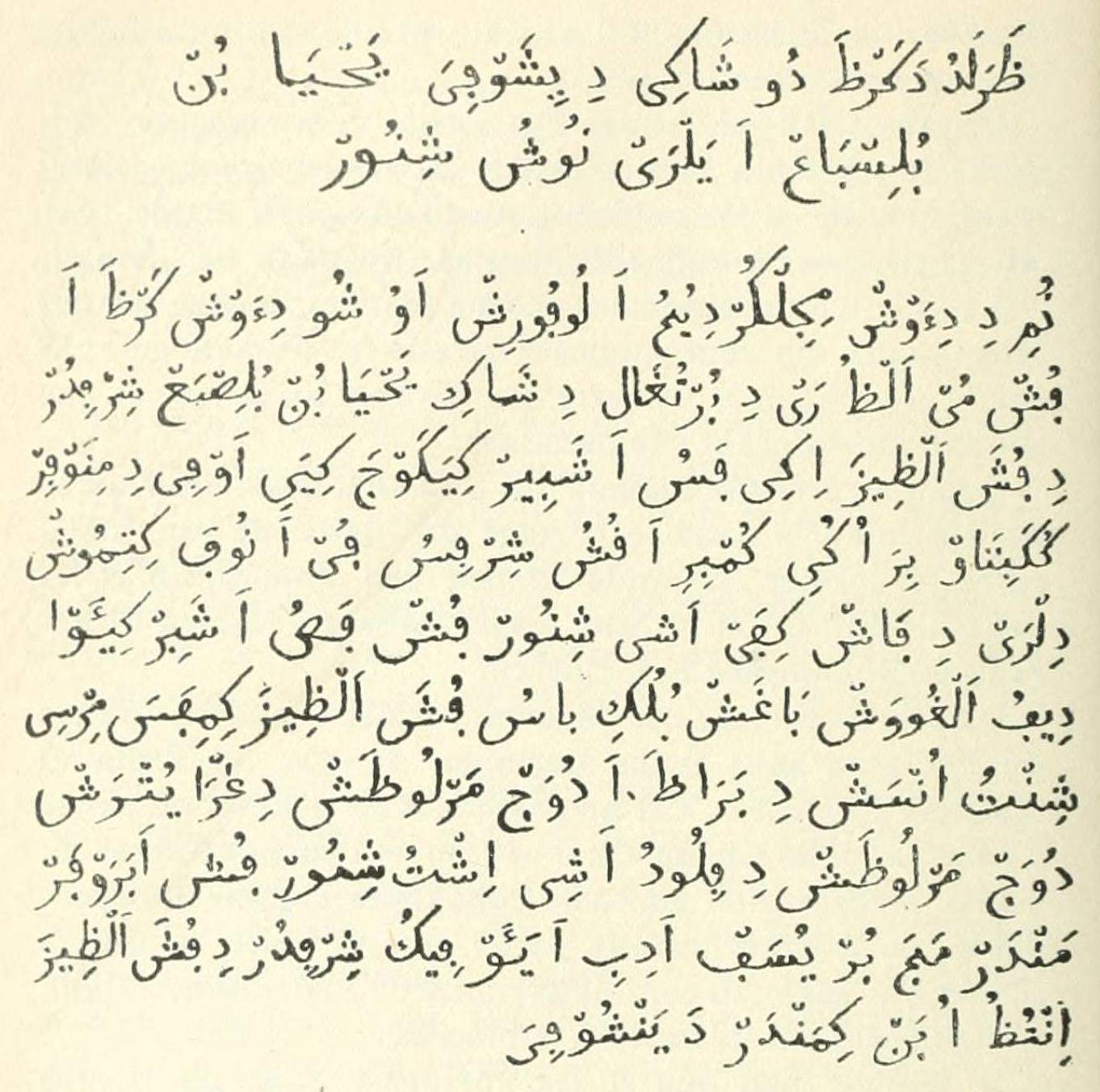
A record of a letter in Portuguese aljamía—early Portuguese written in Arabic script—sent from Sheikh Yahya ben Bulisbé of the Shawiya to the King of Portugal found in the archives of Torre do Tombo.

Portuguese is the second most spoken Romance language, behind Spanish, partially because of the large population of speakers in Brazil, where it is the national language. There are many respects in which Brazilian Portuguese differs from European Portuguese in sound and structure.

Another notable difference is the presence of more audible vowels in Brazilian Portuguese. Beyond this, the nuances of spoken versions of both language practices continue to evolve as generations of speakers age and the world continues to globalize, leading to changes in language practices internationally. Portuguese has been made an official language of Mozambique, Angola, the Cape Verde Islands, Guinea-Bissau, Equatorial Guinea, São Tomé and Príncipe, East Timor and Macao.

== Standardization during the Renaissance ==
The end of "Old Portuguese" was marked by the publication of the Cancioneiro Geral by Garcia de Resende, in 1516.

"Modern Portuguese" developed from the early 16th century to the present. During the Renaissance, scholars and writers borrowed many words from Classical Latin (learned words borrowed from Latin also came from Renaissance Latin) and ancient Greek, which increased the complexity of the Portuguese lexicon. Most literate Portuguese speakers were also literate in Latin and so they easily adopted Latin words into their writing (and eventually speech) in Portuguese. As with most other European vernacular languages, the standardization of the Portuguese language was propelled by the development of the printing press. In 1536, Fernão de Oliveira published his Grammatica da lingoagem portuguesa in Lisbon, the first Portuguese grammar. The work of this heterodox Dominican priest, philologist and mariner was soon followed. In 1540, João de Barros crown officer published his Gramática da Língua Portuguesa along with moral dialogues and basics of the Catholic Church to help teaching young aristocrats. This second work, illustrated with woodcuts, is considered the world's first printed illustrated textbook.

=== Expansion during the age of discovery ===
The second period of Old Portuguese covers the time from the 14th to the 16th centuries and is marked by the Portuguese discoveries of the 15th and 16th centuries. Colonisers, traders and missionaries spread the Portuguese language to many regions in Africa, Asia and The Americas. Today most Portuguese speakers live in Brazil, the biggest former colony of Portugal. By the mid-16th century, Portuguese had become a lingua franca in Asia and Africa, used for not only colonial administration and trade but also communication between local officials and Europeans of all nationalities. In Ceylon (modern Sri Lanka), several kings became fluent speakers of Portuguese, and nobles often took Portuguese names. The spread of the language was helped by its association with the Catholic missionary efforts, which led to its being called Cristão ("Christian") in many places. The Nippo Jisho, a Japanese–Portuguese dictionary written in 1603, was a product of Jesuit missionary activity in Japan. The language continued to be popular in parts of Asia until the 19th century, despite the severe measures taken by the Dutch to abolish it in Ceylon and Indonesia.

Some Portuguese-speaking Christian communities in India, Sri Lanka, Malaysia and Indonesia preserved their language even after they were isolated from Portugal. The language has largely changed in these communities and has evolved through the centuries into several Portuguese creoles. Also, a considerable number of words of Portuguese origin are found in Tetum, the national language of East Timor, such as lee "to read" (from ler), aprende "to learn" (from aprender) and tenke "to have to" (from tem que). Portuguese words entered the lexicons of many other languages, such as pan "bread" (from pão) in Japanese (see Japanese words of Portuguese origin), sepatu "shoe" (from sapato) in Indonesian, keju "cheese" (from queijo) in Malay and meza "table" (from mesa) in Swahili. Due to the vast expanse of the Portuguese Empire, there are also numerous words that entered English (see: List of English words of Portuguese origin) such as albino, baroque, mosquito, potato, savvy and zebra.

== Historical sound changes ==
In both morphology and syntax, Portuguese represents an organic transformation of Latin without the direct intervention of any foreign language. The sounds, grammatical forms, and syntactical types, with a few exceptions, are derived from Latin, and almost 80% of its vocabulary is still derived from the language of Rome. Some of the changes began during the Empire, others took place later. A few words remained virtually unchanged, like carro, taberna ("tavern"), or even returned to a form close to the original, such as coxa ("thigh") – in this case, however, only the spelling looks identical: Latin ⟨x⟩ and Portuguese ⟨x⟩ designate two completely different sounds, [ks] and [ʃ] respectively. Learned Latinisms were formed in the late Middle Ages, due to the use of Church Latin by the Catholic Church, and during the Renaissance, when Classical antiquity in general, and Literary Latin in particular, enjoyed great prestige. Thus, for example, Latin aurum, which had originated ouro ("gold") and dourado ("golden"), was re-introduced as the adjective áureo ("golden"). In the same way, locālem ("place"), which had evolved to lugar, was later reintroduced as the more erudite local. Many erudite Greek and Latin words and combining elements were also introduced or reintroduced in this way. Because of this, many of these words are still familiar to Portuguese speakers.

=== Medieval Galician-Portuguese phonology ===
Galician-Portuguese (from 11th to 16th centuries) had seven oral vowels /a, e, ɛ, i, o, ɔ, u/ (like in most Romance languages) and five nasal vowels /ã, ẽ, ĩ, õ, ũ/. The vowels /e – ɛ, o – ɔ/ were raised to /e, o/ in unstressed syllables, even in final syllables (like in modern Spanish); e.g. vento /vẽto/, quente [ˈkẽte]. However, the /a – ɐ/ distribution (including /ɐ̃/) is still dubious and under discussion; some either stating that these two vowels were allophones and in complementary distribution (like in Spanish and Modern Galician, only treated as /a/), Alemanha, manhã /ale'maɲa, ma'ɲã/; or stating they were not allophones and under distribution like in European Portuguese nowadays, Alemanha, manhã /ɐle'mɐɲɐ, mɐ'ɲɐ̃/.

=== Modern Portuguese phonology ===
Around the 16th century, according to Fernão de Oliveira's Grammatica da lingoagem portuguesa, in Chapter VIII, /a/ and /ɐ/ would already be considered as different phonemes. As a result, the vowel phonology would consist about an 8-oral-vowel system /ɐ, a, e, ɛ, i, o, ɔ, u/ and a 5-nasal-vowel system /ɐ̃, ẽ, ĩ, õ, ũ/; possibly resulting that /ɐ – a, e – ɛ, o – ɔ/ would be raised to /ɐ, e, o/ in unstressed syllables (even in final syllables). Prosodic change in the Classical to Modern pronunciations of Portuguese has been studied through a statistical analysis in evolution of written texts in the 16th and 17th centuries.

=== Contemporary Portuguese phonology ===
From the 16th century to now, Brazilian and European varieties started evolving separately, resulting in meaningful differences regarding vowel phonology. Brazilian Portuguese conserves the 8-oral-vowel system, but European and African varieties innovated by creating a 9th new vowel: /ɨ/, generally used when "e" is unstressed.

- European Portuguese (EP): it has taken a step further: /ɐ – a, e – ɛ, o – ɔ/ are raised to /ɐ, ɨ, u/ in unstressed syllables, except by some words with double-consonant sequences where the first consonant was mute or not (the mute consonants do not exist anymore, since the last spelling reform), opening the vowels to /a, ɛ, ɔ/. E.g. abstenção /abʃtẽˈsɐ̃w̃/, objeto [objecto] /ɔbˈʒɛtu/, direção [direcção] /diɾɛˈsɐ̃w̃/, internet /ĩtɛɾˈnɛt/. However, notice setembro is pronounced /sɨˈtẽbɾu/, although it could formerly be spelled septembro. These exceptions apply to unchanged words before the 20th century spelling reforms, because such "mute" consonants (etymological, but whose sounds were lost over history) would not be noticed as they once existed. The Lisbon variety (LEP, excluding Setúbal), has merged /e/ to [ɐ] before palatal consonants; e.g. "brasileiro" [bɾɐziˈlɐjru], "coelho" [kuˈɐʎu ~ kuˈɐʲʎu], "sexta-feira" [ˌsɐʃtɐ.ˈfɐjrɐ ~ ˌsɐʲʃtɐ.ˈfɐjrɐ].
- Brazilian Portuguese (BP): /ɐ – a, e – ɛ, o – ɔ/ are raised to /a, e, o/ in middle unstressed syllables (/a, ɛ, ɔ/ in Northeastern varieties), and to /ɐ, i, u/ in final unstressed syllables (however, some varieties, like Carioca Portuguese raise to /a, i, u/ in middle unstressed syllables, when in European Portuguese /ɐ, ɨ, u/ are permissible). In words with consonant sequences (where the first consonant is not mute), the vowels are opened to /aC(ⁱ), ɛC(ⁱ), ɔC(ⁱ)/ in stressed syllables and raised to /aC(ⁱ), ɛC ~ eCⁱ, ɔC ~ oCⁱ/ in unstressed syllables. E.g. abstenção /abstẽˈsɐ̃w̃ ~ abⁱstẽˈsɐ̃w̃/, objeto /ɔbˈʒɛtu ~ obⁱˈʒɛtu/, internet /ĩteɾˈnɛtᶴ ~ ĩteɾˈnɛt^{ʃi}/.
- Angolan Portuguese (AP): /e – ɛ, o – ɔ/ are raised to /e, o/ (/ɨ, u/ also being possible allophones following European Portuguese rules) in middle unstressed syllables, and raised to /ɨ, u/ in final unstressed syllables. In Angolan Portuguese, unlike European Portuguese and Brazilian varieties, /a, ɐ/ merge in complementary distribution to /a/ (even /ɐ̃/ becomes more open /ã/), and /ɐ/ only appears as an allophone in unstressed last syllables. In words with consonant sequences (where the first consonant is not mute), the vowels are opened to /aC, ɛC, ɔC/. E.g. abstenção /abʃtẽˈsãw̃/, objeto /ɔbˈʒɛtu/, internet /ĩteɾˈnɛt/.

=== Palatalization ===
Palatalization of voiceless stops—the consonants [k] and [t] assimilated with the high vowels [e] and [i], and with the semivowel [j].

- centum [ˈkɛntʊ̃ˑ] > Proto-Ibero-Romance [ˈt͡sɛntu] > Galician-Portuguese cento [ˈt͡sɛntu] > Modern Portuguese [ˈsẽtu] (hundred)
- centum [ˈkɛntʊ̃ˑ] > Proto-Ibero-Romance [ˈt͡sɛn] > Galician-Portuguese cen [ˈt͡sɛ̃ŋ] > Modern Portuguese cem [ˈsẽj̃] (EP, BP, AP) ~ [ˈsɐ̃j̃] (LEP) (hundred)
- facere [ˈfakɛrɛ] > Proto-Ibero-Romance [faˈd͡zere] > Galician-Portuguese fazer [faˈd͡zeɾ] > Modern Portuguese fazer [fɐˈzeɾ] (EP) ~ [faˈzeɾ] (BP, AP)

A more ancient evolution was

- Proto-Italo-Western Romance fortiam [ˈfɔrt͡sʲa] > Proto-Ibero-Romance [ˈfɔrt͡sa] > Galician-Portuguese força [ˈfoɾt͡sa] > Modern Portuguese força [ˈfoɾsɐ] (strength)

Palatalization of liquids and nasals—the consonants [l] and [n] assimilated with the semivowel [j], producing the palatals lh [ʎ] and nh [ɲ]:

- mulierem [mʊˈlʲiɛrɛ̃ˑ] > Proto-Ibero-Romance [moˈʎɛre] > Galician-Portuguese moller [moˈʎɛɾ] > Modern Portuguese mulher [muˈʎɛɾ] (woman)
- iūnium [ˈi̯uːniʊ̃ˑ] > Proto-Ibero-Romance [ˈɟuɲu] > Galician-Portuguese junio [ˈd͡ʒuɲo] > Modern Portuguese junho [ˈʒuɲu] (EP) ~ ['ʒũj̃u] (BP, AP) (June)

=== Voicing ===
Voicing—some consonants did not disappear but rather evolved with voiceless stops becoming voiced stops and voiced stops becoming voiced fricatives in certain positions, a common type of sound change:

- mūtum [ˈmuːtʊ̃ˑ] > Proto-Ibero-Romance [ˈmudu] > Galician-Portuguese mudo [ˈmudo] > Modern Portuguese mudo [ˈmudu] (mute)
- lacum [ˈɫakʊ̃ˑ] > Proto-Ibero-Romance [ˈlaɡu] > Galician-Portuguese lago [ˈlaɡo] > Modern Portuguese lago [ˈlaɡu] (lake)
- locustam [ɫɔˈkʊstãˑ] > Proto-Ibero-Romance [laˈɡosta] > Galician-Portuguese lagosta [laˈɡosta] > Modern Portuguese lagosta [lɐˈɡoʃtɐ] (EP) ~ [laˈɡostɐ] (BP) ~ [laˈɡoʃtɐ] (AP) (lobster)

=== Lenition ===
Lenition—consonant clusters, especially long (geminate) consonants, were simplified:

- guttam [ˈɡʊtːãˑ] > Proto-Ibero-Romance [ˈɡota] > Galician-Portuguese gota [ˈɡota] > Modern Portuguese gota [ˈgotɐ] (drop)
- quattuor [ˈkʷatːuɔr] > Proto-Ibero-Romance [ˈkʷatru] > Galician-Portuguese quatro [ˈkʷatɾo] > Modern Portuguese quatro [ˈkʷatɾu] (four)
- peccāre [ˈpɛkːaːrɛ] > Proto-Ibero-Romance [peˈkare] > Galician-Portuguese pecar [peˈkaɾ] > Modern Portuguese pecar [pɨˈkaɾ] (EP) ~ [peˈkaɾ] (BP, AP) (to sin)

Phoneme /b/ evolved as [v]. The /v/ phoneme was generally derived either (1) from an allophone of Latin /b/ between vowels or (2) from the Latin phoneme corresponding to the letter ⟨v⟩ (pronounced [w] in Classical Latin, but later fortified to the status of a fricative consonant in Vulgar Latin).

- habēre [haˈbeːrɛ] > Proto-Ibero-Romance [aˈβere] > Galician-Portuguese haver [aˈβeɾ] > Modern Portuguese haver [ɐˈveɾ] (EP) ~ [aˈveɾ] (BP, AP)
- fabam [ˈfabãˑ] > Proto-Ibero-Romance [ˈfaβa] > Galician-Portuguese fava [ˈfaβa] > Modern Portuguese fava [ˈfavɐ] (broad bean)
- amābam [aˈmaːbãˑ], amābat [aˈmaːbat] > Proto-Ibero-Romance [aˈmaβa] > Galician-Portuguese amava [aˈmaβa] > Modern Portuguese amava [ɐˈmavɐ] (EP) ~ [aˈmavɐ] (BP, AP)
- lībrum [ˈlʲɪbrʊ̃ˑ] > Proto-Ibero-Romance [ˈliβru] > Galician-Portuguese livro [ˈliβɾo] > Modern Portuguese livro [ˈlivɾu]
- parabolam [paˈrabɔɫãˑ] > Proto-Ibero-Romance [paˈraβla] > Galician-Portuguese paravla [paˈɾaβla], palavra [paˈlaβɾa] > Modern Portuguese palavra [pɐˈlavɾɐ] (EP) ~ [paˈlavɾɐ] (BP, AP)

=== Elision ===
Elision—the consonants [l] and [n] of Vulgar Latin were deleted between vowels, after which sometimes the vowels around them coalesced, or an epenthetic semivowel was introduced between them. Original geminates [ll], [nn] persisted, later becoming single [l], [n].

- dolōrem [dɔˈɫoːrɛ̃ˑ] > Proto-Ibero-Romance [doˈlore] > Galician-Portuguese door [doˈoɾ] > Modern Portuguese dor [ˈdoɾ] (pain); borrowed doloroso (painful)
- bonum [ˈbɔnʊ̃ˑ] > Proto-Ibero-Romance [ˈbɔnu] > Galician-Portuguese bõo [ˈbõo] > Modern Portuguese bom [ˈbõ] (good)
- ānellum [aːˈnɛlʲːʊ̃ˑ] > Proto-Ibero-Romance [aˈnɛllu] > Galician-Portuguese ãelo [ɐ̃ˈɛlo] > Modern Portuguese elo [ˈɛlu] (bond); borrowed anel [ɐˈnɛl] (EP) ~ [aˈnɛw] (BP) ~ [aˈnɛl] (AP) (ring)
- salīre [saˈlʲiːrɛ] > Proto-Ibero-Romance [saˈlire] > Galician-Portuguese sair [saˈiɾ] > Modern Portuguese sair [sɐˈiɾ] (EP) ~ [saˈiɾ] (BP, AP) (to get out)
- cōlāre [koːˈɫaːrɛ] > Proto-Ibero-Romance [koˈlare] > Galician-Portuguese coar [koˈar] > Modern Portuguese coar [kuˈaɾ] (EP, BP, AP) ~ [koˈaɾ] (BP, AP) (sift)
- notulam [ˈnɔtʊɫãˑ] > Proto-Ibero-Romance [ˈnɔdola] > Galician-Portuguese nódoa [ˈnɔdoa] > Modern Portuguese nódoa [ˈnɔduɐ] (EP, BP, AP) ~ [ˈnɔdoɐ] (BP, AP) (stain)
- catēnam [kaˈteːnãˑ] > Proto-Ibero-Romance [kaˈdena] > Galician-Portuguese cadẽa [kaˈdẽa] > Modern Portuguese cadeia [kɐˈdejɐ] (EP) ~ [kɐˈdɐjɐ] (LEP) ~ [kaˈdejɐ] (BP, AP) ~ [kaˈdeɐ] (BP, AP) (jail, chain); borrowed cadena [kɐˈdenɐ] (EP) ~ [kaˈdẽnɐ] (BP) ~ [kaˈdenɐ] (AP, BP) (jail, chain)

=== Nasalization ===
In medieval Galician-Portuguese, /m/ and /n/ between vowels or at the end of a syllable became the velar nasal phoneme /ŋ/, leading to regressive nasalization of the preceding vowel as a secondary phonetic effect. This consonant was then at a later stage lost or modified in Portuguese, although it was retained in Galician in some words (e.g. modern unha (/uŋa/) identical in pronunciation to medieval hũa).

This change produced one of the most striking phonological differences between Portuguese and Spanish. The history of nasal vowels in hiatus with a previous or following vowel is complex, depending on the identity of the two vowels and the position of the stress.

1. If the vowels were near each other, they collapsed into a single vowel (nasal or oral, according to the nasality of the stressed vowel):

- bonum [ˈbɔnʊ̃ˑ] > Proto-Ibero-Romance [ˈbɔnu] > Galician-Portuguese bõo [ˈbõo] > Modern Portuguese bom [ˈbõ] (good)
- calentem [kaˈɫɛntɛ̃ˑ] > Proto-Ibero-Romance [kaˈlɛnte] > Galician-Portuguese caẽte [kaˈẽte] > Modern Portuguese quente [ˈkẽtɨ] (EP, AP) ~ [ˈkẽtᶴi] (BP) (hot)
- Proto-Ibero-Romance ganātum [ɡaˈnadu] > Galician-Portuguese gãado [gãˈado] > Modern Portuguese gado [ˈgadu] (cattle)
- lānam [ˈɫaːnãˑ] > Proto-Ibero-Romance [ˈlana] > Galician-Portuguese lãa [ˈlãa] > Modern Portuguese lã [ˈlɐ̃] (EP, BP) ~ [ˈlã] (AP) (wool)

2. Otherwise, if the second vowel was more closed, the result was usually a nasal diphthong:

- manum [ˈmanʊ̃ˑ] > Proto-Ibero-Romance [ˈmanu] > Galician-Portuguese mão [ˈmão] > Modern Portuguese mão [ˈmɐ̃w̃] ~ (EP, BP) [ˈmɐ̃w̃] (AP) (hand)
- canēs [ˈkaneːs] > Proto-Ibero-Romance [ˈkanes] > Galician-Portuguese cães [ˈkães] > Modern Portuguese cães [ˈkɐ̃j̃ʃ] (EP) ~ [ˈkɐ̃j̃s] (BP) ~ [ˈkãj̃ʃ] (AP) (dogs)

3. If the second vowel was more open, or as open, nasalization was lost:

- lūnam [ˈluːnãˑ] > Proto-Ibero-Romance [ˈluna] > Galician-Portuguese lũa [ˈlũa] > Modern Portuguese lua [ˈluɐ] (moon). Exception: ūnam [ˈuːnãˑ] > Proto-Ibero-Romance [ˈuna] > Galician-Portuguese ũa [ˈũa] > Modern Portuguese uma [ˈumɐ] (EP, AP, BP) ~ [ˈũmɐ] (BP) (one). In parts of northern Portugal, however, it is still pronounced [ˈũɐ], but now spelled uma.
- bonam [ˈbɔnãˑ] > Proto-Ibero-Romance [ˈbɔna] > Galician-Portuguese bõa [ˈbõa] > Modern Portuguese boa [ˈboɐ] (good fem.)
- plēnum [ˈpleːnũˑ] > Proto-Ibero-Romance [ˈpʎenu] > Galician-Portuguese chẽo [ˈt͡ʃẽo] > Modern Portuguese cheio [ˈʃeju] (EP, BP, AP) ~ [ˈʃeu] (EP, BP, AP) ~ [ˈʃɐju] (LEP) (full); borrowed pleno ['plenu] (full)

4. If the first vowel was [i], however, nasalization evolved to a palatal nasal consonant, inserted between the two vowels:

- vīnum [ˈu̯iːnʊ̃ˑ] > Proto-Ibero-Romance [ˈβinu] > Galician-Portuguese vinho [ˈβĩo] > Modern Portuguese vinho [ˈviɲu] (EP, BP) ~ [ˈvĩj̃u] (BP, AP) (wine)
- rēgīnam [reːˈɡiːnãˑ] > Proto-Ibero-Romance [reˈɟina] > Galician-Portuguese reinha [reˈĩa] > Modern Portuguese rainha [ʁɐˈiɲɐ] (EP) ~ [ʁaˈiɲɐ] (BP) ~ [ʁaˈĩj̃ɐ] (BP, AP) (queen)

Progressive nasalization—The spread of nasalization forward from a nasal consonant, especially [m].

- mātrem [ˈmaːtrɛ̃ˑ] > Proto-Ibero-Romance [ˈmadre] > Galician-Portuguese mãy ['maj] > Modern Portuguese mãe [ˈmɐ̃j̃] (EP, BP) ~ [ˈmãj̃] (AP) (mother)
- meam [ˈmeãˑ] > Proto-Ibero-Romance [ˈmia] > Galician-Portuguese mia [ˈmia], mĩa [ˈmĩa] > Modern Portuguese minha [ˈmiɲɐ] (EP, BP) ~ [ˈmĩj̃ɐ] (BP, AP) (my fem.); but compare meum [ˈmeʊ̃ˑ] > Proto-Ibero-Romance [ˈmeu] > Galician-Portuguese meu [ˈmeu] > Modern Portuguese meu [ˈmew] (my masc.)
- ad noctem [ad ˈnɔktɛ̃ˑ] > Proto-Ibero-Romance [aˈnoi̯te] > Galician-Portuguese oonte [oˈõte] > Modern Portuguese ontem [ˈõtẽj̃] (EP, BP, AP) ~ [ˈõtɐ̃j̃] (LEP) (yesterday).

=== Epenthesis ===
Epenthesis—the insertion of a sound to break up a sequence of vowels:

- arēnam [äˈreːnãˑ] > Proto-Ibero-Romance [aˈrena] > Galician-Portuguese arẽa [aˈɾẽa] > Modern Portuguese areia [ɐˈɾejɐ] (EP) ~ [ɐˈɾɐjɐ] (LEP) ~ [aˈɾejɐ] (EP, BP, AP) ~ [aˈɾeɐ] (EP, BP, AP) (sand); borrowed arena (arena)
- gallīnam [ɡälˈlʲiːnãˑ] > Proto-Ibero-Romance [ɡalˈlina] > Galician-Portuguese galĩa [ɡaˈlĩa] > Modern Portuguese galinha [ɡɐˈliɲɐ] (EP) ~ [ɡaˈliɲɐ] (BP) ~ [ɡaˈlĩj̃ɐ] (BP, AP) (chicken)
- vīnum [ˈu̯iːnʊ̃ˑ] > Proto-Ibero-Romance [ˈβinu] > Galician-Portuguese vinho [ˈβĩo] > Modern Portuguese vinho [ˈviɲu] (EP, BP) ~ [ˈvĩj̃u] (BP, AP) (wine)

Examples such as these have been used by some authors to argue that the digraph nh was a nasal approximant in medieval Portuguese, and thus its pronunciation [j̃] in most dialects of Brazil and São Tomé and Príncipe is the original one.

- audīre [au̯ˈdiː.rɛ] > Proto-Western-Romance [au̯ˈðir] > Galician-Portuguese ouir [ou̯ˈiɾ] > Modern Portuguese ouvir [owˈviɾ] (EP, AP) ~ [oˈvi(h)] (BP) (hear)

=== Dissimilation ===
Dissimilation—Modification of a sound by the influence of neighboring sounds; similar became different over time.

1. Between vowels:

- locustam [ɫɔˈkʊstãˑ] > Proto-Ibero-Romance [laˈɡosta] > Galician-Portuguese lagosta [laˈɡosta] > Modern Portuguese lagosta [lɐˈɡoʃtɐ] (EP) ~ [laˈɡostɐ] (BP) ~ [laˈɡoʃtɐ] (AP) (lobster)
- campāna [kämˈpaːnãˑ] > Proto-Ibero-Romance [kamˈpana] > Galician-Portuguese campãa [kãmˈpãa] > Modern Portuguese campa [kɐ̃ˈpɐ] (EP, BP) ~ [kãˈpɐ] (AP) (bell)

2. Between consonants:

- memorāre [mɛmɔˈraːrɛ] > Proto-Ibero-Romance [memˈbrare] > Galician-Portuguese nembrar [nẽmˈbɾar] > Modern Portuguese lembrar [lẽˈbɾaɾ] (to remember); borrowed memorizar [mɨmuɾiˈzaɾ] (EP) ~ [memoɾiˈzaɾ] (BP, AP) (to memorize)
- animam [ˈanɪmãˑ] > Proto-Ibero-Romance [ˈalma] > Galician-Portuguese alma [ˈalma] > Modern Portuguese alma [ˈaɫmɐ] (EP, AP) ~ [ˈawmɐ] (BP) (soul); borrowed animado (animated)
- locālem [ɫɔˈkaːɫɛ̃ˑ] > Proto-Ibero-Romance [loˈɡare] > Galician-Portuguese logar [loˈɡaɾ] > Modern Portuguese lugar [luˈgaɾ]; borrowed local [luˈkaɫ] (EP) ~ [loˈkaw] (BP) ~ [loˈkaw] (AP) (place)

=== Metathesis ===
Metathesis—a sound change that alters the order of phonemes in a word. Semi-vowel metathesis:

- prīmārium [priːˈmaːriʊ̃ˑ] > Proto-Ibero-Romance [priˈmei̯ru] > Galician-Portuguese primeiro [pɾiˈmejɾo] > Modern Portuguese primeiro [pɾiˈmejɾu] (EP, BP, AP) ~ [pɾiˈmeɾu] (EP, BP, AP) ~ [pɾiˈmɐjɾu] (LEP) (first); borrowed primário [pɾiˈmaɾiu] (primary)

Consonant metathesis in [l] and [ɾ]:

- tenebrās [ˈtɛnɛbraːs] > Proto-Ibero-Romance [teˈnɛβɾas] > Galician-Portuguese tẽevras [tẽˈevɾas] > Modern Portuguese trevas [ˈtɾɛvɐʃ] (EP, AP) ~ [ˈtɾɛvɐs] (BP) (darkness); this was rare in Portuguese; borrowed tenebroso [tɨnɨˈbɾozu] (EP) ~ [teneˈbɾozu] (BP, AP) (dark)

Vowel metathesis:

- Proto-Romance genuculum [ɡeˈnʊklu] > Proto-Ibero-Romance [ɟeˈnoʎu] > Galician-Portuguese gẽolho [d͡ʒẽˈoʎo] > Modern Portuguese joelho [ʒuˈeʎu] (EP, BP, AP) ~ [ʒoˈeʎu] (BP, AP) ~ [ʒuˈɐʎu] (LEP) (knee)

=== Medieval sound changes ===
Old Portuguese had seven sibilants: lamino-alveolar affricates /ts/ (⟨c⟩ before ⟨e/i⟩, ⟨ç⟩ elsewhere) and /dz/ (⟨z⟩); apico-alveolar fricatives /s/ (⟨s⟩, or ⟨ss⟩ between vowels) and /z/ (⟨s⟩ between vowels); palato-alveolar fricatives /ʃ/ (⟨x⟩) and /ʒ/, earlier /dʒ/ (⟨j⟩, also ⟨g⟩ before ⟨e/i⟩); and palato-alveolar affricate /tʃ/ (⟨ch⟩). This system was identical to the system of Old Spanish, and Portuguese followed the same path as Old Spanish in deaffricating the sibilants /ts/ and /dz/ into lamino-alveolar fricatives that still remained distinct from the apico-alveolar consonants. This produced a system of six fricatives and one affricate, which is still maintained in parts Minho region and northeast Portuguese province of Trás-os-Montes and in the adjacent Mirandese language; but in most places, these seven sounds have been reduced to four.

Everywhere except in the above-mentioned parts of Trás-os-Montes, the lamino-alveolar and apico-alveolar fricatives merged. (This appears to have happened no earlier than the seventeenth century, on the evidence of the spelling system used by Alexandre de Rhodes to represent Middle Vietnamese). In parts of northern Portugal and Galicia, they became apico-alveolars (as in the central and northern peninsular Spanish pronunciation of /s/). In most of Brazil, they became lamino-alveolar consonants (as in the English pronunciation of /s/ and /z/). In central and southern Portugal (and in Rio de Janeiro and surrounding areas, due to the relocation of the Portuguese nobility in the early 1800s), they merged as lamino-alveolars before vowels, but as palato-alveolar /ʃ ʒ/ elsewhere. Meanwhile, /tʃ/ eventually lost its affrication and merged with /ʃ/, although /tʃ/ is maintained throughout Trás-os-Montes and parts of Minho region.

Old Portuguese		Modern Portuguese	
Orthography	Pronunciation	Orthography	Pronunciation
⟨g⟩ before ⟨e⟩, ⟨i⟩ or ⟨j⟩	/dʒ/ → /ʒ/	⟨g⟩ before ⟨e⟩, ⟨i⟩; ⟨j⟩ elsewhere	/ʒ/
⟨g⟩ before ⟨e⟩, ⟨i⟩ or ⟨j⟩	/ʒ/	⟨g⟩ before ⟨e⟩, ⟨i⟩; ⟨j⟩ elsewhere	/ʒ/
⟨ch⟩	/t͡ʃ/	⟨ch⟩	/ʃ/
⟨x⟩	/ʃ/	⟨x⟩	/ʃ/
⟨z⟩	/d͡z̪/ → /z̪/	⟨z⟩	/z̪/
intervocalic ⟨s⟩	/z̺/	intervocalic ⟨s⟩	/z̪/
⟨c⟩ before ⟨e⟩, ⟨i⟩; ⟨ç⟩ before ⟨a⟩, ⟨o⟩, ⟨u⟩	/t͡s̪/	⟨c⟩ before ⟨e⟩, ⟨i⟩; ⟨ç⟩ or ⟨s⟩ before ⟨a⟩, ⟨o⟩, ⟨u⟩	/s̪/
⟨s⟩ in syllable onset or coda; ⟨ss⟩ between vowels	/s̺/	⟨s⟩ in syllable onset or coda; ⟨ss⟩ between vowels	/s̪/

It appears that the sound written ⟨v⟩ was at one point during the medieval period pronounced as a voiced bilabial fricative [β]. Subsequently, it either changed into a labiodental fricative [v] (as in central and southern Portugal, and hence in Brazil), or merged into /b/ (as in northern Portugal and Galicia, similarly to modern Spanish). Also similarly to modern Spanish, the voiced stops /b d ɡ/ eventually became pronounced as fricatives [β ð ɣ] between vowels and after consonants, other than in the clusters /nd/ /ld/ /nɡ/ /mb/ (the nasals were presumably still pronounced in these clusters, rather than simply reflected as a nasal vowel). However, this change happened after the colonization of Brazil, and never affected Brazilian Portuguese.

Final unstressed /a/ was subsequently raised to /ɐ/. Final /o/ was eventually raised to /u/ in both Portugal and Brazil, but independently. Final unstressed /e/ was likewise raised to /i/ in Brazil, but shifted to /ɨ/ in Portugal. In parts of Portugal (but not in Brazil), these changes have come to affect almost all unstressed instances of /a/ /o/ /e/; but not /ou/ (which now appears as /o/ in some parts of the country), nor the former sequences /aa/ /ee/ /oo/ (which now appear as /a/ /ɛ/ /ɔ/ respectively), nor in syllables closed by stop consonants (e.g. in secção "section", optar "to choose"). Hence in Portugal pesar "to weigh" /pɨˈzaɾ/ but pregar "to preach" /prɛˈɡaɾ/ (former preegar < praedicāre); morar "to live" /muˈɾaɾ/, but corado "blushing" /kɔˈɾadu/ (former coorado < colōrātum), roubar "to rob" /ʁoˈbaɾ/. (In Brazil these appear as /peˈzaɾ/, /preˈɡaɾ/, /moˈɾaɾ/, /koˈɾadu/, /hoˈbaɾ/.) Recently in Rio de Janeiro (and rapidly spreading to other parts of Brazil), /t/ and /d/ have been affricated to /tᶴ/ and /dᶾ/ before /i/, including /i/ from unstressed /e/.

Old Portuguese had a large number of occurrences of hiatus (two vowels next to each other with no consonant in between), as a result of the loss of Latin /l n d ɡ/ between vowels. In the transition to modern Portuguese, these were resolved in a complex but largely regular fashion, either remaining, compressing into a single vowel, turning into a diphthong, or gaining an epenthetic consonant such as /v/ or /ɲ/; see above.

Portuguese traditionally had two alveolar rhotic consonants: a flap /ɾ/ and trill /r/, as in Spanish. In many areas of Portugal the trill /r/ has passed into a uvular fricative /ʁ/. In most parts of Brazil, however, /r/ has become an unvoiced fricative /x/ (variously [x χ h]), and all instances of /ɾ/ not preceding a vowel have been likewise affected. (When final, this sound is sometimes not pronounced at all.)

/l/ at the end of a syllable became heavily velarized /ɫ/ in Portuguese. This still remains in Portugal, but in Brazil has progressed further, merging into /w/.

== See also ==
- Differences between Spanish and Portuguese
- Galician language
- History of Galicia
- History of Portugal
- History of Brazil
- List of English words of Portuguese origin
- Portuguese vocabulary
- Romance languages
- Spelling reforms of Portuguese
- Museum of the Portuguese Language
- Portuguese Language Orthographic Agreement of 1990
