= Ramawat ChavliChandu Naik =

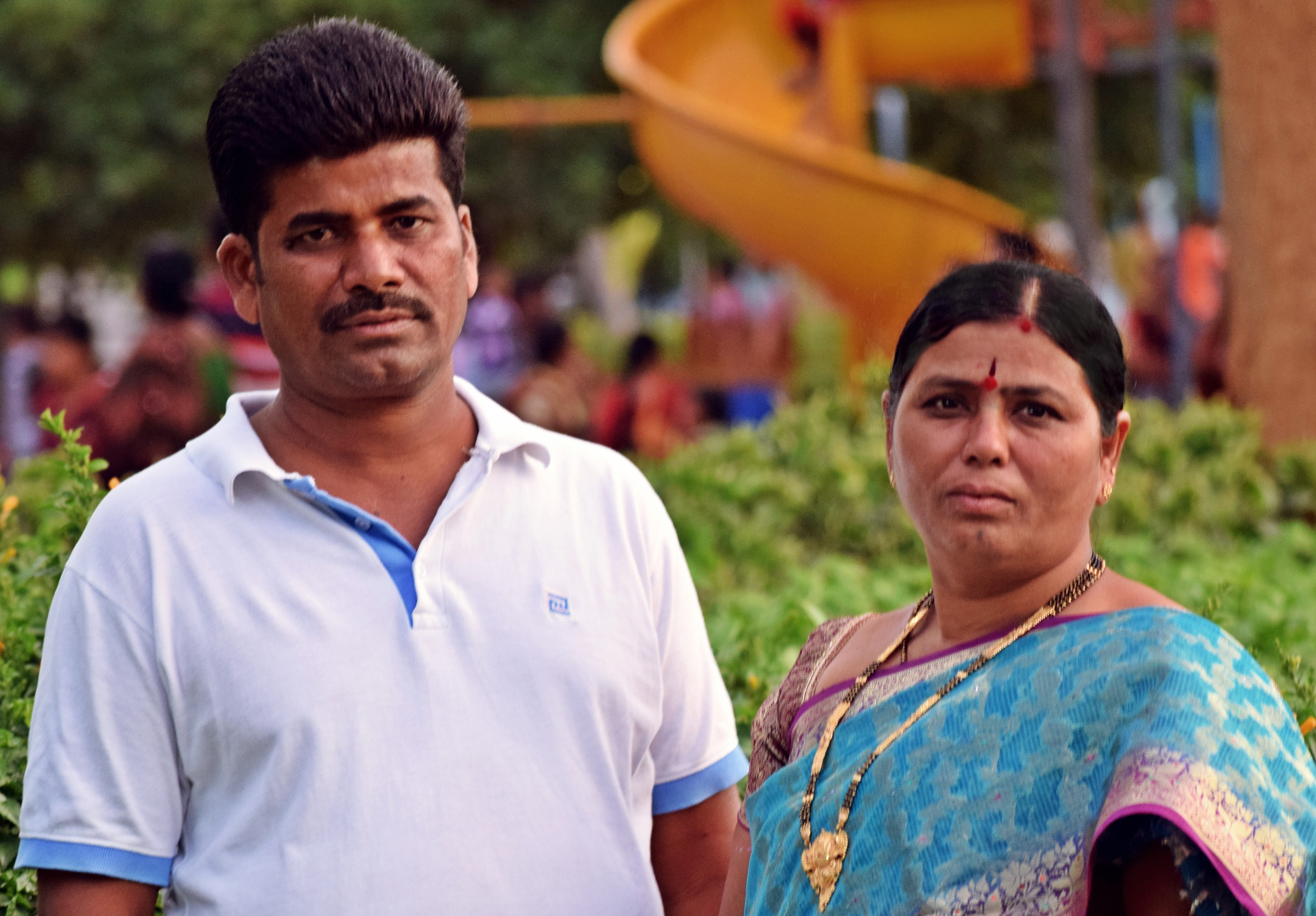

Zilla Parishad Territorial Constituency
- In office December 2006 – May 2011
- Governor: Narayan Dutt Tiwari
- Constituency: Madgul, Kalwakurthy

Personal details
- Born: 1972 (age 53–54) Balu Naik Thanda, Madgul, Telangana, India
- Party: Indian National Congress

Ramawat ChavliChandu Naik (also known as Ramavath Chavlichandu Naik) is an Indian politician and Zilla Parishad Territorial Constituency (Z.P.T.C) from Andhra Pradesh. He represents Madgul, Kalwakurthy constituency. He belongs to Scheduled Tribe, Lamabadi community.

He was elected to Mahabubnagar Territorial Constituency in 2006.

== Personal life ==
Ramawat ChavliChandu Naik was born in Balu Naik Thanda, a hamlet/thanda of Madgul Mandal in Mahbubnagar District, (now this place in located in Rangareddy District) Telangana State. He has been an agriculturist.

== Career ==
Began his political Career / Journey in 2003 with the Indian National Congress from Madugul, Mahabubnagar dist., Telangana.
