= Sevalal Maharaj =

Indian socio-religious reformer and community leader (1739–1806)

Shri Sant Sevalal Maharaj
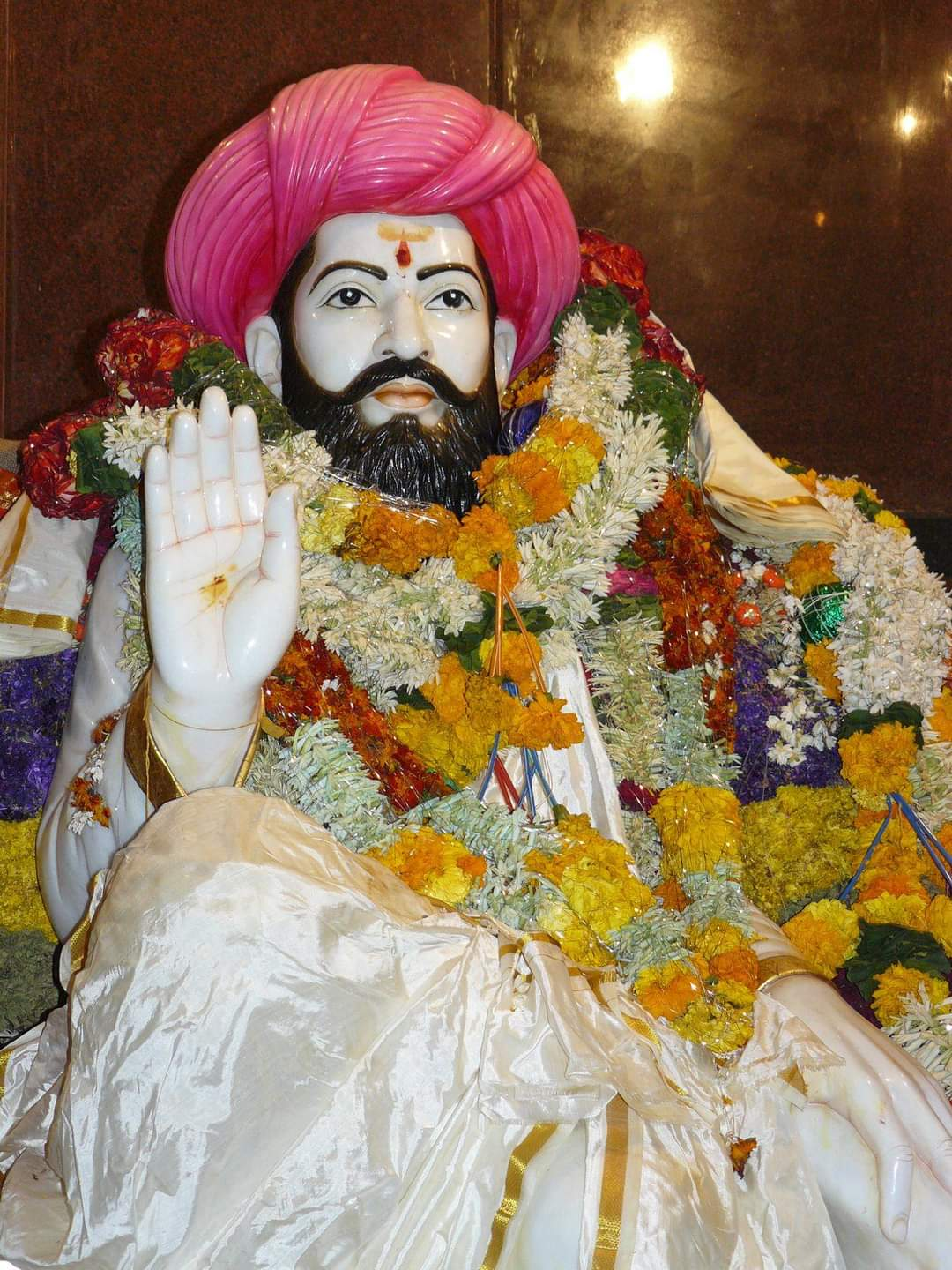
- Born: Seva Bhima Naik; 15 February 1739; Surgondankoppa, Davanagere district, Karnataka, India
- Died: 4 December 1806 (aged 67); Ruhigarh, Yavatmal district, Maharashtra, India
- Resting place: Poharadevi, Washim district, Maharashtra, India
- Occupation: Social reformer (बंजारा समाज दैवत)
- Successor: Sant Ramrao Maharaj, Now (Mahant Babusingh Maharaj)
- Parents: Shri Bheema Naik (father); Dharmani Yadi Bheema Naik (mother)
- Relatives: 1) Shri Badu Bheema Naik (Brother), 2) Shri Hapa Bheema Naik (Brother), 3) Shri Pura Bheema Naik (Brother).

Shri Sant Sevalal Maharaj (15 February 1739 – 4 December 1806) was an Indian socio-religious reformer and community leader. He is revered by the Gor Banjara community as a guru.

== Early life ==
Guru Sevalal Maharaj was born to Bheema Naik Ramawat (father) and Dharamani Mata Bheema Naik Ramawat (mother) in the 18th century. Maharaj had 3 siblings: Shri Badu Bhima Naik Ramawat (Rathod), Shri Happa Bhima Naik Ramawat (Rathod), and Shri Pura Bhima Naik Ramavat (Rathod).

He died at Ruhigarh (Yavatmal District) and was buried at Poharadevi in Washim district, now in the Indian state of Maharashtra.

== Legacy ==
His samadhi stands adjacent to a temple dedicated to goddess Jagadamba devi in Pohradevi. Although he was opposed to personality cults and rituals, it became a popular destination for Banjaras.

Similar temples dedicated to Sevalal and to Jagdamba exist elsewhere and attract many worshipers.

Folk songs praising Sevalal are popular during Banjara festivities. Every Banjara/Gor/Lambadi village or hamlet has a temple for Sri Sevalal Guru. Banjara hoist a pink or red flag for the jagadamba and white colour for him at spiritual sites in every village as a show of reverence and community dignity.

== Banjara Virasat Museum ==
The Banjara Virasat Museum, located in Poharadevi, is dedicated to preserving and showcasing the cultural heritage of the Banjara community. The museum features a 150-foot Sevadhwaj with an equestrian statue of Sant Sevalal Maharaj. It offers daily light and music laser shows, and thirteen galleries of historical exhibits. It aims to establish Poharadevi as a cultural and religious destination.
