= Poharadevi =

Neighbourhood in Washim district, Maharashtra, India

- Neighbourhood
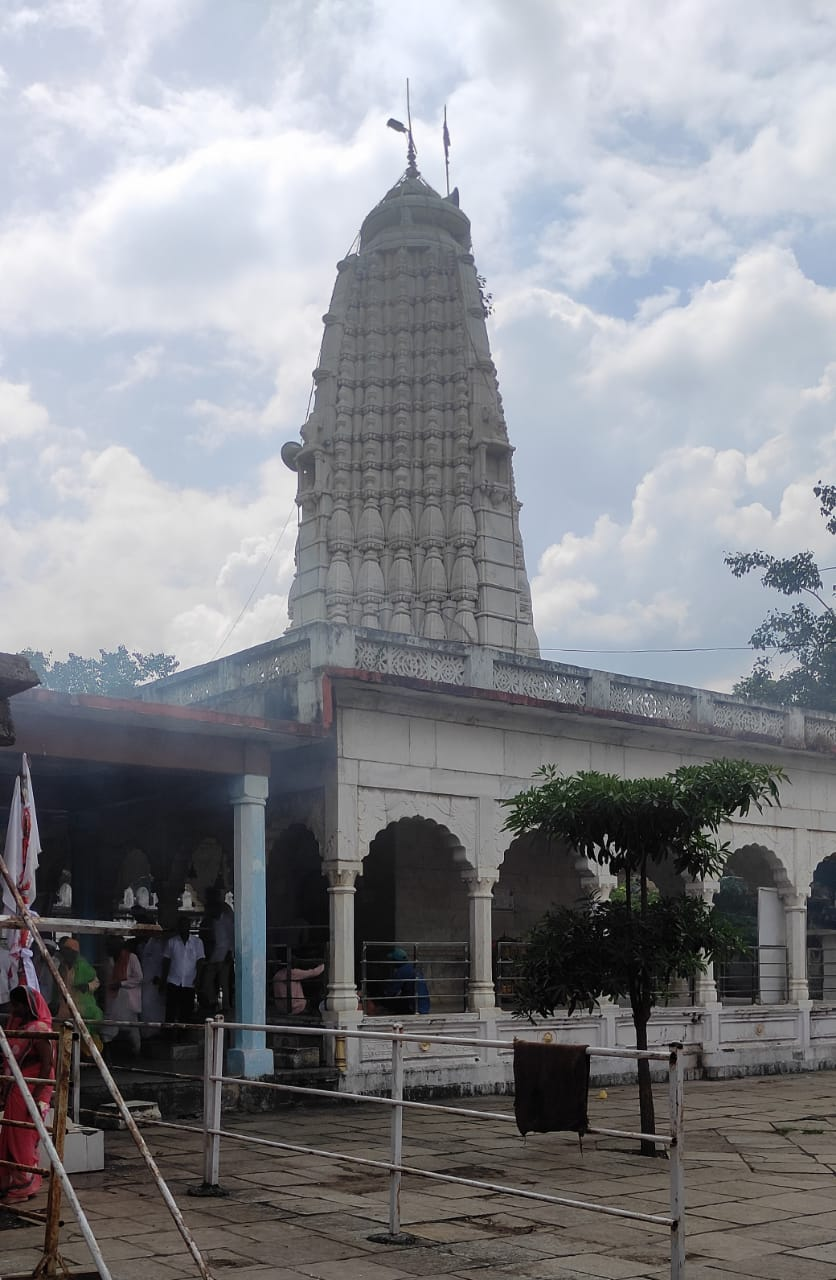
- Jagdamba Mata Temple, Poharadevi, Washim district, Maharashtra

- Poharadevi, Washim district, Maharashtra
- Coordinates: 20.1105°N 77.6271°E
- Country: India
- State: Maharashtra
- District: Washim
- Elevation: 406.18 m (1,332.6 ft)

Population (2011)
  - Total: 4,609

Languages
  - Official: Marathi, English
  - Speech: Lambadi, Marathi, English
- Time zone: UTC+5:30 (IST)
- PIN: 444404
- Other Neighbourhoods: Vasantnagar, Waigaul, Gogjai, Dhawanda, Gondegaon
- LS: Yavatmal - Washim
- VS: Karanja

Poharadevi, a neighbourhood in Manora taluk, Washim district of Maharashtra state in India, is a pilgrimage centre. It is said to be the holy place of Banjara community.

== Location ==
Poharadevi is located with the coordinates of (20.1105°N 77.6271°E) in Washim district.

Poharadevi (Maharashtra)

== Population ==
As per 2011 census of India, Poharadevi had a population of 4,609 out of which males constituted 2,399 and females were 2,210.

== Religion ==
=== Hindu temple ===
There is a Shakti temple named Jagdamba Mata temple in Poharadevi.

== Museum ==
The Banjara Virasat Museum, inaugurated by the prime minister of India, which was dedicated to Banjara community, is situated at Poharadevi.
