= Manora, Washim =

Town in Washim district, Maharashtra state, India

Manora is a town in Washim district, Maharashtra state, India. Nearby are other towns such as Waigaul, Poharadevi, and Asola; they are all religious villages. Manora is situated on the bank of the river named as Arunavati River. It is a central town for nearby villages. All major administrative offices are situated in this town. This town is governed by Nagar Panchayat.

Banjara community forms a sizable population of the region. People from far-off places visit a village of Manora taluka known as Pwradevi or Poharadevi to worship Sevalal Maharaj, the lord of the Banjara community and Banjara Virasat Museum that depicts the lives of the Banjara community.

As far as education is concerned, in Manora, there are many colleges of various studies. We can find a senior college and one ITI college in Manora.

Manora is also known for its bustling market. Manora is a small taluka place, but a large number of small villages are well connected with it.Manora is considered a life-line for the farmers, Since many agro shops are present in this village, farmers can easily sell their farm products in Manora.

As far as religious places are concerned, there are many Hindu temples in the vicinity of Manora town, there are four to five masjids as well. During festive seasons Manorian decorates nook and corner of the town with rangolis and lights. Manora is parted into many areas such as Juni Basti, Rathi Nagar, Vasant Nagar, Madina Nagar, Ramai Nagar and many other areas. Juni Basti is the oldest part of Manora. This part is situated on the bank of The river Arunavati. In this part of town people of various religious beliefs live happily together.

Wednesday is the Bazar Day of Manora, on which people from nearby villages come to purchase day-to-day commodities for the whole week. Traders from other cities also come. Food items ranging from fresh, leafy vegetables to spicy meat and delicious fishes are found in ample quantity. Throughout the week, Manorians have fresh vegetables on the table, the majority of which come from nearby farms.

Schools and Colleges:- In Manora we have Marathi, Urdu and English medium school, in the marathi medium LSPM, Rasht Mata Kaniya Vidyalay, Vasantrao Naik Vidyalay are working since many decades. Rahemaniya Urdu High School and Junior College of arts and science provides education in urdu medium. Sulemaniya Urdu High school and Junior College also provides education in same medium. Sant Wanam Maharaj, Chintamani English School and many others imparts education in english medium.

Year	Male	Female	Total Population	Change	Religion (%)							
Year	Male	Female	Total Population	Change	Hindu	Muslim	Christian	Sikhs	Buddhist	Jain	Other religions and persuasions	Religion not stated
2001	69910	65222	135132	-	85.911	4.337	0.017	0.027	9.463	0.191	0.046	0.009
2011	80931	75413	156344	0.157	85.540	4.772	0.053	0.013	9.052	0.184	0.017	0.369
