= Alatage =

- Village
- Country: India
- State: Karnataka
- District: Belgaum
- Talukas: Belgaum

Languages
  - Official: Kannada
- Time zone: UTC+5:30 (IST)

Alatage is a village in Belgaum district in the southern state of Karnataka, India.

== History ==
A conflict occurred in 2016 over land ownership between the local Banjara community and the rest of the village.
