= Perumandla Sankeesa =

Village in Telangana, India

Perumandla Sankeesa is a village in Dornakal mandal, Mahabubabad District, Telangana. It is 20 km from Khammam town.

This village has a history of more than 1000 years. This village is associates with a thanda. That is Bodarai Thanda. Its population is about 5000.

There are two temples in the village of Lord Rama and Lord Shiva. Lord Rama temple was constructed by the Kakatiya Emperors. and has a history of more than 500 years.
