= List of English words of Portuguese origin =

This is a list of English words borrowed or derived from Portuguese (or Galician-Portuguese). The list also includes words derived from other languages via Portuguese during and after the Age of Discovery. In other Romance languages their imports from Portuguese are often, in a creative shorthand, called lusitanianisms a word which has fallen out of use in English linguistics as etymologists stress that few additions to any non-Iberian Peninsula languages date to the era when the Lusitanian language was spoken. Loan-words and derivations predominantly date to the Age of Discovery when the Portuguese spoken at sea was, according to many accounts, the most widely understood tongue (lingua franca) of the Indian and Atlantic Oceans.

== A-E ==
Açaí
from Portuguese açaí, from Tupi-Guarani asaí
Ainhum
from Portuguese, based on Yoruba eyun 'saw'
Albacore
from albacor from Arabic بكورة al-bukr (= "young tuna")
Albatross
an alteration of albatroz, under influence of the Latin word albus ("white")
Albino
from albino, with the same meaning, from Latin albus
Amah
from Portuguese ama ("nurse, housemaid") from Medieval Latin amma ("mother")
Anhinga
from Portuguese, from Tupi áyinga
Anil
from anil, through French, via Arabic النيل al-nili and Persian نیلا nila; ultimately from Sanskrit नीली nili ("indigo")
Auto-da-fé
a judicial 'act' or sentence of the Inquisition from auto da fé (= "act/sentence of faith")
Ayah
Anglo-Indian native nurse, children's governess from Portuguese aia, originally from Latin avia (grandmother). Etymogically related to English "uncle"
Banana
from Portuguese, of African origin; akin to Wolof banäna banana
Banyan
from Portuguese, from Gujarati vāṇiyo, from Sanskrit vaṇij
Baroque
from barroco (adj. = "unshapely")
Bossa nova
(= "new trend" or "new wave")
Breeze
probably from Old Spanish and Portuguese briza 'northeastern wind
Bual
from boal
Buccaneer
from French boucanier, from boucaner, ("to cure meat"), from boucan, ("barbecue frame"), of Tupian origin, mukém, ("rack"), via Portuguese moquém.
Buffalo
from Portuguese búfalo, from late Latin bufalus, from Greek boubalos 'antelope, wild ox'
Cachalot
from Portuguese cachalote (same meaning), probably via Spanish or French. The Portuguese word comes from cachola ("head" or "big head")
Cachou
from French, from Portuguese cachu, from Malay kacu
Caipirinha
alcoholic cocktail from Brazil spread throughout the world consisting of lime, sugar, cachaça and ice
Capoeira
a popular Brazilian dance of African origin incorporating martial arts movements
Carambola
Star fruit – Portuguese, perhaps from Marathi कराम्बल karambal
Caramel
via French and Spanish, from Portuguese caramelo, 'caramel', from Late Latin calamellus. Typical Portuguese rhotacism of the letter "L".
Caravel
from caravela
Carbonado
from Portuguese
Carnauba
from carnaúba
Cashew
from caju (a tropical fruit)
Caste
from casta (= "class")
Cobra
shortening of cobra-de-capelo, with the same meaning (literally, "snake [cobra] with a hood")
Coconut
from coco + nut
Commando
from comando 'command'
Cougar
from French couguar, from Portuguese suçuarana, perhaps from Tupian sɨwasuarána or Guaraní guaçu ara.
Creole
French créole, from Castilian Spanish criollo, person native to a locality, from Portuguese crioulo, diminutive of cria, ("'person raised in one's house with no blood relation, a servant'"), < Portuguese criar ("'to rear, to raise, to bring up'"), from Latin creare, to beget; < Latin creo ("'to create'"), which came into English via French between 1595 and 1605. [same root as creature]
Cuspidor
from Portuguese, spitter, from cuspir 'to spit'
Dodo
According to Encarta Dictionary and Chambers Dictionary of Etymology, "dodo" comes from Portuguese doudo (currently, more often, doido) meaning "fool" or "crazy". The present Portuguese word dodô ("dodo") is of English origin. The Portuguese word doudo or doido may itself be a loanword from Old English (cp. English "dolt")
Embarrass
from Portuguese embaraçar (same meaning; also to tangle – string or rope), from em + baraço (archaic for "rope")
Emu
from ema (= "rhea")

== F-N ==
Farofa
typical dish of Brazil
Feijoada
typical Portuguese and Brazilian stew. Used during the 2014 Scripps National Spelling Bee.
Fetish
from French fétiche, from Portuguese feitiço ("charm", "sorcery", "spell"), from Latin factitius or feticius ("artificial")
Flamingo
from Portuguese flamingo, from Spanish flamenco
Genipapo
from Portuguese jenipapo, from Tupi
Grouper
from garoupa
Guarana
from Portuguese guaraná, from Tupi warana
Igarapé
from Tupi : Area with trees near of rivers with the roots in the water.
Indigo
from Spanish indico, Portuguese endego, and Dutch (via Portuguese) indigo, from Latin indicum, from Greek indikon 'blue dye from India'
Jacaranda
from Tupi yakaranda.
Jackfruit
from Portuguese jaca, from Malayalam chakka + fruit
Jaggery
from Portuguese xagara, jag(a)ra, from Tamil cakkarai, from Malayalam cakkarā, from Sanskrit śarkarā
Jaguar
from Tupi or Guaraní jaguarete via Portuguese
Junk
from junco, from Javanese djong (Malay adjong).
Konpeitō
Japanese sweets, from the Portuguese confeito (sugar candy)
Labrador
from the name of Portuguese explorer João Fernandes Lavrador, the surname meaning "landowner" or "farmer".
Lacquer
from French lacre, from Portuguese lacre, from Arabic lakk, from Persian lak
Lambada
from lambada (="beating, lashing")
Lascar
from Portuguese lascari, from Urdu and Persian laškarī 'soldier', from laškar 'army'.
Launch
from Portuguese lancha, from Malay lancharan 'boat'.
Lingo
perhaps from Old Portuguese lingoa, today's língua, ("language", "tongue") related to Old Provençal lengo, lingo. Or perhaps, from Polari slang, ultimately from Italian lingua franca. Polari is a distinctive English argot in use since at least the 18th century among groups of theatrical and circus performers and in certain homosexual communities, derived largely from Italian, directly or through Lingua Franca. Sailors' expressions from the 16th century passed on to 19th century English 'gay' culture, and vaudeville theatrical world, including words derived from a variety of sources such as Italian, Romani, Yiddish, and British rhyming slang.
Macaque
from macaco, through French
Macaw
from macau; ultimately from Tupi macavuana.
Mandarin
from mandarim, from the Malay mantri, from Hindi मंत्री matri, from Sanskrit मन्त्रिन् mantrin (="counsellor")
Mango
from manga, via Malay mangga, ultimately from Malayalam മാങ്ങ māṅṅa or from Tamil மாங்காய் mānkāy
Mangrove
probably from Portuguese mangue mangrove (from Spanish mangle, probably from Taino) + English grove
Manioc
from mandioca (="cassava") from Tupi mandioca.
Maraca
from maracá from Tupi
Marimba
from Portuguese, of Bantu origin; akin to Kimbundu ma-rimba : ma-, pl. n. pref. + rimba, xylophone, hand piano
Marmalade
from marmelada, a preserve made from marmelo (="quince")
Molasses
from melaço (="treacle")
Monsoon
from monção
Mosquito
from mosquito meaning 'little fly'
Mulatto
Portuguese mulato. From mula (=mule) a cross between a horse and a donkey or from the Arabic term muwallad, which means "a person of mixed ancestry"
Negro
Negro means "black" in Spanish and Portuguese being from the Latin word niger (Dative nigro, Accusative nigrum) and the Greek word Νέγρος Negros both of the same meaning. It came to English through the Portuguese and Spanish slave trade. Prior to the 1970s, it was the dominant term for Black people of African origin; in most English language contexts (except its inclusion in the names of some organizations founded when the term had currency, e.g. the United Negro College Fund), it is now considered either archaic or a slur.

== P-Z ==
Pagoda
from pagode; corruption of Persian بوتکاتا butkata (+"idol deity")
Palanquin
from Portuguese palanquim, from Oriya pālaṅki
Palaver
a chat, from palavra (="word"), parabola (parable), speech (current fala, discurso), chat (current bate-papo, papo, palavrinha, conversa and also Eng. chat) alteration of Late Latin parabola, speech, parable.
Pickaninny
from pequenina (="little one") or pequeninha (="toddler")
Piranha
from piranha (=piranha), from Tupi pirá ("fish") + ánha ("cut")
Pomfret
from Portuguese pampo
Potato
from batata
Ramkie
from Afrikaans, from Nama rangi-b, perhaps from Portuguese rabequinha diminutive of rabeca 'fiddle'
Rapadura
from Portuguese raspar
Sablefish
from sável (="shad," "whitefish")
Samba
from samba; ultimately of Angolan origin, semba
Sargasso
from sargaço (="sargasso")
Savvy
from sabe he knows, from saber to know
Serval
from French, from Portuguese (lobo-)cerval 'Iberian lynx', from Latin cervarius
Stevedore
from estivador (="stevedore")
Talapoin
from French, from Portuguese talapão
Tank
from tanque
Tapioca
from tapioca
Teak
from teca
Tempura
Japanese 天麩羅 tenpura, also written as 天ぷら, from Portuguese têmporas, (=Ember Days)
Verandah
from varanda (="balcony" or "railing"), from Hindi वरांडा varanda or Bengali baranda
Vindaloo
probably from Portuguese vinha d'alhos 'wine and garlic (sauce)', from vinho 'wine' + alho 'garlic' or possibly from vinagre 'vinegar' + alho 'garlic'
Yam
from inhame or Spanish ñame from West African nyama (="eat")
Zebra
from zebra (same meaning), which started as the feminine form of zebro (a kind of deer), from vulgar Latin eciferus, classical Latin EQUIFERVS.
Zombie
from the word zumbi, first recorded in 1819 in a history of Brazil by the poet Robert Southey. This word is given West African origin by the Oxford English Dictionary, and was incorporated into the Portuguese language by interaction with enslaved Africans in Brazil.

== See also ==
- Lists of English words by country or language of origin
