= Balu Naik Thanda =

- Village / Thanda
- Location in Telangana, India Balu Naik Thanda (India)
- Coordinates: 16.851024°N 78.689707°E
- Country: India
- State: Telangana
- District: Ranga Reddy

Significant Features
  - Languages: Lambadi / Bangala, Telugu
- Time zone: UTC+5:30 (IST)
- PIN: 509327
- Telephone code: 08545
- Nearest city: Hyderabad
- Lok Sabha constituency: Nagarkurnool
- Vidhan Sabha constituency: kalwakurty
- Website: www.balunaikthanda.tk

Balu Naik Thanda (also known as Balu Thanda or Janu Thanda) is a village/thanda in Ranga Reddy district, Telangana, India. It falls under Madgul Mandal and is 3 kilometres (1.9 mi) from there.

== Economy and education ==
The traditional commerce are agriculture and trade. Lambanis are also nomadic cattle herders. and how a day people have been employed mostly in Studying and farming.

The village has a primary school and most of the youths in thanda are literate and a few are pursuing Graduates and Post-Graduates Courses in Education and very few are employed.
