= Lambada embroidery =

Indian tribal embroidery art

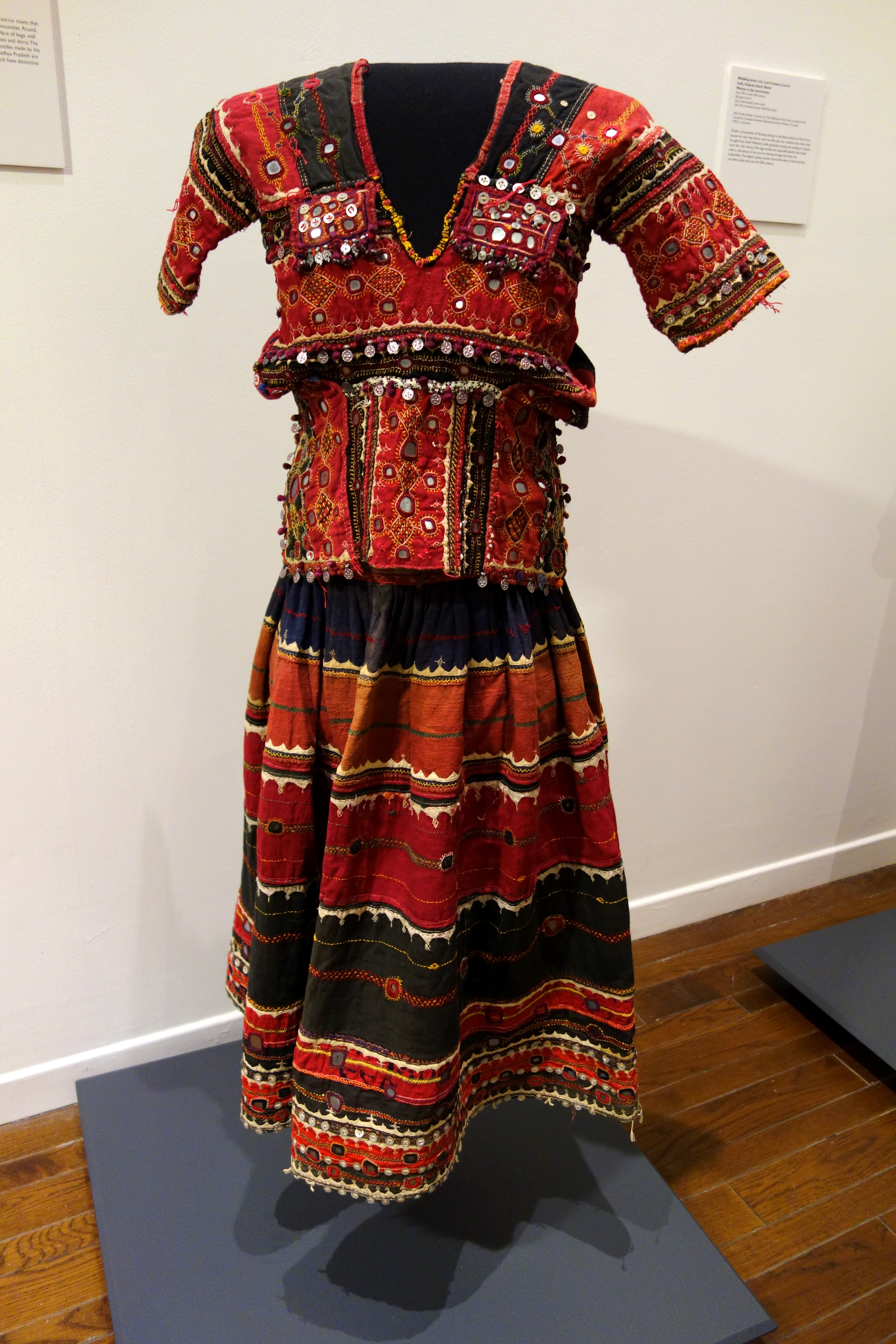
Traditional Banjara dress consisting of kanchali (blouse) and phetiya (skirt)

Lambada embroidery (lambadi embroidery, Lambani, Sandur Lambani embroidery, Banjara embroidery, lepo) is the art of embellishing clothes, practiced by the Banjara, a tribe in Sanduru, Bellary, and Bijapur in Karnataka, and Hyderabad in Telangana. Lambada embroidery consists of a combination of patchwork, appliqué, beadwork, and embroidery.

== Technique ==
Lambada embroidery uses a combination of stitches and appliqué, along with other embellishments. Tribal women use coins, shells, buttons, cowries, and small pieces of mirrors to decorate their colorful costumes, which include a phetiya (skirt) and kanchali (blouse). The motifs are mainly geometrical, with gridlike patterns.

== Recognition ==
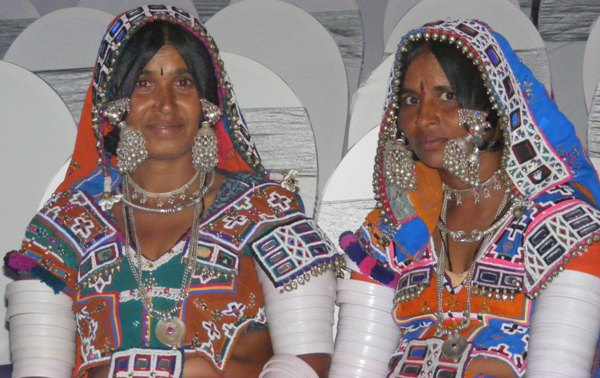
Banjara women in traditional dress

Sandur Lambani embroidery was granted a geographical indication in India in 2010.

== Use ==
Other than costumes, the artform is used on a variety of products like cushion covers, bedcovers, wall hangings, and other garments, and accessories like bags, headbands, belts, etc.
