= Fernão de Oliveira =

Portuguese priest and grammarian (1507-c.1581)

Fernando de Oliveira
- Born: 1507; Portugal
- Died: 1582
- Occupations: Writer, dominican novice, ship pilot, spy, diplomat, professor of rhetoric
- Known for: Writing first portuguese grammar
- Notable work: Grammatica da lingoagem portuguesa (1536) Arte da guerra no mar (1555) Livro da fábrica das naus História de Portugal
- Criminal charges: Heresy

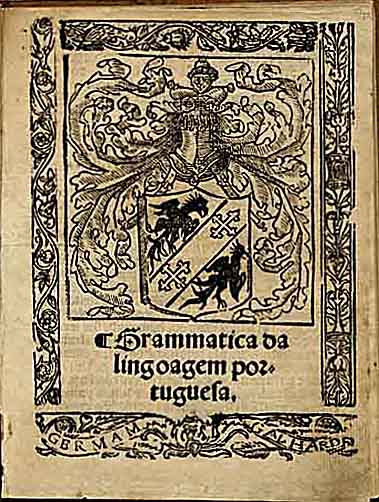
Grammatica of the Portuguese language of Fernão De Oliveira, January 27, 1536.

Fernão de Oliveira (1507 – c.1581), sometimes named Fernando de Oliveira or Fernando Oliveira, was a Portuguese grammarian, Dominican friar, historian, cartographer, naval pilot and theorist on naval warfare and shipbuilding. An adventurous humanist and renaissance man, he studied and published the first grammar of the Portuguese language, the Grammatica da lingoagem portuguesa, in 1536. He was an early critic of slavery and the slave trade.

== Biography ==
Fernão de Oliveira was born in Aveiro in 1507, the son of a judge. Starting in 1520, he studied at the Dominican Convent of Évora, where he was a disciple of André de Resende, but later left for Spain. In 1536 he was in Lisbon, when he published his Grammar, the first for the Portuguese Language.

He had a troubled adventurous life, engaging in secret religious missions in Italy, perhaps for king John III of Portugal. In 1545 he enlisted as pilot on a French ship, under command of the Baron Saint Blancard. Soon afterwards, they were arrested by an English fleet. While in London he attended the court of Henry VIII of England. Having returned to Portugal in 1547, he was arrested by the Portuguese Inquisition due to his religious opinions (his stay in Henry's court had influenced his views); he was freed in 1551, through the intervention of Cardinal Henrique.

In 1552, he became royal chaplain. He joined in an expedition organized by king John III in North Africa, where he was made prisoner for a year. In 1554, D. John III appointed him typographical reviewer of the University of Coimbra, where he also taught rhetoric. From 1555 to 1557, he was again imprisoned. After this period, his life becomes uncertain. It is known that, in 1565, he received a pension from king Sebastian of Portugal.

Following the deaths of king Sebastian in Ksar el-Kebir, in 1578, and the death of king-cardenal Henrique, in 1580, Philip II of Spain claimed to be the rightful king of Portugal as king Philip I and succeeded to conquer the kingdom, being recognized in the Cortes of Tomar. In face of this, Fernando sided with António, Prior of Crato, writing his História de Portugal, where he defends that Portugal is the oldest country in the Iberian Peninsula, wich he left unfinished due to his death. It is suggested by some scholers that he moved to France and there died, this theory is supported by the fact that the manuscript of História de Portugal is in France.

He died c. 1581-2.

== Works ==
Fernão de Oliveira wrote, among other:

- Grammatica da lingoagem portuguesa (Grammar of the Portuguese Language), 1536, printed in Lisbon by Germão Galharde (2ª ed. em 1871; 3ª ed. em 1936; 4ª ed. em 1975; 5ª ed. em 1981; 6ª ed. em 1988; 7ª ed. em 2000);
- Livro da Fabrica das Naos (Book of naus' shipbuilding), c. 1580, manuscript in the National Portuguese Library (published by Henrique Lopes de Mendonça in 1898; 2ª ed. em 1991; 3ª ed. em 1995);
- Arte da guerra do mar (The art of sea warfare), printed in Coimbra in 1555 (2ª ed. em 1937; 3ª ed. em 1969; 4ª ed. em 1983),
- Ars nautica, (Nautical art) c. 1570, manuscript in Leiden Library,
- Historea de Portugal, (History of Portugal), after 1581 (texto apresentado por Pierre Valere, publ. in Nantes 1975).
- A Viage de Fernão de Magalhães, escripta p hu homem q foy na copanhia, c. 1570, ms. in Leiden Library,
- Livro da Antiguidade, Nobreza, Liberdade e Imunidade do Reino de Portugal (c. 1579/80, ms. in BNParis)
- Historia de Portugal de Fernando Oliveira (copiada em 1831 por António Nunes de Carvalho; in Fundo da Biblioteca da Univ. Católica Portuguesa)
