= Vasantnagar =

- Census town
- Location in Maharashtra, India
- Coordinates: 19.6938°N 77.6024°E
- Country: India
- State: Maharashtra
- District: Yavatmal

Population (2001)
  - Total: 4,117

Languages
  - Official: Marathi
- Time zone: UTC+5:30 (IST)

Vasantnagar is a census town in Yavatmal district in the Indian state of Maharashtra.

== Demographics ==
As of 2001 India census, Vasantnagar had a population of 4117. Males constitute 54% of the population and females 46%. Vasantnagar has an average literacy rate of 56%, lower than the national average of 59.5%: male literacy is 66%, and female literacy is 45%. In Vasantnagar, 16% of the population is under 6 years of age.

The vasant Sahakari Sakhar Karkhana Ltd., Pusad is situated in backward region of vidarbha near village Post -Pophali, in umarkhed Taluka, Dist-Yavatmal In Maharashtra State. The Factory is licensed during 1/7/1969 with a view to develop the sugarcane in the area of operation of the factory and socio-economic development of the sugarcane cultivators in the area, Late Shri.Vasantrao Naik, Former Chief Minister of Maharashtra State decided to establish a sugar factory in the cooperative sector. Under the valuable guidance of Funder Chairman Late Shri. Jethamalji Maheshwari . The factory commenced it crushing operations (1250 TCD) in 1972-73. In view of the excess planting of sugarcane in the crushing season 1994-95 and with a view to crush the entire sugarcane to avoid the financial loss of the sugarcane cultivators, Industry have expanded our plant 1250 TCD to 2500 TCD.
