= Poharadevi Jagdamba Mata Temple =

Shakti temple in Washim district, Maharashtra, India

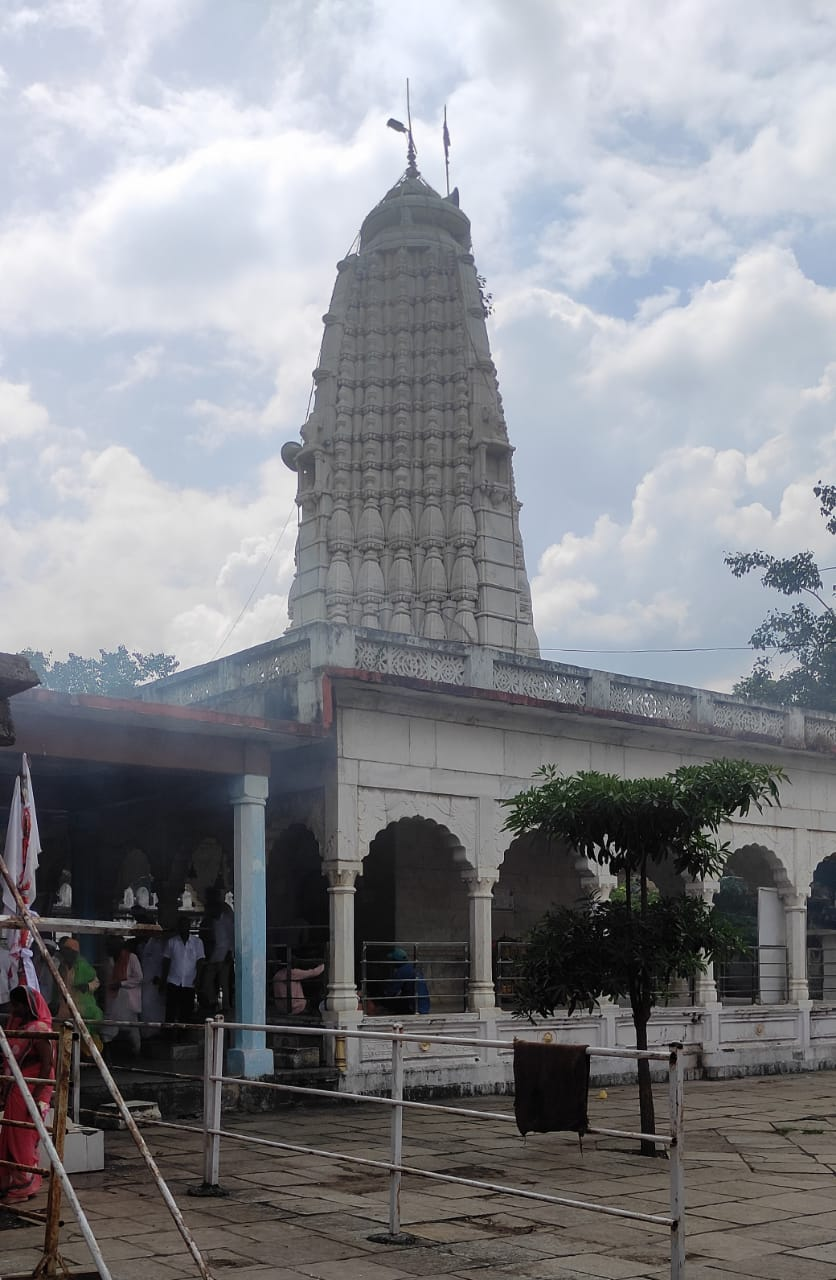
- Jagdamba Mata Temple at Poharadevi, Washim district, Maharashtra

- Jagdamba Mata Temple at Poharadevi, Washim district, Maharashtra

Religion
- Affiliation: Hinduism
- District: Washim
- Deity: Jagdamba Mata

Location
- Location: Poharadevi
- State: Maharashtra
- Country: India
- Interactive map of Poharadevi Jagdamba Mata Temple
- Coordinates: 20.1078°N 77.6301°E

Architecture
- Type: Architecture of Maharashtra

Specifications
- Temple: One
- Elevation: 406.79 m (1,335 ft)

Poharadevi Jagdamba Mata Temple is a Shakti temple at Poharadevi neighbourhood of Washim district of Maharashtra state in India.

== Location ==
This temple is located with the coordinates of (20.1078°N 77.6301°E) at Poharadevi, which is one of the important pilgrimage centres of Maharashtra.

Poharadevi Jagdamba Mata Temple (Maharashtra)

== Importance ==
The Prime minister of India visited this temple on 5 October 2024. He performed a ceremonial puja and prayed there. And he played drums kept at the premises of the temple.
