= Banjara literature =

Modern and Folklore Literary Forms of the Banjara Language

Banjara Literature is primarily found in the Devanagari script today. It is regarded as the literature of Banjara linguistics. Cultural consciousness and the acceptance of social values are deeply embedded in Banjara literature. This includes folklore, religious stories, narratives, songs, roleplays, and proverbs. Over time, Banjara literature has experienced significant changes, with an increasing amount being produced in Devanagari script. Additionally, Banjara literature is being promoted through regional languages. Since the Banjara people have their own language, the literature produced from it is known as 'Banjara literature'.

== Background ==
Banjara literature has largely been preserved in the form of folk and oral literature. Literature is often described as a mirror of society, reflecting various aspects of social life. According to Namvar Singh, "Literature is the voice of the complete personality of a human being, a reflection of the unit of expressed genes." From the renowned social reformer and early historian Baliramji Patil to contemporary creative writers like Eknath Pawar Nayak experts on Gor Banjara literature and culture, this period is considered pivotal for the enrichment of Banjara literature and culture. Baliram Patil was Great Historian and Social Reformer of Banjara Community And Eknath Pawar is known as the pioneer of the Maharashtra Gor Banjara Sahitya Akademi as he has made great contributions towards the establishment of this academy and the preservation of Banjara literature and culture.

== History ==
Banjara literature, along with folk literature, played a significant role in shaping Banjara literary traditions during the ancient and medieval periods. It is believed that Banjara literature has a rich historical heritage. The revolution in Western countries introduced diverse ideologies, leading to substantial changes in Indian social, cultural, and literary landscapes both before and after independence. This period marked the beginning of significant transformations in Banjara literature and culture.

Historian and writer Baliram Patil modernised the focus on Banjara literature and culture, while Atmaram Rathore highlighted the plight of Tanda Village through his characters. Modern Banjara literary historians and contributors include Maheshchandra Banjara, Padmashree Somlal Nayak, Dr. Ramkoti Pawar, Motiraj Rathore, Mohan Nayak, Eknath Pawar Nayak, Ramesh Arya, Jairam Pawar, Ashokrao Pawar, Veera Rathore, Ramesh Kartik, Indersingh Baljot, among others. These talented litterateurs, poets, and writers have played a crucial role in preserving and advancing Banjara literary heritage.

The influence of aestheticism, Hinduism, vitalism, and modernism began to permeate Banjara literature. Notable figures such as Nazeer Akbarabadi, Rabindranath Tagore, Acharya Shriram Sharma, and Pandit Gaurishankar Ojha have shed light on Banjara culture. Literature in Devanagari script, including works in Hindi, Marathi, Telugu, Kannada, and rural and primitive literatures, has seen a significant increase in production.

Baliram Patil introduced the first reformatory Barahkhadi to Banjara Tanda, Atmaram Rathore contributed the rebellious Barahkhadi of change, and Eknath Pawar provided the creative Choudahkhadi of constitutional awareness. This literary evolution has played a crucial role in advancing Banjara literature. The period from Baliram Patil to Eknath Pawar is regarded as a golden age of Banjara literature, inspiring new generations and significantly contributing to its global recognition. 'Nagara' is recognized as a classic epic in the Banjara language that preserves and promotes universal human values. Composed by the renowned litterateur and thinker Eknathrao Pawar Nayak, this famous epic is divided into four sections, yet its core essence remains universal human welfare. Since the central theme of this epic primarily revolves around 'One Earth-One Family' (Ek Dharti Ek Parivar), every poem within it has become the voice of humankind and humanity.
