= Madgul =

- Mandal
- Location in Telangana, India Madgul (India)
- Coordinates: 16.851411°N 78.689232°E
- Country: India
- State: Telangana
- District: Ranga Reddy

Languages
  - Official: Telugu, Lambadi
- Time zone: UTC+5:30 (IST)
- PIN Code: 509327
- Telephone code: 08543
- ISO 3166 code: IN-TG
- Vehicle registration: TG-22
- Nearest City: Hyderabad
- Lok Sabha Constituency: Nagarkurnool
- Vidhan Sabha Constituency: Kalwakurthy
- Climate: hot (Köppen)
- Website: telangana.gov.in

Madgul is a Mandal in Ranga Reddy district, Telangana, India. It is located 103 km from Mahabubnagar and 76 km from state headquarters Hyderabad. It is the home town of politician Jaipal Reddy who served as the member of legislative assembly from Kalwakurthy.

== Villages ==
Sl No	Village Name	Village Code
1	Andugul	575307
2	Anneboinpalle	575302
3	Appareddipalle	575296
4	Arkapalle	575305
5	Aurpalle	575293
6	Brahmanapalle	575301
7	Dodlapahad	575294
8	Girikothapalle	575306
9	Irwin	575300
10	Kalakonda	575299
11	Kulkulpalle	575297
12	Madgul	575298
13	Nagilla	575295
14	Ramanampalle	575303
15	Suddapalle	575304
16	Narsaiah Pally	575305
