= Thanda =

Small tribal settlement in India

A thanda is a clustered human settlement or community of Banjaras, a term for nomadic tribes in India. It is equal to a hamlet but smaller than a village, with a population of a few hundred. They are often located in rural areas (tribal areas) with jubdas (huts) as shelter.

In the 1990s, thanda were normally temporary places of living because the Banjaras were transient. However, the people are now settling permanently and have fixed dwellings. Further, the dwellings of a thanda are fairly close to one another, not scattered broadly over the landscape, as a dispersed settlement.
