= Lambadi =

Indo-Aryan language of India

Lambani
- Lambadi, Lamani, Banjari
- लम्बाडी, ಲಂಬಾಣಿ, லம்பாடி, లంబాణి
- Two Lambada young men from Telangana discussing in Lambadi, 2019
- Native to: India
- Ethnicity: Banjara
- Native speakers: 4,857,819 (2011 census)
- Language family: Indo-European: Indo-Iranian; Indo-Aryan; Western; Rajasthani; Lambani

Language codes
- ISO 639-3: lmn
- Glottolog: lamb1269
- Lambadi is classified as "vulnerable" by the UNESCO Atlas of the World's Languages in Danger

- Person: Lamban/Lambadi
- Language: Lambani

Lambadi, Lambani, Lamani or Banjari is a Western Indo-Aryan language spoken by the Banjara people across India. The language does not have a native script.

== Bibliography ==
- Boopathy, S. Investigation & report in: Chockalingam, K., Languages of Tamil Nadu: Lambadi: An Indo-Aryan Dialect (Census of India 1961. Tamil Nadu. Volume ix)
- Trail, Ronald L. 1968. The Grammar of Lamani.
- Davis, Irvine (1970). The Grammar of Lamani (PDF). SIL International.

== Gallery ==
Karnataka Lamani Folk Song - by Rukumavva Chennappa Kattimani, Rupalabai Rathod, Shanta Somu Lamani and team

Karnataka Lamani Folk Song - by Rukumavva Chennappa Kattimani, Rupalabai Rathod, Shanta Somu Lamani and team

Karnataka Lambani Celebration Dance - by Rukumavva Chennappa Kattimani, Rupalabai Rathod, Shanta Somu Lamani and team

Karnataka Lambani Folk Song - by Rukumavva Chennappa Kattimani, Rupalabai Rathod, Shanta Somu Lamani and team

Karnataka Lambani Folk Song - by Rukumavva Chennappa Kattimani, Rupalabai Rathod, Shanta Somu Lamani and team
