= Banjara people =

Indian nomadic tribes

Banjara
बंजारा

Regions with significant populations
- India

Languages
- Lambadi

Religion
- Hinduism

The Banjara (also Lambāda or Lamāna) are nomadic tribes found in India. Their native language is Lambadi.

== Etymology ==
The Gor usually refer to themselves as Banjaras and outsiders as Kor, but this usage does not extend outside their own community. A related usage is Gor Mati or Gormati, meaning "own people". Motiraj Rathod believes that the community became known as banjara from around the fourteenth century AD and previously had some association with the Laman, who claim a 3,000-year history.

Historian Irfan Habib believes the origin of banjara lies in the Sanskrit word variously rendered as vanij, vanik, and banik, as does the name of the Bania caste, which historically was India's "pre-eminent" trading community. However, according to the author B. G. Halbar, the word banjara is derived from the Sanskrit vana chara. (Note: Sumahan Bandyopadhyay says something fairly similar: "Derived from ban and charan, meaning 'wanderers of forest' or 'cattle grazers'.)

The group is known by different names in different parts of the country, including Gor Banjara, Baladiya, Gor, Gour Rajput, Rajput Banjara, Ladaniya, Labana, Nayak, Gawaria, etc. Despite the community adopting a multitude of languages, banjara is used throughout India, although in Karnataka, the name is altered to banijagaru. A survey conducted in 1968 by the All India Banjara Seva Sangh, a caste-based association, recorded 27 synonyms and 17 subgroups.

== History ==
According to author J. J. Roy Burman, Banjaras have settled across Rajasthan and other parts of India. Together with the Bhopa, Domba, and Kalbelia, they are sometimes called the "gypsies of India".

Halbar has stated that most nomadic communities believe that they are descended from Rajput ancestry. They claim that during the Mughal Empire, they retreated to the forests and vowed to return only when the foreign influence had gone. According to Halbar, they appear to be of mixed ethnicity, possibly originating in north-central India. Irfan Habib writes that their constituent groups may not in fact share a common origin, with the theories that suggest otherwise reflecting the systemic bias of 19th-century British ethnographers who were keen to create simple classifications. Laxman Satya states that "Their status as Banjaras was circumscribed by the colonial state disregarding the rich diversity that existed among various groups".

Although not referred to as Banjara until the 16th century, Habib believes that the royal court chroniclers Ziauddin Barani and Shaikh Nasiruddin documented them operating in the Delhi Sultanate some centuries earlier, around the time of the rule of Alauddin Khalji. Halbar dates things earlier, suggesting that Dandin, a Sanskrit writer who lived in the 6th century, refers to them but, again, not by name.

=== Activities ===
Banjaras were historically pastoralists, traders, breeders, and transporters of goods in the inland regions of India, for which they used boats, carts, camels, oxen, donkeys, and sometimes the relatively scarce horse, hence controlling a large section of trade and economy. The mode of transport depended upon the terrain. For example, camels and donkeys were better suited to the highlands, which carts could not negotiate, while oxen were able to progress better through wet lowland areas. Their prowess in negotiating thick forests was particularly prized. They often travelled in groups for protection, this tanda (Note: A tanda refers to a caravan of bullocks but was also used to describe a Banjara encampment.) being led by an elected headman, variously described as a muqaddam, nayak, or naik. Such tandas usually comprised carriage of one specific product and thus were essentially a combined trade operation. They could be huge assemblies, some being recorded as comprising 190,000 beasts, and they also serviced the needs of armies, whose movements naturally followed the same trade and caravan routes. The Duke of Wellington used them for that purpose in his campaign against the Maratha Confederacy around the late 1790s, and Jahangir, a Mughal emperor who reigned in the early seventeenth century, described them as

a fixed class of people, who possess a thousand oxen, or more or less, varying in numbers. They bring grain from the villages to the towns and also accompany armies. With an army, there may at least be a hundred thousand oxen, or more.

Some Banjara subgroups engaged in trading specific goods, but most traded anything that might make them money—the range was vast, encompassing plains produce such as oilseed, sugarcane, opium, fruits and flowers, forest products (for example, gums, chironji, mahua, berries, honey), and items from the hills, including tobacco and grass. Some traded in specific goods, such as the Labana (salt), Multani (grain), and Mukeri (wood and timber). One common Banjara practice in Berar before the British colonial period was the movement of cotton out of the region and then a return journey with produce, salt, spices, and similar consumptibles into the region. In that area, the Deccan Plateau and the Central Provinces, the Banjaras had a monopoly on the movement of salt prior to the arrival of the East India Company. More generally, they also traded in cattle, moving the beasts around the country's bazaars, and they rented out their carts. Although some older sources have suggested that they did not use credit, Habib's analysis of historic sources suggests that they did and that some were reliant on it.

The peripatetic nature of Banjara life significantly affected their societal behaviours. Satya states that it

generated tremendous diversity within the Banjara society in terms of language, customs, beliefs and practices. It developed in them a rather casual, unorthodox, and open attitude towards religion, family, and women. Many of the practices which were prohibited in the mainstream orthodox Hindu society were freely practised in the Banjara community.

The movement of goods around the country meant that the Banjaras had to be, and were, trusted by merchants, moneylenders, and traders. Any disruption caused by the grazing of their livestock along the trade routes was tolerated, because the same beasts provided manure to fertilise the land. However, many Europeans historically thought the Banjaras to be similar to Gypsies, although this was unjustified, as there were significant differences. Habib writes that "Superstitions of all kinds, including suspected witch killings and sacrifices, reinforced the Gypsy image of the class".

In the 19th century, and despite some British officials such as Thurston praising their trustworthiness as carriers, the British colonial authorities brought the community under the purview of the Criminal Tribes Act of 1871. Edward Balfour wrote in his On the migratory tribes of natives in Central India (1843) that the reduction in the number of wars by that time had contributed to their economic deprivation, while East India Company encroachment on monopolies such as salt also affected them. Many also lost their work as carriers due to the arrival of the railways and improved roads. Some tried to work the forests for wood and produce, some settled as farmers, and others turned to crime. Earlier than this, there had been British people who considered them to be undesirable because of their role in passing messages and weapons to armies as they went about their travels, and there was also a general trend among the British to treat criminality as something that was normal among communities without fixed abode. (Note: The association of wandering groups with criminality was neither a colonial notion nor necessarily one that first arose during the British era in India. The British treated vagrants as criminals in their own country.) They were sometimes associated by the British with the Thugee and by the 1830s had gained some notoriety for committing crimes such as roadside robbery, cattle lifting, and theft of grain or other property. The women took a leading role in such criminality, led by the headman of the gang, and if someone was convicted, then the other members of the gang would take care of their families. Poor, mostly illiterate and unskilled, the Banjaras were also resistant to improvement through education, which the British felt left no recourse other than tight control through policing. Their reputation for misdeeds persisted into the early twentieth century.

The status of the Banjaras as a designated criminal tribe continued until after the independence of India, when the repeal of the Criminal Tribes Act caused them to be classified as one of the Denotified Tribes.

== Language ==
The Banjaras speak a language called Lambadi, or Gour Boli. As it has no script, it is either written in Devanagari or in the script of the local language, such as Telugu or Kannada. Many Banjaras today are bilingual or multilingual, adopting the predominant language of their surroundings, but those that continue to live in areas of dense Banjara population continue to use their traditional idioms.

There have been calls for the traditional language to be recognised in the Constitution of India; the state of Telangana has introduced two textbooks in Lambadi for primary school children.

== Art ==
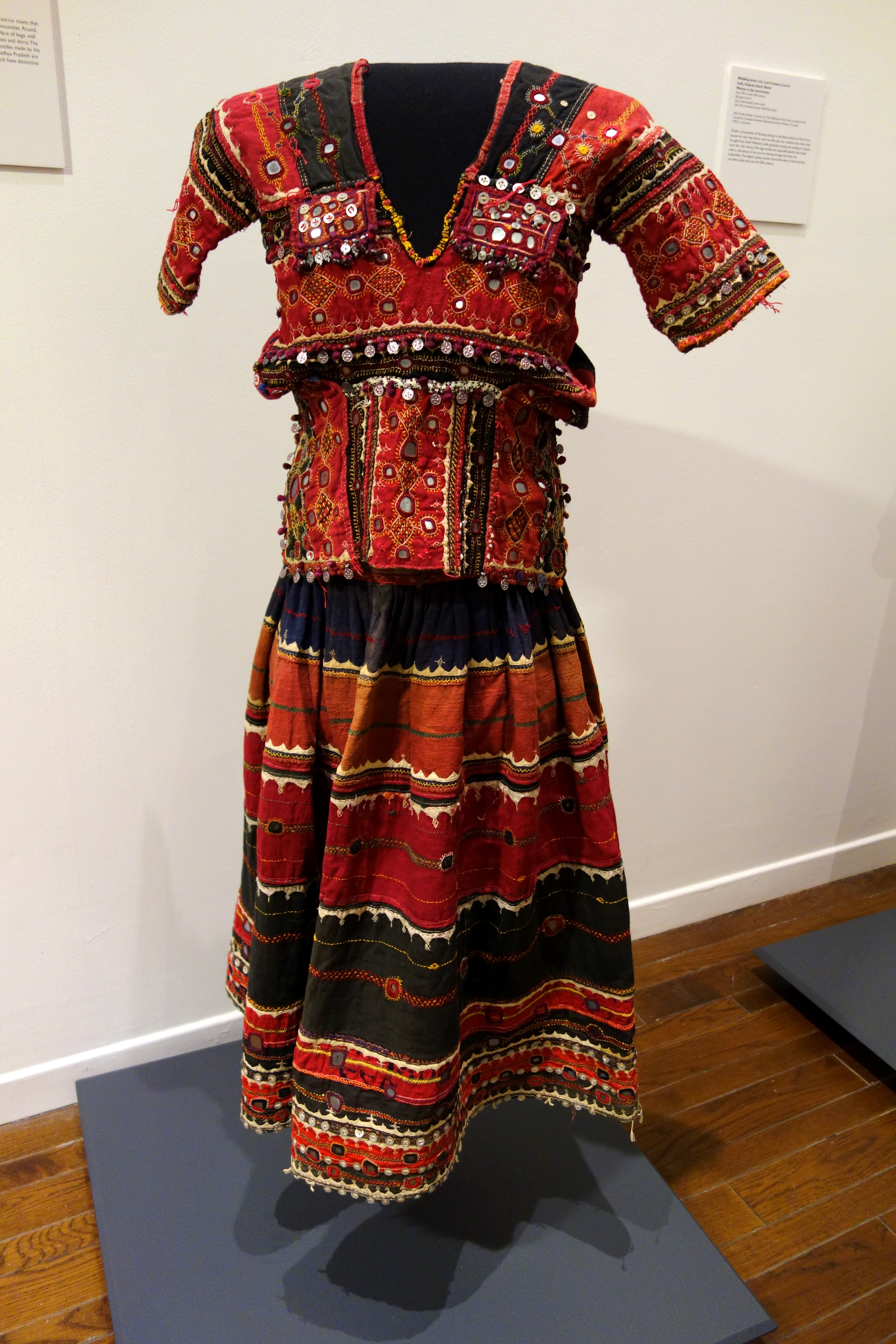
Traditional Banjara dress consisting of kanchali (blouse) and phetiya (skirt)

Banjara art includes performance arts, such as dance and music, as well as folk and plastic arts, such as rangoli, textile embroidery, tattooing, and painting. Banjara embroidery and tattooing are especially prized and also form a significant aspect of the Banjara identity. Lambani women specialise in lepo embroidery, which involves stitching pieces of mirror, decorative beads, and coins onto clothes. Sandur Lambani embroidery is a type of textile embroidery unique to the tribe in Sanduru, Bellary district, Karnataka. It has obtained a GI tag.

=== Festivals ===
Banjaras celebrate a festival called Sheetala Bhavani, usually during the month of June or July, during which they pray for the protection of their cattle. During the month of August, they celebrate Gangaur, Gamoli, or Sinjara, a special ritual found only in the Marwar region, in which young, unmarried girls pray for a good groom. They sow seeds in bamboo bowls and water it three times a day for nine days, and if the sprouts grow "thick and high", it is considered a good omen. During Teej, girls sing and dance around the seedling baskets. Other important celebrations for the Banjara are Diwali, the festival of lights, and Holi, a spring festival of colours. Banjara people worship the goddess Bhavani during Vijayadashami, followed by Ayudha Puja.

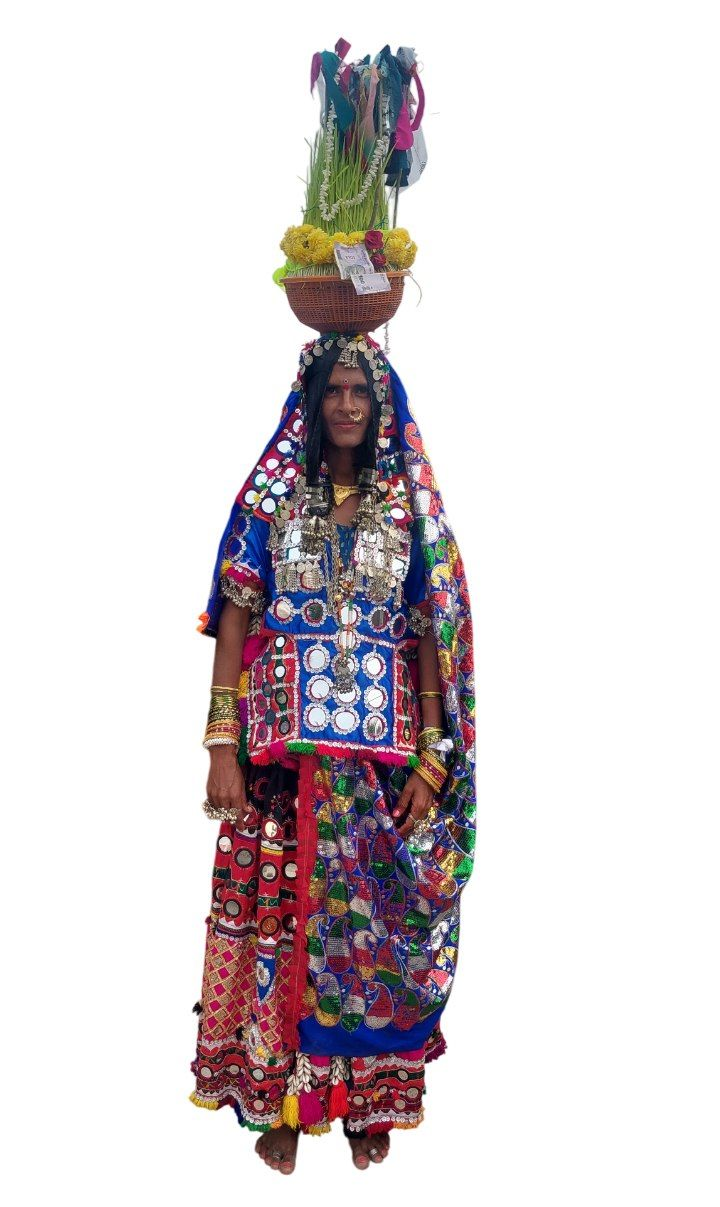
A Banjara woman standing with a teej on her head during the Dussehra festival

=== Dance and music ===
Ghoomar and Chari are traditional dance forms of the Banjaras. They have a sister community of singers, known as Dadhis, or Gajugonia, who traditionally travelled from village to village, singing songs to the accompaniment of sarangi.

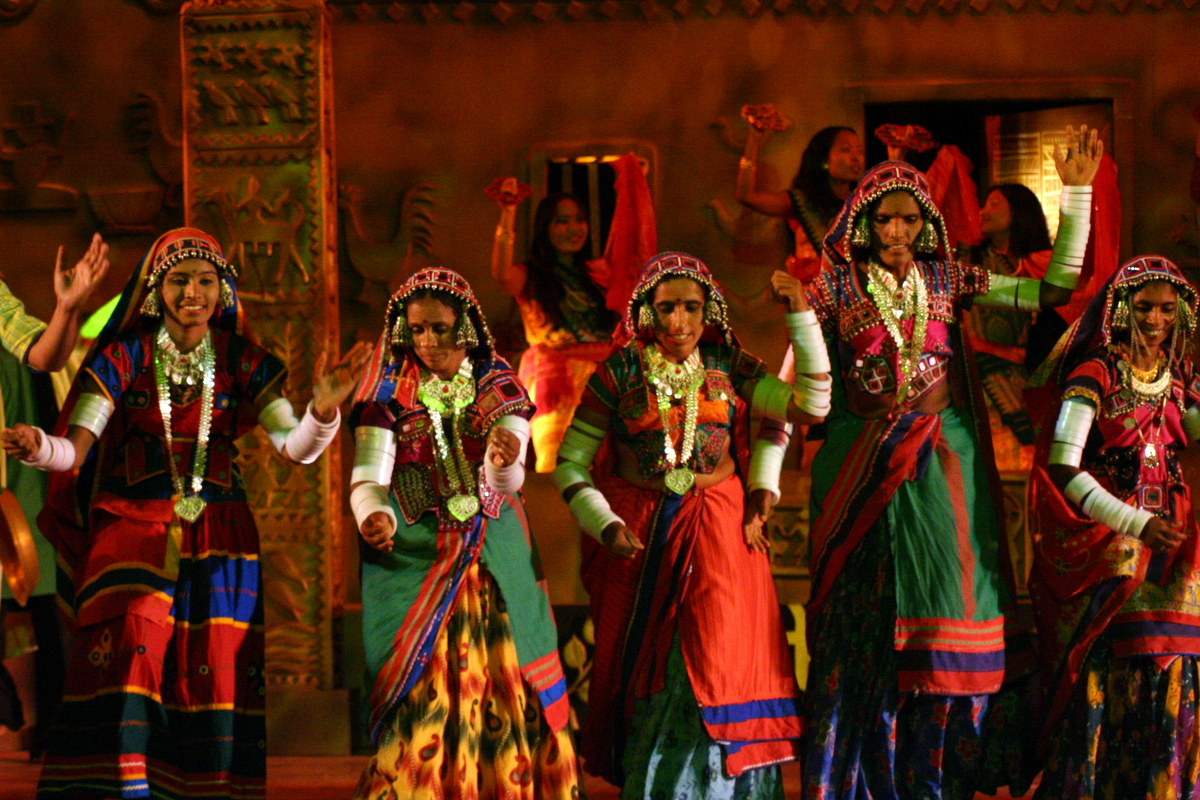
Lambadi dance

== Religion ==
Banjara people are known to worship deities such as Balaji and Jagadamba. They also hold Guru Nanak in great respect.

Sevalal, or Sevabhaya, is the most important saint of the Banjaras. Colonial British administrators quote his stories, place him in the 19th century, and identify his original name as Siva Rathor.

== Society ==
Although the Banjaras were traditionally a migratory people, each year, they historically settled in fixed-village accommodations during the monsoon months of June—August. Although the introduction of modern modes of transport largely made the community redundant from their traditional occupation, forcing them into economic distress from which they sought relief by turning to agriculture and other unskilled labour, according to V. Sarveswara Naik, as recently as 1996, many still retained a nomadic lifestyle on a seasonal basis to supplement their income. They also retained common traits among their exogamous clans, including strict tribal endogamy, use of the Gor-Boli language, referencing themselves as Gor, settling in tanda groups, using tribal councils called gor panchayats to resolve disputes and, in the case of women, dressing in traditional clothing. However, the men have largely given up their traditional attire of a white dhoti (skirt) and a red turban, along with the wearing of earrings, finger rings, and kanadoro (silver strings worn around the waist).

=== Marriage ===
Aside from retaining their practice of endogamy, Naik records of Banjara customs in 1990s Andhra Pradesh that they follow forms of marriage that include monogamy. Widows are allowed to remarry, and divorce is accepted, provided it has the consent of the gor panchayat. Marriages are usually between people who live fairly close together, within the same taluka, or, occasionally, district. The exception to this is the relatively rare occasion when the man has some education, in which case it is becoming more common to see them making arrangements that involve a longer distance.

It is the boys' fathers who initiate marriage proposals, usually when the child reaches the age of 18 and is considered capable of running an independent household. Women and girls, including the prospective bride, have no say in the matter, but the father takes advice from the naik of his tanda and from close relatives. The girls are usually prepared for this arranged marriage from the onset of puberty, and their parents will make a show of resistance when a proposal is made, before her father agrees to the advice given by his naik and village elders. Horoscopes are consulted and information gleaned regarding the boy's prospects. Sometimes, the arrangement is made earlier and may even be solemnised with a betrothal ceremony, called a sagai, but the girl will remain in the household until she attains puberty. When agreement is reached and both sides make a promise to that effect in front of the gor panchayat, the boy's family distributes liquor, betel leaves, and nuts for the tanda and the girl's family. She is presented with a full set of traditional dress upon marriage, which is made by her mother. Women's dress varies according to marital status, as does their ornamentation. Although the ornamentation was once made of ivory and silver, reduced economic circumstances have caused it to be made of plastic and aluminium. The extremely elaborate nature of their dresses, comprising glass pieces, beads, and seashells on a mainly red material, means that they are worn for months between careful launderings.

The practice of paying a bride price to the girl's father traditionally applies on betrothal, which is a community celebration, although the payment of a dowry by the bride's family is becoming evident. The value of this transaction is set by the gor panchayat and is now a monetary figure. It was traditionally eleven rupees and either four bullocks or one bullock and three cattle, unless the groom's family was particularly wealthy. The marriage is usually arranged for a time when there is little work, so the months of April and May are common, as they fall just after the harvest period.

=== Gender roles ===
Banjara families prefer to have both sons and daughters. The son is considered necessary, because they are a patrilineal society, while at least one daughter is deemed desirable, because she can look after the parents in their old age if the son is too preoccupied in his marriage. Daughters also contribute greatly to the running of the family unit prior to their own marriage and are prized by their mothers for that reason, being trained in various domestic tasks that benefit both the unit and their future married life. Aside from strictly domestic tasks, they are an economic boon, because they help with herding and grazing the family's cattle and with work in the crop fields.

A Banjara wife is subservient to her husband and is expected to perform daily tasks for her parents-in-law. While she and her husband live with her parents-in-law, she is also subservient to her mother-in-law. This period of co-habitation with the extended family usually lasts until the husband has helped to arrange the marriages of his brothers. Once the husband is free of his obligation to his brothers, his wife will apply pressure to achieve a separation from the joint household, which grants her a measure of independence, although she remains economically reliant upon her husband. The separating of the households leads to the husband receiving some property from his parents, such as land, livestock, and money, but as it is a patrilineal society, the wife has nothing.

Banjara men take the lead in religious festivals, with women playing a subsidiary role. The men sing the devotional songs and perform the temple rituals, but it is the women who do most of the singing and dancing. Women are also expected to work with men when groups enact performances in front of non-Banjara audiences to raise money for the celebration of festivals, but most of that money is then consumed by the men in the form of liquor. The one religious function in which the women are paramount is the preparations for marriage, a ceremony that usually takes place in the house of the bride's family.

It is the men who also perform political functions, settling disputes, and dealing with other problems through the gor panchayat. Any matter that involves a woman is dealt with by the men, and it is a man who represents her interests, an example being the dealings for marriage proposals, which always require the consent of the gor panchayat. If a woman leaves her husband and the marital abode, then that, too, is a matter to be judged by the men.

V. Sarveswara Naik, herself a Banjara, wrote in 1983 that for Banjara women in Andhra Pradesh,

Her activities are restricted within the family and community. She should not refer to her husband by name but with a respectful word Gharwalo who leads the family. Her speech is low and submissive in front of their men in the community. Women consider the men as wise because they have the ability to learn many things. It is the responsibility of men to learn many skills. The women have to follow the path as directed by their men.

=== Distribution ===
As of 2008, the Banjara community has been listed as a Scheduled Tribe in the states of Andhra Pradesh, Bihar, Jharkhand, Telangana, and Odisha. They were designated as an Other Backward Class in Chhattisgarh, Gujarat, Haryana, Madhya Pradesh, Maharashtra, and Rajasthan, and as a Scheduled Caste in Karnataka, Himachal Pradesh, Delhi, and Punjab.

== See also ==
- Banjara literature
- List of Scheduled Tribes in India
