= Scheduled castes in Karnataka =

Schedule Castes population in Karnataka is estimated at 10.9 million as per 2011 census of India, accoounting for about 17.15% of total state population. The Government of Karnataka has listed 101 communities and their sub-castes as Schedule Castes in the state. The Scheduled Castes in Karnataka are divided into 3 categories with Group A, B and C, having internal reservations.

== Sub-classification ==
The issue of the sub-classification of the Scheduled Castes in Karnataka was raised in the Karnataka Legislative Assembly from the late 1980s. The matter came into hype again in the 2010s, when the BJP Karnataka politician C. Narayanaswamy who himself was a Dalit raised the issue of internal reservation in Scheduled Castes (SC) community through sub-classification of the communities. There had been conflict of interest between the SC communities regarding subclassification, particularly among the left-side and right-side Dalits communities. The Left-side Dalit includes mainly Madigas and other leatherworker castes, while the Right-side one includes Holeya and Chalavadi who were agriculturalist labourers arguing that Right-side communities were better off than left-side ones.

In 2025, the Government of Karnataka announced for the subclassification of the Scheduled Castes communities in three categories A, B and C on the basis of Right-side, Left-side and Touchable SCs with internal reservation through THE KARNATAKA SCHEDULED CASTES (SUB-CLASSIFICATON) BILL, 2025.

- Group A: Left-side SCs (Madiga and other leatherworker castes)
- Group B: Right-side SCs (Chalavadi and other labourer castes)
- Group C: Touchable SCs (Lambadis and other touchable artisan castes)

Though three communities, namely Adi Andhra, Adi Dravida and Adi Karnataka were listed in both Group A and B.

Scheduled Castes			Reservation (Internal)
Code	Communities	Group	Reservation (Internal)
001	Adi Andhra	Both Group A and B	12% (6 + 6)%
002	Adi Dravida	Both Group A and B	12% (6 + 6)%
003	Adi Karnataka	Both Group A and B	12% (6 + 6)%
022	Bhambi, Bhambhi, Asadaru, Asodi, Chamadia, Chamar, Chambhar, Chamgar, Haralayya, Harali, Khalpa, Machigor, Mochigar Madar, Madig, Mochi, Muchi, Telegu Mochi, Kamati Mochi, Ranigar, Rohidas, Rohit, Samgar	Group A	6%
028	Chandala	Group A	6%
029	Dhor, Kakkayya, Kakkayaa	Group A	6%
040	Halsar, Haslar, Hulasvar, Halasvar	Group A	6%
042	Hasla	Group A	6%
048	Kadaiyan	Group A	6%
050	Kepmaris	Group A	6%
051	Kolupulvandlu	Group A	6%
056	Kudumban	Group A	6%
061	Madiga	Group A	6%
072	Mang, Matang, Minimadig	Group A	6%
076	Mavilan	Group A	6%
088	Panchama	Group A	6%
089	Panniandi	Group A	6%
093	Samagara	Group A	6%
094	Samgan	Group A	6%
007	Anamuk	Group B	6%
008	Aray Mala	Group B	6%
010	Arwa Mala	Group B	6%
015	Balagai	Group B	6%
027	Chalavadi, Chalvadi, Channayya	Group B	6%
086	Pallan	Group B	6%
044	Holaya, Holeya, Holar	Group B	6%
062	Mahar, Dhegumegu	Group B	6%
063	Mahyavanshi, Dhed, Vankar, Maru Vankar	Group B	6%
065	Mala	Group B	6%
067	Mala Hannai	Group B	6%
068	Mala Jangam	Group B	6%
069	Mala Masti	Group B	6%
070	Mala Sale, Netkani	Group B	6%
078	Moger	Group B	6%
080	Mundala	Group B	6%
090	Paraiya, Paraya	Group B	6%
091	Raneyan	Group B	6%
101	Valluvan	Group B	6%
004	Adiya [in Coorg district]	Group C	5%
005	Ager	Group C	5%
006	Ajila	Group C	5%
009	Arunthathiyar	Group C	5%
011	Baira	Group C	5%
012	Bakad	Group C	5%
013	Bant [in Belgaum, Bijapur, Dharwar and North Kanara districts]	Group C	5%
014	Bakuda	Group C	5%
016	Bandi	Group C	5%
017	Banjara, Lambadi, Lamabadi, Lambani, Sugali	Group C	5%
018	Bathada	Group C	5%
019	Beda Jangam, Budga Jangam	Group C	5%
020	Bellara	Group C	5%
021	Bhangi, Mehtar, Olgana, Rukhi, Malkana Halalkhor, Lalbegi, Balmiki, Korar, Zadmalli	Group C	5%
023	Bhovi, Od, Woddar, Voddar, Kalluvadar, Mannuvadar	Group C	5%
024	Bindla	Group C	5%
025	Byagara	Group C	5%
026	Chakkiliyan	Group C	5%
029	Chenna Dasar, Holar Dasar	Group C	5%
030	Dakkal, Dakkalwar	Group C	5%
031	Dakkaliga	Group C	5%
033	Dom, Dombara, Paidi, Pano	Group C	5%
034	Ellamalwar, Yellammalawandlu	Group C	5%
035	Ghanti Chores	Group C	5%
036	Garoda, Garo	Group C	5%
037	Godda	Group C	5%
038	Gosangi	Group C	5%
039	Halleer	Group C	5%
041	Handi Jogis	Group C	5%
043	Holar, Valhar	Group C	5%
045	Holeya Dasari	Group C	5%
046	Jaggali	Group C	5%
047	Jambuvulu	Group C	5%
049	Kalladi	Group C	5%
052	Koosa	Group C	5%
053	Koracha, Korachar	Group C	5%
054	Korama, Korava, Koravar	Group C	5%
055	Kotegar, Metri	Group C	5%
057	Kuruvan	Group C	5%
058	Lingader	Group C	5%
059	Machala	Group C	5%
060	Madari	Group C	5%
064	Maila	Group C	5%
066	Mala Dasari	Group C	5%
071	Mala Sanyasi	Group C	5%
073	Mang Garudi, Mang Garodi	Group C	5%
074	Manne	Group C	5%
075	Masthi	Group C	5%
077	Meghwal, Menghvar	Group C	5%
079	Mukri	Group C	5%
081	Nadia, Hadi	Group C	5%
082	Nalkadaya	Group C	5%
083	Nalakeyya	Group C	5%
084	Nayadi	Group C	5%
085	Pale	Group C	5%
087	Pambada	Group C	5%
091	Paravan	Group C	5%
095	Sapari	Group C	5%
096	Sillekyathas	Group C	5%
097	Sindhollu, Chindollu	Group C	5%
098	Sudugadu Siddha	Group C	5%
099	Thoti	Group C	5%
100	Tirgar, Tirbanda	Group C	5%

== Demographics ==
=== Community-wise ===
Scheduled Castes		Population (2011)	
Code	Community	Total population	%age of total
001	Adi Andhra	26,486	0.253
002	Adi Dravida	7,95,620	7.595
003	Adi Karnataka	29,20,942	27.885
004	Adiya (in Coorg district)	811	0.007
005	Ager	6,642	0.063
006	Ajila	2,448	0.023
007	Anamuk	75	<0.001
008	Aray Mala	94	<0.001
009	Arunthathiyar	2,385	0.023
010	Arwa Mala	260	0.002
011	Baira	4,049	0.039
012	Bakad	808	0.007
013	Bant (in Belagavi, Bijapur, Dharwad and Uttara Kannada districts)	1,390	0.013
014	Bakuda	1,566	0.015
015	Balagai	2,180	0.020
016	Bandi	678	0.006
017	Banjara, Lambadi, Lamadi, Sulagi, Sulagavi	12,67,036	12.095
018	Bathada	2,632	0.025
019	Beda Jangam, Budga Jangam	1,17,164	1.118
020	Bellara	1,243	0.012
021	Bhangi, Mehtar, Olgana, Rukhi, Halalkhor, Lal Begi, Balmiki, Korar, Zadmalli	5,281	0.052
022	Bhambi, Bhambhi, Asadaru, Asodi, Chamadia, Chamar, Chambhar, Chamgar, Haralayya, Hallar, Khalpa, Madig, Madar Mochigar, Mochi, Muchi, Telugu Mochi, Kamati Mochi, Ravidas, Rohidas, Rohit, Samgar	6,05,486	5.780
023	Bhovi, Od, Voddar, Woddar, Kalluvaddar, Mannuvaddar	11,19,315	10.685
024	Bindla	149	0.001
025	Byagara	2,019	0.019
026	Chakkiliyan	574	0.005
027	Chalavadi, Chalvadi, Chanayya	2,19,626	2.097
028	Chandala	142	0.001
029	Chenna Dassar, Holaya Dassar	72,003	0.687
030	Dakkal, Dokkalwar	530	0.005
031	Dakkaliga	763	0.007
032	Dhor, Kakkayya, Kankayya	29,199	0.279
033	Dombar, Dom, Paidi, Pano	26,344	0.251
034	Ellamalwar, Yellammalawandlu	108	0.001
035	Ghanti Chores	4,967	0.047
036	Garoda, Garo	170	0.001
037	Godda	1,532	0.015
038	Gosangi	2,219	0.021
039	Halleer	3,533	0.035
040	Halsar, Haslar, Hulasvar, Halasvar	9,695	0.092
041	Handi Jogis	22,675	0.216
042	Hasla	924	0.009
043	Holar, Valhar	1,548	0.015
044	Holeya, Holar, Holaya	7,92,785	7.568
045	Holeya Dasari	382	0.003
046	Jaggali	1,061	0.010
047	Jambuvulu	12,411	0.118
048	Kadaiyan	45	<0.001
049	Kalladi	1,774	0.017
050	Kepmaris	19	<0.001
051	Kolupulvandlu	1	<0.001
052	Koosa	202	0.002
053	Koracha, Korachar	55,148	0.526
054	Korama, Korava, Koravar	2,09,568	2.001
055	Kotegar, Metri	2,370	0.023
056	Kudumban	80	<0.001
057	Kuruvan	637	0.006
058	Lingader	76	<0.001
059	Machala	244	0.002
060	Madari	1,060	0.010
061	Madiga	9,53,918	9.106
062	Mahar, Taral, Dhegumegu	66,068	0.631
063	Mahyavanshi, Dhed, Vankar, Maru Vankar	63	<0.001
064	Maila	1,824	0.018
065	Mala	20,105	0.192
066	Mala Dasari	4,391	0.042
067	Mala Hannai	17	<0.001
068	Mala Jangam	28	<0.001
069	Mala Masti	5	<0.001
070	Mala Salle, Netkani	267	0.002
071	Mala Sanyasi	552	0.005
072	Mang, Matang, Minimadig	26,218	0.250
073	Mang Garodi, Mang Garudi	3,434	0.033
074	Manne	99	<0.001
075	Masthi	100	<0.001
076	Mavilan	42	<0.001
077	Meghval, Menghvar	2,057	0.019
078	Moger	82,807	0.791
079	Mukri	11,501	0.109
080	Mandala	27,417	0.262
081	Nadia, Hadi	1,378	0.013
082	Nalakadya	765	0.007
083	Nalakeyeva	5,942	0.057
084	Nayadi	589	0.005
085	Pale	9,374	0.089
086	Pallan	3,592	0.035
087	Pambada	711	0.006
088	Panchama	450	0.004
089	Panniandi	11	<0.001
090	Paraiyan, Paraya	2,418	0.023
091	Paravan	3,528	0.035
092	Raneyan	3,578	0.035
093	Samagara	88,215	0.842
094	Samban	102	0.001
095	Sapari	49	<0.001
096	Sillekyathas	35,197	0.342
097	Sindhollu, Chindollu	1,706	0.016
098	Sudugadu Siddha	29,457	0.281
099	Thoti	1,304	0.013
100	Tirgar, Tirbanda	81	<0.001
101	Valluvan	1,115	0.011
Generic castes, etc		7,23,697	6.909
		1,04,74,992	100.000

=== Religion-wise ===
Scheduled Castes		Population (2011)	Religions		
Scheduled Castes		Population (2011)	Hinduism	Sikhism	Buddhism
001	Adi Andhra	26,486	26,448	5	33
002	Adi Dravida	7,95,620	7,95,181	152	287
003	Adi Karnataka	29,20,942	29,18,159	434	2,349
004	Adiya (in Coorg district)	811	810	1	0
005	Ager	6,642	6,642	0	0
006	Ajila	2,448	2,448	0	0
007	Anamuk	75	75	0	0
008	Aray Mala	94	93	1	0
009	Arunthathiyar	2,385	2,383	0	2
010	Arwa Mala	260	260	0	0
011	Baira	4,049	4,048	0	1
012	Bakad	808	808	0	0
013	Bant (in Belagavi, Bijapur, Dharwad and Uttara Kannada districts)	1,390	1,388	2	0
014	Bakuda	1,566	1,566	0	0
015	Balagai	2,180	2,172	0	8
016	Bandi	678	678	0	0
017	Banjara, Lambadi, Lamadi, Sulagi, Sulagavi	12,67,036	12,66,783	182	71
018	Bathada	2,632	2,632	0	0
019	Beda Jangam, Budga Jangam	1,17,164	1,17,138	16	10
020	Bellara	1,243	1,243	0	0
021	Bhangi, Mehtar, Olgana, Rukhi, Halalkhor, Lal Begi, Balmiki, Korar, Zadmalli	5,281	5,259	20	2
022	Bhambi, Bhambhi, Asadaru, Asodi, Chamadia, Chamar, Chambhar, Chamgar, Haralayya, Hallar, Khalpa, Madig, Madar Mochigar, Mochi, Muchi, Telugu Mochi, Kamati Mochi, Ravidas, Rohidas, Rohit, Samgar	6,05,486	6,05,104	83	299
023	Bhovi, Od, Voddar, Woddar, Kalluvaddar, Mannuvaddar	11,19,315	11,18,953	143	219
024	Bindla	149	149	0	0
025	Byagara	2,019	2,019	0	0
026	Chakkiliyan	574	574	0	0
027	Chalavadi, Chalvadi, Chanayya	2,19,626	2,17,420	13	1,081
028	Chandala	142	142	0	0
029	Chenna Dassar, Holaya Dassar	72,003	71,973	8	20
030	Dakkal, Dokkalwar	530	530	0	0
031	Dakkaliga	763	762	0	1
032	Dhor, Kakkayya, Kankayya	29,199	29,176	2	21
033	Dombar, Dom, Paidi, Pano	26,344	26,340	3	1
034	Ellamalwar, Yellammalawandlu	108	108	0	0
035	Ghanti Chores	4,967	4,967	0	0
036	Garoda, Garo	170	166	0	4
037	Godda	1,532	1,527	0	5
038	Gosangi	2,219	2,218	1	0
039	Halleer	3,533	3,533	0	0
040	Halsar, Haslar, Hulasvar, Halasvar	9,695	9,694	0	1
041	Handi Jogis	22,675	22,671	3	1
042	Hasla	924	924	0	0
043	Holar, Valhar	1,548	1,534	0	14
044	Holeya, Holar, Holaya	7,92,785	7,55,266	161	37,358
045	Holeya Dasari	382	382	0	0
046	Jaggali	1,061	1,061	0	0
047	Jambuvulu	12,411	12,407	2	2
048	Kadaiyan	45	45	0	0
049	Kalladi	1,774	1,774	0	0
050	Kepmaris	19	19	0	0
051	Kolupulvandlu	1	1	0	0
052	Koosa	202	202	0	0
053	Koracha, Korachar	55,148	55,133	10	5
054	Korama, Korava, Koravar	2,09,568	2,09,524	27	17
055	Kotegar, Metri	2,370	2,370	0	0
056	Kudumban	80	80	0	0
057	Kuruvan	637	637	0	0
058	Lingader	76	76	0	0
059	Machala	244	244	0	0
060	Madari	1,060	1,060	0	0
061	Madiga	9,53,918	9,52,717	200	996
062	Mahar, Taral, Dhegumegu	66,068	60,348	19	5,701
063	Mahyavanshi, Dhed, Vankar, Maru Vankar	63	61	0	2
064	Maila	1,824	1,824	0	0
065	Mala	20,105	20,050	13	42
066	Mala Dasari	4,391	4,390	1	0
067	Mala Hannai	17	17	0	0
068	Mala Jangam	28	28	0	0
069	Mala Masti	5	5	0	0
070	Mala Salle, Netkani	267	267	0	0
071	Mala Sanyasi	552	552	0	0
072	Mang, Matang, Minimadig	26,218	26,108	5	105
073	Mang Garodi, Mang Garudi	3,434	3,434	0	0
074	Manne	99	99	0	0
075	Masthi	100	100	0	0
076	Mavilan	42	42	0	0
077	Meghval, Menghvar	2,057	2,056	0	1
078	Moger	82,807	82,760	3	44
079	Mukri	11,501	11,501	0	0
080	Mandala	27,417	27,403	1	13
081	Nadia, Hadi	1,378	1,378	0	1
082	Nalakadya	765	765	0	0
083	Nalakeyeva	5,942	5,942	0	0
084	Nayadi	589	589	0	0
085	Pale	9,374	9,374	2	0
086	Pallan	3,592	3,591	0	1
087	Pambada	711	711	0	0
088	Panchama	450	450	0	0
089	Panniandi	11	11	0	0
090	Paraiyan, Paraya	2,418	2,418	0	0
091	Paravan	3,528	3,528	0	0
092	Raneyan	3,578	3,578	0	0
093	Samagara	88,215	88,165	24	26
094	Samban	102	102	0	0
095	Sapari	49	49	0	0
096	Sillekyathas	35,197	35,190	6	1
097	Sindhollu, Chindollu	1,706	1,706	0	0
098	Sudugadu Siddha	29,457	29,449	8	0
099	Thoti	1,304	1,304	0	0
100	Tirgar, Tirbanda	81	81	0	0
101	Valluvan	1,115	1,115	0	0
Generic castes, etc		7,23,697	7,19,102	531	4,064
		1,04,74,992	1,04,18,989	2,100	53,903

=== District wise ===
District		Scheduled Castes		
Name	Population (As of 2011)	Population	Percent	Top 3 largest (by population)
Bagalkote	1,889,752	319,139	16.89	Bhambi, Chambhar (109,435); Lambadi (49,699); Holeya (43,667)
Bengaluru Urban	9,621,551	1,198,385	12.45	Adi Karnataka (449,146); Adi Dravida (300,739); Bhovi (117,655)
Bengaluru North	990,923	213,700	21.56	Adi Karnataka (124,287); Adi Dravida (27,299); Bhovi (24,228)
Bengaluru South	1,082,636	203,819	18.83	Adi Karnataka (124,103); Bhovi (27,046); Lambadi (16,542)
Belagavi	4,779,661	577,418	12.08	Holeya (150,438); Bhambi, Chambhar (139,731); Mahar (43,448)
Ballari	2,754,598	517,409	18.78	Adi Karnataka (116,331); Lambadi (91,135); Madiga (90,091)
Bidar	1,703,300	399,785	23.47	Holeya (142,898); Madiga (90,524); Lambadi (64,275)
Bijapur	2,177,331	442,773	20.33	Lambadi (155,838); Holeya (110,254); Bhambi, Chambhar (75,604)
Chamarajanagara	1,020,791	259,445	25.42	Adi Karnataka (195,489); Madiga (18,746); Bhovi (7,474)
Chikkaballapura	1,255,104	312,565	24.90	Adi Karnataka (164,179); Bhovi (52,822); Adi Dravida (37,649)
Chikmagalur	1,137,961	253,651	22.29	Adi Karnataka (124,780); Lambadi (36,451); Bhovi (29,383)
Chitradurga	1,659,456	389,117	23.45	Adi Karnataka (167,655); Bhovi (74,301); Lambadi (50,805)
Dakshina Kannada	2,089,649	148,178	7.09	Moger (44,761); Adi Dravida (32,725); Mundala (14,737)
Davanagere	1,643,494	392,595	23.89	Lambadi (104,583); Adi Karnataka (91,184); Bhovi (64,081)
Dhārawaḍa	1,847,023	177,855	9.63	Bhambi, Chambhar (54,903); Bhovi (23,807); Chalavadi (23,727)
Gadag	1,064,570	174,196	16.36	Bhambi, Chambhar (52,456); Lambadi (50,702); Bhovi (21,526)
Kalaburagi	2,566,326	648,782	25.28	Holeya (222,368); Lambadi (183,612); Madiga (94,375)
Hassan	1,776,421	345,031	19.42	Adi Karnataka (215,867); Bhovi (28,467); Adi Dravida (24,165)
Haveri	1,597,668	219,976	13.77	Bhambi, Chambhar (66,401); Lambadi (55,937); Bhovi (34,806)
Kodagu	554,519	73,584	13.27	Adi Karnataka (40,209); Pale (8,130); Moger (7,347)
Kolāra	1,536,401	465,867	30.32	Adi Karnataka (208,000); Adi Dravida (126,811); Bhovi (82,035)
Koppal	1,389,920	258,608	18.61	Madiga (79,704); Lambadi (41,568); Bhambi, Chambhar (31,209)
Mandya	1,805,769	265,294	14.69	Adi Karnataka (178,563); Bhovi (18,192); Madiga (14,648)
Mysuru	3,001,127	536,643	17.88	Adi Karnataka (370,144); Madiga (50,813); Bhovi (28,578)
Raichur	1,928,812	400,933	20.79	Madiga (160,206); Lambadi (55,851); Chalavadi (44,062)
Shivamogga	1,752,753	308,158	17.58	Adi Karnataka (88,872); Bhovi (83,864); Lambadi (64,694)
Tumakuru	2,678,980	506,901	18.92	Adi Karnataka (255,788); Bhovi (70,908); Adi Dravida (69,535)
Udupi	1,177,361	74,429	6.32	Adi Dravida (39,698); Moger (6,687); Mundala (5,120)
Uttara Kannada	1,437,169	116,431	8.10	Bhovi (17,869); Moger (16,192); Chalavadi (12,841)
Yadgiri	1,174,271	273,315	23.27	Madiga (81,227); Lambadi (80,900); Holeya (58,821)
