= List of Scheduled Castes in Maharashtra =

This article contains the list of Scheduled Castes in Maharashtra with their population, as per 2011 Census of India. There are 59 communities and their sub-groups recognized as Scheduled Castes in Maharashtra.

== List ==
1. Ager
2. Anamuk
3. Aray Mala
4. Arwa Mala
5. Bahna, Bahana
6. Bakad, Bant
7. Balahi, Balai
8. Basor, Burud, Bansor, Bansodi, Basod
9. Beda Jangam, Budga Jangam
10. Bedar
11. Bhambi, Bhambhi, Asadaru, Asodi, Chamadia, Chamar, Chamari, Chambhar, Chamgar, Haralayya, Harali, Khalpa, Machigar, Mochigar, Madar, Madig, Mochi, Telegu Mochi, Kamati Mochi, Ranigar, Rohidas, Nona, Ramnami, Rohit, Samgar, Samagara, Satnami, Surjyabanshi, Surjyaramnami, Charmakar, Pardeshi Chamar
12. Bhangi, Mehtar, Olgana, Rukhi, Malkana, Halalkhor, Lalbegi, Balmiki, Korar, Zadmalli, Hela
13. Bindla
14. Byagara
15. Chalvadi, Channayya
16. Chenna Dasar, Holaya Dasar, Holeya Dasari
17. Dakkal, Dokkalwar
18. Dhor, Kakkayya, Kankayya, Dohor
19. Dom, Dumar
20. Ellamalvar, Yellammalawandlu
21. Ganda, Gandi
22. Garoda, Garo
23. Ghasi, Ghasia
24. Halleer
25. Halsar, Haslar, Hulasvar, Halasvar
26. Holar, Valhar
27. Holaya, Holer, Holeya, Holiya
28. Kaikadi (in Akola, Amravati, Bhandara, Buldana, Nagpur, Wardha and Yavatmal districts and Chandrapur district, other than Rajura tahsil)a
29. Katia, Patharia
30. Khangar, Kanera, Mirdha
31. Khatik, Chikwa, Chikvi
32. Kolupulvandlu
33. Kori
34. Lingader
35. Madgi
36. Madiga
37. Mahar, Mehra, Taral, Dhegu Megu
38. Mahyavanshi, Dhed, Vankar, Maru Vankar
39. Mala
40. Mala Dasari
41. Mala Hannai
42. Mala Jangam
43. Mala Masti
44. Mala Sale, Netkani
45. Mala Sanyasi
46. Mang Garodi, Mang Garudi
47. Mang, Matang, Minimadig, Dankhni Mang, Mang Mahashi, Madari, Garudi, Radhe Mang
48. Manne
49. Mashti
50. Meghval, Menghvar
51. Mitha Ayyalvar
52. Mukri
53. Nadia, Hadi
54. Pasi
55. Sansi
56. Shenva, Chenva, Sedma, Ravat
57. Sindhollu, Chindollu
58. Tirgar, Tirbanda
59. Turi

== Demographics ==
=== Community wise ===
Scheduled Castes		Population (2011)	
Code	Communities	Total	%age of total
001	Ager	896	0.007
002	Anamuk	68	<0.001
003	Aray Mala	350	0.003
004	Arwa Mala	503	0.004
005	Bahna, Bahana	210	0.002
006	Bakad, Bant	1,649	0.013
007	Balahi, Balai	16,957	0.128
008	Basor, Bansod, Bansode, Bansor	55,564	0.418
009	Beda Jangam, Budga Jangam	27,168	0.205
010	Bedar	14,029	0.106
011	Bhambi, Chamar, Chambhar, Khalpa,Rohit, Rohidas, Ramnami, Satnami, etc.	14,11,072	10.629
012	Bhangi, Mehtar, Olgana, Rukhi, Halalkhor, Lalbegi, Balmiki, Zadmali, Hela	2,17,166	1.636
013	Bindla	625	0.005
014	Byagara	379	0.003
015	Chalavadi, Channayya	3,309	0.029
016	Chenna Dasar, Holeya Dasar, Holaya Dasari	608	0.005
017	Dakkal, Dokkalwar	950	0.007
018	Dhor, Kankayya	1,16,287	0.876
019	Dom, Domar	3,690	0.028
020	Ellamalwar, Yellammalawandhlu	3,306	0.025
021	Ganda, Gandi	585	0.004
022	Garoda, Garodi	601	0.005
023	Ghasi, Ghasiya	1,989	0.015
024	Halleer	102	0.001
025	Halsar, Haslar, Halasvar	148	0.001
026	Holar, Valhar	1,08,908	0.820
027	Holaya, Holeya, Holiya	18,263	0.137
028	Kaikadi	5,599	0.042
029	Katia, Patariya	5,207	0.039
030	Khangar, Kanera, Mirdha	2,020	0.015
031	Khatik, Chikwa	1,08,491	0.817
032	Kolupulvandhlu	33	<0.001
033	Kori	16,018	0.121
034	Lingader	5,298	0.041
035	Madgi	56,481	0.425
036	Madiga	15,318	0.115
037	Mahar, Mehra, Dhegu Megu	80,60,060	60.712
038	Mahyavanshi, Dhedh, Vankar	14,039	0.105
039	Mala	15,266	0.115
040	Mala Dasari	1,789	0.013
041	Mala Hannai	27	<0.001
042	Mala Jangam	8,491	0.064
043	Mala Masti	17	<0.001
044	Mala Sale, Netkani	269	0.002
045	Mala Sanyasi	46	<0.001
046	Mang, Matang, Madari, etc.	24,88,531	18.745
047	Mang Garodi, Mang Garudi	39,993	0.301
048	Manne	2,542	0.019
049	Mashti	69	<0.001
050	Meghwal, Menghvar	40,416	0.304
051	Mitha Ayalval	38	<0.001
052	Mukri	54	<0.001
053	Nadia, Hadi	333	0.003
054	Pasi	24,664	0.185
055	Sansi	491	0.003
056	Shenva, Chenva, Rawat	1,326	0.009
057	Sindhollu, Chindhollu	1,002	0.007
058	Tirgar, Tirbanda	80	<0.001
059	Turi	490	0.003
Generic castes, etc (those who identified as Harijan, Dalit, Anusuchit Jati and others)		4,09,118	2.669
		13,275,898	100%

=== District wise ===
District		Scheduled Caste population		
Name	Total Population (2011)	Population	Percent	Top 3 (by pop)
Ahmednagar	45,43,159	5,73,698	12.63	Mahar (324,776); Matang (152,803); Chambhar (67,929)
Akola	18,13,906	3,64,059	20.07	Mahar (282,602); Matang (43,641); Chambhar (22,125)
Amravati	28,88,445	5,06,374	17.53	Mahar (377,616); Matang (52,923); Chambhar (22,430)
Aurangabad	37,01,282	5,39,368	14.57	Mahar (370,474); Matang (104,692); Chambhar (48,110)
Beed	25,85,049	2,51,254	9.72	Mahar (195,823); Matang (112,825); Chambhar (29,856)
Bhandara	12,00,334	2,00,372	16.69	Mahar (175,547); Chambhar (11,503); Matang (2,858)
Buldhana	25,86,258	4,70,895	18.21	Mahar (330,166); Matang (78,021); Chambhar (47,510)
Chandrapur	22,04,307	3,48,365	15.80	Mahar (266,760); Madgi (26,484); Chambhar (19,959)
Dhule	20,50,862	1,27,571	6.22	Mahar (87,429); Chambhar (18,406); Matang (8,689)
Gadchiroli	10,72,942	1,20,745	11.25	Mahar (98,805); Madgi (12,183); Chambhar (2,469)
Gondia	13,22,507	1,75,961	13.30	Mahar (147,085); Chambhar (14,473); Holeya (3,241)
Hingoli	11,77,345	1,82,565	15.51	Mahar (125,652); Matang (37,774); Chambhar (8,637)
Jalgaon	42,29,917	3,89,273	9.20	Mahar (255,093); Chambhar (54,414); Matang (32,503)
Jalna	19,59,046	2,72,266	13.89	Mahar (149,532); Matang (83,460); Chambhar (23,890)
Kolhapur	38,76,001	5,04,461	13.01	Mahar (302,620); Matang (95,223); Chambhar (59,699)
Latur	24,54,196	4,80,913	19.59	Mahar (225,089); Matang (197,655); Chambhar (25,850)
Mumbai	30,85,411	2,19,934	7.13	Mahar (64,688); Chambhar (60,583); Meghwal (23,745)
Mumbai Suburban	93,56,962	5,83,302	6.23	Mahar (239,262); Chambhar (138,656); Matang (60,332)
Nagpur	46,53,570	8,67,713	18.65	Mahar (687,220); Chambhar (71,257); Matang (36,332)
Nanded	33,61,292	6,40,483	19.05	Mahar (336,341); Matang (237,131); Chambhar (14,622)
Nandurbar	16,48,295	47,985	2.91	Mahar (34,476); Chambhar (5,590); Balmiki (1,891)
Nashik	61,07,187	5,54,687	9.08	Mahar (371,544); Matang (76,238); Chambhar (65,049)
Osmanabad	16,57,576	2,65,184	15.99	Mahar (142,890); Matang (77,912); Chambhar (26,278)
Parbhani	18,36,086	2,47,308	13.47	Mahar (149,535); Matang (64,434); Chambhar (12,152)
Pune	94,29,408	11,80,703	12.52	Mahar (575,438); Matang (350,012); Chambhar (133,383)
Raigarh	26,34,200	1,34,952	5.12	Mahar (72,402); Chambhar (20,985); Matang (9,083)
Ratnagiri	16,15,069	66,948	4.14	Mahar (42,955); Chambhar (13,298); Matang (1,410)
Sangli	28,22,143	3,53,093	12.51	Mahar (153,698); Matang (108,082); (Chambhar (53,602)
Satara	30,03,741	3,23,236	10.71	Mahar (154,398); Matang (103,998); Chambhar (30,426)
Sindhudurg	8,49,651	55,586	6.54	Mahar (39,014); Chambhar (10,901); Khatik (347)
Solapur	43,17,756	6,49,745	15.05	Mahar (302,835); Matang (154,453); Chambhar (108,283)
Thane	1,10,60,148	7,30,089	6.60	Mahar (379,866); Chambhar (134,247); Matang (66,396)
Wardha	13,00,774	1,88,830	14.52	Mahar (148,385); Matang (19,264); Chambhar (8,829)
Washim	11,97,160	2,29,462	19.17	Mahar (162,518); Matang (47,171); Chambhar (9,500)
Yavatmal	27,72,348	3,28,518	11.85	Mahar (233,536); Matang (46,072); Chambhar (16,540)

=== Religion wise ===
Scheduled Castes	Total	Population by religion (2011)		
Scheduled Castes	Total	Hindus	Sikhs	Buddhists
Ager	896	820	1	75
Anamuk	68	57	0	11
Aray Mala	350	345	0	5
Arwa Mala	503	501	0	2
Bahna	210	169	0	41
Bakad	1,649	1,429	8	212
Balai	16,957	16,506	15	436
Basor, etc.	55,564	55,090	9	465
Beda Jangam	27,168	26,469	9	690
Bedar	14,029	13,956	2	71
Bhambi, Chambhar, etc.	14,11,072	13,93,097	563	17,412
Bhangi, Mehtar, Balmiki, etc.	2,17,166	2,15,094	340	1,732
Bindla	625	606	1	18
Byagara	379	351	0	28
Chalavadi, Channayya	3,309	2,822	5	482
Holeya Dasar, etc.	608	600	0	8
Dakkal, Dokkalwar	950	933	3	14
Dhor, Kankayya	1,16,287	1,14,413	41	833
Dom, Domar	3,690	3,599	0	91
Ellamalwar, Yellammalawandhlu	3,306	3,288	1	17
Ganda, etc.	585	562	0	23
Garoda, etc.	601	575	0	26
Ghasi, Ghasiya	1,989	1,954	5	30
Halleer	102	99	0	3
Halsar	148	144	1	3
Holar, Valhar	1,08,908	1,07,968	11	929
Holaya	18,263	17,398	9	856
Kaikadi	5,599	5,489	0	110
Katia, Patariya	5,207	5,085	0	122
Khangar	2,020	1,993	1	26
Khatik, Chikwa	1,08,491	1,07,869	79	543
Kolupulvandhlu	33	33	0	0
Kori	16,018	15,553	14	451
Lingader	5,298	5,269	0	29
Madgi	56,481	53,556	23	2,902
Madiga	15,318	15,162	37	119
Mahar	80,60,060	30,54,158	8,081	49,43,821
Mahyavanshi, Dhedh, Vankar	14,939	14,807	3	129
Mala	15,266	14,894	10	362
Mala Dasari	1,789	1,748	0	41
Mala Hannai	27	27	0	0
Mala Jangam	8,491	8,444	1	46
Mala Masti	17	17	0	0
Mala Sale, Netkani	269	250	0	19
Mala Sanyasi	46	46	0	0
Mang, Matang, etc.	24,88,531	24,52,170	530	35,831
Mang Garodi	39,993	39,762	14	217
Manne	2,542	2,488	11	43
Mashti	69	47	4	18
Meghwal	40,416	40,296	12	108
Mitha Ayalval	38	38	0	0
Mukri	54	49	1	4
Nadia, Hadi	333	330	0	3
Pasi	24,664	24,442	21	201
Sansi	491	481	2	8
Shenva	1,326	1,223	10	93
Sindhollu	1,002	989	7	6
Tirgar	80	80	0	0
Turi	490	455	0	35
Generic castes, etc.	4,09,118	2,13,035	1,599	1,94,484
	13,275,898	80,60,130	11,484	52,04,284
