= List of Scheduled Castes in Andhra Pradesh and Telangana =

Scheduled Castes in Andhra Pradesh & Telangana
- Classification: Scheduled Caste
- Languages: Telugu
- Country: India
- Populated states: Andhra Pradesh, Telangana
- Region: South India
- Population: 13,878,078
- Subdivisions: Andhra Pradesh - 59; Telangana - 59
- Reservation (Employment): 15%

The Dalits, once referred to as "untouchables" and currently recognized as Scheduled Castes by official designation, make up around one-sixth of India's population. These Scheduled Castes are predominantly concentrated in rural areas. Throughout centuries, they have endured the status of second-class citizens and were often excluded from India's varna system, a social hierarchy.

As per the 2011 census of India, in the United State of Andhra Pradesh, the total population of Scheduled Castes is 13,878,078 individuals, comprising 6,913,047 males and 6,965,031 females. Out of this population, 10,846,333 people live in rural areas. This represents approximately 6.89% of India's total Scheduled Caste population, which stands at 201,378,086.

Andhra Pradesh, prior to the formation of Telangana, comprised 60 distinct castes. Following the creation of Telangana, the Beda (Budga) Jangam caste was excluded from the list of Andhra Pradesh, while the Godagali caste was removed from Telangana. Consequently, each state now consists of 59 castes, reshaping the demographic composition in the aftermath of the state division.

== List ==
=== Andhra Pradesh ===
1. Adi Andhra
2. Adi Dravida
3. Anamuk
4. Aray Mala
5. Arundhatiya
6. Arwa Mala
7. Bariki
8. Bavuri
9. Bindla
10. Byagara, Byagari
11. Chachati
12. Chalavadi
13. Chamar, Mochi, Muchi, Chamar-Ravidas, Chamar-Rohidas
14. Chambhar
15. Chandala
16. Dakkal, Dokkalwar
17. Dandasi
18. Dhor
19. Dom, Dombara, Paidi, Pano
20. Ellamalawar, Yellammalawandlu
21. Ghasi, Haddi, Relli Chachandi
22. Godagali, Godagula (in the districts of Srikakulam, Vizianagaram and Vishakhapatanam)
23. Godari
24. Gosangi
25. Holeya
26. Holeya Dasari
27. Jaggali
28. Jambuvulu
29. Kolupulavandlu, Pambada, Pambanda, Pambala
30. Madasi Kuruva, Madari Kuruva
31. Madiga
32. Madiga Dasu, Mashteen
33. Mahar
34. Mala Dasari
35. Mala Dasu
36. Mala Hannai
37. Mala Masti
38. Mala Sale, Netkani
39. Mala Sanyasi
40. Mala, Mala Ayawaru
41. Malajangam
42. Mang
43. Mang Garodi
44. Manne
45. Mashti
46. Matangi
47. Mehtar
48. Mitha Ayyalvar
49. Mundala
50. Paky, Moti, Thoti
51. Pamidi
52. Panchama, Pariah
53. Relli
54. Samagara
55. Samban
56. Sapru
57. Sindhollu, Chindollu
58. Valluvan
59. Yatala

=== Telangana ===
1. Adi Andhra
2. Adi Dravida
3. Anamuk
4. Aray Mala
5. Arundhatiya
6. Arwa Mala
7. Bariki
8. Bavuri
9. Beda (Budga) Jangam (in the districts of Hyderabad, Ranga Reddy, Mahbubnagar, Adilabad, Nizamabad, Medak, Karimnagar, Warangal, Khammam and Nalgonda)
10. Bindla
11. Byagara, Byagari
12. Chachati
13. Chalavadi
14. Chamar, Mochi, Muchi, Chamar-Ravidas, Chamar-Rohidas
15. Chambhar
16. Chandala
17. Dakkal, Dokkalwar
18. Dandasi
19. Dhor
20. Dom, Dombara, Paidi, Pano
21. Ellamalawar, Yellammalawandlu
22. Ghasi, Haddi, Relli Chachandi
23. Godari
24. Gosangi
25. Holeya
26. Holeya Dasari
27. Jaggali
28. Jambuvulu
29. Kolupulavandlu, Pambada, Pambanda, Pambala
30. Madasi Kuruva, Madari Kuruva
31. Madiga
32. Madiga Dasu, Mashteen
33. Mahar
34. Mala Dasari
35. Mala Dasu
36. Mala Hannai
37. Mala Masti
38. Mala Sale, Netkani
39. Mala Sanyasi
40. Mala, Mala Ayawaru
41. Malajangam
42. Mang
43. Mang Garodi
44. Manne
45. Mashti
46. Matangi
47. Mehtar
48. Mitha Ayyalvar
49. Mundala
50. Paky, Moti, Thoti
51. Pamidi
52. Panchama, Pariah
53. Relli
54. Samagara
55. Samban
56. Sapru
57. Sindhollu, Chindollu
58. Valluvan
59. Yatala

== Demographics ==
=== Community wise ===
Communities	Total (2011)	Andhra Pradesh		Telangana	
Communities	Total (2011)	Population	Percent (of total)	Population	Percent (of total)
Adi Andhra	206,534	204,235		2,289	
Adi Dravida	266,089	265,438		651	
Anamuk	43	26		17	
Aray Mala	3,393	1,401		1,992	
Arundhatiya	30,190	30,083		107	
Arwa Mala	13,485	5,087		8,398	
Bariki	1,394	1,311		83	
Bavuri	890	763		127	
Beda (Budga) Jangam	111,710			111,710	
Bindla	14,815	1,733		13,082	
Byagara, Byagari	9,840	168		9,672	
Chachati	1,466	1,341		125	
Chalavadi	338	178		160	
Chamar, Mochi, Muchi, Chamar-Ravidas, Chamar-Rohidas	20,380	3,312		17,068	
Chambhar	674	42		632	
Chandala	76	12		64	
Dakkal, Dokkalwar	3,820	1,262		2,558	
Dandasi	5,351	5,265		86	
Dhor	2,229	83		2,146	
Dom, Dombara, Paidi, Pano	39,169	37,243		1,926	
Ellamalawar, Yellammalawandlu	1,382	878		504	
Ghasi, Haddi, Relli, Chachandi	3,093	3,009		84	
Godagali	2,782	2,782			
Godari	1,020	812		208	
Gosangi	23,401	50		23,351	
Holeya	526	84		442	
Holeya Dasari	11,041	2,559		8,482	
Jaggali	3,120	541		2,579	
Jambuvulu	6,785	6,677		108	
Kolupulvandlu, Pambada, Pambanda, Pambala	1,101	170		931	
Madasi Kuruva, Madari Kuruva	6,843	3,136		3,707	
Madiga	6,702,609	3,468,967		3,233,642	
Madiga Dasu, Mashteen	7,868	6,205		1,663	
Mahar	36,238	4,300		31,938	
Mala, Mala Ayawaru	5,570,244	4,043,101		1,527,143	
Mala Dasari	16,341	9,711		6,630	
Mala Dasu	11,754	10,829		925	
Mala Hannai	99	62		37	
Malajangam	3,484	297		3,187	
Mala Masti	783	675		108	
Mala Sale, Netkani	133,247	175		133,072	
Mala Sanyasi	192	30		162	
Mang	13,365	105		13,260	
Mang Garodi	1,397	5		1,392	
Manne	40,381	10,725		29,656	
Mashti	1,455	209		1,246	
Matangi	730	26		704	
Mehtar	7,037	64		6,973	
Mitha Ayyalvar	3,143	25		3,118	
Mundala	622	410		212	
Paky, Moti, Thoti	5,456	4,509		947	
Pamidi	2,807	2,756		51	
Panchama, Pariah	988	925		63	
Relli	135,608	132,583		3,025	
Samagara	1,129	83		1,046	
Samban	3,754	3,646		108	
Sapru	466	422		44	
Sindhollu, Chindollu	3,931	59		3,872	
Yatala	1,104	941		163	
Valluvan	809	717		92	
Generic castes, etc (those who identified as Dalit, Harijan, or others)	378,067	1,63,155		214,912	
	13,878,078	8,445,398		5,432,680	

=== District wise ===
Districts		Scheduled Castes		
Name	Population (2011)	Population	Percent	Top 3 largest castes (by population)
Telangana
Adilabad	2,741,239	488,596	17.82	Madiga (160,420); Mala (153,210); Netkani (82,638)
Nizamabad	2,551,335	371,074	14.54	Madiga (170,681); Mala (157,559); Gosangi (12,490)
Karimnagar	3,776,269	709,757	18.79	Madiga (418,263); Mala (201,719); Netkani (30,712)
Medak	3,033,288	537,947	17.73	Madiga (296,527); Mala (183,834); Beda Jangam (14,057)
Hyderabad	3,943,323	247,927	6.29	Madiga (130,812); Mala (92,464); Chamar (3,987)
Ranga Reddy	5,296,741	652,042	12.31	Madiga (385,847); Mala (186,084); Beda Jangam (13,460)
Mahabubnagar	4,053,028	708,954	17.49	Madiga (522,051); Mala (117,272); Beda Jangam (18,570)
Nalgonda	3,488,809	637,385	18.27	Madiga (444,040); Mala (147,048); Beda Jangam (15,987)
Warangal	3,512,576	616,102	17.54	Madiga (445,009); Mala (112,555); Beda Jangam (18,160)
Khammam	2,797,370	462,896	16.55	Madiga (259,992); Mala (175,488); Netkani (6,688)
Andhra Pradesh
Srikakulam	2,703,114	255,664	9.46	Mala (167,873); Madiga (29,764); Relli (23,504)
Vizianagaram	2,344,474	247,728	10.57	Mala (128,487); Madiga (52,336); Relli (27,649)
Visakhapatnam	4,290,589	329,486	7.68	Mala (187,132); Madiga (69,791); Relli (47,082)
East Godavari	5,154,296	945,269	18.34	Mala (647,571); Madiga (209,206); Adi Andhra (46,063)
West Godavari	3,936,966	811,698	17.97	Mala (459,744); Madiga (285,602); Adi Andhra (45,209)
Krishna	4,517,398	871,063	19.28	Madiga (444,734); Mala (389,665); Relli (8,840)
Guntur	4,887,813	957,407	19.59	Madiga (472,111); Mala (453,823); Mala Dasu (5,992)
Prakasam	3,397,448	787,861	23.19	Madiga (415,095); Mala (347,274); Adi Andhra (13,143)
Potti Sreeramulu Nellore	2,963,557	666,588	22.49	Mala (414,654); Madiga (201,195); Arundhatiya (26,489)
Kadapa	2,882,469	465,794	16.16	Mala (229,329); Madiga (206,897); Adi Andhra (15,228)
Kurnool	4,053,463	737,945	18.20	Madiga (462,369); Mala (238,512); Adi Andhra (2,987)
Anantapur	4,081,148	583,135	14.29	Madiga (475,632); Mala (73,525); Adi Andhra (5,802)
Chittoor	4,174,064	785,760	18.82	Mala (305,512); Adi Dravida (263,229); Madiga (144,235)
	84,520,777	13,878,078	16.42	

== See also ==
- Karamchedu massacre
- Tsundur massacre
- Neerukonda massacre
- List of Telugu castes
- List of Scheduled Tribes in Andhra Pradesh
