= List of Scheduled Castes =

This is a list of Scheduled Castes in India. The Scheduled Castes and Scheduled Tribes are those considered the most socio-economically disadvantaged in India, and are officially defined in the Constitution of India in order to aid equality initiatives. The Constitution (Scheduled Castes) Order, 1950 lists 1,109 castes across 28 states.

== Andhra Pradesh ==
1. Adi Andhra
2. Adi Dravida
3. Anamuk
4. Aray Mala
5. Arundhatiya
6. Arwa Mala
7. Bariki
8. Bavuri
9. Bindla
10. Byagara, Byagari
11. Chachati
12. Chalavadi
13. Chamar, Mochi, Muchi, Chamar-Ravidas, Chamar-Rohidas
14. Chambhar
15. Chandala
16. Dakkal, Dokkalwar
17. Dandasi
18. Dhor
19. Dom, Dombara, Paidi, Pano
20. Ellamalawar, Yellammalawandlu
21. Ghasi, Haddi, Relli Chachandi
22. Godagali, Godagula (in the districts of Srikakulam, Vizianagaram and Vishakhapatanam)
23. Godari
24. Gosangi
25. Holeya
26. Holeya Dasari
27. Jaggali
28. Jambuvulu
29. Kolupulavandlu, Pambada, Pambanda, Pambala
30. Madasi Kuruva, Madari Kuruva
31. Madiga
32. Madiga Dasu, Mashteen
33. Mahar
34. Mala Dasari
35. Mala Dasu
36. Mala Hannai
37. Mala Masti
38. Mala Sale, Netkani
39. Mala Sanyasi
40. Mala, Mala Ayawaru
41. Malajangam
42. Mang
43. Mang Garodi
44. Manne
45. Mashti
46. Matangi
47. Mehtar
48. Mitha Ayyalvar
49. Mundala
50. Paky, Moti, Thoti
51. Pamidi
52. Panchama, Pariah
53. Relli
54. Samagara
55. Samban
56. Sapru
57. Sindhollu, Chindollu
58. Valluvan
59. Yatala

== Assam ==
1. Bansphor
2. Bhuinmali, Mali
3. Brittial Bania, Bania
4. Dhupi, Dhobi
5. Dugla, Dholi
6. Hira
7. Jalkeot
8. Jhalo, Malo, Jhalo-Malo
9. Kaibartta, Jaliya
10. Lalbegi
11. Mahara
12. Mehtar, Bhangi
13. Muchi, Rishi
14. Namasudra
15. Patni
16. Sutradhar

== Bihar ==
1. Bantar
2. Bauri
3. Bhogta
4. Bhuiya
5. Bhumij
6. Chamar, Mochi, Chamar-Rabidas, Chamar-Ravidas, Chamar-Rohidas, Charmarkar
7. Chaupal
8. Dabgar
9. Dhobi, Rajak
10. Dom, Dhangad, Bansphor, Dharikar, Dharkar, Domra
11. Dusadh, Dhari, Dharhi
12. Ghasi
13. Halalkhor
14. Hari, Mehtar, Bhangi
15. Kanjar
16. Kurariar
17. Lalbegi
18. Musahar
19. Nat
20. Pan, Sawasi, Panr
21. Pasi
22. Rajwar
23. Turi

== Chandigarh ==
1. Ad Dharmi
2. Balmiki, Chura or Bhangi
3. Bangali
4. Barar, Burar or Berar
5. Batwal
6. Barwala
7. Bauria or Bawaria
8. Bazigar
9. Chamar, Jatia Chamar,
10. Rehgar,
11. Raigar,
12. Ramdasi or Ravidasi
13. Chanal
14. Dagi
15. Darain
16. Dhanak
17. Dhogri, Dhangri or Siggi
18. Dumna,
19. Gagra
20. Gandhila or Gandil Gondola
21. Kabirpanthi or Julaha
22. Khatik
23. Kori or Koli
24. Marija or Marecha
25. Mazhabi
26. Megh
27. Nat
28. Od
29. Pasi
30. Perna
31. Pherera
32. Sanhai
33. Sanhal
34. Sansi,
35. Bhedkut or Manesh
36. Sansoi
37. Sapela
38. Sarera
39. Sikligar
40. Sirkiband

== Chhattisgarh ==
1. Audhelia
2. Bagri, Bagdi
3. Bahna, Bahana
4. Balahi, Balai
5. Banchada
6. Barahar, Basod
7. Bargunda
8. Basor, Burud, Bansor, Bansodi, Bansphor, Basar
9. Bedia
10. Beldar, Sunkar
11. Bhangi, Mehtar, Balmiki, Lalbegi, Dharkar
12. Bhanumati
13. Chadar
14. Chamar, Chamari, Bairwa, Bhambhi, Jatav, Mochi, Regar, Nona, Rohidas, Ramnami, Satnami, Surjyabanshi, Surjyaramnami, Ahirwar, Chamar, Mangan, Raidas
15. Chidar
16. Chikwa, Chikvi
17. Chitar
18. Dahait, Dahayat, Dahat
19. Dewar
20. Dhanuk
21. Dhed, Dher
22. Dohor
23. Dom, Dumar, Dome, Domar, Doris
24. Ganda, Gandi
25. Ghasi, Ghasia
26. Holiya
27. Kanjar
28. Katia, Patharia
29. Khangar, Kanera, Mirdha
30. Khatik
31. Koli, Kori
32. Kuchbandhia
33. Mahar, Mehra, Mehar
34. Mang, Mang Garodi, Mang Garudi, Dankhani Mang, Mang Mahasi, Madari, Garudi, Radhe Mang
35. Meghwal
36. Moghia
37. Muskhan
38. Nat, Kalbelia, Sapera, Navdigar, Kubutar
39. Pasi
40. Rujjhar
41. Sansi, Sansia
42. Silawat
43. Turi
44. Zamral

== Dadra & Nagar Haveli ==
1. Bhangi
2. Chamar
3. Mahar
4. Mahayavanshi

== Daman & Diu ==
1. Bhangi (Hadi)
2. Chambhar, Mochi
3. Mahar
4. Mahyavanshi (Vankar)
5. Mang

== Delhi ==
1. Adi-Dharmi
2. Agria
3. Aheria
4. Balai
5. Banjara
6. Bawaria
7. Bazigar
8. Bhangi
9. Bhil
10. Chamar, Chanwar Chamar, Jatya or Jatav Chamar, Mochi, Ramdasia, Ravidasi, Raidasi, Rehgarh or Raigar
11. Chohra (Sweeper)
12. Chuhra (Balmiki)
13. Dhanak or Dhanuk
14. Dhobi
15. Dom
16. Gharrami
17. Julaha (Weaver)
18. Kabirpanthi
19. Kachhandha
20. Kanjar or Giarah
21. Khatik
22. Koli(Kolhi)
23. Lalbegi
24. Madari
25. Mallah
26. Mazhabi
27. Meghwal(Meghwar)
28. Naribut
29. Nat (Rana), Badi
30. Pasi
31. Perna
32. Sansi or Bhedkut
33. Sapera
34. Sikligar
35. Singiwala or Kalbelia
36. Sirkiband

== Goa ==
1. Bhangi (Hadi)
2. Chambhar
3. Mahar
4. Mahyavanshi (Vankar)
5. Mang

== Gujarat ==
1. Ager
2. Bakad, Bant
3. Balahi, Balai
4. Bawa-Dedh, Dedh-Sadhu
5. Bhambi, Bhambhi, Asadaru, Asodi, Chamadia, Chamar, Chamar-Ravidas, Chambhar, Chamgar, Haralayya, Harali, Khalpa, Machigar, Mochigar, Madar, Madig, Mochi (in Dangs district and Umergaon Taluka of Valsad district only), Nalia, Telugu Mochi, Kamati Mochi, Ranigar, Rohidas, Rohit, Samgar
6. Bhangi, Mehtar
7. Bhangi, Mehtar, Olgana, Rukhi, Malkana, Halalkhor, Lalbegi, Balmiki, Korar, Zadmalli, Barwashia, Barwasia, Jamphoda, Zampada, Zampda, Rushi, Valmiki
8. Chalvadi, Channayya
9. Chenna Dasar, Holaya Dasar
10. Chikwa, Chikvi
11. Dangashia
12. Dhor, Kakkayya, Kankayya
13. Garmatang
14. Garoda, Garo
15. Halleer
16. Halsar, Haslar, Hulasvar, Halasvar
17. Holar, Valhar
18. Holaya, Holer
19. Koli, Kori
20. Kotwal (in Bhind, Dhar, Dewas, Guna, Gwalior, Indore, Jhabua, Khargone, Mandsaur, Morena, Rajgarh, Ratlam, Shajapur, Shivpuri, Ujjain and Vidisha districts)
21. Lingader
22. Mahar, Taral, Dhegu Megu
23. Mahyavansi, Dhed, Dhedh, Vankar, Maru Vankar, Antyaj
24. Mang, Matang, Minimadig
25. Mang-Garudi
26. Meghval, Meghwal, Menghvar
27. Mukri
28. Nadia, Hadi
29. Pasi
30. Senva, Shenva, Chenva, Sedma, Rawat
31. Shemalia
32. Thori
33. Tirgar, Tirbanda
34. Turi
35. Turi Barot, Dedh Barot

== Haryana ==
1. Ad Dharmi
2. Balmiki
3. Bangali
4. Barar, Burar, Berar, Barwala
5. Bauria, Bawaria
6. Bazigar
7. Chamar, Jatia Chamar, Rehgar, Raigar, Ramdasi, Ravidasi, Balahi, Batoi, Bhatoi, Bhambi, Chamar-Rohidas, Jatav, Jatava, Mochi, Ramdasia
8. Chanal
9. Dagi
10. Darain
11. Deha, Dhaya, Dhea
12. Dhanak
13. Dhogri, Dhangri, Siggi
14. Dumna, Mahasha, Doom
15. Gagra
16. Gandhila, Gandil Gondola
17. Kabirpanthi, Julaha
18. Khatik
19. Kori, Koli
20. Marija, Marecha
21. Mazhabi, Mazhabi Sikh
22. Megh, Meghwal
23. Nat, Badi
24. Od
25. Pasi
26. Perna
27. Pherera
28. Sanhai
29. Sanhal
30. Sansi, Bhedkut, Manesh
31. Sansoi
32. Sapela, Sapera
33. Sarera
34. Sikligar, Bariya
35. Sirkiband
36. Nai

== Himachal Pradesh ==
1. Ad Dharmi
2. Badhi, Nagalu
3. Balmiki, Bhangi, Chuhra, Chura, Chuhre
4. Bandhela
5. Bangali
6. Bansi
7. Barad
8. Barar, Burar, Berar
9. Barwala
10. Batwal
11. Bauria, Bawaria
12. Bazigar
13. Bhanjra, Bhanjre
14. Chamar, Jatia Chamar, Rehgar, Raigar, Ramdasi, Ravidasi, Ramdasia, Mochi
15. Chanal
16. Chhimbe, Dhobi
17. Dagi
18. Darai, Daryai
19. Darain
20. Daule, Daole
21. Dhaki, Toori
22. Dhanuk
23. Dhaogri, Dhuai
24. Dhogri, Dhangri, Siggi
25. Doomna, Dumna, Dumne,
26. Gagra
27. Gandhila, Gandil Gondola
28. Hali
29. Hesi
30. Jogi
31. Julaha, Julahe, Kabirpanthi, Keer
32. Kamoh, Dagoli
33. Karoack
34. Khatik
35. Kori, Koli
36. Lohar
37. Marija, Marecha
38. Mazhabi
39. Megh
40. Nat
41. Od
42. Pasi
43. Perna
44. Phrera, Pherera
45. Rehar, Rehara
46. Sanhai
47. Sanhal
48. Sansi, Bhedkut, Manesh
49. Sansoi
50. Sapela
51. Sarde, Sarera, Sarare, Siryare, Sarehde
52. Sikligar
53. Sipi
54. Sirkiband
55. Teli
56. Thathiar, Thathera

== Jammu & Kashmir ==
1. Barwala
2. Batwal
3. Chamar or Ramdasia, Chamar-Ravidas, Chamar-Rohidas
4. Chura, Bhangi, Balmiki, Mehtar
5. Dhyar
6. Doom or Mahasha, Dumna
7. Gardi
8. Jolaha
9. Megh or Kabirpanthi
10. Ratal
11. Saryara
12. Watal

== Jharkhand ==
1. Bantar
2. Bauri
3. Bhogta
4. Bhuiya
5. Chamar, Mochi
6. Chaupal
7. Dabgar
8. Dhobi
9. Dom, Dhangad
10. Dusadh, Dhari, Dharhi
11. Ghasi
12. Halalkhor
13. Hari, Mehtar, Bhangi
14. Kanjar
15. Kurariar
16. Lalbegi
17. Musahar
18. Nat
19. Pan, Sawasi
20. Pasi
21. Rajwar
22. Turi

== Karnataka ==
1. Adi Andhra
2. Adi Dravida
3. Adi Karnataka
4. Adiya (in Coorg district)a
5. Ager
6. Ajila
7. Anamuk
8. Aray Mala
9. Arunthathiyar
10. Arwa Mala
11. Baira
12. Bakad
13. Bakuda
14. Balagai
15. Bandi
16. Banjara, Lambani, Lambada, Lambadi, Lamani, Sugali, Sukali
17. Bant (in Belgaum, Bijapur, Dharwar and North Kanara districts)b
18. Bathada
19. Beda Jangam, Budga Jangam
20. Bellara
21. Bhambi, Bhambhi, Asadaru, Asodi, Chamadia, Chamar, Chambhar, Chamgar, Haralayya, Harali, Khalpa, Machigar, Mochigar, Madar, Madig, Mochi, Muchi, Telegu Mochi, Kamati Mochi, Ranigar, Rohidas, Rohit, Samgar
22. Bhangi, Mehtar, Olgana, Rukhi, Malkana, Halalkhor, Lalbegi, Balmiki, Korar, Zadmalli
23. Bhovi, Od, Odde, Vaddar, Waddar, Voddar, Woddar
24. Bindla
25. Byagara
26. Chakkiliyan
27. Chalavadi, Chalvadi, Channayya
28. Chandala
29. Chenna Dasar, Holaya Dasar
30. Dakkal, Dokkalwar
31. Dakkaliga
32. Dhor, Kakkayya, Kankayya
33. Dom, Dombara, Paidi, Pano
34. Ellamalwar, Yellammalawandlu
35. Ganti Chores
36. Garoda, Garo
37. Godda
38. Gosangi
39. Halleer
40. Halsar, Haslar, Hulasvar, Halasvar
41. Handi Jogis
42. Hasla
43. Holar, Valhar
44. Holaya, Holer, Holeya
45. Holeya Dasari
46. Jaggali
47. Jambuvulu
48. Kovida
49. Kalladi
50. Kepmaris
51. Kolupulvandlu
52. Koosa
53. Koracha, Korachar
54. Korama, Korava, Koravar
55. Kotegar, Metri
56. Kudumban
57. Kuravan
58. Lingader
59. Machala
60. Madari
61. Madiga
62. Mahar, Taral, Dhegu Megu,
63. Mahyavanshi, Dhed, Vankar, Maru Vankar
64. Maila
65. Mala
66. Mala Dasari
67. Mala Hannai
68. Mala Jangam
69. Mala Masti
70. Mala Sale, Netkani
71. Mala Sanyasi
72. Mang Garudi, Mang Garodi
73. Mang, Matang, Minimadig
74. Manne
75. Masthi
76. Mavilan
77. Meghval, Menghvar
78. Moger
79. Mukri
80. Mundala
81. Nadia, Hadi
82. Nalakeyava
83. Nalkadaya
84. Nayadi
85. Pale
86. Pallan
87. Pambada
88. Panchama
89. Panniandi
90. Paraiyan, Paraya
91. Paravan
92. Raneyar
93. Samagara
94. Samban
95. Sapari
96. Sillekyathas
97. Sindhollu, Chindollu
98. Sudugadu Siddha
99. Thoti
100. Tirgar, Tirbanda
101. Valluvan

== Kerala ==
1. Adi Andhra
2. Adi Dravida
3. Adi Karnataka
4. Ajila
5. Arunthathiyar
6. Ayyanavar
7. Baira
8. Bakuda
9. Bathada
10. Bharathar (other than Parathar), Paravan
11. Chakkiliyan
12. Chamar, Muchi
13. Chandala
14. Cheruman
15. Domban
16. Gosangi
17. Holeya
18. Kadaiyan
19. Kakkalan, Kakkan
20. Kalladi
21. Kanakkan, Padanna, Padannan
22. Kavara (other than Telugu speaking or Tamil speaking Balija, Kavarai, Gavara, Gavarai, Gavarai Naidu, Balija Naidu, Gajalu Balija or Valai Chetty)
23. Koosa
24. Kootan, Koodan
25. Kudumban
26. Kuravan, Sidhanar, Kuravar, Kurava, Sidhana
27. Maila
28. Malayan [in the areas comprising the Malabar district as specified by sub-section (2) of section 5 of the States Reorganisation Act, 1956 (37of 1956)]a
29. Mannan, Pathiyan, Perumannan, Vannan, Velan
30. Moger (other than Mogeyar)
31. Mundala
32. Nalakeyava
33. Nalkadaya
34. Nayadi
35. Nerian
36. Pallan
37. Palluvan
38. Pambada
39. Panan
40. Paraiyan, Parayan, Sambavar, Sambavan, Sambava, Paraya, Paraiya, Parayar
41. Pulayan, Cheramar, Pulaya, Pulayar, Cherama, Cheraman, Wayanad Pulayan, Wayanadan Pulayan, Matha, Matha Pulayan
42. Puthirai Vannan
43. Raneyar
44. Samagara
45. Samban
46. Semman, Chemman, Chemmar
47. Thandan (excluding Ezhuvas and Thiyyas who are known as Thandan, in the erstwhile Cochin and Malabar areas) and (Carpenters who are known as Thachan, in the erstwhile Cochin and Travancore State)
48. Thoti
49. Vallon
50. Valluvan
51. Vetan
52. Vettuvan, Pulaya Vettuvan (in the areas of erstwhile Cochin State only)

== Madhya Pradesh ==
1. Audhelia
2. Bagri, Bagdi (excluding Rajput, Thakur sub-castes among Bagri, Bagdi)
3. Bahna, Bahana
4. Balahi, Balai
5. Banchada
6. Barahar, Basod
7. Bargunda
8. Basor, Burud, Bansor, Bansodi, Bansphor, Basar
9. Bedia
10. Beldar, Sunkar
11. Bhangi, Mehtar, Balmik, Lalbegi, Dharkar
12. Bhanumati
13. Chadar
14. Chamar, Chamari, Bairwa, Bhambi, Jatav, Mochi, Regar, Nona, Rohidas, Ramnami, Satnami, Surjyabanshi, Surjyaramnami, Ahirwar, Chamar Mangan, Raidas, suryavanshi, choudhary
15. Chidar
16. Chikwa, Chikvi
17. Chitar
18. Dahait, Dahayat, Dahat
19. Dewar
20. Dhanuk
21. Dhed, Dher
22. Dhobi (in Bhopal, Raisen and Sehore districts)
23. Dohor
24. Dom, Dumar, Dome, Domar, Doris
25. Ganda, Gandi
26. Ghasi, Ghasia
27. Holiya
28. Kanjar
29. Katia, Patharia
30. Khangar, Kanera, Mirdha
31. Khatik
32. Koli, Kori
33. Kotwal (in Bhind, Dhar, Dewas, Guna, Gwalior, Indore, Jhabua, Khargone, Mandsaur, Morena, Rajgarh, Ratlam, Shajapur, Shivpuri, Ujjain and Vidisha districts)a
34. Kuchbandhia
35. Kumhar (in Chhatarpur, Datia, Panna, Rewa, Satna, Shahdol, Sidhi and Tikamgarh districts)b
36. Mahar, Mehra, Mehar, Mahara
37. Mang, Mang Garodi, Mang Garudi, Dankhni Mang, Mang Mahasi, Madari, Garudi, Radhe Mang
38. Meghwal
39. Moghia
40. Muskhan
41. Nat, Kalbelia, Sapera, Navdigar, Kubutar
42. Pardhi (in Bhind, Dhar, Dewas, Guna, Gwalior, Indore, Jhabua, Khargone, Mandsaur, Morena, Rajgarh, Ratlam, Shajapur, Shivpuri, Ujjain and Vidisha districts)a
43. Pasi
44. Rujjhar
45. Sansi, Sansia
46. Sargara
47. Silawat
48. Zamral

== Maharashtra ==
1. Ager
2. Anamuk
3. Aray Mala
4. Arwa Mala
5. Bahna, Bahana
6. Bakad, Bant
7. Balahi, Balai
8. Basor, Burud, Bansor, Bansodi, Basod
9. Beda Jangam, Budga Jangam
10. Bedar
11. Bhambi, Bhambhi, Asadaru, Asodi, Chamadia, Chamar, Chamari, Chambhar, Chamgar, Haralayya, Harali, Khalpa, Machigar, Mochigar, Madar, Madig, Mochi, Telegu Mochi, Kamati Mochi, Ranigar, Rohidas, Nona, Ramnami, Rohit, Samgar, Samagara, Satnami, Surjyabanshi, Surjyaramnami, Charmakar, Pardeshi Chamar
12. Bhangi, Mehtar, Olgana, Rukhi, Malkana, Halalkhor, Lalbegi, Balmiki, Korar, Zadmalli, Hela
13. Bindla
14. Byagara
15. Chalvadi, Channayya
16. Chenna Dasar, Holaya Dasar, Holeya Dasari
17. Dakkal, Dokkalwar
18. Dhor, Kakkayya, Kankayya, Dohor
19. Dom, Dumar
20. Ellamalvar, Yellammalawandlu
21. Ganda, Gandi
22. Garoda, Garo
23. Ghasi, Ghasia
24. Halleer
25. Halsar, Haslar, Hulasvar, Halasvar
26. Holar, Valhar
27. Holaya, Holer, Holeya, Holiya
28. Kaikadi (in Akola, Amravati, Bhandara, Buldana, Nagpur, Wardha and Yavatmal districts and Chandrapur district, other than Rajura tahsil)a
29. Katia, Patharia
30. Khangar, Kanera, Mirdha
31. Khatik, Chikwa, Chikvi
32. Kolupulvandlu
33. Kori
34. Lingader
35. Madgi
36. Madiga
37. Mahar, Mehra, Taral, Dhegu Megu
38. Mahyavanshi, Dhed, Vankar, Maru Vankar
39. Mala
40. Mala Dasari
41. Mala Hannai
42. Mala Jangam
43. Mala Masti
44. Mala Sale, Netkani
45. Mala Sanyasi
46. Mang Garodi, Mang Garudi
47. Mang, Matang, Minimadig, Dankhni Mang, Mang Mahashi, Madari, Garudi, Radhe Mang
48. Manne
49. Mashti
50. Meghval, Menghvar
51. Mitha Ayyalvar
52. Mukri
53. Nadia, Hadi
54. Pasi
55. Sansi
56. Shenva, Chenva, Sedma, Ravat
57. Sindhollu, Chindollu
58. Tirgar, Tirbanda
59. Turi

== Manipur ==
1. Dhupi, Dhobi
2. Lois
3. Muchi, Ravidas
4. Namasudra
5. Patni
6. Sutradhar
7. Yaithibi

== Meghalaya ==
1. Bansphor
2. Bhuinmali, Mali
3. Brittial Bania, Bania
4. Dhupi, Dhobi
5. Dugla, Dholi
6. Hira
7. Jalkeot
8. Jhalo, Malo, Jhalo-Malo
9. Kaibartta, Jaliya
10. Lalbegi
11. Mahara
12. Mehtar, Bhangi
13. Muchi, Rishi
14. Namasudra
15. Patni
16. Sutradhar

== Mizoram ==
1. Bansphor
2. Bhuinmali, Mali
3. Brittial Bania, Bania
4. Dhupi, Dhobi
5. Dugla, Dholi
6. Hira
7. Jalkeot
8. Jhalo, Malo, Jhalo-Malo
9. Kaibartta, Jaliya
10. Lalbegi
11. Mahara
12. Mehtar, Bhangi
13. Muchi, Rishi
14. Namasudra
15. Patni
16. Sutradhar

== Odisha ==
1. Adi Andhra
2. Amant, Amat, Dandachhatra Majhi
3. Audhelia
4. Badaik
5. Bagheti, Baghuti
6. Bajikar
7. Bari
8. Bariki
9. Basor, Burud
10. Bauri, Buna Bauri, Dasia Bauri
11. Bauti
12. Bavuri
13. Bedia, Bejia
14. Beldar
15. Bhata
16. Bhoi
17. Chachati
18. Chakali
19. Chamar, Chamara, Chamar-Ravidas, Chamar-Rohidas, Mochi, Muchi, Satnami
20. Chandala
21. Chandhai Maru
22. Dandasi
23. Dewar, Dhibara, Keuta, Kaibarta
24. Dhanwar
25. Dhoba, Dhobi
26. Dom, Dombo, Duria Dom
27. Dosadha
28. Ganda
29. Ghantarghada, Ghantra
30. Ghasi, Ghasia
31. Ghogia
32. Ghusuria
33. Godagali
34. Godari
35. Godra
36. Gokha
37. Gorait, Korait
38. Haddi, Hadi, Hari
39. Irika
40. Jaggali
41. Kandra, Kandara, Kadama, Kuduma, Kodma, Kodama
42. Karua
43. Katia
44. Kela, Sapua Kela, Nalua Kela, Sabakhia Kela, Matia Kela
45. Khadala
46. Kodalo, Khodalo
47. Kori
48. Kummari
49. Kurunga
50. Laban
51. Laheri
52. Madari
53. Madiga
54. Mahuria
55. Mala, Jhala, Malo, Zala, Malha, Jhola
56. Mang
57. Mangali (in Koraput and Kalahandi districts)
58. Mangan
59. Mehra, Mahar
60. Mehtar, Bhangi
61. Mewar
62. Mirgan (in Navrangpur district)
63. Mundapotta
64. Musahar
65. Nagarchi
66. Namasudra
67. Paidi
68. Painda
69. Pamidi
70. Pan, Pano, Buna Pana, Desua Pana
71. Panchama
72. Panika
73. Panka
74. Pantanti
75. Pap
76. Pasi
77. Patial, Patikar, Patratanti, Patua
78. Rajna
79. Relli
80. Sabakhia
81. Samasi
82. Sanei
83. Sapari
84. Sauntia, Santia
85. Sidhria
86. Sinduria
87. Siyal, Khajuria
88. Tamadia
89. Tamudia
90. Tanla
91. Turi
92. Ujia
93. Valamiki, Valmiki

== Puducherry ==
1. Adi Andhra
2. Adi Dravida
3. Chakkiliyan
4. Jambuvulu
5. Kuravan
6. Madiga
7. Mala, Mala Masti
8. Paky
9. Pallan
10. Parayan, Sambavar
11. Puthirai Vannan
12. Samban
13. Thoti
14. Valluvan
15. Vetan
16. Vettiyan

== Punjab ==
1. Majhbi Sikh
2. Ad Dharmi
3. Balmiki, Chuhra, Bhangi
4. Bangali
5. Barar, Burar, Berar
6. Batwal, Barwala
7. Bauria, Bawaria
8. Bazigar
9. Chamar, Jatia Chamar, Rehgar, Raigar, Ramdasi, Ravidasi, Ramdasia, Ramdasia Sikh, Ravidasia, Ravidasia Sikh
10. Chanal
11. Dagi
12. Darain
13. Deha, Dhaya, Dhea
14. Dhanak
15. Dhogri, Dhangri, Siggi
16. Dumna, Mahasha, Doom
17. Gagra
18. Gandhila, Gandil Gondola
19. Kabirpanthi, Julaha
20. Khatik
21. Kori, Koli
22. Mahatam, Rai Sikh
23. Marija, Marecha
24. Mazhabi, Mazhabi Sikh
25. Megh
26. Mochi
27. Nat
28. Od
29. Pasi
30. Perna
31. Pherera
32. Sanhai
33. Sanhal
34. Sansi, Bhedkut, Manesh
35. Sansoi
36. Sapela
37. Sarera
38. Sikligar
39. Sirkiband

== Rajasthan ==
1. Adi Dharmi
2. Aheri
3. Badi
4. Bagri, Bagdi
5. Bairwa, Berwa
6. Bajgar
7. Balai
8. Bansphor, Bansphod
9. Baori
10. Bargi, Vargi, Birgi
11. Bawaria
12. Bedia, Beria
13. Bhand
14. Bhangi, Chura, Mehtar, Olgana, Rukhi, Malkana, Halalkhor, Lalbegi, Balmiki, Valmiki, Korar, Zadmalli
15. Bidakia
16. Bola
17. Chamar, Bhambhi, Bambhi, Bhambi, Jatia, Jatav, Jatava, Mochi, Raidas, Rohidas, Regar, Raigar, Ramdasia, Asadaru, Asodi, Chamadia, Chambhar, Chamgar, Haralayya, Harali, Khalpa, Machigar, Mochigar, Madar, Madig, Telegu Mochi, Kamati Mochi, Ranigar, Rohit, Samgar
18. Chandal
19. Dabgar
20. Dhanak, Dhanuk
21. Dhankia
22. Dhobi
23. Dholi
24. Dome, Dom
25. Gandia
26. Garancha, Gancha
27. Garo, Garura, Gurda, Garoda
28. Gavaria
29. Godhi
30. Jingar
31. Kalbelia, Sapera
32. Kamad, Kamadia
33. Kanjar, Kunjar
34. Kapadia Sansi
35. Khangar
36. Khatik
37. Koli, Kori
38. Kooch Band, Kuchband
39. Koria
40. Madari, Bazigar
41. Mahar, Taral, Dhegumegu
42. Mahyavanshi, Dhed, Dheda, Vankar, Maru Vankar
43. Majhabi
44. Mang Garodi, Mang Garudi
45. Mang, Matang, Minimadig
46. Megh, Meghval, Meghwal, Menghvar
47. Mehar
48. Nat, Nut
49. Pasi
50. Rawal
51. Salvi
52. Sansi
53. Santia, Satia
54. Sarbhangi
55. Sargara
56. Singiwala
57. Thori, Nayak
58. Tirgar, Tirbanda
59. Turi

== Sikkim ==
1. Damai (Nepali)
2. Kami (Nepali), Lohar (Nepali)
3. Sarki (Nepali)

== Tamil Nadu ==
1. Adi Andhra
2. Adi Dravida
3. Adi Karnataka
4. Ajila
5. Arunthathiyar
6. Ayyanavar (in Kanyakumari district and Shenkottah taluk of Tirunelveli district)
7. Baira
8. Bakuda
9. Bandi
10. Bellara
11. Bharatar (in Kanyakumari district and Shenkottah taluk of Tirunelveli district)
12. Chakkiliyan
13. Chalavadi
14. Chamar, Muchi
15. Chandala
16. Cheruman
17. Devendrakulathan
18. Dom, Dombara, Paidi, Pano
19. Domban
20. Godagali
21. Godda
22. Gosangi
23. Holeya
24. Jaggali
25. Jambuvulu
26. Kadaiyan
27. Kakkalan (in Kanyakumari district and Shenkottah taluk of Tirunelveli district)
28. Kalladi
29. Kanakkan, Padanna (in the Nilgiris district)
30. Kavara (in Kanyakumari district and Shenkottah taluk of Tirunelveli district)
31. Koliyan
32. Koosa
33. Kootan, Koodan (in Kanyakumari district and Shenkottah taluk of Tirunelveli district)
34. Kudumban
35. Koti
36. Madari
37. Madiga
38. Maila
39. Mala
40. Mannan (in Kanyakumari district and Shenkottah taluk of Tirunelveli district)
41. Mavilan
42. Moger
43. Mundala
44. Nalakeyava
45. Nayadi
46. Pagadai
47. Pallan
48. Palluvan
49. Pambada
50. Panan (in Kanyakumari district and Shenkottah taluk of Tirunelveli district)
51. Panchama
52. Pannadi
53. Panniandi
54. Paraiyan, Parayan, Sambavar
55. Paravan (in Kanyakumari district and Shenkottah taluk of Tirunelveli district)
56. Pathiyan (in Kanyakumari district and Shenkottah taluk of Tirunelveli district)
57. Pulayan, Cheramar
58. Puthirai Vannan
59. Raneyar
60. Samagara
61. Samban
62. Sapari
63. Semman
64. Thandan (in Kanyakumari district and Shenkottah taluk of Tirunelveli district)a
65. Thoti
66. Tiruvalluvar
67. Vallon
68. Valluvan
69. Vannan (in Kanyakumari district and Shenkottah taluk of Tirunelveli district)
70. Vathiriyan
71. Velan
72. Kadan (in Kanyakumari district and Shenkottah taluk of Tirunelveli district)
73. Vettiyan
74. Valaiyan (in Kanyakumari district and Shenkottah taluk of Tirunelveli district)

== Telangana ==
1. Adi Andhra
2. Adi Dravida
3. Anamuk
4. Aray Mala
5. Arundhatiya
6. Arwa Mala
7. Bariki
8. Bavuri
9. Beda (Budga) Jangam (in the districts of Hyderabad, Ranga Reddy, Mahbubnagar, Adilabad, Nizamabad, Medak, Karimnagar, Warangal, Khammam and Nalgonda)
10. Bindla
11. Byagara, Byagari
12. Chachati
13. Chalavadi
14. Chamar, Mochi, Muchi, Chamar-Ravidas, Chamar-Rohidas
15. Chambhar
16. Chandala
17. Dakkal, Dokkalwar
18. Dandasi
19. Dhor
20. Dom, Dombara, Paidi, Pano
21. Ellamalawar, Yellammalawandlu
22. Ghasi, Haddi, Relli Chachandi
23. Godari
24. Gosangi
25. Holeya
26. Holeya Dasari
27. Jaggali
28. Jambuvulu
29. Kolupulavandlu, Pambada, Pambanda, Pambala
30. Madasi Kuruva, Madari Kuruva
31. Madiga
32. Madiga Dasu, Mashteen
33. Mahar
34. Mala Dasari
35. Mala Dasu
36. Mala Hannai
37. Mala Masti
38. Mala Sale, Netkani
39. Mala Sanyasi
40. Mala, Mala Ayawaru
41. Malajangam
42. Mang
43. Mang Garodi
44. Manne
45. Mashti
46. Matangi
47. Mehtar
48. Mitha Ayyalvar
49. Mundala
50. Paky, Moti, Thoti
51. Pamidi
52. Panchama, Pariah
53. Relli
54. Samagara
55. Samban
56. Sapru
57. Sindhollu, Chindollu
58. Valluvan
59. Yatala

== Tripura ==
1. Bagdi
2. Bhuimali
3. Bhunar
4. Chamar, Muchi
5. Dandasi
6. Dhenuar
7. Dhoba
8. Dhuli, Sabdakar, Badyakar
9. Dum
10. Ghasi
11. Gour
12. Gur
13. Jalia Kaibarta
14. Kahar
15. Kalindi
16. Kan
17. Kanda
18. Kanugh
19. Keot
20. Khadit
21. Kharia
22. Koch
23. Koir
24. Kol
25. Kora
26. Kotal
27. Mahisyadas
28. Mali
29. Mehtor
30. Musahar
31. Namasudra
32. Natta, Nat
33. Patni
34. Sabar

== Uttar Pradesh ==
1. Agariya (excluding Sonbhadra district)
2. Badhik
3. Badi
4. Baheliya
5. Baiga (excluding Sonbhadra district)
6. Baiswar
7. Bajaniya
8. Bajgi
9. Balahar
10. Balai
11. Balmiki
12. Bangali
13. Banmanus
14. Bansphor
15. Barwar
16. Basor
17. Bawariya
18. Beldar
19. Beriya
20. Bhantu
21. Bhuiya (excluding Sonbhadra district)
22. Bhuyiar
23. Boria
24. Chamar, Dhusia, Jhusia, Jatava
25. Chero (excluding Sonbhadra and Varanasi districts)
26. Dabgar
27. Dhangar
28. Dhanuk
29. Dharkar
30. Dhobi
31. Dom
32. Domar
33. Dusadh
34. Gharami
35. Ghasiya
36. Gond (excluding Mehrajganj, Sidharth Nagar, Basti, Gorakhpur, Deoria, Mau, Azamgarh, Jonpur, Balia, Gazipur, Varanasi, Mirzapur and Sonbhadra districts)
37. Gual
38. Habura
39. Hari
40. Hela
41. Kalabaz
42. Kanjar
43. Kapariya
44. Karwal
45. Khairaha
46. Kharwar [ (excluding Benbansi) (excluding Deoria, Balia, Gazipur, Varanasi and Sonbhadra districts) ]
47. Khatik
48. Khorot
49. Kol
50. Kori
51. Korwa
52. Lalbegi
53. Majhwar
54. Mazhabi
55. Musahar
56. Nat
57. Pankha (excluding Sonbhadra and Mirzapur districts)
58. Parahiya (excluding Sonbhadra district)
59. Pasi, Tarmali
60. Patari (excluding Sonbhadra district)
61. Rawat
62. Saharya (excluding Lalitpur district)
63. Sanaurhiya
64. Sansiya
65. Shilpkar
66. Turaiha

== Uttarakhand ==
1. Agariya
2. Badhik
3. Badi
4. Baheliya
5. Baiga
6. Baiswar
7. Bajaniya
8. Bajgi
9. Balahar
10. Balai
11. Balmiki
12. Bangali
13. Banmanus
14. Bansphor
15. Barwar
16. Basor
17. Bawariya
18. Beldar
19. Beriya
20. Bhantu
21. Bhuiya
22. Bhuyiar
23. Boria
24. Chamar, Dhusia, Jhusia, Jatava
25. Chero
26. Dabgar
27. Dhangar
28. Dhanuk
29. Dharkar
30. Dhobi
31. Dom
32. Domar
33. Dusadh
34. Gharami
35. Ghasiya
36. Gond
37. Gual
38. Habura
39. Hari
40. Hela
41. Kalabaz
42. Kanjar
43. Kapariya
44. Karwal
45. Khairaha
46. Kharwar (excluding Benbansi)
47. Khatik
48. Khorot
49. Kol
50. Kori
51. Korwa
52. Lalbegi
53. Majhwar
54. Mazhabi
55. Musahar
56. Nat
57. Pankha
58. Parahiya
59. Pasi, Tarmali
60. Patari
61. Saharya
62. Sanaurhiya
63. Sansiya
64. Shilpkar
65. Turaiha

== West Bengal ==
1. Bagdi, Duley
2. Bahelia
3. Baiti
4. Bantar
5. Bauri
6. Beldar
7. Bhogta
8. Bhuimali
9. Bhuiya
10. Bind
11. Chain (in Malda, Murshidabad, Nadia and Dakshin Dinajpur districts)
12. Chamar, Charmakar, Mochi, Muchi, Rabidas, Ruidas, Rishi
13. Chaupal
14. Dabgar
15. Damai (Nepali)
16. Dhoba, Dhobi
17. Doai
18. Dom, Dhangad
19. Dosadh, Dusadh, Dhari, Dharhi
20. Ghasi
21. Gonrhi
22. Halalkhor
23. Hari, Mehtar, Mehtor, Bhangi, Balmiki
24. Jalia Kaibartta
25. Jhalo Malo, Malo
26. Kadar
27. Kami (Nepali)
28. Kandra
29. Kanjar
30. Kaora
31. Karenga, Koranga
32. Kaur
33. Keot, Keyot
34. Khaira
35. Khatik
36. Koch
37. Konai
38. Konwar
39. Kotal
40. Kurariar
41. Lalbegi
42. Lohar
43. Mahar
44. Mal
45. Mallah
46. Musahar
47. Namasudra
48. Nat
49. Nuniya
50. Paliya
51. Pan, Sawasi
52. Pasi
53. Patni
54. Pod, Poundra
55. Rajbanshi
56. Rajwar
57. Sarki (Nepali)
58. Sunri (Excluding Saha)
59. Tiyar
60. Turi

== Demographics ==
As per 2011 census of India, Scheduled Castes constituted a population of 201,378,086 accounting for 16.63% population of India.

S No	Community	Population	Recognized as SC (in states and union territories)	Notes
1	Chamar	c. 55 million	Andhra Pradesh, Assam, Bihar, Chandigarh, Chhattisgarh, Dadra and Nagar Haveli and Daman and Diu, Delhi, Goa, Gujarat, Haryana, Himachal Pradesh, Jammu and Kashmir, Jharkhand, Karnataka, Kerala, Madhya Pradesh, Maharashtra, Manipur, Odisha, Punjab, Rajasthan, Tamil Nadu, Telangana, Tripura, Uttar Pradesh, Uttarakhand, West Bengal	The largest Scheduled Caste community of India, predominately present in North and Central India. Counted along with sub-castes such as Ahirwar, Bhambi, Bhambi Khalpa, Chambhar, Dhusia, Jatav, Mochi, Muchis, Ramnami, Ravidas, Regar, Rohit, Satnami, Surjyabanshi, and others
2	Mahar	c. 10 million	Andhra Pradesh, Chhattisgarh, Dadra and Nagar Haveli and Daman and Diu, Goa, Gujarat, Karnataka, Madhya Pradesh, Maharashtra, Meghalaya, Mizoram, Odisha, Rajasthan, Tamil Nadu, Telangana, Tripura, West Bengal	The largest Scheduled Caste community of Maharashtra.
3	Adi Dravida	c. 8.5 million	Andhra Pradesh, Karnataka, Kerala, Puducherry, Tamil Nadu, Telangana	The largest Schedule caste community of Tamil Nadu, along considered as historical community Paraiyar.
4	Madiga	c. 8 million	Andhra Pradesh, Karnataka, Maharashtra, Manipur, Odisha, Tamil Nadu, Telangana	The largest Schedule caste community of Telangana.
5	Pasi	c. 7.5 million	Bihar, Chandigarh, Chhattisgarh, Delhi, Gujarat, Haryana, Himachal Pradesh, Jharkhand, Karnataka, Madhya Pradesh, Maharashtra, Odisha, Punjab, Rajasthan, Uttar Pradesh, Uttarakhand, West Bengal	Found predominantly in Uttar Pradesh and Bihar.
6	Balmiki	c. 6.5 million	Andhra Pradesh, Assam, Bihar, Chandigarh, Chhattisgarh, Dadra and Nagar Haveli and Daman and Diu, Delhi, Goa, Gujarat, Haryana, Himachal Pradesh, Jammu and Kashmir, Jharkhand, Karnataka, Kerala, Madhya Pradesh, Maharashtra, Manipur, Meghalaya, Mizoram, Odisha, Puducherry, Punjab, Rajasthan, Tamil Nadu, Telangana, Tripura, Uttar Pradesh, Uttarakhand, West Bengal	Found predominately in North India. Counted along with sub-castes such as Bhangi, Chuhra, Halalkhor, Hari, Hela, Lal Begi, Mazhabi Sikh,Mehtar, Olgana, Zadmali, and others.
7	Mala	c. 5.5 million	Andhra Pradesh, Karnataka, Maharashtra, Puducherry, Tamil Nadu, Telangana	The largest Scheduled Caste community in Andhra Pradesh.
8	Dusadh	c. 5 million	Bihar, Jharkhand, Uttarakhand, Uttar Pradesh, West Bengal	Found predominately in Bihar. Also known as Paswan.
9	Dhobi	c. 4.3 million	Assam, Bihar, Chandigarh, Delhi, Jharkhand, Madhya Pradesh (only in Bhopal, Sehore and Raisen district), Manipur, Odisha, Rajasthan, Tripura, Uttar Pradesh, Uttarakhand, West Bengal	They are also known as Rajak. In other states, they have high population but are categorized under Other Backward Class.
10	Meghwal	c. 4.1 million	Delhi, Gujarat, Haryana, Himachal Pradesh, Jammu and Kashmir, Karnataka, Madhya Pradesh, Maharashtra, Punjab	The largest Scheduled caste community in Rajasthan. Counted with sub-castes such as Julaha, Kabirpanthi, Megh, Menghvar, and others.
