= Adi movement =

Adi movement may refer to the following Dalit movements:

- Adi Dravida, active in Tamil Nadu
- Adi Andhra, active in Andhra Pradesh
- Adi Karnataka, active in Karnataka
- Adi Dharma, active in Punjab
- Adi Hindu, active in Uttar Pradesh
