= Bangalore Tamil dialects =

Dialect of Tamil

Tamil is the second most spoken language, after Kannada in the city of Bangalore in Karnataka, India, having established itself as a notable dialect of Tamil. There are three main dialects of Tamil spoken in Bangalore – the Tigala dialect, Bhovi dialect, and the Brahmin Iyer/Iyengar dialect. The differences between Bangalore Tamil and standard Tamil, though numerous, do not affect understandability between speakers of the opposing dialects. Amongst the three dialects, the Iyer/Iyengar dialect shows a higher degree of difference from standard Tamil due to the retention of numerous Sanskrit words (but its influence has very rapidly affected the other two dialects of Tamil, which have quickly taken on linguistic similarities). Likewise, the majority of people from this demographic had relocated to Karnataka far prior to recent times, having moved due to land grants from the once prospering Mysore kingdom. Religious influence from Hinduism coupled with the usage of an older Tamil also occurred (which had developed independently from standard Tamil, leading to it not undergoing the substantial decrease in Sanskrit usage due to the Dravidar Kazhagam movement). These speakers are considered multilingual and usually have full native-level grasp on both Kannada and Tamil.

While the insertion of Kannada words is not significant, it is relatively common for speakers of Bangalore Tamil to apply them in replacement of lengthier Tamil words for the sake of efficiency. One of the main differentiators between the 3 subsets of Bangalore Tamil, not only lies in the varying usage levels of Sanskrit vocabulary, but also pronunciation. The more sanskritized Tamil dialects will oftentimes mirror Malayalam and Kannada word pronunciations, with pronunciation of the full “u” at the end of words as well as Sanskrit words being pronounced more accurately despite there being a mismatch between the sound limitations of the written Tamil script and the spoken variant of Tamil. Thus, it can be inferred that speakers of this dialect will slightly alter the words (to more accurately reflect their originated pronunciations) read from Tamil instead of sounding them out exactly as written, specifically in regards to Kannada, Malayalam, or Sanskrit origin words that entered this brand of Tamil. In a sense, Bangalore Tamil, especially Iyer/Iyengar Tamil, can have similarities drawn between it and Malayalam, due to its nature as a new age Manipravalam (albeit with increased Kannada influence, clear usage of Tamil words, and slightly lessened Sanskrit influence compared to standard Manipravalam, which could oftentimes reach 50% Sanskrit usage).
