= Uttaranallur Nangai =

Tamil Female poet

Uttaranallur Nangai (Tamil: உத்தரநல்லூர் நங்கை) was a Tamil Paraiyar poet who lived in the 15th century CE. She is best known for her strong views against the caste and gender hierarchies of her time. As a Dalit herself, she passionately expresses these views in her only surviving work, the Paichalur Padigam.

== Biography ==
Her name, Uttaranallur Nangai, is a combination of Uttaranallur (her birthplace) and Nangai (meaning maiden). Being a Dalit and a woman, she was forbidden from studying the Vedas during her time. In spite of that, she studies the Vedas from a Brahmin boy in secret. Eventually, she falls in love with that Brahmin boy and marries him as well.

For her dual transgression of reading the forbidden sacred texts and breaking caste taboos, she was sentenced to death by being burned alive by the elders of the Paichalur village. When the elders came to the Paraiya street to carry out the sentence, she composed the work Paichalur Padigam addressing them. A verse from that work is quoted below:

Neem and sandalwood smell distinct when they burn,

But the smell of the burning Brahmin, you cannot tell.

Does fire smell different when the unwashed Pulaya¹ burns?

The stuff that burns and the flames that burn - how do they differ,

O elders of Paichalur?

— Poem 9, Paichalur Padigam

¹ Pulaya refers to a Dalit caste

சந்தனம் அகிலும் வேம்பும் தனித்தனிக் கந்தம் நாறும்

அந்தணர் தீயில் வீழ்ந்தால் அவர்மணம் வீசக் காணோம்

செந்தலை புலையன் வீழ்ந்தால் தீமணம் வேற தாமோ?

பந்தமும் தீயும் வேறோ பாய்ச்சலூர்க் கிராமத் தாரே!

— பாடல் 9, பாய்ச்சலூர் பதிகம்

== See also ==
- Bhakti movement
- Tamil literature
- Caste system
