= Gangaramji Dhuldhoye =

Indian dalit rights activist (1888 - 1973)

Gangaramji Dhuldhoye (1888 - 1973) was a Dalit rights activist and politician.

== Biography ==
Gangaramji Dhuldhoye was born about 1888 in Mhow in Indore district of Madhya Pradesh. He belonged to the Mochi community and his father Nanaji Dhuldhoye served in the British Indian Army. After leaving school, Gangaramji worked as a head fitter at Malwa Cotton Mill at Indore for almost 50 years.

Subsequently, he was engaged in social work and then started social upliftment work. In 1942 he joined the Scheduled Castes Federation and later in 1952 he joined Congress. In 1946 he participated into a satyagraha for the political rights of Dalits and was also imprisoned.

He started a school in Ravipura at Indore for Dalit students. He was also a musician, spread education through his gimmick to the people and did charity for upliftment of backward classes. He also worked with Dalit leaders like Shankarrao Mhasde and Sajjan Singh Vishnar and was active in trade unions and led the Dalit Mazdoor Kesan Union, Indore.

He married Moti Devi, with whom he had six sons. Gangaramji died at the age of 85 on 17 January 1973.
