= Dher =

Indian backward class and scheduled caste

Dher is one of the backward classes and scheduled castes of India.

In Southern India, among Dhers there were three principal class of slaves called Holeya, Yemaru and Paleru.
