= Jaggali =

Schedule caste of south India

chakali, Jakkali

Total population
- Andhra Pradesh - 695, Telangana - 2579, Odisha -5854, Karnataka - 12,411

Regions with significant populations
- Andhrapradesh, Odisha, Telagana, Karnataka

Languages
- Telugu, Oriya ,Kannada

Religion
- Hindu,Christian

Related ethnic groups
- Schedule Caste

The Jaggali people are a schedule caste in Andhra Pradesh, Telangana, Odissa, Karnataka, whose native language is Oriya and are mostly Hindu religious believers who speak Telugu. They have a very low status; most Hindus consider them to be inferior. The Hindu religious creation commission defined lower classes in as unclear a fashion as in origin. These castes seem to be partly functional, comprising those who followed occupations held to be unclean or demeaning, such as scavenging or leather working, and part of tribal, aboriginal tribes into the Hindu and transformed into an impure caste.

== History ==
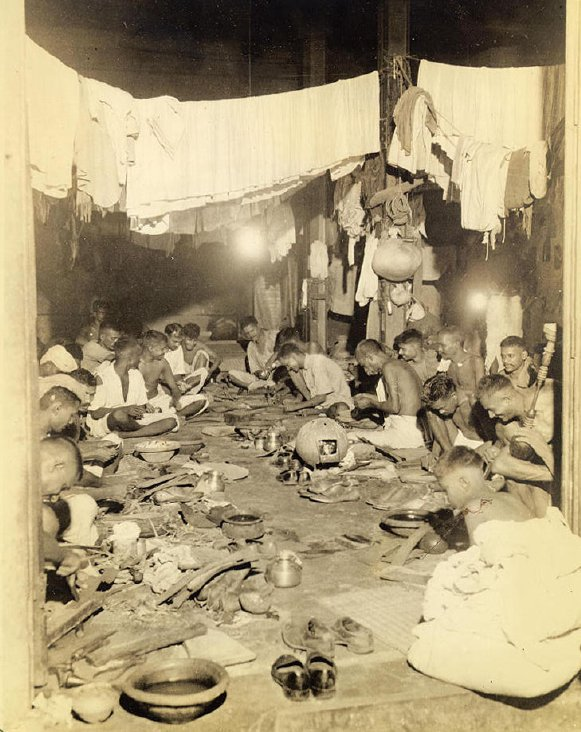
Shoemaking and laundry shop in Calcutta in 1945

India has thousands of communities and sub-communities that have been in existence and practice since the Vedic times. They were created to solve the type of work people belong to the Jaggali caste do or did in earlier times. The Jaggali community category of Shudra is the class that serves other upper community categories. Jaggali community is also known as Jaggali Gotra. Jaggali is the Sanskrit name (satkuzhi) for "one who eats too much meat" or "one who eats cattle meat". The community is also called Jaggali or Jakkali.

== Occupation ==
They are mainly Agricultural Labour, farm servants, beedi workers, and tendu leaf collectors. The leather workers of the Jaggali community were dependent on the Agricultural community for caresses to produce leather chappals.

== See also ==
- Chakkiliyan (sakkiliyar)
- List of Scheduled Castes in Andhra Pradesh and Telangana
- List of Scheduled Castes in Odisha
- Scheduled castes in Karnataka
