= Malavazhiyattam =

Indian folk dance

- Native name: മലവാഴിയാട്ടം (Malayalam)
- Genre: Indian folk dance
- Instrument(s): Chenda, Elathalam
- Origin: Kerala, India

Malavazhiyattam also known as Malavayiyattam Kariniliyattam or Cheruniliyattam is a ritualistic folk art of the Paraya community in Kerala, India. It is music and drama performed to please Malavazhi, a mother goddess worshiped by the Parayas and installed in their homes.

== Myth ==
During the Devasura war, the defeated devas took shelter of Lord Shiva. One of the Asuras shot an arrow at Shiva who was performing penance for the victory of the devas. Malavazhi and Mookan Chatan are siblings who emerged from the third eye of Lord Shiva, who opened his eyes in anger at the interruption of his penance. Malavazhi is also called Cherunili and Karineeli and Mookan Chatan is called Mani and Muthappan.

Karineeli and Mani, who went to the devaloka to find out who their father was, were chased away by the devas. They left devaloka and spent their childhood in Kalladikode Malavara, famous for ancient magic. Walking around there, once they met Shiva requested him to accept their paternity and show them the way of life. At first Shiva was not ready for that, but when they showed their divine power he accepted and blessed them as children. Later, they travel westward and after wandering around in different places in the country, they finally built a black fort and a cave with black stone at Kallatikod Karimala. After building a temple on the Kallatikotan hill, it is believed that these deities wandered all over Kerala, taking grain from a Pulaya woman of the Kuttadan field and bullocks from Kongan Chetti as vehicles for travel.

Another myth says that Malavazhi and Kalladi Muttappan, who are among the thirty-three crore sub-deities of Shiva and Parvati, were born to Shiva and Parvati. It is believed that the ancestors of the Chempath Vatiri clans of Valakkattupadam settled the deities in Pavaratti in Valakkattupadam.

It is also believed that Malavazhi or Malavarathamma is the presiding deity of Mala (the mountain) and she is the worship idol of all the Muthappans (a demigod). One can become a Muthappan only by serving Malavazhi and mastering mantras and illusions.

According to another popular myth Malavarathamma and Kalladi Muthappan were born to god Udipanath Udi Bhagavan's (also known as Nallachan) third eye. Goddess Muthi (Malavazhi) and Muthan, who bought the boons from Nallachchan, settled in a beautiful shrine in Tirumala, Kalladikode.

== Ritual dance drama ==
Malavazhiyattam is a ritualistic dance drama performed once a year by the Paraya community of Thrissur and Palakkad districts in Kerala, India. Malavazhi is the mother goddesses who are installed in the homes of the Parayas and worshiped by them. Malavazhiyattam is performed to please the deities through music and drama. It starts at night and continues till the next morning.

=== Character and costumes ===
There are two main characters namely Malavazhi and Mookan Chathan. Malavazhi is a female character and Mani or Mookan Chathan is male. In Malavazhiyattam ritual dance both have equal importance.

Malavazhi's costume in is characterized by a crown made of coconut leaves and a flower garland. While performing in the concept of Malavazhi, as a ritual the performer bites a chicken and drinks some drops of its blood.

Malavarathamma's form is described as wearing a sword in her right hand, a stick in her left hand, and silamb on her feet. Malavazhi has similarities to the characters in ritual dances like Karinkali and Thira of central Kerala. Red, black and white silk cloths are squeezed and a metallic waist ornament aramani is worn over it. Other ornaments include traditional breast ornaments like Marthali, Marvattom, and Mulakkut. On both sides of the ears, wooden ears are worn, metallic fang like tooth and traditional bracelets are also worn. In addition to the silk costume, peacock feather is also worn on the head. Face art is done with rice powder, turmeric powder and charcoal powder.

Mookan Chathan, the comic character, has a beard made of fibers (vanchis) and sometimes a mask (poymukha) on his face. He also wears red silk and wears aramani over it. There will be a bundle on the head and two sticks in the hand. If there is no mask then face arts are done with rice powder or turmeric powder. Mani's main job is to entertain the audience by singing songs that make them laugh. Mani's comedy and songs often give way to subtle social criticism.

=== Instruments ===
Leather percussion instruments like Chenda, small type of flute and an ancient instrument known as maram is used in Malavazhiyattam. Metallic instrument Elathalam is also used. The player keep the chenda tilted and strike the left and right sides alternately.
