= Valluvar (caste) =

Indian caste

Valluvar is a caste associated with the Indian state of Tamil Nadu. They are the hereditary priests of the Pallars and Paraiyars of Tamil Nadu.

== Origin ==
Valluvars are believed to have been the priests of the Pallava kings before the introduction of Brahmins and for sometime after their arrival. The exalted position of Valluvars in the social hierarchy during those times is indicated by inscriptions which refer to Valluvars in a respectful manner. Moreover, the Tamil saint Thiruvalluvar is believed to have been a member of this community and there is a subsect of Valluvars claiming descent from him. The Valluvars are also called Pandaram or Valluva Pandaram. The priests of the Valluvars are sometimes called Vellala Pandaram, Thiruvalluva Nayanar.

== Culture and practices ==
Owing to their occupation as priests, all males over twelve wore the sacred thread. The Valluvars were also noted for their abstinence from beef.

Valluvars were an untouchable caste.

Valluvars follow both Saivism and Vaishnavism. Saivite and Vaishnavite Valluvars dine together, but not intermarry. A particular class of Valluvars officiated as priest at Paraiyar funerals. This particular class of Valluvars was known as Paraiya Tadas and were regarded as inferior by other sections of Valluvars. Another section of Valluvars wear a necklace of tulsi beads and are known as Alvar Dasari or Tavadadhari. The affairs of the community are handled by a caste-council. The community is headed by a Kolkaran or a Kanakkan. There are the hereditary astrologers of the Indian temple town of Vaithiswaran Koil and are considered experts in Nadi astrology.

The Valluvars generally officiate in Paraiyar marriages and funerals. During such occasions, Valluvar priests used to chant Sanskrit shlokas.

== Notable people ==
- Thiruvalluvar
