= Thoti =

The Thoti are one of the endogamous and isolated community of India, who are recognized as Scheduled Tribes in Telangana. They are recognized as Scheduled Castes in Karnataka and Kerala. The Thoti live in Telangana, primarily in Adilabad district, Warangal district, Nizamabad district and Karimnagar district.

In the 1991 census of India, 3,654 Thoti were reported. In the 2001 census, the figure for Thoti was 2,074. The Thoti speak a dialect of the Gondi language.

== Sources ==
- http://www.aptribes.gov.in/html/tcr-studies-eci-thotis.htm
- document on Scheduled Tribes in Andhra Pradesh
