= Koravar =

Tribes of Tamil Nadu

The Korava are a tribe in Tamil Nadu, India.

== Ethnonym ==
People of this community are called by different names in different parts of South India. They are called Yerukula in Andhra Pradesh (derived from the tradition of fortune telling by the women), Korama, Korachas in Karnataka, Kaikadi in Maharashtra, and Sidanar in Kerala.

== Caste politics ==
In 2006 the Koravar applied to gain Scheduled Tribe status.
