= Vankar =

Weaving communities of Western India

- વણકર
- Religions: Hinduism
- Country: India
- Historical grouping: Meghwal
- Disputed grouping: Dhedh, Mahyavanshi
- Status: Scheduled Castes
- Reservation (Education): yes
- Reservation (Employment): yes

Vankar (also known as Wankar or Vaniya) are weaving and cloth trading communities of Western India. They produce clothes of cotton, silk, khadi and linen. Though, majority of these community members in present times are not engaged in their ancestral weaving occupation, still some population of these communities contribute to the traditional handloom weaving work.

Vankar is described as a caste as well as a community and are recognized as Scheduled Castes as part of affirmative action in India.

== History ==
A block printed and resist-dyed fabric, whose origin is from Gujarat was found in the tombs of Fostat, Egypt. Indian textiles especially of Gujarat have been praised in several accounts by explorers and historians, from Megasthenes to Herodotus. Marco Polo a Venetian merchant on his visit to India in 13th century Gujarat observed that "brocading art of Gujarat weavers is par excellent". During Mughal Empire India was manufacturing 27% of world's textile and Gujarati weavers dominated along with Bengali weavers in Indian textile trade industry overseas. Even the archaeological surveys and studies have indicated that the people of Dholavira, Surkotada. Kuntasi, Lothal and Somnath of Gujarat regions in Harrapan civilization were familiar with weaving and the spinning of cotton for as long as four thousand years ago. Reference to weaving and spinning materials is found in the Vedic Literature.

As weaving is an art and forms one of the most important artisan community of India. Since Vankars were involved in production and business they were known as Nana Mahajans or small merchants. They have been grouped in Vaishya category of Varna system.

=== 18th-19th century ===
Britain's Industrial Revolution was built on the de-industrialisation of India - the destruction of Indian textiles and their replacement by manufacturing in England, using Indian raw materials and exporting the finished products back to India and even the rest of the world. The handloom weavers of Gujarat, Maharastra and Bengal produced and exported some of the world's most desirable fabrics. Britain's response was to cut off the thumbs of weavers, break their looms and impose duties on tariffs on Indian cloth, while flooding India and the world with cheaper fabric from the new steam mills of Britain. The arrival of the East India Company, however sounded the death knell for the Indian textile industry. The weavers were forced into selling exclusively to the British at extremely low rates, pushing them into poverty.

=== 20th century ===
The freedom struggle brought the Indian handloom sector back to the fore, with Mahatma Gandhi spearheading the Swadeshi cause. In no other nation has something as basic as one's clothing or an act as simple as spinning cotton become so intertwined with a national movement. The humble Charkha (spinning wheel) and khadi became a dominant symbol of self-reliance, self-determination and nationalist pride.

== Occupation ==
The main occupation of Vankars was the weaving of cloth. Since after expansion of British textile markets and decline of Indian textile industry Vankars suffered a lot. Hence they started farming and small-scale business in the British Raj to thrive better conditions ahead to maintain their livelihood.

== See also ==
- Meghwal people
- Balai Bunkar
