= Bhovi =

Community in Karnataka, India

The Bhovi are a community in the region of the present-day state of Karnataka. They are also referred to as Bovi, Bayyar, Bhoyi and Bhoi. L Historically, members of the Bhovi community were considered socially and economically disadvantaged and were primarily engaged in occupations such as palanquin carrying and agricultural labor around 200 years ago.

== Etymology ==
The word Bhovi is thought to derive from a king named Bhovi, who ruled over a region in southeastern India in medieval times. The etymology suggests that the community migrated to their current location from Eastern India. During the course of their migration, they picked up several local languages en route. Members of the community can therefore speak various languages such as Telugu, Kannada, Tamil, Marathi and Gujarati.

There are members of the community in Pakistan as well, with many of the Hindus from the community migrating to India. In January 2020, about 5000 members of the community, who had faced religious persecution in Pakistan and fled the country, held a rally in New Delhi supporting the Citizenship (Amendment) Act, 2019.

== History ==
The Bhovi community has been involved in the construction of stone art and architecture, water fountains and roads. Some heritage sites in Karnataka were constructed by skilled workers from the community, who used to work as builders and sculptors. During the Vijayanagara Empire, their skills in these fields were highly respected. In 2019, when large parts of Karnataka faced droughts, the community were the predominant group employed in digging wells.

The Bhovis fall under the list of Scheduled Castes in Karnataka. Members of other scheduled castes in Karnataka have protested the inclusion of the Bhovis in the list, claiming that the Bhovis are not "backward" enough to merit inclusion.

== Culture ==
Bhovi women play a significant role in the economic, social and religious spheres of their community and contribute to the family income. While architecture and geology are their traditional and primary occupations, agriculture is the secondary occupation for those settled in villages. Their village councils consist of elderly men, with women given limited powers.

The patron deity of the Bhovi is Shiva in the form of Eshwara and Muneshwara. Many members of the community are also devotees of Anjaneya. The community also worships the earth as a deity, and through this, are said to have been blessed with wonderful skills to work the earth, a reference to their stone-cutting and well-digging activities. Members of the community also worship various local goddesses in the regions they have settled in.

== Demographics ==
They are the third largest Scheduled castes in Karnataka with a population of 11,19,315, as per the 2011 census of India. They are categorized under Group C as per the Karnataka Government's Scheduled Castes sub-classification.
