= Chalavadi =

Regions with significant populations
- Karnataka, India

Languages
- Kannada

Religion
- Hinduism

Chalavādi (Māla, Chalawadi, Chalwadi, Chelvadi, Chelavadi) is a Dravida community, mainly belonging to Karnataka, "who are generally called formerly as Adi Dravida (Balagai), Channaiah or Channayya"(Bidar, Belgaum, Bijapur and Dharwad districts), Toti, Byagara, Whalliaru or Whallias, Holia's or Mahar (Belgaum side) (Synonym's: Holar) is the servant of the right-hand, or eighteen-caste section of the community, and the custodian of its symbol, namely, the bell and the ladle (Gandadabatlu). These are made of brass and are connected together by a chain of the same metal, and sometimes they are placed before Sangameshwara gaddige and Pūjā made to them. The members use, among themselves, the term Balagai as they are classified among the eighteen castes that form the right-hand section of the community in Dravida countries. Chalavadis are well dressed and stands with a blanket under his arm. He carries a brass image of Shiva seated on a bull. The image is overshadowed by the hood of a snake and is fixed to the upper end of a brass spoon. A brass bell hangs from the handle of the spoon to the Chelvadi’s knee in front. From time to time, the Chelvadi sings hymns in honour of Shiva and rings the bell.

== Origin ==
Chalvadi is said to be a disciple of Basava. They came with the Maharaja of the Vijayanagar empire and settled in different districts. They are considered as the right-hand caste as opposed to the left-hand who are the Madars or Madiga.

Chalavadi's were agricultural labourers during the 17th century to 18th century and were divided into Kuliyalugalu (hired labourer's) and Muladalugalu or Mulada Holeya (hereditary serfs) depending on nature of employment in agrarian society.

== Subdivision ==
=== Karnataka ===
The important sections of Holeyas were the Pombada (Bhuta dancers), the Bakuda or Mundala, the Holeya or Mari Holeya, the Koragar (basket maker) & Nalke (Bhuta Dancers). but only Holeya or Mari Holeya considered Chalavadis, not others.
