= Holeya =

Scheduled caste of India

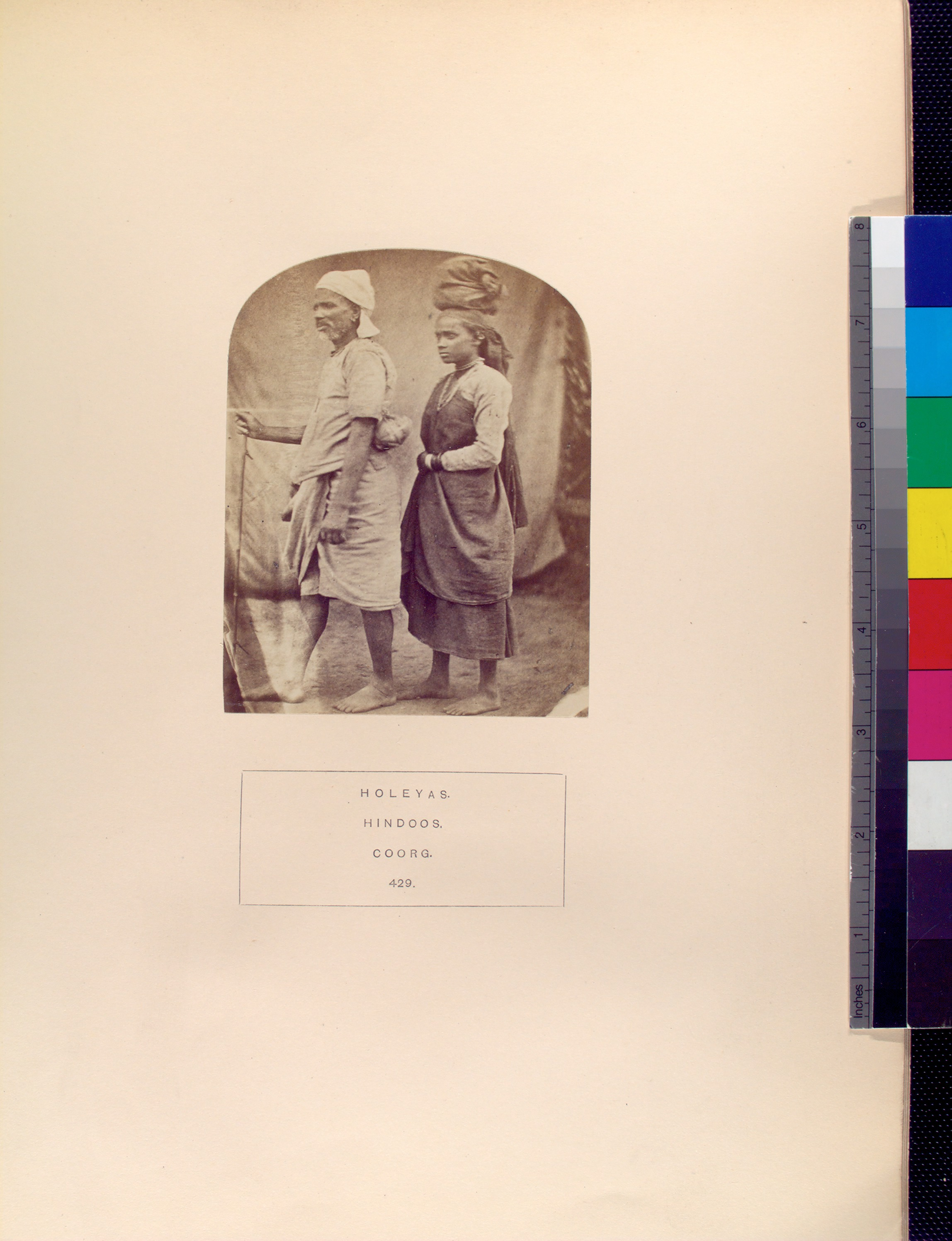
- A Holeya couple in Coorg.

Languages
- Kannada, Telugu, Tulu

Religion
- Hinduism, Navayana

Related ethnic groups
- Chalavadi

Holeya are a scheduled caste of India, mainly belonging to present day Karnataka State, Kerala, Maharashtra, Tamil Nadu and also Madhya Pradesh.

The Mysore Gazetteer claimed the Holeyas were the first to settle the villages. In Medieval period of India's history, they were the warrior classes of fallen Kingdoms, hence were made & treated as, out-caste, commonly an agricultural labor. The term Hola means an agricultural field and the term Holeya is derived from Hola. Other colonial-era authors claimed it derived also from Hole, meaning "pollution."

In British India, Holeyas lived in Canara, Coorg Province and Mysore. They were one of the lowest class, a partial slave, who could be sold by the owner of the estate in which they were located.

Holeya community is one of the oldest communities in the subcontinent, with mentions of the community name in Ashoka's Gavi Mut Inscription of Koppal, and Halmidi Inscription in Halmidi, Hassan. They are said to be the oldest agricultural community of the state and are said to be the source of numerous kingdoms in the Deccan. In medieval history, they was considered to be a sub-division of Dher, and among Dhers there were three principal class of slaves called Holiyas, Yemaru and Paleru.

Holeya is also known by the name of Paraiyar in some areas. The old Tamil poems and early Christian writing do not mention the word Pariah or Paraiyan but mention the name of a tribe called Eyninas, who were quite distinct from the rest of people and did not live in villages, but in forts of their own. Mr Francis, a historian, regards them as ancestors of present-day Holeyas.
