= Dasari (caste) =

Vaishnava mendicant caste in Telangana and Andhra Pradesh, India

- Religions: Hinduism
- Languages: Telugu
- Populated states: Andhra Pradesh Telangana

Dasari is a Vaishnava mendicant caste in Telangana region and Andhra Pradesh, India. They are involved in various business, trades, and agriculture. They are part of Gowda (Goud) community.

The history of Dasari caste dates back to centuries.

== See also ==
- List of Telugu castes
