= Muchis =

The Muchis (Bengali: মুচি) are a Bengali Hindu scheduled caste found in the Indian state of West Bengal, Assam, Tripura and Bangladesh. They are traditionally engaged in shoe making, repairing and shoe shining profession.

The Muchis numbered 995,756 in the 2001 census and were 5.4 per cent of the scheduled caste population of West Bengal. 47.0 per cent of the Muchis were literate – 58.6 per cent males and 34.1 per cent females were literate.
