= Adi Karnataka =

Group of people in Karnataka, India

Adi Karnataka, often referred as "original people of region", is a term used for homogenous group of people in Karnataka who were warriors and rulers (Balgai) while some of them were agriculturalists and labourers (which are now known as Edgai). They were considered as the Kshatriyas.

== History ==
In the mid-1830s, a British traveller named Kristopher Fellowman did considerable research on the community which is also called 'Samantha' and 'Moola Kannadiga Kula' referring them as "once belonging to Kshatriya Kula which were called Samanta or Moolakanadiga Kula (original people of Karnataka)". They have been described as a service-oriented group, with women wearing sari and blouses and men wearing headgear with towels.

The Samanthas divided their roles and responsibilities into 'Edgai' and 'Balgai' sub-groups, which translated as left and right hands, respectively. While the Balgais comprised monarchs and administrators, the Edgais (or artisans) were made responsible for work like farming, hunting and state security.

== Present day ==
They are the largest Scheduled Caste community in Karnataka with a population of 29,20,942 as per 2011 census, primarily concentrated in Southern Karnataka. As per the Government of Karnataka, they are considered as 'Balagai' (or right-hand Dalit group), along with Holeya.

== See also ==
- Caste system in India
