= Dhor (caste) =

Dalit caste of India

The Dhor, also known as Kankkaya refers to a specific subgroup within the broader Chamar (leatherworker) caste, primarily located in Maharashtra, Karnataka and parts of Gujarat. They have been referred as separate community and recognized as Scheduled Castes under Indian government policy of affirmative action.

== Culture and Society ==
The Dhor community in Maharashtra follow Hinduism and Lingayat sect. They also revere Bhakti Sant Rohidas and Shiva's disciple Saint Kakkayya. The origin of the Dhor lies in the Marathi caste Chambhar and in the traditionally Dhor caste associated with leather-related occupations such as tanning raw leather, shoe making, and manufacturing of other leather-related products. To uplift and improve the trading skills of the Dhor Charamkar community, the government of Maharashtra set up Sant Rohidas Leather Industries & Charmakar Development Corporation Ltd. (LIDCOM).

The members of community has been historical associated with leatherwork and been placed at the bottom of the caste hierarchy, with historically facing significant social discrimination. Like many Dalit communities, the Dhor have endured untouchability, economic marginalisation, and social exclusion.

== Demography ==
According to the book named India: Caste, Culture, and Traditions, the population of the Dhor caste in Maharashtra and Karnataka is 68,509 and 22,432, (in 1941) respectively. As per 2011 census of India, they are fifth largest Scheduled Caste community in Maharashtra with a population of 1,16,287.

== Notable people ==
- Sushilkumar Shinde - Former Chief Minister of Maharashtra.

== See also ==
- Marathi people
- Ravidas
- Chamar
- Chambhar
- Ravidassia
