= Mochi (Hindu) =

Hindu caste found mainly in North India

Regions with significant populations
- • India • Bangladesh

Languages
- • Bengali• Braj Bhasha • Hindi• Bhojpuri

Religion
- Hinduism

Related ethnic groups
- Muslim Mochi, Sikh Mochi

The Mochi are a Hindu caste found mainly in North India. They are the traditional shoemakers of South Asia.

== Present circumstances ==
In Gujarat, the Mochi caste is categorised as OBC in Bakshi Panch.

The Mochi are involved in the manufacture of leather shoes. The community has a traditional caste council, as is common among many North Indian artisan communities. This caste council acts as an instrument of social control, by punishing those who contravene community norms. Each caste council is headed by a Chaudhary, a position that tends to be hereditary. The Mochi live in multi-caste villages, but occupy their own distinct quarters.

The Mochi of Haryana claim to have migrated from Rajasthan, and are found mainly in the cantonment city of Ambala. They still speak the Braj Bhasha dialect. They are strictly endogamous, and practice clan exogamy. Their traditional occupation was shoe making, but with the spread of factory manufactured shoes it has declined. A large number are landless agricultural labourers, with a minority now taking up other professions. They are assigned as scheduled caste and supported by affirmative action.

== Mochi of Punjab ==
The Mochi in rural Punjab in Pakistan is still dependent on the local landlord, who acts as patron. Often, the Mochi does not own his property, but rents from the landlord. The Mochi is thus entirely dependent on the locally dominant caste, and are paid from each cash crop at the end of the harvesting season according to a system called seypi.
