= Garodi =

Muslim community in India

The Garodi are a nomadic Muslim community found in the state of Maharashtra in India. They are also known as Sampagarudi, Madari Baorikar and Gare.
