= Beda Jangam =

Performer community of South India

Beda Jangam or Budga Jangam are street performer community in Karnataka, who traditionally followed nomadic lifestyle. They used to work as beggars and performers with no fixed livelihoods, with few working as priests for untouchable communities. They are recognized as Scheduled Castes in Karnataka, Maharashtra and Telangana.

They are primarily found in Southern region of Karnataka with a population of 1,17,164 as of 2011. In Telangana, they are found in the Northern West region in the districts of Hyderabad, Ranga Reddy, Adilabad districts.

They have been confused with the Jangams, who are the Lingayat priest community that has led to the protest of clubbing them with different community. Due to the issue of misconception of the Budga Jangam and Lingayat Jangam over the classification of the both communities are same, despite distinct culture and traditional practices. The community has raised concerns of misutilization of affirmative policies of Lingayat Jangams as both communities claims of being Scheduled Castes.
