= Lal Begi =

Dalit community in India

The Lal Begi, also called Lalbegi or Lala Baig, are a Chuhra caste found in the states of Bihar and Uttar Pradesh in India, as well as in Multan, Dera Ghazi Khan and Bahawalpur districts of Punjab province in Pakistan. Mirza Imam Deen of Qadian, Gurdaspur, Punjab, India was the spiritual leader of Lalbegi/ Balmikis.

== Present circumstances ==
The Lal Begi Scheduled Caste population in Uttar Pradesh at the 2011 Census of India was 560.
