= Holar caste =

Dalit Hindu caste

Holar
- Classification: SC
- Religions: Hinduism
- Languages: Marathi
- Country: India
- Populated states: Majority: Maharashtra; Minority: Gujarat; Karnataka; Madhya Pradesh

Holar is a small Marathi community or caste found in the Indian states of Maharashtra, Karnataka, Gujarat and Madhya Pradesh. The caste traditionally provides music and plays at weddings and other festivities.
