= Halalkhor =

Dalit community in India

Halalkhor are a Dalit Muslim community, found in the states of Bihar and Uttar Pradesh in India. The Halalkhor are also known as Shaikhra or Shahani in Bihar and Muslim Bhangi and in Uttar Pradesh.

== History and origin ==
The word halal khor is from Persian حلال‌خور and literally means those who eat halal food. The community is traditionally associated with mazdoori and are descended from the Hindu Bhangi community who converted to Islam. Initially they were Sunnis, but are believed to have converted to the Shia sect in the 18th century. In some states in North India, they have backward caste status. They are divided into two sub-groups, the Kampu and Shaikada. The community is found throughout Uttar Pradesh, and speaks various dialects of Hindi such as Awadhi.

The Halalkhor of Bihar are Muslim sweepers, and are also known as Mehtar, Bhangi, and Halalbegi. They are found throughout Bihar, and speak a number of dialects. According to traditions, they are Muslim converts from the Hindu Bhangi caste. The Halalkhors of Bihar are split on sectarian lines between Shia and Sunni. There is no intermarriage between these two sects. Many Halalkhor in Bihar are employed as sweepers by the various municipalities in Bihar. Many have also emigrated to Mumbai and Kolkata, where they are employed as day labourers.

The Halalkhor often face discrimination from the other Muslim castes, and are one of the most marginalized Muslim group in Uttar Pradesh. Like other communities, they have a traditional caste council, known as the biradari panchayat. This caste council is involved in resolving disputes within the community. There are now growing demands for the community to be granted Scheduled Caste status, which is currently restricted to Hindu Dalits only.

== See also ==
- Muslim Shaikh
- Shah Khel
- Bhangi
