= Adi Dravida =

Term for natives of Southern India

Regions with significant populations
- c. 8.3 million (2011 census)
- Tamil Nadu: 7,242,172
- Puducherry: 145,231
- Karnataka: 795,620
- Kerala: 4,272
- Andhra Pradesh: 265,438
- Telangana: 651

Languages
- Tamil

Religion
- Hinduism, Buddhism, Jainism, Islam, Christianity

Related ethnic groups
- Paraiyar

Adi Dravida (or Adi Dravidar) is a term that has been used since 1914 in South India to denote Paraiyars, a caste group. At the time of the 2011 Census of India, they made up about half of Tamil Nadu's Scheduled Caste population.

== Origin ==
Iyothee Thass, a leader of the Paraiyar community, believed that the term "Paraiyar" was a slur. He attempted a reconstruction of Tamil history, arguing that the Paraiyars were the original inhabitants of the land, who had been subjugated by upper-caste invaders. Another Paraiyar leader, Rettamalai Srinivasan, however, advocated using the term "Paraiyar" with pride, and formed the Parayar Mahajana Sabha ("Paraiyar Mahajana Assembly") in 1892. Thass, on the other hand, advocated the term "Adi-Dravida" ("Original Dravidians") to describe the community. In 1892, he used the term Adidravida Jana Sabhai to describe an organisation, which was probably Srinivasan's Parayar Mahajana Sabha. In 1895, he established the "People’s Assembly of Urdravidians" (Adidravida Jana Sabha), which probably split off from Srinivasan's organisation. According to Michael Bergunder, Thass was thus the first person to introduce the concept of "Adi Dravida" into political discussion.

In 1918, the Adi Dravida Mahajan Sabha also requested the Indian government use the term to replace the current but pejorative term "Pariah" (Paraiyar) used for the community.

Another Paraiyar leader, M C Rajah — a Madras councillor — made successful efforts for adoption of the term "Adi-Dravidar" in the government records. In 1914, the Madras Legislative Council passed a resolution that officially censured the usage of the term "Paraiyar" to refer to a specific community, and recommended "Adi Dravidar" as an alternative. In the 1920s and 1930s, Periyar ensured the wider dissemination of the term "Adi Dravida".

== Reservation ==
In South India, Adi Dravida are considered as Scheduled Castes, under India's positive system of Reservation.

Status	Notes	Reservation status	Ref.
Andhra Pradesh	mostly concentrated in bordering districts of Andhra Pradesh to Tamil Nadu	SC	
Lakshadweep	only the native citizens	ST	
Karnataka	Counted along with Adi Andhra, Adi Karnataka and Ajila.	SC	
Kerala	Counted along with Adi Andhra, Adi Karnataka and Ajila.	SC	
Tamil Nadu	Counted along with Adi Andhra, Adi Karnataka and Ajila.	SC	
