= Meghwal people =

People of northwest India and Pakistan

Meghwal
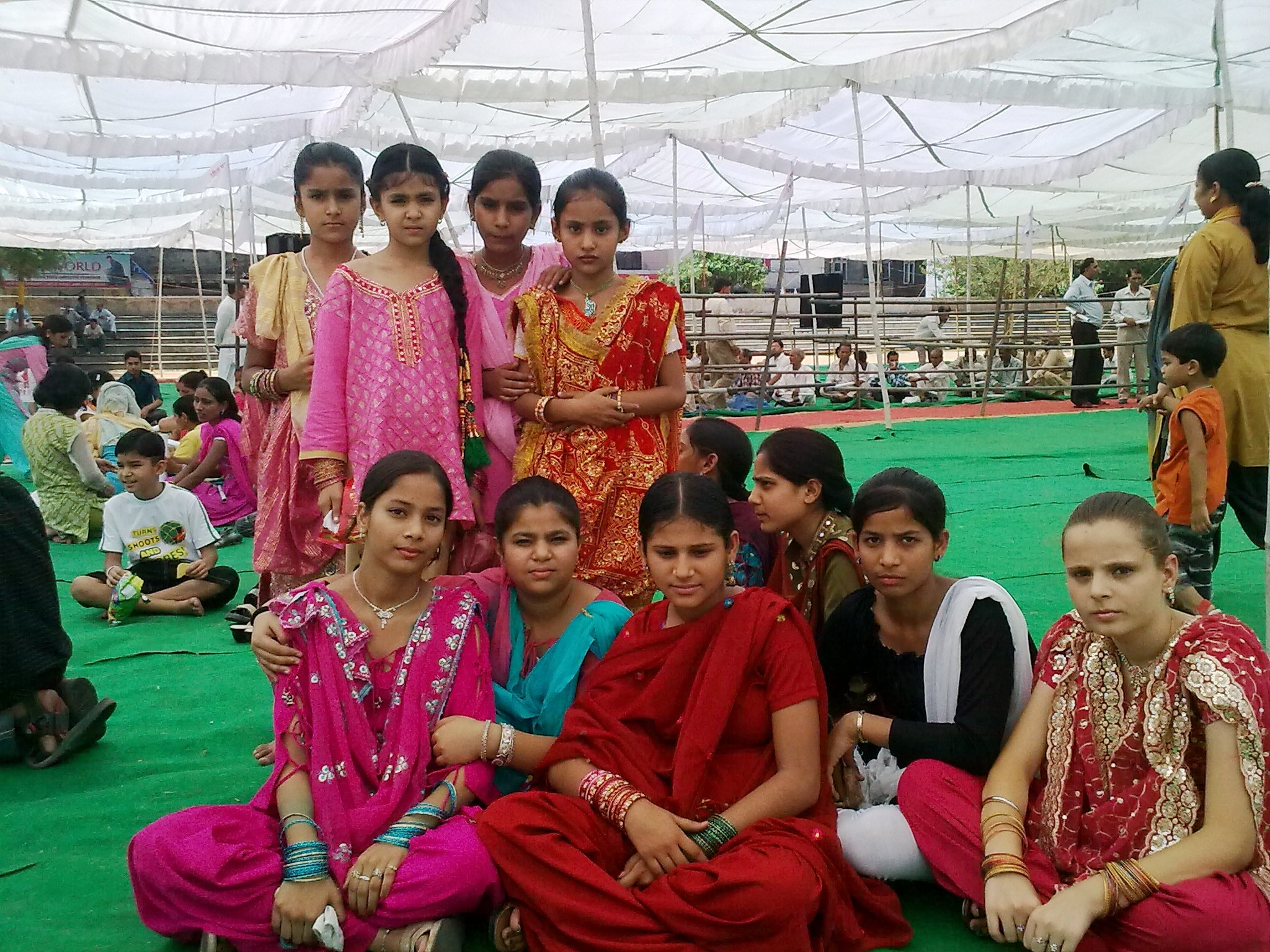
- A group of Megh girls in Jammu, India

Regions with significant populations
- • India • Pakistan

Religion
- •Hinduism •Buddhism (Navayana)

The Meghwal or Meghwar (also known as Megh and Meghraj) people live primarily in northwest India, with a small population in Pakistan. Their traditional occupation was agricultural farming, cattle-herding and weaving. Meghwals are known for their contribution to embroidery and the textile industry. Most are Hindu by religion, with Rishi Megh, Kabir, Ramdev Pir and Bankar Mataji as their chief gods.

== Synonyms ==
The Meghwal community is known by various names, depending on location. Examples include Balai, Menghwar. The community is also known by the neutral term Bhambhi as well as Dhed, considered derogatory.

== Origins ==
They claim to have descended from Rishi Megh, a saint who had the power to bring rain from the clouds through his prayer. The word Meghwar is derived from the Sanskrit words megh, meaning clouds and rain, and war (Hindi: वार), meaning a group, son and child. (Sanskrit: वार:)

However, it is theorized that at the time of Muslim invasion of India, many people of high castes including Rajputs, Charans, Brahmins, and Jats joined or were recruited in the Bhambhi or Meghwal caste. Due to this, there came 5 main divisions in the community:

1. Adu or unmixed Bhambis,
2. Maru Bhambis comprising Rajputs,
3. Charaniya Bhambis including Charanas,
4. Bamnia Bhambis comprising Paliwal Brahmins
5. Jata Bhambis including Jats

Some Meghwals are associated with other social groups. Shyam Lal Rawat refers to the Meghwals of Rajasthan as "one of the dominating backward castes ...", a connection also made by Debashis Debnath. The Balali and Bunkar communities have also begun using the Meghwal name.

== Culture ==
There exists cultural differences among these sub-caste groups of Meghwal. For example: the Meghwal like Jata Bhambis, Bamnia Bhambis and Charania Bhambis in Rajasthan do not inter marry within other sub-castes. These sub-groups being more conscious about their previous identities maintain their old customs and traditions.

Furthermore, there were also considerable diversity in dressing habits between different sub-groups. In 1891, when Hardyal Singh wrote about the Bhambi, Meghwal caste of Marwar states, he observed:

"The first two divisions (The Adu or unmixed Bhambis and the Maru Bhambis) are very closely connected and inter-marry, while the last two divisions only marry in their own communities respectively. The Bhambis are not allowed to wear gold and silver ornaments, but an exception is made in the case of head village Bhambi and his wife. There is striking popularity in the dress of men, but the Maru Bhambi women generally wear Ghagra or petticoat of country chintz, while the Jata Bhambis dress themselves like the Jat women and are distinguished from the use of lac churas instead of ivory ones. The women of the Charania Bhambis wear a dress of yellow colour like the Charan women."

In Gujarat, except the Maheshwari Meghwals, Marwada, Gujara and Charaniya sub-sections of Meghwals worship the Mata. Moreover, the Marwada and Gujara Meghwals, in contrast to the Charaniya Meghwals, hold great reverence for the saint Ramdev Puri. Unlike the Maheshwari Meghwals, the Marwada Meghwals possess the chori or marriage altar. While the Charaniya Meghwals abstain from the traditional skinning and tanning activities of Meghwals, the other groups do not exhibit specific objections to engaging in such tasks.

== Geographical distribution ==
The Meghwal are found in Gujarat, Madhya Pradesh, Maharashtra and Rajasthan. The Meghs, Kabir Panthi or Bhagat are from Himachal Pradesh and Jammu and Kashmir and are known as Megh, Arya Megh and Bhagat. In some places they are known as Ganeshia, Meghbansi, Mihagh, Rakhesar, Rakhia, Rikhia, Rishia and other names. Some of the Mahashas also claim to be belonging to Meghs. After Partition of India in 1947, the Meghs who had become converts to the Hinduism, had to migrate to Indian territory.

As of 1991, the population of Meghs in Punjab (India) was estimated at 105,157.

== Lifestyle ==
In the countryside of Rajasthan, many of the people of this community still reside in small hamlets of round, mud-brick huts painted on the outside with colourful geometric designs and decorated with detailed mirror inlays. In earlier days the main occupation of the Meghwal community was agricultural labour, weaving, specially Khadi and woodcarving, and these are still the main occupations. The women are famous for their embroidery work and are master wool and cotton weavers.

Increasing numbers of the Meghwal today are educated and are obtaining government jobs. In Punjab, especially in the cities like Amritsar, Jalandhar and Ludhiana a good number of them is engaged as workers in factories producing sports, hosiery, surgical and metal goods. Very few of them have their own business or a small scale industry. Tiny business and service units are their main support for livelihood.

== Arts ==
The Meghwal women in Rajasthan are known for their exuberantly detailed costumes and jewellery. Married women often wear gold nose ring, earrings and neckpieces, given as a "bride wealth" dowry by her soon-to-be husband's mother. Nose rings and earrings are often decorated with precious stones of ruby, sapphire and emerald. The Meghwal women's embroidery is sought after. Their work is distinguished by their primary use of red, which comes from a local pigment produced from crushed insects. The Meghwal women artisans of Thar desert in Sindh and Balochistan, and in Gujarat are considered masters of the traditional embroidery and Ralli making. Exotic hand-embroidered items are a part of the dowry of Meghwal woman.

== See also ==
- Balai
- Kolhi
