= Indian independence movement in Tamil Nadu =

The Indian independence movement had a long history in the Tamil-speaking districts of the Madras Presidency since the 18th century.

The first resistance to the British was offered by the legendary rebellions by the polygars such as the Puli Thevar, Veeramangai Velu Nachiyar, Muthu Vaduganatha Periyavudaya Thevar, Ondiveeran, Dheeran Chinamalai Marudu brothers, Veerapandiya Kattabomman, Veeran Sundaralingam, Oomaithurai, Maveeran Alagumuthu Kone , Chinna Alagumuthu Kone and the sepoys of Vellore. There were no violent rebellions in the 19th century, but there was continuous agitation by Indian independence activists such as Gazulu Lakshminarasu Chetty, John Bruce Norton, Eardley Norton, Sir T. Muthuswamy Iyer, P. Rangaiah Naidu, G. Subramania Iyer, Sir S. Subramania Iyer, C. Jambulingam Mudaliar, Salem Ramaswami Mudaliar, S. Ramaswami Mudaliar, T. M. Jambulingam Mudaliar, Tiruppur Kumaran, M. Veeraraghavachariar and C. Karunakara Menon. After a brief interlude of militancy in the early 1900s, independence activists from Tamil Nadu adopted the non-violent principles of Mahatma Gandhi. Some of the important Gandhian leaders of the region were C. Rajagopalachari, K. Kamaraj and S. Satyamurti.

Contemporaneous with the Indian nationalist movement, there were also pro-British political parties and movements, the most prominent being the Justice Party. Some important pro-British leaders were P. Theagaroya Chetty, V. S. Srinivasa Sastri and Raja of Panagal.

== Early contacts with European powers ==
European travellers and traders have had contacts with Tamil Nadu since at least the 1st millennium.

== Origin and rise of the British East India Company ==
Following the negotiations which Sir Thomas Roe had with Mughal Emperor Jahangir on behalf of James VI of Scotland and I of England, the British East India Company, founded by a charter in 1600, opened factories or trading posts all over India. The Masulipatnam factory, the first in the south, was opened in 1612. Later factories were established at Pulicat and Armagon. In 1639, harsh weather conditions caused the Masulipatnam factory to be moved to a site that had been newly purchased from the Raja of Chandragiri. A planned administrative base, a fort and a few British residences were set up. The city of Madras, which grew from the new settlement, thus became the first British trading settlement to be established in Tamil Nadu. The agency of Fort St George was set up in 1640 and upgraded to a presidency in 1652 but was demoted in 1655 before it was upgraded once again in 1684.

In the initial years, the British in South India concentrated mainly on trade, not on territorial expansion. Hence, they rarely indulged in acts of military aggression. However, the rapid rise of French influence forced the British at Madras to interfere in local politics and to assert themselves in the region through negotiations, alliances or more forceful means. The French victory over the British and their conquest of Madras in 1746 compelled the British East India Company to set up a regular standing army though Madras was returned to the British three years later.

Eventually, the French were defeated in a long series of battles known as the Carnatic Wars, and their influence in India virtually disappeared with the fall of Pondicherry in 1774. Apart from eliminating the French, the Carnatic Wars also strengthened British prestige and influence in the region as they had set up military alliances with local princes in their bid to outmaneuver the French. One of the princes was the most important and powerful ruler in the Tamil country, the Nawab of the Carnatic, who became a debtor and eventually a pensioner of the British East India Company.

The first British possession in the Tamil Nadu,, apart from Madras, was Fort St David, near Cuddalore, which was established in 1690. The British acquired taxation rights over Chingleput district in 1763 and South Arcot in 1781. The two districts, along with the rest of the Carnatic Kingdom, came under complete British control in 1801. The Baramahals (Salem, Coimbatore and western Tamil Nadu) were ceded to the British by Tipu Sultan in 1793 after his defeat in the Third Mysore War while Tanjore was acquired from the Thanjavur Maratha ruler, Serfoji II, in 1799.

== Resistance to British expansion ==
Maveeran Alagumuthu Kone (1710–1757), from Kattalankulam, in Thoothukudi District, was an early freedom fighter against the British presence in Tamil Nadu. Born into a Konar family, he became a military leader in the town of Ettayapuram, and was defeated in battle there against the British and Maruthanayagam's forces. He was executed in 1757 by British troops after a fierce battle and was captured and executed. In his memory, the government of Tamil Nadu conducts a Pooja ceremony every year on 11 July. A documentary film based on his life was released in 2012.

After his death, the polygar of Avudyapuram in 1757 led a confederacy of Western polygar chieftains against the Nawab of Carnatic's right to levy taxes on them for the British. The British responded by appointing Muhammad Yusuf, the governor of Madurai and Tirunelveli, and entrusting to him the task of putting down the rebellion. Yusuf enlisted the support of the Eastern polygar chieftains and eventually succeeded in reducing the rebels. Later, however, Muhammad Yusuf, himself, rebelled against the British and was captured and executed. During the 1780s and the 1790s, Tamil chieftains like Dheeran Chinnamalai and the Maruthu Pandiyar brothers also fought along with Tipu Sultan against the British. The Marudu brothers defeated a powerful British force at Kollangudi, near Sivagangai, in April 1789, with Udhaya Perumal Gounder as chief commander.

Velu Nachiyar, one of the few rulers who regained her kingdom, ruled it for ten more years. She formed an army and sought an alliance with Gopala Nayaker and Hyder Ali with the aim of attacking the British, whom she successfully fought in 1780. When Velu Nachiyar found where the British stored their ammunition, she arranged a suicide attack. A faithful follower, Kuyili, doused herself in oil, set herself alight and walked into the storehouse. Velu Nachiyar formed a woman's army, the "udaiyaal", in honour of her adopted daughter, Udaiyaal, who died while she detonated a British arsenal.

In 1799, Kattabomman Nayak, the polygar of Panchalankurichi, revolted, along with his brother Oomadhurai and a few neighbouring polygars, against the British. After a few successful skirmishes, Panchalankurichi was eventually besieged by Company troops, and Kattabomman was defeated in a long pitched battle. Kattabomman and most of his allies were captured and hanged, and the fort of Panchalankurichi was levelled to the ground. However, the Maruthu Pandiyar brothers and some of Kattabomman's allies evaded capture and, along with Dheeran Chinnamalai, fought the Second Polygar War against the British. Though the rebels were initially successful, and Chinnamalai inflicted a severe defeat on Colonel Makiskan, the rebellion was eventually put down in 1802, and all of its leaders captured and hanged. The Maruthu Pandiyar brothers defeated the British troops at Virupatchi and repulsed an attack on Sivagangai but were defeated and captured at Cholapuram. The brothers were hanged in October 1801, along with other prisoners.

== Vellore Mutiny ==
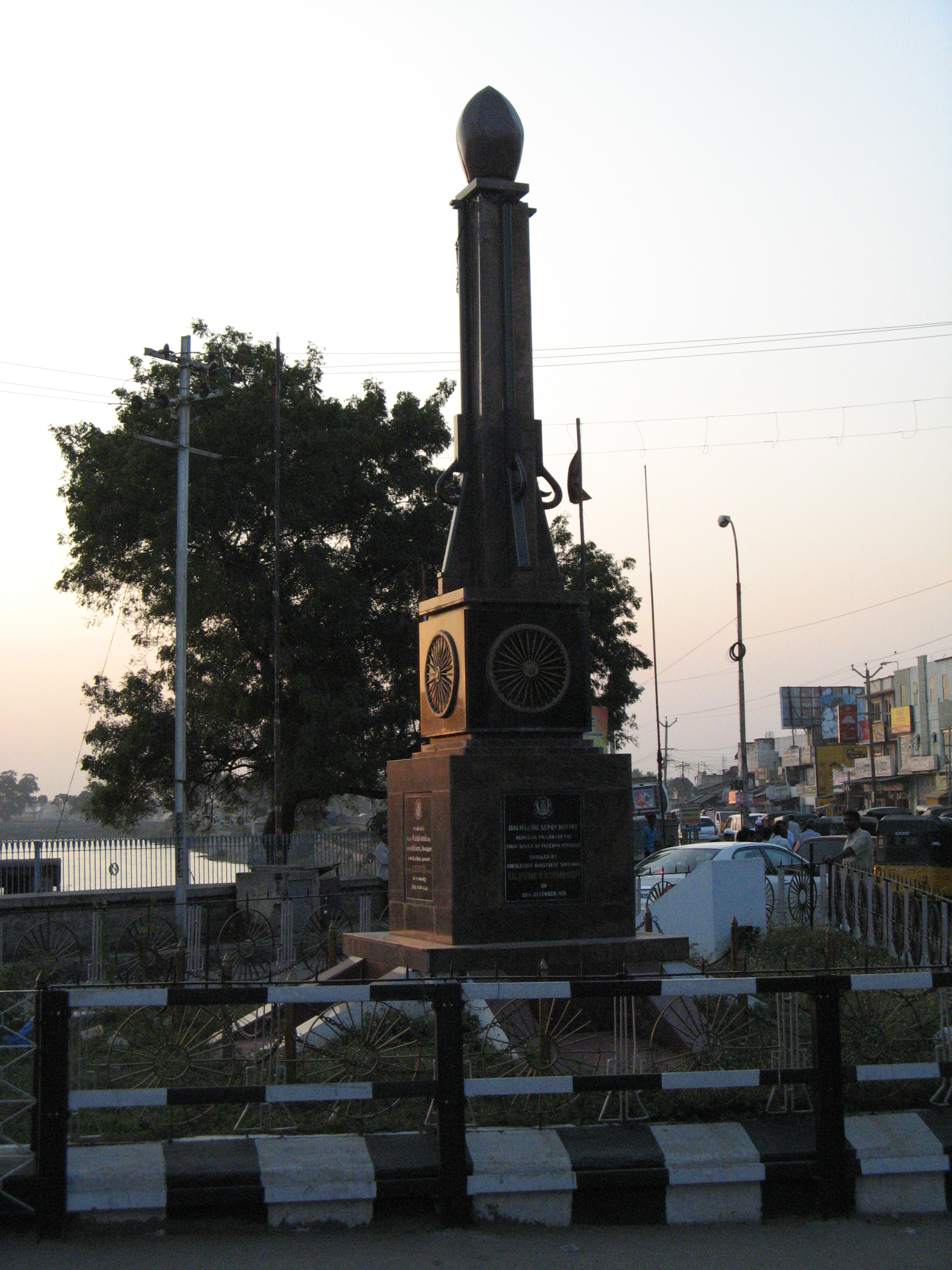
Pillar commemorating the Mutiny at Vellore.

On 10 July 1806, a sepoy mutiny broke out in the town of Vellore, 130 km from Madras. The sepoys of the Vellore garrison were displeased with a recently introduced law regulating the usage of Hindu caste marks or beards. Full-scale rebellion broke out after midnight on 10 July 1806 and Fateh Hyder, the second son of Tipu Sultan, who was imprisoned in Vellore Fort was crowned king. However, reinforcements arrived from the nearby town of Arcot within fifteen minutes, and the rebellion was successfully quelled by Sir Rollo Gillespie. Over 100 captured sepoys were executed by blasting them with canister shots. William Bentinck, the Governor of Madras, was recalled and replaced. The laws regulating Hindu religious marks was withdrawn.

== Opposition to missionary activities ==
Gazulu Lakshminarasu Chetty

During the 19th century, the British rulers of India actively endorsed the activities of Christian missionaries and enacted laws to empower them and to favour proselytism. In 1844, a law was introduced that amended Hindu law to allow Christian converts to inherit property from their Hindu ancestors. At about the same time, Christian theology was introduced as a compulsory subject in the curriculum of the University of Madras.

Gazulu Lakshminarasu Chetty, a popular indigo merchant, launched a campaign against those measures and presided over a protest meeting in Madras on 7 October 1846. The protestors even petitioned lawmakers and social and political activists in United Kingdom and enlisted their support. The laws were eventually withdrawn. Chetty was made a Companion of the Order of the Star of India and nominated as the second Indian to the Madras Legislative Council. Chetty was also assisted in his efforts by the Madras lawyer and Indophile John Bruce Norton, whose own participation in the Indian national movement is significant.

The conversion of a Brahmin student of the Madras Christian College in April 1888 sparked severe protests from Hindus in the Madras Presidency. The agitators resolved to start national schools to counter evangelistic activities in missionary-run schools and colleges. Most of the leaders were Indian nationalists who had recently founded the Indian National Congress.

== The Hindu and the Madras Mahajana Sabha ==
Delegates at the first session of the Indian National Congress, 1885

Indian nationalists in the 19th century propagated their views and objectives by starting newspapers and forming social and political organisations. The first Indian-run newspaper The Crescent was started by Chetty to counter Christian missionary propaganda and alleged British injustices. However, the newspaper that played a major part in the history of the Indian independence movement in Tamil Nadu was the English-language The Hindu which was started by the Indian independence activists G. Subramania Iyer, M. Veeraraghavachariar and N. Subba Rao Pantulu in 1878 in support of the candidature of T. Muthuswamy Iyer as the first Indian judge of the Madras High Court. In the following years, The Hindu launched severe criticisms of economic policies of the government.

The Madras Native Association, established by Chetty in 1852, was the first Indian political organisation in the Madras Presidency. On 16 May 1884, the Madras Mahajana Sabha was founded by prominent Indian leaders of the Presidency such as P. Rangaiah Naidu of Madras, Salem Ramaswami Mudaliar of Salem and M. Veeraraghavachariar of Chingleput. Its founders later played leading roles in the Indian National Congress.

The Indian National Congress was established by the efforts of Allan Octavian Hume and with the blessings of Viceroy of India Lord Ripon and held its first meeting at the Tejpal Sanskrit College, Bombay, between 28 and 31 December 1885. Among the 72 delegates who attended the first session, 22 were from the Madras Presidency.

City/Town	Delegate/s	Profile
Madras (8)	P. Rangaiah Naidu (1828–1904)	vakil, Madras High Court. Municipal Commissioner, Madras. President of the Madras Mahajana Sabha (1884). Member of the Madras Legislative Council (1892–99).
Madras (8)	S. Subramania Iyer (1842–1924)	lawyer, Madras High Court. Member of the Madras Legislative Council (1884–87).
Madras (8)	G. Subramania Iyer (1855–1916)	journalist and social reformer. Founder of English-language The Hindu (1878) and Tamil-language Swadesamitran (1882).
Madras (8)	P. Anandacharlu (1843–1908)	vakil, Madras High Court, journalist and Municipal Commissioner, Madras.
Madras (8)	M. Veeraraghavachariar	journalist. Sub-editor of The Hindu. Secretary of the Madras Mahajana Sabha.
Madras (8)	C. Singaravelloo Mudaliar	Merchant and Municipal Commissioner, Madras. Trustee, Pachaiyappa's Charities.
Madras (8)	M. E. Shriranga Chariar	Lawyer, Madras High Court
Madras (8)	S. V. Athalye	Medical practitioner, Madras
Chingleput (1)	M. Y. Ramanujachariar	Pleader, Chingleput
Coimbatore (1)	S. P. Narasimhalu Naidu (1854–1922)	journalist and social reformer. Secretary of the Coimbatore unit of the Madras Mahajana Sabha and editor of The Crescent.
Tanjore (2)	S. A. Saminatha Iyer (d. 1899)	public prosecutor and lander proprietor. President of the Tanjore People's Association and corresponding member of the Madras Mahajana Sabha. Chairman of the Tanjore Municipal council and member of the district board
Tanjore (2)	N. Narayanaswami Iyer	landlord, Tanjore
Kumbakonam (1)	K. Pattabhirama Iyer	landlord
Madura (1)	P. Subramania Iyer	landlord
Salem (1)	Kristnaswamy Rout	
Tinnevely (1)	Peter Paul Pillai	headmaster and landlord

Important public personalities of the Presidency, like Rangaiah Naidu, S. Subramania Iyer, and G. Subramania Iyer, attended the first session of the Indian National Congress. However, some prominent personalities like Eardley Norton, Salem Ramaswami Mudaliar, C. Jambulingam Mudaliar, T. Madhava Rao and R. Raghunatha Rao did not participate in the first session. Nevertheless, the Indian National Congress, with its ideals actively propagated by members of the Theosophical Society, grew by leaps and bounds, and the tremendously successful 1887 session of the Congress was held in Madras and presided over by Madhava Rao. The visiting dignitaries were welcomed by Lord Connemara, the Governor of Madras. In 1889, Eardley Norton and Salem Ramaswami Mudaliar led an Indian delegation to the United Kingdom to set up a UK chapter of the Indian National Congress.

From the early 1900s, leadership of the Indian National Congress passed on to a new generation of politicians such as P. S. Sivaswami Iyer, C. Sankaran Nair, M. Krishnan Nair, C. P. Ramaswami Iyer, S. Srinivasa Iyengar and P. Theagaroya Chetty. Eventually, with the passage of time and the influx of revolutionary ideas from the north, the movement turned violent.

== Rise of the radicals ==
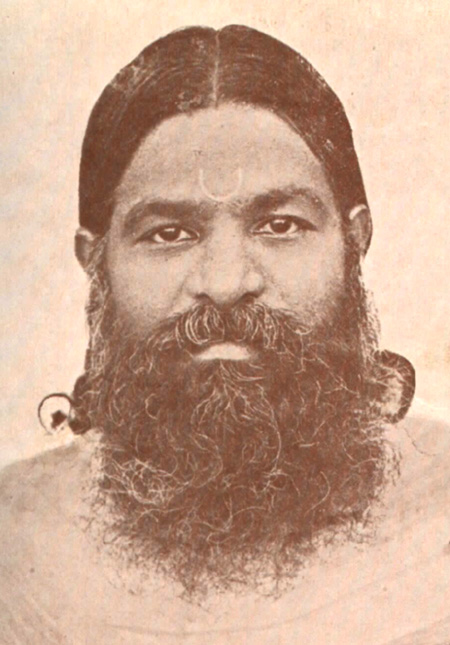
V. V. S Aiyar

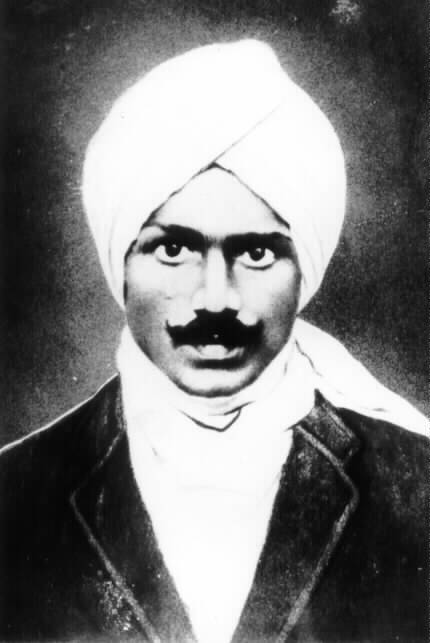
Subramania Bharathi

The split between the moderates and radicals at the Surat session of the Indian National Congress in 1906 was also accompanied by a split between the moderate and extremist elements in the Indian independence movement in Tamil Nadu. The extremists included Bal Gangadhar Tilak Subramania Bharathi and V. O. Chidambaram Pillai.

Bharathi was a prodigious Tamil poet and writer and is often regarded as the "national poet of Tamil Nadu". His virulently anti-British writings in New India and Swadesamitran attracted the attention of the government, which issued a warrant for his arrest and forvced him to flee to the French territory of Pondicherry.

Pillai (VOC) founded the first Indian-owned shipping company in British India, the Swadeshi Steam Navigation Company, to challenge British monopoly over shipping. From the beginning, the company had to deal with the hostility and the bias of British administrators and competitors. Eventually, the company was liquidated and Pillai thrown in jail.

V. V. S. Aiyar, an associate of V. D. Savarkar, joined the India House and participated in the Hindu–German Conspiracy. In 1911, one of Aiyar's associates, Vanchinathan, shot dead General Robert Ashe, the District Collector of Trichinopoly. Vanchinathan, later, shot himself to evade arrest.

Extremist activities in Tamil Nadu reached a climax during the First World War. The British theosophist Annie Besant, who had been campaigning for social reforms and increased rights and privileges for Indians, launched the Home Rule League in 1915 to pressure the British government into granting self-rule to India. She was put under house arrest on the orders of the Governor of Madras Lord Pentland and was released only after a long protracted legal battle waged by Sir S. Subramania Iyer and Muhammad Ali Jinnah.

The Rowlatt Act and the subsequent Jallianwala Bagh massacre provoked outrage in the Tamil-speaking districts of Madras Presidency. S. Subramania Iyer returned his knighthood and S. Srinivasa Iyengar, his CIE.

== Dyarchy ==
The Montague-Chelmsford reforms of 1919 introduced a dyarchical system of governance in all the three Presidencies of Bengal, Bombay and Madras. As per the new reforms, elections were held in the Madras Presidency in November 1920. In the absence of any contest from the Indian National Congress, which had decided to boycott the elections, the Justice Party, an organisation with pro-British leanings, was elected unopposed and formed the government in the province. A. Subbarayalu Reddiar served as premier for a short term and was succeeded by Sir P. Ramarayaningar. The formulation of a policy of caste-based communal reservations in 1921 appears to be one of the highlights of his tenure.

During the 1923 elections, the Justice Party split into two factions: the Constitutionalists and the Ministerialists. That year, the Indian National Congress itself split into two factions, with a group of "No-Changers" claiming the right to use its name in favour of non-participation in the government and the "Swaraj Party" which was in favour of entering it. The Swaraj Party, under S. Srinivasa Iyengar, emerged as the largest party in the 1926 elections. However, it refused to form the government, which prompting Viceroy Lord Goschen to install the regional aristocrat P. Subbarayan as the Premier and nominate members of his own choice to the council to support him. However, the government was beset with problems from the very beginning. as both the Swaraj Party and the Justice Party tried to topple it.

The Simon Commission arrived in India in 1928 for field investigations into the working of the Montague-Chelmsford reforms. The Indian National Congress, the Swaraj Party and the Justice Party, in its initial stages, decided to boycott the commission, as there was no Indian in it. A motion was put forth in both houses of the Madras Legislature to boycott the commission and was passed with absolute majority. However, Premier Subbarayan opposed the motion and prepared to welcome the commission, which prompted both of his ministers (A. Ranganatha Mudaliar and R. N. Arogysamy Mudaliar) to resign in protest. The Vieceroy intervened to appoint S. Muthiah Mudaliar and M. R. Sethuratnam Iyer as ministers in place of the resigned members of the cabinet and appointed Sir M. Krishnan Nair, an important leader of the Justice Party, to the Executive Council to enlist the support of its members. The motion was eventually defeated and the Simon Commission was accorded a warm welcome despite cries of foul play by the Swaraj Party.

The Justice Party was voted back to power in the 1930 elections, and B. Munuswamy Naidu served as premier for a short term before he was succeeded by the Raja of Bobbili, R. S. Ramakrishna Ranga Rao. However, the economic conditions of the Great Depression, combined with anti-incumbency and the rising corruption of the Justice Party ranks, resulted in its defeat in the 1934 elections. However, the Justice Party was returned to power since the Swaraj Party, the largest party, refused to form the government. However, by 1937, things had changed, and a united and rejuvenated Indian National Congress participated in the first elections to be held under the Government of India Act 1935 registered its famous win and a nearly complete rout for the Justice Party.

== Sources ==
- Sivagnanam, M. P. (1988). History of Freedom Movement in Tamil Nadu: Vidutalai poril Tamilakam. Tamil University. ISBN 8170901146. ISBN 978-81-7090-114-3.
- Saroja Sundararajan (1997). Madras Presidency in Pre-Gandhian Era: A Historical Perspective, 1884–1915. Lalitha Publications.
- David Arnold (1977). The Congress in Tamilnad: nationalist politics in South India, 1919–1937. David Arnold. ISBN 0883869586. ISBN 978-0-88386-958-1.

== See also ==
- Tinnevely Riot of 1908
- 1921 Buckingham and Carnatic Mills Strike
- 1928 South Indian Railway Strike
- Neil Statue Satyagraha
- 1932 Madras and Southern Mahratta Railway Strike
