= Pallar =

Agricultural Caste in Tamil Nadu, India

Regions with significant populations
- Southern, Central and Western districts of Tamil Nadu; Northern and Eastern Provinces of Sri Lanka

Languages
- Tamil

Religion
- Hinduism, Christianity

Related ethnic groups
- Tamil people, Sri Lankan Pallar

The Pallar, also called Mallar, are an agricultural community from the Indian state of Tamil Nadu and Sri Lanka. The Pallars traditionally inhabited the fertile wetland area referred to as Marutham in the literary devices of the Sangam landscape. Today, they are the dominant Dalit community of southern Tamil Nadu and have developed a reputation for being assertive about their rights. Due to the demand of the Pallar community to classify them under a more dignified generic name Devendrakula Velalar, recently they together with six other related castes have been given the name Devendrakula Velalar; however their original caste name remains valid and they are still part of the Scheduled Caste list.

== Etymology ==
The name Pallar might have been derived from Pallam, which means a geographically low lying area such as the "Plains". This aligns with their traditional occupation of cultivators of the low wetlands in the Marutham land of Sangam landscape. There is literary evidence that suggests that Pallars were traditional farmers who produced large quantities of food grains, and that some were probably rulers (Pallava dynasty) in the Tamil region. The change of name from "Mallar" to "Pallar" is believed to have been imposed upon them after the decline of their rule, when the leaders of competing tribes such as Vijayanagara Empire and the succeeding Nayakars wanted to suggest a degradation in status. The caste name is sometimes being spelled as Pallan. The -"an" suffix is originally masculine singular and in colloquial usage often attached when implying disrespect. This usage has been observed for other service castes. The plural and respectable suffix is denoted by -"ar", resulting in the name Pallar, which is the one usually preferred.

== History ==
The Pallars traditionally inhabited the fertile wetland area referred to as Marutham in the literary devices of the Sangam landscape. Vendan, also known as Devendra and identified with Indra, is the god of the Marutham landscape and also one of the chief deities of the Pallars. Agriculture, being the dominant occupation in Sangam society, had gained a status and expertise. Some historians have claimed the Pallars are descendants of the Pallavas who ruled the Andhra and Tamil countries between the 6th and 9th centuries. Tamil scholar M. Srinivasa Iyengar claimed the Pallars were one of the communities who served often in Pallava armies.

Under the Cholas, agricultural life throughout Tamil country was dominated by independent peasant-proprietors while there also existed a large class of landless agricultural labourers. During Vijayanagara rule and the Nayak period after, the Pallars were primarily agricultural labourers with no right to own land. Two 17th-century inscriptions calling the Pallars Devendrakutumpan and "son of the celestial woman" have been found in Tirunelveli and Ramanathapuram districts. The socio-economic position of the Pallar as bonded servants working on farms is a central theme of Pallu poetry popular in the 17th century.

Together with the Udayar and Kallar, they form the Marava castes, who are quite dominant in the region variously known as Ramnad and the Maravar country.

Movements to improve the condition of the Pallars have existed since the 1920s. Starting in the 1930s, the Pallars began to get educated with the support of Christian missionaries, giving them access to new opportunities outside the village. In the 1950s the Pallars began to organize themselves around Immanuel Sekaran. Sekaran, born to a Christian Pallar family and a veteran of the Second World War, was presuaded to join Congress to oppose the All India Forward Bloc of U. Muthuramalingam Thevar, a popular leader among the Pallars' traditional Thevar rivals. His rise caused a wave of assertion among the Pallars as they became sensitized to their rights and resisted exploitation by dominant castes. During a fraught by-election in 1957, a peace meeting between Thevar and Sekaran was called, during which Sekaran was murdered allegedly with Thevar's support. The resultant agitations led to the 1957 Ramnad riots, where Thevars and Pallars fought and 47 Dalits were killed. Although the Congress government at the time offered help to the Pallars, they slowly became ignored by mainstream parties starting in the 1960s.

Starting in the 1970s, a number of independent Pallar candidates began contesting elections. In the 1980s, John Pandian emerged as a major leader of the Pallars. At this time, violence between the Pallars and Thevars was increasing and Pandian gained particular notoriety in the media and admiration in the community, with some calling him Pallar Padai Thalapathy ("Commander of the Pallar force"). He gained particular notoriety after the Bodinayakkanur riots of 1989, when a clip of one of his speeches was replayed and was believed to be one of the causes for the riots.

Starting in the 1990s, Pandian was sidelined with the emergence of K. Krishnaswamy, leader of the Devendrakula Velalar Federation. During this time, Pallar-Thevar conflict became much more pronounced as each community asserted their rights further. Krishnaswamy gained particular attention after a particularly brutal one of these incidents: the Kodiyankulam riots in 1995, which started with an argument between Thevar students and a Pallar driver, which escalated when a statue of U Muthuramalingam Thevar was vandalized. In the violence that followed 18 people were killed and culminated with a police attack against Dalits in Kodiyankulam. Krishnaswamy was highly critical of the government's response and advocated for strong Dalit resistance to Thevar aggression, bringing him significant support from Pallar youth.

Violence between Thevars and Pallars broke out again when the DMK government implemented a decision to name a transport corporation after Veeran Sundaralingam, companion of Veerapandiya Kattabomman and a Pallar icon. Other riots occurred in Virudhunagar district in 1997, when Pallars asserted their right to pull the car during a temple festival.

== Devendrakula Velalar Movement ==
The title 'Devendrakula Velalar', with connotations of higher status, and the formation of Devendrakula Velalar identity is an ambitious project and it allows a large number of pallar sub-castes to unite under one label. The term 'Devendrakula Velalalar' is politically significant because it is a form of identity that submerges various Pallar subgroups and provides a basis on which unified political action can be taken. The new title implies 'an alternative, superior, non-untouchable identity' and carries an implicit claim for a higher social status. Since the 1990s, community members have preferred to refer to themselves as Devendrakula Velalar (DKV), literally "Vellalars of the clan of Devendra." This has primarily been to rid themselves of what they see as a 'demeaning' name and to adopt a more 'respectable' name. In support of a name change to DKV, Pallars have undertaken hunger strikes and rallies. The Puthiya Tamilagam (PT), founded by Krishnaswamy in 2001, has campaigned for the appellation of DKV to be applied to the Pallar, Kudumbar, Kaladi, Mooppan, Devendra Kulathan and Pannadi communities since the 1990s and between 2006 and 2011 a one-man commission looked into it on behalf of the state government, then controlled by the Dravida Munnetra Kazhagam (DMK). Nothing came of the commission because the DMK lost power in 2011. The PT then allied with the All India Anna Dravida Munnetra Kazhagam in the hope that this would lead to the renaming but by 2015 had become frustrated with the inaction and was organising protests.

In 2015, the Bharatiya Janata Party, until then a minor player in Tamil Nadu politics, was approached about the name change. In 2016, the centre announced it would appoint anthropologists to investigate the DKV claim in relation to the Pallar, Kudumbar, Pannadi, Kaladi, Kadayan, Devendra Kulathan and Vadhiriyar communities. It said that the decision was not motivated by a desire for political support from the affected communities but rather a reaction to a petition organised by the Thevendrar Thannarva Arakattalai (TTA) that had attracted over 500,000 signatories. Whilst the TTA said at the time that the change of name would have no effect on the Scheduled Caste status enjoyed by the communities under India's system of positive discrimination, by 2018 the PT leader, K. Krishnasamy, was demanding that they be removed from that classification. This announcement met with criticism, in part because it was claimed that Krishnasamy had only in the previous year become an advocate for the putative DVK communities and that previously he had been concerned more generally with Dalit politics. Doubts were expressed by Dalit intellectuals regarding whether Krishnasamy actually had the support of the majority of people from the affected communities for an idea which had originated with the Sangh Parivar and which, it was claimed, Krishnasamy was "latching on to" because he was "losing his political relevance". It was argued that the Vellalar term implied that the communities were adopting the sanskritisation process and that this would further emphasis caste divisions in a society that should be lessening them.

In March 2021 the Lok Sabha passed a bill approving the name change for the seven castes in question, including the Pallars. Opposition MPs, while supporting the name change, claimed it was only done because of the approaching Tamil Nadu Assembly Elections.

The traditional occupation of the Pallars has been agricultural labour. In the past, most were bonded to the land and were forced to perform adimai toli (slave work). However they never had to perform any particular occupation seen as ritually 'degrading,' such as skinning cattle or collecting feces. Although they also have done gravedigging work, they do it freely and do not see it as demeaning as they get paid for it. Today, a large minority of the Pallars have gained from education and government jobs. Many work in factories, offices, government jobs and other non-agricultural occupations.

Due to the demand of the Pallar community to classify them under a more dignified generic name Devendrakula Velalar, recently they together with six other related castes have been given the name Devendrakula Velalar; however their original caste name remains valid and they are still part of the Scheduled Caste list.

== Social status ==
The social status of the Pallars has remained low since the Vijayanagara Empire rule. Upper castes, especially Brahmins, Chettiyars, Vellalars as well as many middle castes practice untouchability against them, and they face severe social restrictions such as not walking through dominant-caste localities or the Two tumbler system especially prevalent in southern districts. In villages where they are small minorities and are highly dependent on dominant castes for livelihoods, this untouchability is highly practised. But since they do not practice a particular task seen as 'degrading,' the source of this low ritual status is highly unclear. Consequently, they have also been seen as having the highest status among Dalit communities, especially compared to the other major Dalit communities: Paraiyars and Arunthathiyars. In many cases, the Pallars practice untouchability against other Dalit castes to maintain this status. However, being a majority in a village Pallars remained not only prosperous but they also gained political power. This disparity let many discussions among scholarly fields, concluding that the Pallars form two groups of one being untouchables and the other one regarded as high.

In some points, Pallars deem themselves superior to communities such as the Valaiyars, who have fewer dietary restrictions than the Pallar. However, their history of adimai toli meant they were considered 'lower' than the Valaiyars, who are classified under Backward Classes. They have also been forced to live outside the village boundary, also a marker of untouchability.

The Pallars have become the most socially mobile Dalit community due to a significant minority in non-traditional occupations. This has meant that in villages where Pallars form a significant population, they have higher rates of land ownership, corresponding to educational and economic advancement. This lessened dependence on dominant castes has allowed the Pallars to become highly assertive about their rights and dignity in society, as the Pallars have often rejected their low social status. The Pallars also claim descent from Kshatriyas, making them more inclined to a more 'martial' tradition. However, this increased assertiveness has also provoked resentment from the poor among dominant communities, especially the Thevars, who see the Pallars' rise as against the 'natural order.' For this reason, violence between the two communities is not uncommon.

== Temple festivals ==
The Devendrakula Velalar community traditionally celebrate and initiate the temple car festivals at various major historic temples, such as the Perur Pateeswarar Temple and Koniamman Temple at Coimbatore, Srivilliputhur Andal temple. Nellaiappar Temple at Tirunelveli. the Vandiyur Mariamman Teppakulam, Makara Nedunkuzhaikathar Temple at Thenthiruperai. and the dedcorated flower palanquin at Kamakshi Amman Temple at Kanchipuram.

== Demographics ==
As per 2011 Indian Census, the community constitutes 4% of the population of Tamil Nadu.

== See also ==
- Devendrar Jayanti
- Immanuvel Devendrar
- Paramakudi Riots
- 1957 Ramnad riots
- Veeran Sundaralingam
- Periya Kaladi
