= 2013 Marakkanam violence =

Outbreak of caste-based violence in India

The 2013 Marakkanam violence was an incident of violence in Tamil Nadu between Pattali Makkal Katchi (PMK) and Dalit villagers in Marakkanam. The violence was instigated when drunk PMK cadres attacked Dalit villagers. The Dalit villagers blocked the road demanding their attackers be arrested which stopped the vehicle convoy taking PMK members to a youth festival organized by the Vanniyar Sangam at Mamallapuram. The PMK members attacked the Dalit colony and burned down nine huts of Dalits, they attacked homes of Muslims and offices of AIADMK MPs, they vandalized buses, felled trees among other things. In the ensuing violence, two PMK members were killed.

Later, S. Ramadoss, his son, Anbumani, and several PMK leaders were arrested by the Jayalalithaa government for breaking rules in their festival, which led to even more violence by the PMK members who damaged over 800 buses and felled 165 trees. The violence caused an estimated property damages worth ₹600 crores.

In 2016, six VCK members were convicted for the murder of one of the PMK members.

== Background ==
The PMK declared that on April 25, 2013, the party will hold a festival for Vanniyar youth, as it has done for the last many years. The celebration was to be held on the seaside near the Shore Temple in Mamallapuram, and it was to be organized by the Vanniyar Sangam. Following the 2012 Dharmapuri violence, there has been a resurgence of antagonism between Dalits and Vanniyars, notably in the western part of the Dharmapuri district.

== Violence ==
PMK cadres in hundreds of vehicles were on their way to attend the youth conference at Mahaballipuram. Some PMK cadre stopped near a bus stop at a Dalit village in Marakkanam colony and consumed alcohol. When a few villagers questioned them, the PMK men assaulted the villagers and fled the scene. The injured villagers warned others in their hamlet and a huge number of Dalits blocked on the East Coast Road and demanded that the perpetrators be apprehended by the police.

This block stranded the PMK vehicle convoy. Unable to reach their destination, the PMK members went on a rampage. A group of PMK members entered Kattayan Theru, a Dalit settlement, and hurled petrol bombs at the Dalit houses which burned down nine huts. The majority of Kattayan Theru's population are followers of the Viduthalai Chiruthaigal Katchi (VCK). The Shore Temple which is one of the World Heritage Site was desecrated by PMK members who had assembled in Mamallapuram for a festival for the youth form the Vanniyar caste. Other vandalism occurred that day and the following days, including setting fire to private and government buses, vehicles, ration stores and liquor outlets, wrecking culverts, and chopping down trees. They attacked Muslim homes in the adjoining village of Koonimedu. Houses and offices of governing All India Anna Dravida Munnetra Kazhagam (AIADMK) Members of the Parliament were also attacked by PMK members. Two PMK cadres, Selvaraj and Vivek were killed.

== Arrests ==
Ramadoss was detained by Chief Minister Jayalalithaa for breaking the rules for holding the party meeting in Mamallapuram. PMK president G.K. Mani, Ramadoss' son Anbumani Ramadoss, former Union Minister A.K. Moorthy, Kaduvetti Guru were also detained by the police. Ramadoss and Mani were placed in judicial custody at Tiruchi Central Prison, while the others were detained in Puzhal Central Prison. Old cases involving Ramadoss, Anbumani, and Kaduvetti Guru were reopened.

=== Violence due to the arrests ===
This arrest spread violence across the state. PMK cadres stoned the buses to protest against the arrest of their leaders. In the districts of Thiruvannamalai, Villupuram, Cuddalore, Vellore and Kanchipuram, some 1,601 buses were not operated even during day time due to violence. The violence took place till the release of S Ramadoss on 11 May from Tiruchirapalli Central Prison. Totally, 853 buses were damaged and 165 trees were cut down during violence. A truck driver from Rajasthan was killed when petrol bombs hit his truck and a lorry driver was killed from stone pelting. The violence caused property damages estimated worth ₹600 crores.

Jayalalitha likened the party to a “terrorist” organization and claimed they hurled petrol bombs on moving vehicles. Jayalalithaa threatened to ban PMK party over the violence.

== Court proceedings and conviction ==
The police detained ten persons in September 2016, a couple of weeks after the Madras High Court directed the arrest of 32 PMK cadres for setting fire to houses during the riots.

Marakanam police filed case against 1,512 persons from both sides and inquired further. Initially it was said by police that Selvaraj was killed by accident but after post mortem reports revealed stab injuries on his body, the police changed the accident case to murder case. On 9 May 2013, the CB-CID officials registered a murder case against six VCK cadres for attacking PMK cadre Selvaraj. On 3 February 2016 sessions court in Tindivanam pronounced the judgement that all the six accused VCK cadres were found guilty and convicted to life imprisonment for brutally killing Selvaraj. The judge pronounced the crime to be ‘rarest of rare’ while awarding the life sentence. The case on other person killed named Vivek is still under proceedings.

== See also ==
- 1957 Ramnad riots
- Caste-related violence in India
- Dalit
- Manjolai Labourers Massacre
- Paramakudi Riots
