= Arunthathiyar Reservation Act 2009 =

Act of the Tamil Nadu state Government

- Jāti: Arunthathiyar; Chakkiliyan; Pagadai (ethnic group); Thoti; Madiga; Madari; Adi Andhra
- Classification: Scheduled Caste
- Religions: Hinduism, Christianity
- Languages: Tamil, Telugu, Kannada, Malayalam
- Country: India
- Original state: Tamil Nadu
- Populated states: Tamil Nadu, Andhra Pradesh, Kannada, Kerala
- Ethnicity: South Asian
- Population: 1,861,457
- Reservation (Education): 3 %

Arunthathiyar Reservation Act 2009, In 2009 the government of the Indian state of Tamil Nadu enacted a law to provide an umbrella term for a group of seven communities. The seven communities were Arunthathiyar, Chakkiliyan (Sakkiliyar), Pagadai (ethnic group), Madari, Madiga, Thoti and Adi Andhra. The term was "Schedule caste Arunthathiyar" (SCA). This act was passed during the Dravida Munnetra Kazhagam regime (2009 to 2013).

== History ==
Tamil Nadu legislative history shows that the government made its position clear when it comes to creating a category for the Scheduled Seven communities. Protestors in 2007-2008 demand separate reservations for the seven communities listed under the Scheduled Caste category. The CPI(M) and the Aadi Tamilar Peravai were involved in this protest. Some movements came out in support. To address their demands, the late Chief Minister M. Karunanidhi appointed the Justice Janardhanan Commission. The Commission stated that although the Scheduled Seven communities constituted 16 percent of the Dalit population as per the 2001 census, they were at the bottom of the caste system. They demanded 3% reservation as a solution for their advancement. The Dravida Munnetra Kazhagam government had allocated 3% of internal reservations for the seven Scheduled Communities within the 18 percent reservation for Scheduled Caste Dalits. These seven communities were merged into one (Arunthathiyars). The Arunthathiyar Reservation Act came into effect on 29 April 2009.

== Communities ==
The seven communities joined together formed the scheduled caste Arunthathiyar (SCA) or SC(A). The communities are Arunthathiyar, Chakkilian (sakkiliyar), Pagadai, Thoti, Madari, Madiga and Adi Andhra.

== Population ==
The populations of the communities in the 2001 census of India:

- Adi Andhra – 40371
- Arunthathiyar – 771659
- Chakkiliyan – 777139
- Madari – 249494
- Madiga – 5103
- Pagadai – 13795
- Thoti – 3896

== See also ==
- Dalit
- Schedule caste
