= Chakkiliyan (Sakkiliyar) =

Tamil tribe living in Tamil Nadu

Sakkiliyar
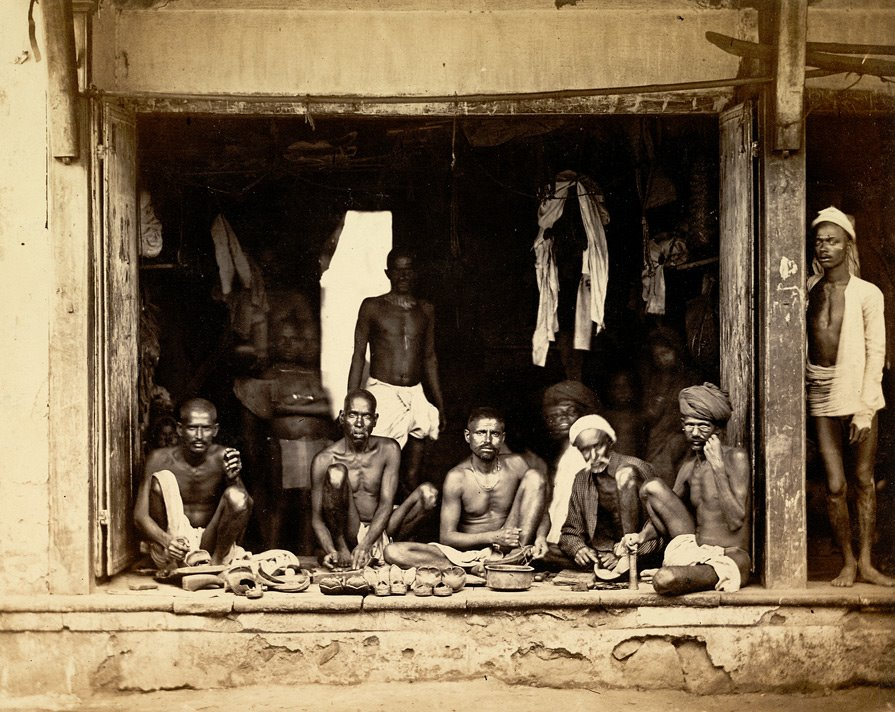
- Shoeworkers of Tamil Nadu

Total population
- 777139 (2011)

Regions with significant populations
- Tamil Nadu

Languages
- Tamil

Religion
- Hinduism, Christianity

Related ethnic groups
- Adi Dravida, Arunthathiyar, Jaggali

Chakkiliyan, also known as Sakkiliyar is an untouchable community of Tamil Nadu. They are considered economically backward in terms of living standards. They are listed in the Scheduled Castes community under the umbrella of Arunthathiyars (SCA).

The Government of Tamil Nadu designated them, along with total of seven communities including, Arunthathiyar, Chakkiliyan (Sakkiliyar), Pagadai (ethnic group) , Madari, Madiga, Thoti and Adi Andhra under SCA in the year 2009. They can be known from the myths of Madurai Veeran and Muthu Pattan.

== Occupation ==
They are the lowest class of the society, such as farm workers, leather workers and Municipal cleaners. They are known to be engaged in many other leather related occupations such as shoemaking, Drum making. They are also engaged in cattle trade and leather trading in leather markets. The Tannery, "shoemaker", who makes leather and leather products, has been a traditional profession. Some prominent people were known as "local shoemakers".

== Education ==
In 1871, the Sakkili caste ranked 63rd, the lowest in the educational rankings. The Thoti's and Paraiyar's ranked 62nd and 45th, respectively. The 1911 census report gives a rough estimate of the literacy rate among the Sakkilis. According to the report, out of 261,421 Sakkili males, 2,449 were educated. Similarly, out of 265,030 females, only 194 were literate. Yet both are poor and the Panisevans are even poorer. Although the Sakilis are much more backward than the Panisevans, both are considered inferior communities.

== Note ==
Just as the chakkiliyans/Sakkiliars live in the Tamil Nadu province, it is also rare to find Jaggali people living in other parts of South India, such as Kerala, Karnataka and Andhra Pradesh.

== See also ==
- Arunthathiyar
- Arunthathiyar reservation act 2009
