= Pagadai =

Schedule Cast in Tamil Nadu, Pagadai

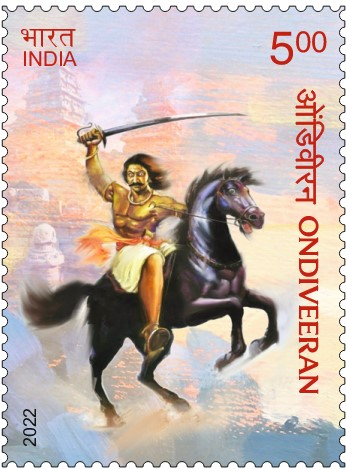
- Ondiveeran Pagadai

Regions with significant populations
- Tamil Nadu

Languages
- Tamil

Religion
- Hindu

Related ethnic groups
- Schedule Caste Arunthathiyar - SCA

The Pagadai are an ethnic group living in Tamil Nadu. They are in the list of schedule caste Arunthathiyars Act (SCA). the total caste seven of them Pagadai one of them. The Tamil Nadu state government's reservation scheme was designated as a unity term for the Schedule caste Arunthathiyar (SCA) that includes Arunthathiyar, Chakkiliyan (Sakkiliyar), Pagadai, Madari, Madiga, Thoti and Adi Andhra communities formed in 2009. The Pagadais live in Tamil Nadu as a Tamil - speaking people. They are included in the Scheduled Caste in the Tamil Nadu Government's Scheduled Caste List.

== Occupation ==
The community is mainly engaged in Agricultural and Cobbling, Leather-related occupations.

== Population ==
According to the 2001 Census of India, they have a population of 13,795.

== See also ==
- Chakkiliyan (sakkiliyar)
- Ondiveeran
