= Balivada Kanta Rao =

Indian writer (1927–2000)

- Born: 3 July 1927; Madapam, Srikakulam district, Inda
- Died: 6 May 2000 (aged 72)
- Writing career
- Genres: Novels, plays, short stories
- Notable awards: Kendriya Sahitya Akademi Award
- Website: balivadakantharao.org

Balivada Kanta Rao (3 July 1927 – 6 May 2000) was a noted Telugu novelist and playwright.

== Early life ==
He was born in Madapam village in Srikakulam District of Andhra Pradesh, he worked in various capacities as civilian officer in the Indian Navy. He has to his credit 38 major and minor novels, 400 short stories, 5 major plays, host of playlets and radio plays and travelogues.

Many of his novels and stories have been translated into other Indian languages. He won several awards which include Andhra Pradesh Sahitya Akademi, Telugu University Award, Gopichand Literary award, Ravi Shastri Memorial Award and Kalasagar Vishishta Puraskaram. He was the winner of Kendriya Sahitya Akademi Award in 1998 by the Government of India.

== Novels and novelettes ==
Balivada's published repertoire includes 38 major and minor novels. Many of his works have been translated into Hindi, Gujarati, Kannada and other Indian languages. Some of his works are:

- Nerasthulu (1947)
- Sharada (1947)
- Parajayam (1949)
- Annapurna (1950)
- Buchi (1950)
- Suguna (1951)
- Godameeda Bomma (1953)
- Dagapadina Tammudu (1957)
- Matsyagandhi (1962)
- Sampangi (1970)
- Nalugu Manchalu (1966)
- Punyabhumi (1969)
- Ide Narakam Ide Swargam (1974)
- Vamsadhara (1982)
- Delhi Majlilu (1984)
- Chaitra Parvam (1977)
- Love in Goa (1984)
- Maro Rajasekhara Charitra (1986)
- Ajanta (1986)
- Ellora (1988)
- Ammi and Janmabhoomi (2003. Published Posthumously)

Apart from the novels, 400 short stories, 8 Plays, travelogues, essays have been published and staged. Many of his plays were broadcast on All India Radio and Doordarshan. Five anthologies of his stories and one anthology of six small novellas have been published
