= Kollamkondan =

Geographical region in Tamil Nadu, India

Coordinates: 9.49°N 77.69°E

Kollankondan was a territory (Zamin) in the former Tirunelveli province of Madurai Nayak Dynasty ruled by Polygar. Post Independence of India it split into as 2 villages Ayan Kollan Kondan and Zamin Kollan Kondan Kollankondan Pommumma Samy in Thoothukudi district God in Thoothukudi district ayyanar and come under Virudhunagar District in the southern Indian State of Tamil Nadu in India.

== Palayam Location ==
This Maravar palayam was located near Rajapalayam, at the foot of the Western Ghats, in the former Tirunelveli province of the Pandiyar dynasty of Madura.

== Polygar ==
Polygar Vandayar Thevar belonged to the Pandaram subcaste of the Maravar. The polygar family was granted the lands by Raja Parakrama Pandya of Pandya Dynasty before the establishment of the Madurai state by Visvanatha Nayaka in the 16th century. It joined Puli Thevar's coalition in 1754-1762. The polygar of Kollamkondan led a new insurrection in 1764, following Yusuf Khan's execution for having betrayed the Nawab. Victories over the Anglo-Nawabi forces helped the revolt spread to other polygars.

Successive Kings of Kollankondan Zamin

1.Vandaya Thevan

2.vandaya Thevan

3. Boopathi vandayar and Boomi Vandayar

4.Ponnaya Thirumalai vandayar

5. Sankara Pandiya Thirumalai vandayar- Muththammmal

6. Ponnaya Thirumalai vandayar- Ramalakshmi Nachiyar

7. Harihara Puthira Sankara Narayana Dhakshina Moorthi Thirumalai vandayar-Muthulakshmi Nachiyar

8.Lingasundhara dass Thirumalai vandayar

9. Natarajan Thirumalai vandayar- Rajalakshmi Nachiyar

10. Linga Sundhara Thirumalai Vandayar

11. Linga Rajendhira Thirumalai vandayar- Palaniyammal Nachiyar

12.Sankar Thirumalai Vandayar- Dhanalakshmi Nachiyar

13. Kabirajan Thirumalai vandayar- Lakshmi Nachiyar

14. Mahesh Thirumalai vandayar-Poongothai Nachiyar

15.Rajasekar Thirumalai vandayar

16. Harikaran Thirumalai vandayar

17. Jeyasri Nachiyar- Rajan

18. Manisha Nachiyar

== Decline and Merger with Sethur Zamin ==
After 1766, General Donald Campbell began a systematic campaign, taking the forts of the major confederates one by one. In 1802, the polygar of Kollamkondan, held only four villages. In 1879, the zamindari had an area of 1.35 sq. m., and a population of 9,021. Later in the 19th century it was included in the zamindari of Sethur.

== Post abolition of Zamindari ==
Kollamkondan post independence comprises 2 villages . Both are revenue villages under the Rajapalayam Taluk

- Zamin Kollan kondan
- Ayan Kollan kondan - Notable person post independence - Dr.N.Rasaiah - Tamilwriter
