= Sethur Town =

Palayam of Madura

Sethur in the Srivilliputtur taluk, at the foot of the Western Ghats, northwest Tirunelveli, is traditionally recognized as one of the 72 palayams of Madura. Sethur today comes under Virudhunagar District of Tamil Nadu.

== Polygar and History ==
Thiruvonnaatha Thevar was sent to protect the northwest area of Madura, which had been usurped by a neighboring raja. He expelled the intruders, built a fort in Sethur and was made a polygar. Polygar Tiruvana (Tiruvannata) Thevar was among the recipients of the letter Ranga Pillai wrote in 1751 in behalf of Dupleix to the 72 poligars of Trichinopoly.Now the Poligar Named "Sevuga Pandiya Thevar". He belongs the Pandaram Subcaste of Marava. It is Marava palaiyam.

=== Notable Events in History ===
- Seithur was one of the palayams that joined Puli Thevar's coalition in 1754-1762 (see Nerkattumseval).
- When Kollamkondan rebelled in 1764, following the execution of Yusuf Khan for having betrayed the nawab, Seithur was quick to join.
- In 1792, taking advantage of a border dispute, the polegar of Sivagiri invaded Seithur, killed the polygar and replaced him with a cousin. The company intervened, however, a restored Seithur's independence. In 1803, Tiruvanna Thevar, the 47th polegar received his sanad from the company and became a zamindar; at the time he only held three villages.

=== Administrative Area ===
In 1879, the zamindari of Seither had an area of 91.44 sq. m. and a population of 11,916. Kollamkondan was merged under Seithur in the late 1800s.
