= Ramaswami Mudaliar =

Ramaswami Mudaliar or Ramaswamy Mudaliar may refer to:

- Arcot Ramasamy Mudaliar (1887–1976), Indian lawyer, politician and statesman
- S. Ramaswami Mudaliar (1840–1911), Indian merchant, dubash, politician and philanthropist
- Salem Ramaswami Mudaliar (1852–1892), Indian lawyer, politician and independence activist
- V. K. Ramaswami Mudaliar, Indian politician, former Member of the Legislative Assembly of Tamil Nadu
