= Pallu (poetry) =

Genre of Tamil poetry

Pallu (பள்ளு) is a genre of Tamil poetry that depicts the life of a Pallar farmer of southern India, his two wives, and his landlord in a satirical fashion.

== Genre ==
Pallu poems are part of chitrilakiyangal in Tamil literature, and were also known as 'aesal'. They were written during the Nayak rule. The first pallu poem was 'mukkoodar pallu'. Many pallu poems were written which include vaiyapuri pallu, sengottu pallu, thandigai kanagaraayan pallu.
