= 1957 Ramnad riots =

Series of riots in Ramnad district, India

The Ramnad riots or the Mudukulathur riots were a series of violent clashes that occurred between July and September 1957 in the Ramnad district and in southern Tamil Nadu, India. The violence was between Maravars, Kudumbars, supporting the Forward Bloc, and pro-Congress , Kudumbars Pallars, and was triggered by a by-election held in the aftermath of the Madras Legislative Assembly elections of earlier that year. 42 Dalits were killed during the riots.

== Background ==
=== Treatment of Dalits ===
Ramanathapuram district was deemed to be infamous for its brutal caste based discrimination during the colonial era of the 1930s. Dalits were denied any type of symbols linked with superior social position. In his book, J. H. Hutton, the then Census Commissioner, explained the eight restrictions enforced on Dalits by upper castes, including a ban on the use of jewelry, ornaments and education. This system was subsequently re-established with a stricter collection of 11 restrictions.

=== Rise of Dalits ===
In the 1930s, with the support of Christian missionaries, Dalits became educated and economically strengthened. As Dalits gained access to jobs and education, they started to assert themselves. But at the other side, the Thevars stayed disadvantaged in education and, as reported in the Government Order in 1957, they were unable to "align themselves with the present democratic reality and could not accept that the feudal system was rapidly disappearing."

Due to the rise of Immanuel Sekaran, there was a huge change in society in the form of resistance to caste exploitation by low-caste and Dalit workers, particularly in the southern districts as well as from left-wing movements in the Thanjavur district. This led to increased awareness amongst Dalits, who used the opportunities available in the government through the policy of reservations. The social scientist M. S. S. Pandian described that migrating to greener pastures and later returning to their villages and investing in agriculture enhanced their financial base, which ultimately led to Dalits, starting to assert themselves.

=== Elections ===
The Congress Reform Committee (CRC) was formed one month before the 1957 elections to the Lok Sabha and the Madras Legislative Assembly, and soon began cooperation with the All India Forward Bloc (AIFB) of U. Muthuramalinga Thevar. The CRC-AIFB combined contested 59 seats in the assembly election, 54 candidates from CRC, and five candidates from AIFB. There was also an informal agreement with the Communist Party of India, which did not oppose the CRC.

In the 1957 general elections, U. Muthuramalinga Thevar had contested both the Srivilliputhur parliamentary seat and the Mudukulathur seat in the Madras legislative assembly. He won both, defeating the Congress candidates. The combined CRC-AIFB formulated a 12-point election manifesto and emerged as the major opposition alliance in these elections, but could not defeat the Congress government. CRC won 14 seats and AIFB won three. Half of the seats won were from the Ramnad and Madurai districts. Following the election, a joint 'CRC opposition' group was formed in the legislative assembly, to counter the bid of the Dravida Munnetra Kazhagam (which had 16 seats) to hold the post of Leader of the Opposition. Soon five independent assembly members joined the CRC opposition group, and V.K. Ramaswamy Mudaliar was elected leader. After the election, Thevar chose to retain his parliamentary seat, and a by-election was called for the Mudukulathur assembly constituency.

The by-election was held on 1 July, and when the results were released on 4 July, the situation in the area grew tense. The Forward Bloc candidate T.L. Sasivarna Thevar won the election. Gradually, incidents of violent clashes between Thevars (who generally supported the Forward Bloc) and pro-Congress Pallar began to occur. Initially these clashes were limited to a handful of villages, but after some time the violence spread throughout the constituency. In order to offer sacrifices to the Badrakali temple, the Maravars kidnapped 9 Dalit men from the Katamangalam village and took them.

== Events during the riots ==
A 'peace conference' was held on 10 September, attended by U. Muthuramalinga Thevar (who had returned day before from Delhi), T.L. Sasivarna Thevar and Velu Kudumbar from the Forward Bloc party, a delegation of six representatives from the Pallar community belonging to the Congress party. The conference was convened by the Ramnad district collector. The peace meeting was held in a nearby village called Mudukulathur. Initially all delegates, including Immanuvel Sekaran and the district collector, appealed to Thevar to campaign for peace in all riot affected areas but it went in vain. The conference delegates finally decided to give statements independently.

On 11 September, Emmanuel Sekaran, a member of the Congress delegation at the peace conference, was murdered in Paramakudi by Maravars.

On 13 September, clashes erupted at Arumkulam. Five Pallars and three Thevars were killed, and their bodies were thrown into a fire. Two of the Thevars and one of the Pallars were women.

On 14 September, a group of armed police entered the village of Keelathooval in order to arrest suspects in the Emmanuel Sekaran murder case. Five Thevars were killed by police gunfire. According to Forward Bloc sources, the five were blindfolded and executed. A police inquiry commission later refuted that claim.

On 16 September, clashes erupted in villages including Veerambal, Arumbakkan, Irulandapatti and Sandakottai. In the two latter places sixteen Pallars, including one woman, were killed by Kallars. On the same day, the Thevar village of Ilanchambol was attacked by a Pallar mob; the village had been deserted by the police two days earlier. Two Thevars were killed in the attack. The attack was interrupted as Thevars from the neighbouring village of Keelapanayur arrived, driving off the pallar and killing four people.

On 17 September, police opened fire on Forward Bloc cadres in the village of Keeranthai. Five of those killed was Thevars and one was a Devendrakula Velalar. On 18 September, Devendrakula Velalar houses were torched in Thandikudi. On 19 September, hundreds of houses, belonging to both Thevars and Devendrakula Velalar, were torched in the villages of Piramanur, Vadi, Tiruppuvanam, Nallur and Tiruppachatti. On the following day police opened fire on a Thevar mob, but with no casualties.

On 20 September, gunfire by police killed five thevars, four in Uluthumadi and one in Malavavanenthall. In Veerambal, Kallar and Maravar stormed a church where a group of Pallars had sought refuge. Two Pallars were killed and a further 32 were injured. On 21 September, more clashes occurred, but from the following day onward there were no reported incidents.

On 28–29 September 1957, CRC held a state conference and reconstituted itself as the Indian National Democratic Congress. U. Muthuralinga Thevar, one of the inaugural speakers of the event, was arrested just after having delivered his speech. Later, a court in Pudukottai acquitted Thevar of all charges. The Judge who handled the case called Muthuramalinga "a lookalike of Vallalar".

On September 10, 1957, Dalits, Kudumbars, Maravars, and Nadars met for negotiations set up by the district collector CVR Panikkar at the time.

== See also ==
- Paramakudi riots
- Manjolai labourers massacre
