= Devendrakula Velalar =

Agricultural caste in Tamil Nadu, India

Languages
- Tamil

Religion
- Hinduism

Related ethnic groups
- Tamil people

Devendrakula Velalar is an agricultural caste in the Indian state of Tamil Nadu. They traditionally inhabited the fertile wetland area referred to as Marutham in the literary devices of the Sangam landscape. It has seven subcastes such as Devendrakulathar, Kalladi, Kudumbar, Pallar, Pannadi, Kadaiyar and Vathiriyar.

== History & Temple festivals ==
Devendrakula Velalars means descendants of Lord Indra (god of rain) and traditionally involved as agriculturists.

=== Temple festivals ===
The Devendrakula Velalar community traditionally celebrate and initiate the temple car festivals at various major historic temples, such as;

- Perur Pateeswarar Temple, Coimbatore
- Koniamman Temple, Coimbatore
- Srivilliputhur Andal temple, Tirunelveli
- Nellaiappar Temple, Tirunelveli
- Vandiyur Mariamman Teppakulam, Madurai
- Makara Nedunkuzhaikathar Temple, Thenthiruperai

Decorated flower palanquin at Kamakshi Amman Temple, Kanchipuram.

=== Seedling planting festival ===
Apart from the temple car initiation at the Perur Pateeswarar Temple, the Seedling Planting festival (Tamil: நாற்று நடவு திருவிழா) has been celebrated by the community along the banks of Noyyal River. The festival is conducted in the month of Aani. The ritual forms a part of Indra festival. The festival has its reference from the "Perur Puranam" by Kachiappa Munivar.

=== Indra Vizha ===
Indra Vizha (Tamil: இந்திர விழா), was a historical Hindu festival that was celebrated in Tamilakam during the Sangam period (2nd century BCE – 3rd century CE). It was celebrated in honour of Vendhan (Indra), the deity associated with the Marutham landscape. In the contemporary period, the festivities associated with the agricultural Indra Vila are primarily associated with the occasion of Bhogi Pongal, the day dedicated to Indra, and preserving all the elements of the seasonal festival. Locally, the Indra Vila is conducted at the Kamatchi Amman temple at the Kallimadai locality near Singanallur in Coimbatore every year. The Venkudai (White umbrella) festival, depicting the white umbrella and the Airavata of Indra, is conducted every year at Rajapalayam, in commemoration of the ancient Indra Vila.

== Politics ==
The Devendrakula Velalar, Mutharaiyar and Brahmin play a major role in Srirangam Assembly constituency, as a majority of voters are from these communities.

== Notable people ==
- Veeran Sundaralinga Kudumbanar, 18th century general and Freedom Fighter
- Periya Kaladi, 17th century general and Freedom Fighter
- M. Arunachalam, Former Union Minister of India
