= Periya Kaladi =

Indian general from Tamil Nadu

- Successor: British Rule
- Born: Nerkattumseval
- Died: 1759
- Religion: Hinduism

Venni Kaladi (died 1759), also known as "Periya Kaladi, was an 18th-century CE general from Tamil Nadu, India

== Fight against Yusuf Khan ==
According to a majority of the accepted historical accounts, Khan Saqib decided to fight against Puli Thevar. The troops of Khan Saqib decided to surround and fight the Nerkattumseval fort at night from the camp they had set up in the night. Then Periya Kaladi attacked the camp and destroyed the troops of Khan Saqib. During the attack, he was wounded by a hidden attack of one of the enemy warriors. Even though the stomach was torn and the intestines came out, but he pushed it back and took the piece tied as a turban and tied it along the gut and proceeded to fight the war and defeated the opponents. He drove his horse and arrived at Puli Thevar to report that they had gone into hiding in the forest with the army and died while lying on the lap of Puli Thevar while delivering the news during a serious injury.

== Legacy ==
Puli Thevar later planted a stone (natukal) at the spot where his commander had died fighting large artillery. The place is still known as 'Kaladi Medu' by the people of the area.

== See also ==
- Puli Thevar
- Veeran Sundaralingam
