= Sellur (Mudukulathur) =

- Village
- Location in Tamil nadu, India Sellur (India)
- Coordinates: 9.350006°N 78.516694°E
- Country: India
- State: Tamil Nadu
- District: Ramanathapuram
- Talukas: Mudukulathur
- Elevation: 19 m (62 ft)

Population (2001)
  - Total: 3,418

Languages
  - Official: Tamil
- Time zone: UTC+5:30 (IST)
- PIN: 623712
- Telephone code: 04576xxx
- Vehicle registration: TN-65
- Largest city: Ramanathapuram
- Nearest city: Mudukulathur; Paramakkudi
- Literacy: 75%
- Lok Sabha constituency: Mudukulathur

Sellur is a village in Ramanathapuram district and Mudukulathur taluka in the Indian state of Tamil Nadu.

== Demographics ==
According to the India census, in 2001 the population of sellur Village was about 3,418. Males constituted 1,720 of the total population, while females constituted 1,698. Sellur village had an average literacy rate of 75%, which was higher than the national average of 59.5%. Male literacy rate was 65% and female literacy rate was 35%. In sellur village, 332 of the population is under 6 years of age.

== Notable Personalities ==
Born in this village of Thiyaki Immanuvel Sekaran devendranar.
