= South Indian Railway Company =

Railway in India

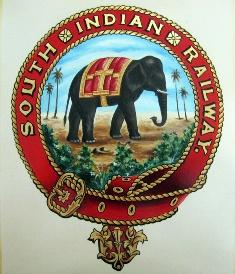

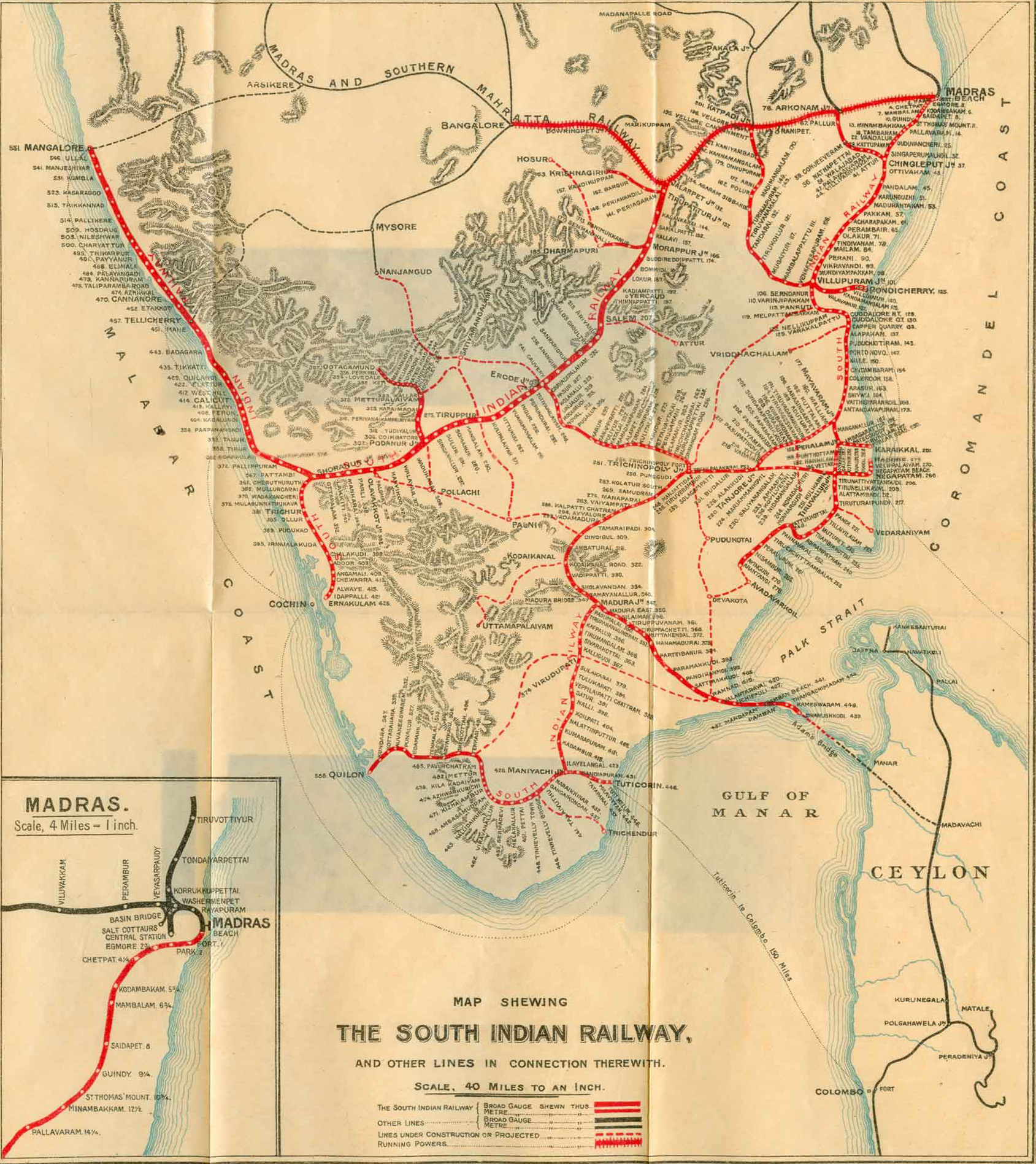
- South Indian Railway map in 1910

Overview
- Headquarters: York Street, Westminster, London, UKGBI (R. O.); Trichinopoly, Madras Presidency, British Raj (Operations)
- Reporting mark: SIR
- Locale: Madras Presidency
- Dates of operation: 1 July 1874–13 April 1951 (76 years, 9 months and 13 days)
- Predecessor: Great Southern Railway of India; Carnatic Railway
- Successor: Southern Railway zone

Technical
- Previous gauge: 1,000 mm (3 ft 3 3/8 in)

The South Indian Railway Company was a rail company that operated in South India from 1874 to 1951. It was labeled as a Class I railway according to Indian Railway Classification System of 1926.

== History ==
The Great Southern of India Railway Company was established with its headquarters in England in 1853. The Carnatic Railway Company was founded in 1869. The two companies merged in 1874 to form the South Indian Railway Company. The new firm was registered in London in 1890 with Trichinopoly as its headquarters. In 1891, the Pondicherry Railway Company (incorporated in 1845) merged with the South Indian Railway Company. Chennai Egmore became the company's terminus in Madras by the 1880s. An increase in traffic led to plans for the construction of a full-fledged terminus in the early 1900s. The company operated a suburban electric train service from May 1931 onwards. The South Indian Railway Company was nationalized in 1944. On 1 April 1951, the South Indian Railway Company, the Madras and Southern Mahratta Railway Company and the Mysore Railway Company were merged to form the Southern Railway zone of the Indian Railways.

== Rolling stock ==
In 1877, the company owned 97 steam locomotives, 366 coaches and 1643 goods wagons. By 1936, the rolling stock had increased to 557 locomotives, 27 railcars, 1610 coaches and 9779 freight wagons.

== See also ==
- 1928 South Indian Railway Strike
