= Governagiri =

- Village
- Location in Tamil Nadu, India Governagiri (India)
- Coordinates: 8.934017°N 78.0270267°E
- Country: India
- State: Tamil Nadu
- District: Thoothukudi

Government
  - Type: Panchayati raj (India)
  - Body: Gram panchayat

Languages
  - Official: Tamil
- Time zone: UTC+5:30 (IST)
- PIN: 628401
- Telephone code: 0461
- Vehicle registration: TN-69
- Nearest city: Tirunelveli, Thoothukudi
- Lok Sabha constituency: Thoothukkudi
- Vidhan Sabha constituency: Ottapidaram
- Climate: 28-42 (Köppen)

Governagiri is a village in Ottapidaram taluk Thoothukudi District Tamil Nadu India.

== Geography ==
Governagiri is located at a distance of 4 km from Ottapidaram, 2 km from Panchalankurichi, 33 km from Thoothukudi, 44 km from Tirunelveli and 128 km from Madurai.

== Notable personalities ==
- Veeran Sundaralinga Kudumbanar
