= Ondiveeran =

Indian freedom fighter

Ondiveeran Pagadai
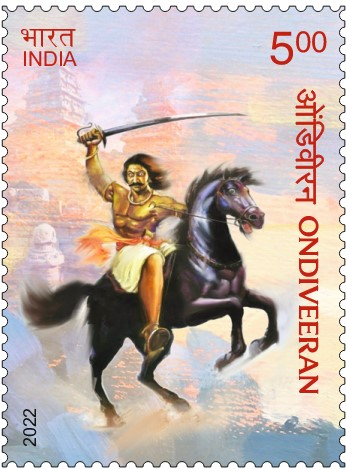
- Born: Ondiveeran Pagadai; Nerkattumseval, Tirunelveli, British India
- Died: 20 August 1771
- Occupation: Freedom fighter

Ondiveeran Pagadai (or Ondi Veeran) (died 20 August 1771) was an Indian commander-in-chief who fought against the British East India Company in Tamil Nadu. He was an Indian soldier who fought against the British East India Company in Tamil Nadu. He is also known by the title Maveeran, which means "great warrior".

== History ==
He was the military leader of Puli Thevar, the king of Tirunelveli. During the time when the Nawab of Arcot was in favor of the East India Company, he allowed the East India Company to collect tribute from the kings of Tamil Nadu. Following this, a large army of the East India Company was prepared for war. However, Puli Devan, the king of Tirunelveli, refused to pay the tribute. It is believed that the British commander sent a message that Pulidevan would not have to pay the tribute if he captured the sword, horse and Perumbaram of the Nawab of Arcot that were kept in the British camp. Accepting the challenge, Pulidevan and his soldiers attacked the British camp. They won the battle. However, Pulidevan and his commander had a grudge against Ondiveeran with the British government, and wars broke out between them. Later, the two armies clashed eleven times, but the British army could not win. The continuous battles and injuries weakened Ondiveeran's health. He was killed in the eleventh battle.

== Praise ==
Ondivira led one of Pulidevar's army units. Fighting alongside Pulidevar, he inflicted heavy losses on the Company's army. According to oral tradition, Pulidevar was upset when Ondivira's hand was cut off in a battle. He said that Ondivira had previously infiltrated the enemy's fort and cut off many heads.

== Memorial ==
In the mid-2000s, the schedule caste of Tamil Nadu petitioned the government to establish a memorial to Ondiveeran. This petitioning included public protests. The foundation stone for the memorial, costing ₹4,900,000, was laid in 2011 by Minister for Information and Public Relations Parithi Ilamvazhuthi. After the Tamil Nadu Arunthathiyar Reservation Act 2009, the Tamil Nadu government built a memorial for him in Tirunelveli district due to pressure from all Arunthathiyar communities. Several public protests were also launched in the community efforts to get a memorial. The foundation stone of the memorial was laid in 2011. Ondiveeran came from the Pagadai community and is viewed by them as a hero.

== Stamp ==
India Post issued a commemorative postage stamp of denomination ₹5, released by Tamil Nadu Governor R.N.Ravi featuring Ondiveeran in 2022.

== See also ==
- Puli Thevar
- Pagadai (ethnic group)
- Arunthathiyar Reservation Act 2009
