= Arunthathiyar =

Dalit caste in South India

- Classification: Scheduled caste
- Religions: Hinduism • Christianity
- Languages: Tamil • Telugu • Kannada
- Country: India
- Populated states: Tamil Nadu • Kerala • Karnataka • Andhra Pradesh
- Region: Northern and western Tamil Nadu
- Ethnicity: South Asian
- Population: 2,150,285
- Subdivisions: Arunthathiyar • Chakkiliyar • Madari • Madiga • Pagadai • Thoti • Adi Andhra

Arunthathiyar is a scheduled caste community mostly found in the Indian state of Tamil Nadu. The term has two distinct usages: for the purposes of the state government's reservation programme, in 2009 it was designated an umbrella term for the Arunthatiyar, Chakkiliyar (Sakkiliyar), Madari, Madiga, Pagadai, Thoti and Adi Andhra communities with a total population of 2,150,285, accounting for 14.89% of the Scheduled Caste population according to the 2011 Census of India. While the Office of the Registrar-General, which administers the census of India, does not recognize all of those communities as one.

Specifically, within the Arunthathiyar caste it is reported that there were 1,084,162 individuals in Tamil Nadu, being 7.52 percent of the Scheduled Caste population of the state.

== Origin ==
Due to their speaking Telugu and lack of mention in early Tamil texts, most scholarly authorities believe the community originated in Andhra Pradesh and migrated to Tamil Nadu in the 17th century. However, the community's own history is that they are originally Tamil kings who ruled the area around Tagadur (Dharmapuri), who were taken as captives in war to Andhra and Karnataka in ancient days and only returned in the 16th century as the Kannada-speaking Madiyars and Tamil-speaking Chakkiliyars. Therefore, they called themselves Adi Tamizhar.

== Occupation ==
The Arunthathiyars, although they never touched dead cattle, still worked leather as leatherworkers and cobblers, and were thus given a low social status in Hinduism Caste system. Many are also landless agricultural labourers and are engaged in bonded labour.

== Current status ==
The vast majority of the community, almost 18.27 lakhs, live in Tamil Nadu, with small minorities in neighbouring states. Small populations live in the Palakkad district of Kerala (40,507), and southern parts of Andhra Pradesh (30,190) and Karnataka (2,959). 62% of the community lived in rural areas, and the literacy rate is 60%.

Many Arunthathiyars in northern Tamil Nadu work as landless agricultural labourers for Naidu landlords, and their women work as domestic help in their houses. Some girls from the community are dedicated to the Mathamma cult, a local village deity tradition.

== Notable people ==
- Madurai Veeran - King and commander-in-chief (Thirumalai Nayakkar Period)
- Ondiveeran - King and commander of an army who fought against the British East India Company in Tamil Nadu
- Veeramangai Kuyili - Kuyili was an army commander of queen Velu Nachiyar. She is considered the first suicide bomber in Indian history
- Rao Sahib L.C. Gurusamy - Member of the round table conference team led by B. R. Ambedkar; founder of Arunthathiyar Mahajana Saba. Member of the Justice Party, social activist and politician.
