= Manjolai labourers massacre =

1999 massacre of tea plantation workers in Tirunelveli, India

- Manjolai labourers massacre (India) Manjolai labourers massacre (Tamil Nadu)
- Location: 8.601962°N 77.264131°E; Tirunelveli, Tamil Nadu, India
- Date: 23 July 1999; 2:40 pm (UTC+5:30)
- Target: Manjolai labourers and general public
- Attack type: Massacre
- Weapons: Lathi-charge, teargas
- Deaths: 17
- Perpetrator: Tamil Nadu Police

The Manjolai labourers massacre or the Thamirabarani massacre of 23 July 1999 was the death of 17 Dalit labourers, including two women and a two-year-old child, when they got into the river to escape a Tamil Nadu Police lathi-charge. Members of the public were going in a procession to Tirunelveli Collectorate to submit a memorandum demanding improved working conditions and pay for the tea plantation workers of Manjolai estate. An altercation between the police and the marchers resulted in a lathi charge by police. When the marchers ran helter-skelter, many fell into the river and died. Human Rights Watch condemned the brutal police attack and killing of Dalit tea plantation workers.

== Background ==
On 23 July 1999, a large number of labourers from Bombay Burmah Trading Corporation Tea estates of Manjolai congregated in Tirunelveli and marched towards the Collectorate demanding the release of a number of estate workers, who were arrested earlier for staging protest demanding better wages. The workers were being paid ₹70 per day then and they were demanding the pay to be increased to ₹100. The workers were also demanding maternity leave and periodic breaks for women during the eight-hour-long duty. They were also opposing the decision of the estate owners to force workers to stay in sheds with poor facilities and denying them the right to rear cattle or grow gardens. A large contingent of stone throwing and lathi-wielding police assaulted the protesters forcing them to run towards the river. As police continued to chase them to the river, many got into the river and drowned. The Justice Mohan Commission that probed the incident found that 11 of the 17 died due to drowning, while rest died due to injuries. Even now, much of their demands have not been met, but the estate workers have since been kept satisfied with a pay of ₹138 per day.

== Documentary film ==
The theme of the incident is the basis for Death of a river (Oru Nathiyin Maranam) a Tamil language documentary film released in 1999. The 59-minute Tamil film is the work of the Kanchanai Film Society, produced and directed by R R Srinivasan.

== See also ==
- Paramakudi riots
- 1957 Ramnad riots
