= 1932 Madras and Southern Mahratta Railway strike =

General strike

The 1932 Madras and Southern Mahratta Railway strike was a general strike launched against the retrenchment policies of the Madras and Southern Mahratta Railway Company. The strike lasted from 24 October 1932 to 8 January 1933 and was moderate and non-violent in character as opposed to the 1928 South Indian Railway Strike which was extremely violent.

== Prelude ==
There were protests against retrenchment policies in the Madras and Southern Mahratta Railway throughout 1931 and early 1932. On 24 October 1932, a major strike erupted in the Mechanical Workshops of the Perambur branch of the Madras and Southern Mahratta Railway company.

== Events ==
The strike began on 24 October 1932 in Perambur demanding the reinstation of 93 railway workers who had been laid off, the previous year. On 3 November, the employees of the engineering workshop at Arakkonam joined in the strike. This was followed by a strike of the employees of engineering and mechanical workshops at Hubli in Bombay Presidency. Consequently, there were strikes in Bezawada, Betragunta and Rajahmundry.

A settlement was eventually reached when the Sheriff of Madras brokered a peace between the Madras and Southern Mahratta Railway and the striking workers. The strike was called off on 8 January 1933 at the instance of Jamnadas Mehta and V. V. Giri.

== Support ==
The Nizam Guaranteed State Railway Workers' Union, the B. N. Railway Labour Union, the jute farmers of Nellimarla, the workers at the Buckingham and Carnatic Mills, the International Transport Workers Federation, British Trade Union Congress, Railway Clerks Association, National Union of Railways of Great Britain and the International Federation of Trade Unions contributed enormous amounts of money for the strike relief fund. The B. N. Railway Labour Union also resolved to observe 13 November 1932 as "M&SM Railway Strike Day".
