= Devendrar Jayanti =

Festival commemorating Immanuel Sekaran

Devendrar Jayanthi (also known as Immanuel Sekaran Jayanthi or Tyagi Immanuel Sekaran memorial day) is an annual observance held on 11 September in southern Tamil Nadu, particularly at the memorial in Paramakudi, Ramanathapuram district. It commemorates the death anniversary of Immanuvel Devendrar (also known as Immanuel Sekaran or Tyagi Immanuel Sekaran), a freedom fighter, former soldier and civil rights activist associated with the Indian National Congress.

The event is organised by various political parties, community organisations and civil society groups, and attracts large gatherings from the Devendra Kula Vellalar (Pallar) community and others. Political leaders across parties routinely pay floral tributes at the memorial.

== Background ==
Gathering at the Immanuel Sekaran memorial on Devendrar Jayanthi

Immanuel Sekaran (1924–1957) participated in the Quit India Movement and later served in the army. After returning to Ramanathapuram district, he worked for the rights of depressed classes, particularly the Pallar community, and was associated with the Congress under K. Kamaraj. Tensions between communities escalated around a 1957 by-election. Sekaran was murdered on 11 September 1957. The violence that followed is known as the 1957 Ramnad (or Mudukulathur) riots.

The anniversary of his death has since been observed annually as Devendrar Jayanthi / Immanuel Sekaran memorial day, especially by the Devendra Kula Vellalar community.

== Observance and memorial ==
Every year on 11 September, large numbers of people gather at Sekaran’s memorial in Paramakudi to pay homage. Family members, community organisations, and leaders from major political parties (including DMK, AIADMK, Congress, BJP, VCK, NTK, AMMK and others) participate.

In September 2023, Chief Minister M. K. Stalin announced the construction of a manimandapam (memorial hall) with a statue at a cost of ₹3 crore. The manimandapam and statue were inaugurated by the Chief Minister in January 2026.

Due to the large gatherings and the sensitive caste context of the southern districts, the police make extensive security arrangements every year, including traffic restrictions and deployment of personnel.

== Criticism ==
The observance has sometimes been criticised as an expression of caste pride that can lead to inter-caste tensions or violence. Authorities routinely impose restrictions (such as Section 144) and deploy heavy security to maintain order.

Supporters argue that the event is a legitimate remembrance of a freedom fighter and social reformer who fought against caste discrimination, and that every community has the right to honour its leaders.
