= Peter Paul Pillai =

Peter Paul Pillai was an Indian schoolmaster, landlord, politician and social reformer who represented Tirunelveli at the first session of the Indian National Congress.

== Personal life ==
Peter Paul Pillai was a Roman Catholic schoolmaster and landowner. Peter Paul Pillai participated in the first session of the Indian National Congress.

== Later life ==
Pillai qualified as a barrister-at-law in 1902. He led the 1885 inquiry into the condition of India and the 1891 forest law.
