= Maruthanayagam Pillai =

Indian military leader

Maruthanayagam
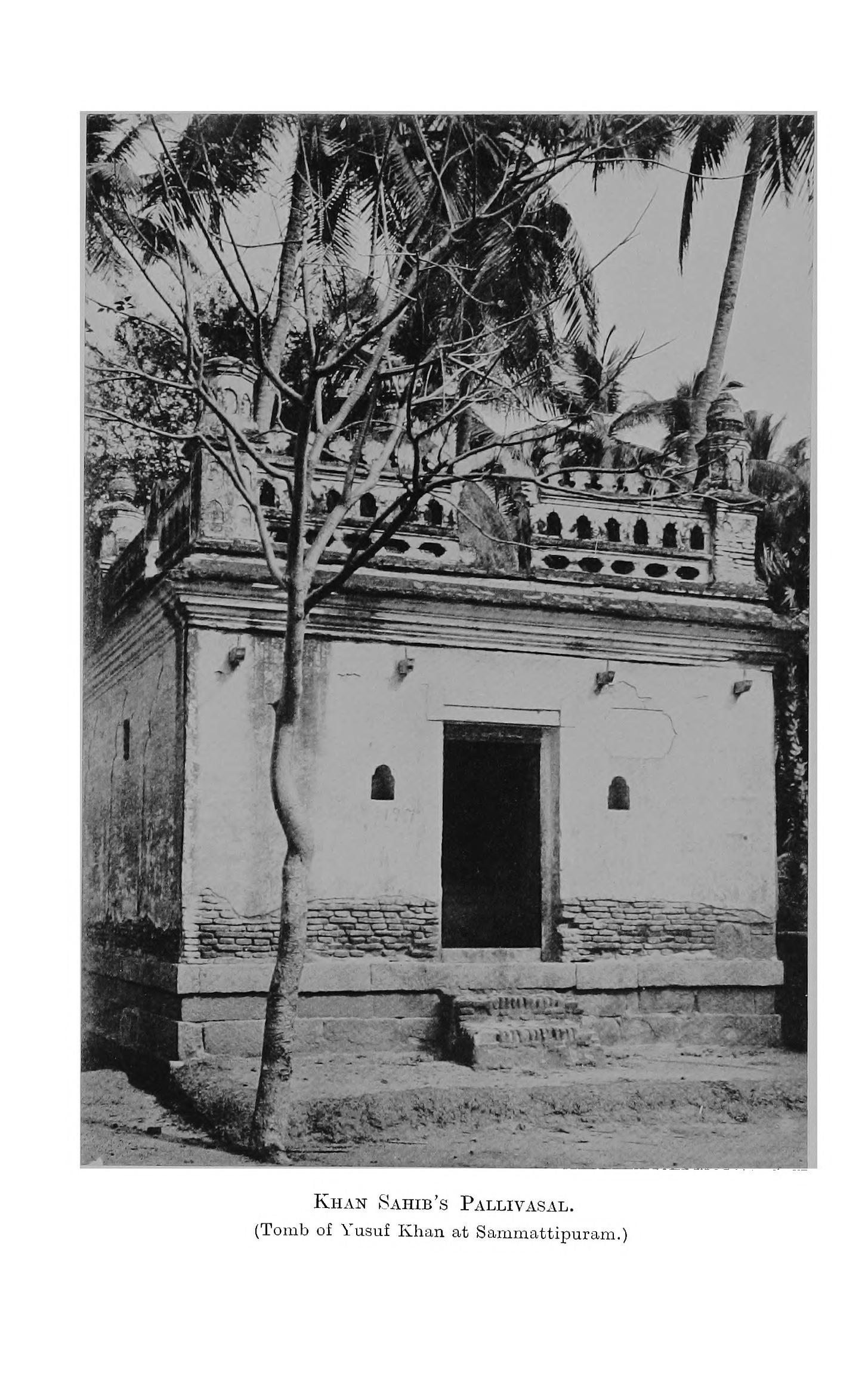
- Khan Sahib's Pallivasal (Tomb) in 1914
- Born: 1725; Keelapanaiyur, Kingdom of Ramnad (now in Ramanathapuram district, Tamil Nadu, India)
- Died: 15 October 1764 (aged 38–39); Sammattipuram, Carnatic Sultanate (now in Madurai, Tamil Nadu, India)
- Cause of death: Execution by hanging
- Burial place: Sammattipuram, Madurai, Tamil Nadu, India
- Military career
- Allegiance: Mughal Empire, British Empire
- Branch: Nawab of Arcot
- Rank: Sepoy, Ispahsalar
- Conflicts: Carnatic Wars

Muhammad Yusuf Khan (born Maruthanayagam Pillai) was a commandant of the British East India Company's Madras Army. He was born in a Tamil Vellalar family in a village called Keelapanaiyur in British India, which is now in Mudukulathur Taluk, Ramanathapuram District of Tamil Nadu, India. He converted to Islam and was named Muhammad Yusuf Khan. He was popularly known as Khan Sahib when he became the ruler of Madurai. He became a warrior in the Arcot troops, and later a commandant for the British East India Company troops. The British and the Arcot Nawab employed him to suppress the Puli Thevar (a.k.a. Palayakkarar) uprising in South India. Later he was entrusted to administer the Madurai country when the Madurai Nayak rule ended.

A dispute arose with the British and Arcot Nawab, and three of Khan's associates were bribed to capture him. He was captured during his morning prayer (Thozhugai) and hanged on 15 October 1764 at Sammatipuram near Madurai. Local legends state that he survived two earlier attempts at hanging, and that the Nawab feared Yusuf Khan would come back to life and so had his body dismembered and buried in different locations around Tamil Nadu.

== Early years ==
Maruthanayagam Pillai was born in 1725 in the village of Keelapanaiyur in a Hindu family of Tamil Vellalar clan, in what is now Ramanathapuram district of Tamil Nadu, India. Philip Stanhope, 4th Earl of Chesterfield – who was in the service of Muhammed Ali Khan Wallajah, the Nawab of Arcot, for three years – mentions in his Genuine Memoirs of Asiaticus that Yusuf Khan was of royal extraction and high descent. 2nd ed, 1785, page 160 The Scots Magazine (1765, page 264) tells of a letter written by a gentleman in the East Indies to a friend in Scotland, from the military camp before Palamcottah, dated 22 October 1764 (a week after his hanging), where in Yusuf Khan is said to be 'descended from the ancient seed of that nation'. According to an ancient Tamil manuscript Pandiyamandalam, Cholamandalam Poorvika Raja Charithira Olungu, the Pandiyan dynasty in Madurai was founded by one Mathuranayaga Pandiyan (Mathuranayagam). Yusuf Khan was believed to be his descendant.

Being too restless in his youth, Yusuf Khan left his native village, and later lived with the company of his martial arts master and converted to Islam. He served the French Governor Jacques Law in Pondicherry. It was here he befriended another Frenchman, Marchand (a subordinate of Jacques Law), who later became captain of the French force under Yusuf Khan in Madurai. Whether Yusuf Khan was dismissed from this job or left on his own is unclear. He left Pondicherry, for Tanjore and joined the Tanjorean army as a sepoy (foot soldier).

== Education and early career ==
Around this time, an English captain named Brunton educated Yusuf Khan, enabling him to become proficient in languages such as Tamil, French, Portuguese, English, Arabic, and Urdu. With his ambition, he learned these languages. He later relocated to Nellur and assumed the titles of magistrate, civil officer, and superintendent. From Tanjore, he moved to Nellore (in present-day Andhra Pradesh), where he pursued a career as a native physician under Mohammed Kamal, in addition to his military career. He progressed through the ranks, starting as a Thandalgar (tax collector), then becoming a Havildar, and eventually achieving the rank of Subedar. This is how he is referred to in English records, as the 'Nellore Subedar' or 'Nellore Subedar.' He later enlisted under Chanda Sahib who was then the Nawab of Arcot. While staying in Arcot he fell in love with a 'Portuguese' Christian (a loose term for a person of mixed Indo-European descent or Luso-Indian) girl named Marcia (Marcia de Carvalho), and married her.

== Carnatic wars ==
In 1751, there was an ongoing struggle for the throne of Arcot, between Muhammed Ali Khan Wallajah, who was the son of the previous Nawab of Arcot Anwaruddin Muhammed Khan, and his relative Chanda Sahib. The former sought the help of British and the latter the French. Chanda Sahib initially succeeded, forcing Muhammad Ali to escape to the rock-fort in Tiruchirapalli which was put under siege. Ensign Robert Clive led a small English force of 300 soldiers on a diversionary attack on Arcot, and Chanda Sahib dispatched a 10,000-strong force under his son Raza Sahib, aided by the Nellore Army of which Yusuf Khan was a Subedar. At Arcot, and later at Kaveripakkam, Chanda Sahib's son was badly defeated by Clive, and Chanda Sahib withdrew and was killed. The East India Company quickly installed Muhammad Ali as the Nawab of Arcot and most of Chanda Sahib's native forces defected to the British.

Under Major Stringer Lawrence, Yusuf Khan was trained in the European method of warfare and displayed a talent for military tactics and strategy. Over the next decade, as the British East India Company continued to fight the French East India Company in the Carnatic Wars, Yusuf Khan's guerrilla tactics, repeatedly cutting the French lines of supply, greatly hampered the French efforts.

By 1760, Yusuf Khan had reached the zenith of his career as the 'all-conquering' military commandant. (A few years earlier he had been given the rank of 'Commandant of Company's sepoys'). His greatest supporter during this period was George Pigot, the English governor in Madras. Yusuf Khan was held in very high esteem even after his death in battle and in the opinion of the British he was one of the two great military geniuses India had ever produced (the other being Hyder Ali of Mysore). Yusuf Khan was regarded for his strategy and Hyder Ali for his speed. Major General Sir. John Malcolm said of him almost fifty years later, "Yusuf Khan was by far the bravest and ablest of all the native soldiers that ever served the English in India". (Note: "Yusuf Khan was by far the bravest and ablest of all the native soldiers ever to serve the English in India.")

== Control of Madurai ==
When Muhammad Ali was installed as the Nawab of Arcot, he owed a significant debt to the British East India Company, to whom he had granted the tax collection rights of the Madurai kingdom. This move led to a conflict between the British and the Polygars, influential feudal administrators who were unwilling to pay taxes to the weak Nawab and refused to recognize British tax collectors. In 1755, in an attempt to quell the rebellious Polygars, the Nawab and the British dispatched an army to the south under the leadership of Col. Heron, along with the Nawab's brother Mahfuz Khan, who was accompanied by Yusuf Khan as his bodyguard. Mahfuz Khan and Heron conducted raids in the countryside, which infuriated Yusuf Khan. He subsequently lodged a complaint with the British authorities, leading to a court-martial of Heron.

There were several instances of rebellion by the Kallars against paying taxes to the Muslim and British invaders. In 1755, Colonel Heron led an expedition against the Poligar of Kumaravadi, Lackenaig (Lakshmi Naik), whose Governor Mayana had taken refuge at the temple of Kovilkudi in Tirumbur Village. Colonel Heron and Yusuf Khan led the soldiers in burning down the temple. During this incident, an idol revered by the Kallars was removed and held for a ransom of Five Thousand Rupees. Since the Kallars were unable to pay, the idol was melted down. This action by Colonel Heron was condemned by the Madras Council of the East India Company as unworthy of an English officer, considering the potential prejudice it might cause among the natives towards England. These events were followed by the Vellaloor Massacre in 1767, in which around 5,000 Kallars were massacred, greatly angering Yusuf.

The East India Company sent Muhammad Yusuf Khan back to Madurai with the promotion of Commando Khan. After taking office as the Governor of Madurai, he started suppressing those who rebelled against the British alliance. In July 1759, he hanged the leader of the Kallars who fought in Madurai and 500 Kallars who fought with him in one day at Thiruparankundram. The punishment given by him was to make the other camp residents afraid.

In March 1756, Yusuf Khan was sent to Madurai to collect taxes and restore order. Madurai was then under control of Barkadthullah (with the support of Hyder Ali of Mysore), who had angered the locals by allowing an old fakir to prepare to build a dargah (Islamic tomb) for himself atop the Madurai Meenakshi Temple. Yusuf Khan arrived with as little as 400 troops, defeating Barkadthullah's large army, forcing him to flee to Sivaganga Zamin with the fakir likewise expelled.

Disturbances continued to prevail in Madurai. The Kallars ravaged the country; Hyder Ali was with difficulty beaten off, and little revenue could be collected. The British failed to convince the Nawab to recall his brother, Mahfuz Khan, who may have been the cause of the trouble. Soon after, to meet their needs elsewhere, they compelled the withdrawal of Yusuf Khan. His departure was the signal for wilder anarchy, and company's garrison in Madurai could only collect taxes from the country directly under its walls in order to support themselves.

The Company later sent Yusuf Khan back, renting both Madurai and Tinnevelly to him for one lakh (100,000 rupees) per annum. Yusuf Khan by the spring of 1759 began cutting roads through the woods to pursue bands of armed robbers plaguing the countryside. Through the relentless pursuit and execution of criminals, he brought the country to order and the Polygars into submission. He also renovated the forts damaged by Hyder Ali. All of these actions increased revenue to the Nawab and British, and made himself extremely powerful.

=== Controversial wars with Palayakkars ===
During this time Yusuf Khan battled with Puli Thevar, a Polygar of Nerkattumseval (a small town to the south-west of Madurai), who was rebelling against the Nawab and the British. Yusuf Khan first convinced the Raja of Travancore to make an alliance with the Nawab, breaking his alliance with Puli Thevar. Yusuf Khan successfully captured some of Puli Thevar's forts where Mohammed Ali had previously failed. However, in 1760, Yusuf Khan faced a minor setback in his attempt to capture Vasudevanallur, one of Puli Thevar's principal forts. He met some backlash by Puli Thevar in some battles, marking the first time in his military career that he had experienced such backlash. Nonetheless, he eventually succeeded in his second attempt. Puli Thevar later escaped from Sankarankovil and vanished from the pages of history for a couple of years. Puli Thevar is today recognized by the Government of Tamil Nadu as a freedom fighter.

Also during this time, Yusuf Khan successfully repulsed an attempt by the Dutch to capture of the town of Alwartirunagari and chased them back to their ships anchored at Tuticorin.

== Dispute with Arcot Nawab ==
As Yusuf Khan's victories accumulated and his reputation grew, the Arcot Nawab became jealous and feared that he might be deposed. To reduce his power, the Nawab ordered that taxes for the region be paid directly to his administration instead of that of Yusuf Khan. British Governor Lord Pigot advised Yusuf Khan to heed the Nawab's wishes, and British traders supported this as they viewed Yusuf Khan as the Nawab's employee. Meanwhile, a scheme was planned by the Nawab and his brother Mahfuz Khan to poison Yusuf Khan.

In 1761, and again in 1762, Yusuf Khan asked to continue leasing Madura and Tinnevelly for an additional four years at seven lakhs (700,000 rupees) per annum. His offer was refused, and shortly afterwards he began to collect troops in an ambition to become lord of Madurai. Some British traders reported to the Nawab and the company, on Yusuf Khan as spending vast sums on his troops. In response, the Nawab and British sent Capt. Manson to arrest Yusuf Khan.

Meanwhile, Yusuf Khan wrote to Sivaganga Zamindari reminding them of their owed taxes. Sivaganga's Minister and General came to Madurai to meet Yusuf Khan, and was rudely warned that certain territories would be annexed for failure of payment. Meanwhile, Ramnad Zamin's general Damodar Pillai and Thandavarayan Pillai complained to the Nawab that Yusuf Khan had plundered Sivaganga villages and begun a cannon manufacturing plant in association with a French Marchaud.

The Nawab and British quickly amassed an army. They brought the Travancore Raja to their cause, and in an ensuing battle, the Travancore Raja was defeated and the British flags in his domains were chopped and burnt, with the French flag hoisted on the Madura Fort.

When Governor Saunders in Madras (now Chennai) called Khan Sahib for a meeting, he refused evoking the wrath of the East India Company. By now, Delhi's shah and Nizam Ali of Hyderabad – the Arcot Nawab's overlords – proclaimed Yusuf Khan as the rightful legal governor of Madurai and Tirunelveli. This left the Nawab and British seeking some legitimacy to capture and kill Yusuf Khan.

== Defensive actions and downfall ==
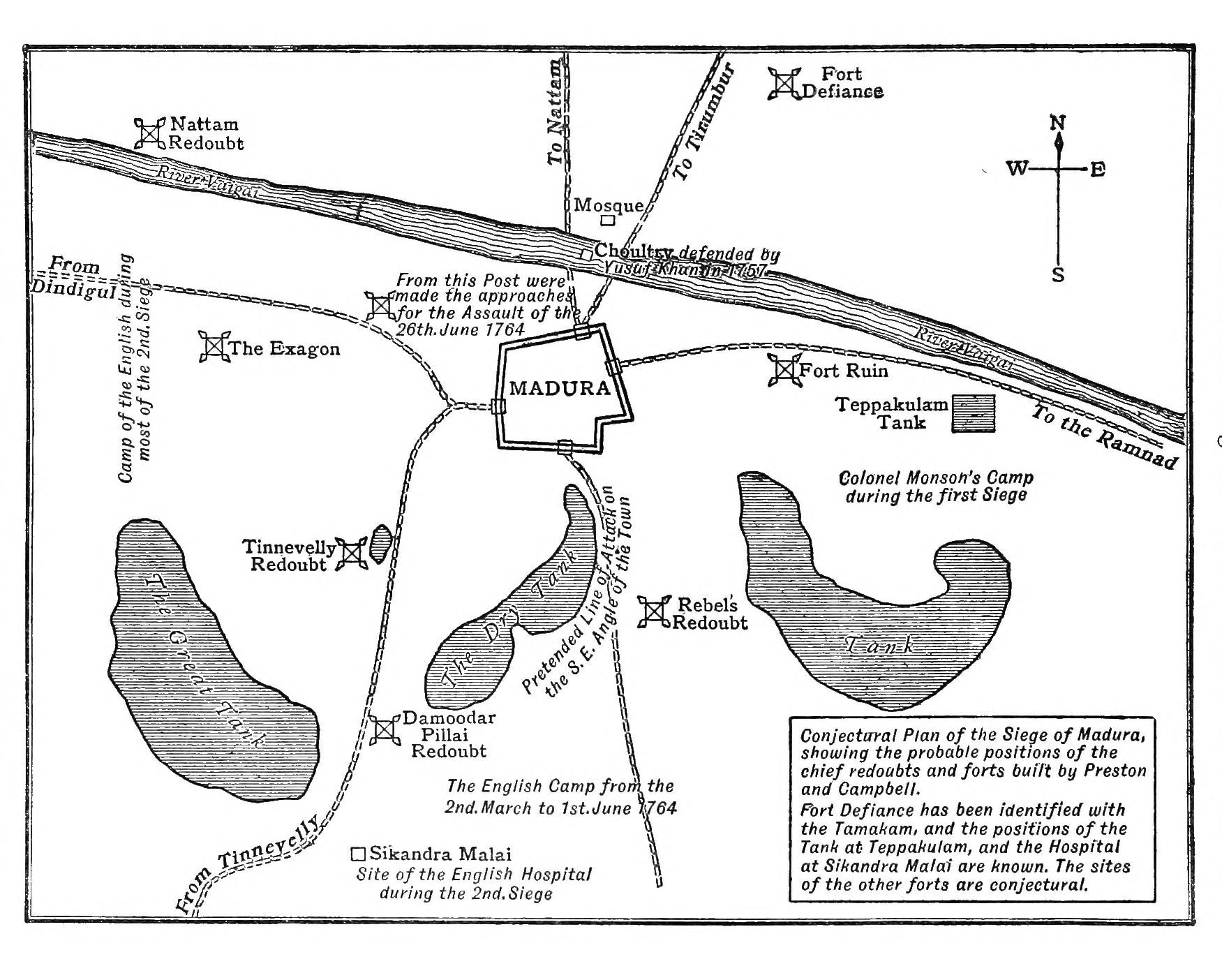
Second Siege of Madurai

Yusuf Khan proclaimed himself the independent ruler of Madurai and Tirunelveli, but had enemies lurking around him. His previous allegiance to the Nawab and British had earned the wrath of Mysore, and the remaining Polygars sought a return to prominence. The Tanjore, Travancore, Pudukkotai, Ramnad, and Sivaganga kingdoms joined with the British and the Arcot Nawab to attack Yusuf Khan. In the first siege of Madurai in 1763, the English could not make any headway because of inadequate forces and the army retreated to Tiruchi due to monsoons. The Nizam Ali of Hyderabad reaffirmed Yusuf Khan as the rightful governor, while the Arcot Nawab and the British issued a warrant for Yusuf Khan "to be captured alive and hanged before the first known tree".

In 1764, British troops again besieged the Madurai Fort, this time cutting supplies. Yusuf Khan and his troops went without food and water for several days (according to European sources, surviving on horse and monkey meat) but held on while strengthening the defenses, and repelled the chief assault with a loss of 120 Europeans (including 9 officers) killed and wounded. Little progress against him had been made, except that the place was now rigorously blockaded.

The Arcot Nawab consulted Sivaganga General Thaandavaraaya Pillai, along with Maj. Charles Campbell, to hatch a plot aimed at bribing three of Yusuf Khan's close associates: Dewan Srinivasa Rao, the French mercenary captain Marchand, and Khan's doctor Baba Sahib.While Yusuf Khan was offering his morning prayers in his house, they quietly captured him and bound him with his own turban. Yusuf Khan's wife rushed to the scene with the house guards, but they were overwhelmed by the well-armed mercenaries. Under the cover of darkness, Marchand brought Yusuf Khan to Campbell, with most of Yusuf Khan's native forces remaining unaware of what had happened.

The next day, on the evening of 15 October 1764, near the army camp at Sammattipuram on the Madurai–Dindigul road, Yusuf Khan was hanged as a rebel by Muhammed Ali Khan Wallajah, the Nawab of Arcot. This place is about 2 miles (3.2 km) to the west of Madura, known as Dabedar Chandai (Shandy), and his body was buried at the spot where he was hanged and a small mosque was erected over his tomb. An inscription describes it as "The Mosque of Khan Saheb."

The Madurai fort, which Yusuf Khan had defended from sieges in 1763 and 1764 was demolished at the end of the nineteenth century.

The fort in Palayamkottai, which he used during his wars with the Polygars, was dismantled in the mid-nineteenth century. Only parts of the western bastion, (now housing Medai Police Station), the eastern bastion (now housing the Tirunelveli Museum) and a few short segments of the eastern wall remain.

== Legends of his death ==
One legend is that he was hanged three times before he finally died. The brief story is that the first two attempts at hanging failed as the rope snapped and only the third attempt was successful. The superstitious Nawab of Arcot Muhammad Ali ordered the body of Yusuf Khan to be dismembered into many parts and buried in different parts of his domain. As the story goes, his head was sent to Trichy, arms to Palayamkottai, and legs to Periyakulam and Tanjore. The headless and limbless torso was buried at Sammattipuram Madurai. In 1808, a small square mosque was erected over the tomb in Samattipuram, on the left of the road to Theni, at Kaalavaasal, a little beyond the toll-gate, and is known as Khan Sahib's Pallivasal.

There are no accounts of Yusuf Khan's wife Marcia and his son of 2 or 3 years following the hanging. According to local tradition, Marcia died soon after her husband's demise and the little boy was brought up in strict secrecy by Srinivasa Rao (Yusuf Khan's Dewan) at Alwarthirunagari. Srinivasa Rao might have felt that the little boy had better chances of surviving where the people were kindly disposed towards Yusuf Khan for repelling a Dutch invasion. As per Marcia's last wish, and to maintain secrecy, Srinivasa Rao named the boy Mathuranayagam (the original Hindu name of Yusuf Khan) and brought him up in the Christian faith. Yusuf Khan's descendants later moved to Palayamkottai.

The descendants of Baba Sahib, Yusuf Khan's physician, live around Krishnan Kovil in Virudhunagar District. They still practice native medicine and bone-setting.

== Character ==
Tradition has many stories to tell of Yusuf Khan, a scion of the ancient Pandyan dynasty, who is said to have started his life as an ordinary peasant and by his military genius rose to the pinnacle of royal power when he became the ruler of the land, only to fall by the treachery of his comrades in arms.

In Tirunelveli and Madurai his whole administration denoted vigour and effect. His justice was unquestioned, his word unalterable, his measures were happily combined and firmly executed, the guilty had no refuge from punishment. Wisdom, vigour and integrity were never more conspicuous in any person of whatever climate or complexion. Author, Col. Fullerton. source, A view of the English interests in India (1785).

== In popular culture ==
Indian actor Kamal Haasan in 1997 started shooting the movie Marudhanayagam portraying Maruthanayagam Pillai in English, French, and Tamil languages. Its filming was stopped soon after, due to financial constraints and political problems. >
