= L. C. Gurusamy =

Rao Sahib L. C. Gurusamy (1885–1966), was an educator, politician, activist and reformer.

He was born in Madiga community to Kottappa at Perambur, Tamil Nadu.

He was one of the founding members of 'Adi Dravida Mahajana Sabha' and later founded ‘Arunthathiyar Mahasabha’ in 1920 with H. M. Jaganathan.

He was nominated to the Madras Legislative Council from 1920 to 1930 and was made Honorary Magistrate in the Labour Court where he served for 22 years.

He also served as Director of a Madras Co-operative Bank, Senator of Madras University and elected to the Madras Municipal Council.

In 1927, British government conferred him with the title of "Rao Sahib" for his contribution towards depressed classes of Tamil Nadu.
