= Keelapanaiyur =

Village in India

- village
- Country: India
- State: Tamil Nadu
- District: Ramanathapuram

Population (2001)
  - Total: 2,024

Languages
  - Official: Tamil
- Time zone: UTC+5:30 (IST)

Keelapanaiyur is a village in the Mudukulathur block of Ramanathapuram district, Tamil Nadu, India.

== Demographics ==
As per the 2001 census, Keelapanaiyur had a total population of 2024 with 946 males and 1078 females. Out of the total population 1155 people were literate.
