= Immanuvel Devendrar =

Indian freedom fighter (1924–1957)

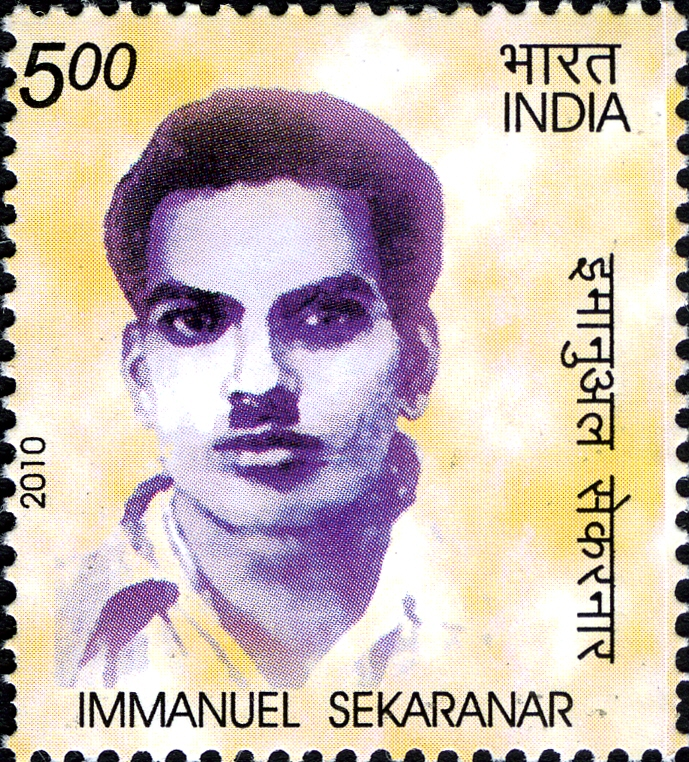
- Sekaranar on a 2010 Indian stamp

Personal details
- Born: 9 October 1924 Sellur (of Mudukulathur), Ramnad District, Madras Presidency, British India (now in Ramanathapuram District, Tamil Nadu, India)
- Died: 11 September 1957 (aged 32) Mudukulathur, Ramanathapuram District, Madras State (now Tamil Nadu), India
- Citizenship: Indian
- Party: Indian National Congress └─ Tamil Nadu Youth Congress
- Spouse: Amritham Grace (m. 1946)
- Children: Mary Vasantharani; Papin Vijaya Rani; Surya Sundari Prabha Rani; Manikavalli Jhansi Rani
- Parent: Vedhanayagam (father)

Military service
- Allegiance: British Empire ├─ British India (1945-47) └─ Dominion of India (1947-50)
- Branch/service: British Indian Army (1945-47); Indian Army (1947-50)
- Years of service: 1945–1950
- Rank: Havildar

Immanuvel Devendrar (9 October 1924 – 11 September 1957), who later took the name Immanuel Sekaran, was a civil rights activist, former soldier and a party worker for the Indian National Congress in Tamil Nadu, India.

== Politics ==
He took part in the Quit India movement from the age of 18 and was imprisoned for three months because of it. In 1945, he enlisted in the British army and, upon his discharge, he returned to his native Ramanathapuram district to work for the Indian National Congress party (INC). His time in the army had caused him to question the oppression of the Pallar caste in his district, which was particularly alarming.

Sekaran worked to improve the education, rights and representation of the Devendra's/Pallars. He tried to mobilise them to demand equality. The INC saw him as a useful opposition to Mottaya Kudumbar, T.V Sasivarna Thevar, velu Kudumbar who had defected from the party to join the Forward Bloc. The party thought that he might be a worthy future member of the Legislative Assembly and groomed him for that end. It was for this reason that he converted to the Hindu religion and took the name Immanuel Sekaranar.

== Assassination ==
The Devendras were often in dispute with the Marava caste and the relationship between the communities became fraught following a by-election in 1957.

Thevar was accused and responsible for the death. Thevar was in fact arrested but later released without charge.

The 1957 Ramnad riots, in which 42 Devendra's were killed, occurred as a consequence of Immanuvel Devendrar's murder.

== Legacy ==
Every year, The Devendrar's Birth day is greatly celebrated as Immanuel anniversary by the people of devendra kula vellala community in and around Ramanathapuram and Sivaganga district. Also his death anniversary is mourned annually as Devendrar memorial day by Devendra Kula community people in his memorial tomb near Paramakudi, Ramanathapuram District of Tamil Nadu.

== See also ==
- Paramakudi Riots
