= Vandiyur Mariamman Temple =

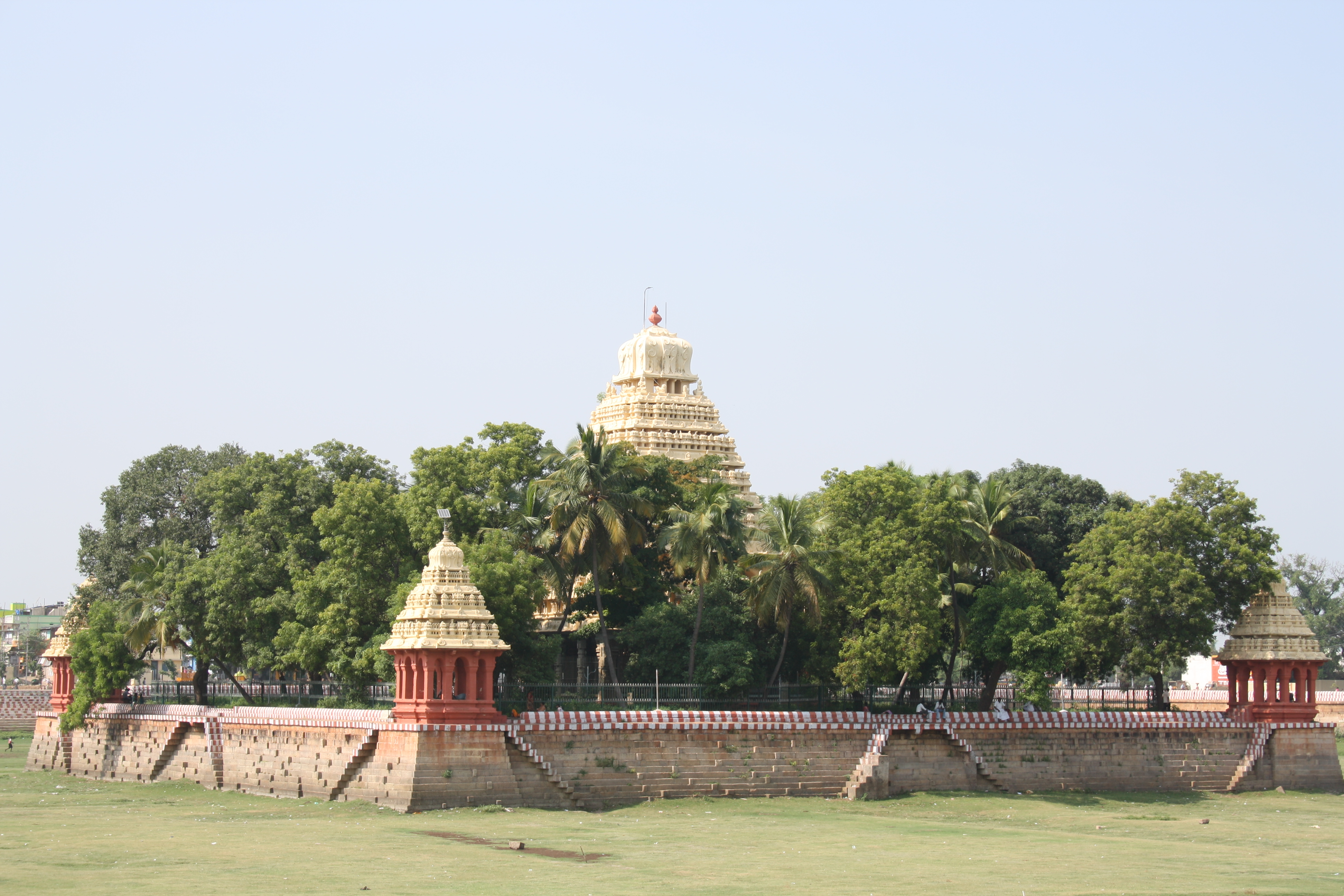
- Vandiyur Mariamman Temple in 2011

Religion
- Affiliation: Hinduism
- District: Madurai
- Deity: Mariamman
- Festival: Teppa Thiruvizha on Thaipusam
- Features: Temple tank: Vandiyur Mariamman Teppakulam

Location
- Location: Vandiyur
- State: Tamil Nadu
- Country: India
- Interactive map of Vandiyur Mariamman Temple
- Coordinates: 9.9104°N 78.1480°E

Architecture
- Type: Dravidian architecture

Vandiyur Mariamman Temple is a Hindu Temple in Madurai, Tamil Nadu, India. It is dedicated to Mariamman. It is located on the banks of the Vaigai River, about 3 km (1.9 mi) from the Meenakshi Amman Temple.

There is a temple tank located near to the temple, and is used during temple festivities. The tank is connected to the Vaigai through a system of underground channels. There are 12 granite steps that lead to the tank, and was built during the reign of the Madurai Nayaks. In the centre of the tank, there is a madapam called Maiya Mandapam (Central Mandapam), which houses a Vinayakar temple and a garden.
