= P. Rangaiah Naidu =

Palavai Rangaiah Naidu (1828–1902) was an Indian lawyer, politician and Indian independence activist. He was an important leader of the Indian National Congress in its early stages.

== Early career ==
Rangaiah Naidu was born in 1828 in a Telugu-speaking family in Madras Presidency. He graduated in law and set up a prosperous vocation as a lawyer. He was soon nominated to the Madras High Court.

== Politics ==
Rangaiah Naidu was one of the many Indian leaders who demanded self-rule and greater representation for Indians in the government. When the Madras Mahajana Sabha was founded in 1884, Rangaiah Naidu was elected as its first President. He was a member of the Madras Legislative Council from 1892 to 1899.

Rangaiah Naidu also participated in the first session of the Indian National Congress held in Bombay in December 1885 representing Madras city. He was one of the trustees for Pachaiyappa's College, Chennai from 1883 to 1902

Rangaiah Naidu was elected to the Madras Legislative Council in 1893 and served as a member from 1893 to 1899. He played a vital role in the Indian Independence movement, from the Tamil speaking districts of the then Madras Presidency.

== Later life and death ==
P. Rangaiah Naidu died in 1902 in Egmore. Two streets in Egmore were named after his father, Veerasamy Naidu and him.
