= C. Jambulingam Mudaliar =

Indian politician and freedom-fighter

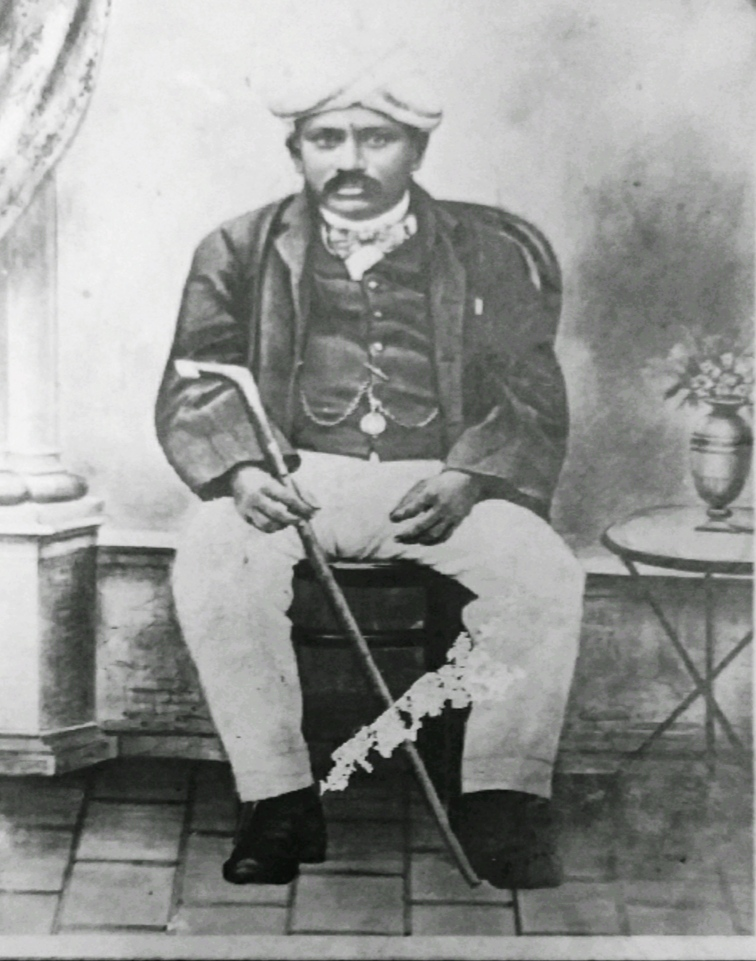
Rao Bahdur C.Jumbulingam Mudaliar B.A., M.L., C.I.E.,

C. Jambulingam Mudaliar CIE (5 December 1857 - 24 January 1906) was an Indian politician and freedom-fighter who served as a civil court judge and member of the Madras Legislative Council. He was one of the foremost leaders of the Indian National Congress in the 1890s.

== Early life ==
Jambulingam studied law and completed his master's in it. He started his practice as a Pleader in Cuddalore and gradually emerged as a judge. He was an important member of the Indian National Congress in the 1890s. In 1893, he was elected to the Madras Legislative Council, one of the first members of the Congress to be elected to the assembly.

== Career ==
Jambulingam was appointed Officiating judge of the Madras city civil court on 12 September 1902. On 26 June 1902, he was made a Companion of the Order of the Indian Empire.

== Indian Independence Movement ==
Jambulingam participated in the tenth session of the Indian National Congress held at Madras in 1894 in which he moved a resolution demanding investigation into Indian finances by a Select Committee of the House of Commons on 28 December 1894. He also participated in the eleventh session of the Indian National Congress. In the fifteenth session of the Congress held at Lucknow, Jambulingam was appointed member of the Indian Congress Committee.
