= Puli Thevar =

- Palaiyakkarar of Nerkattumseval
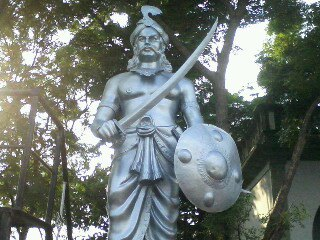
- Puli Thevar Statue in his Nerkattumseval Palace
- Reign: 1 September 1715 – he was defeated by captain Campbell.He escaped Andrew on exile .date was unknown
- Born: 1 September 1715; Nerkattumseval, Madurai Nayak kingdom (Modern Day Tenkasi, Tamil Nadu, India)
- Died: 16 October 1767; Tenkasi, Arcot (Modern Day Tamil Nadu, India)
- Spouse: Kayalkani Nachiyar
- Father: Chitraputra Thevan
- Mother: Sivagnanam Nachiyar

Puli Thevar (1715–1767) was a Tamil Palaiyakkarar who ruled Nerkattumseval, situated in the Sankarankoil taluk, Tenkasi, formerly Tirunelveli Tamil Nadu. He is notable for fighting against East India Company from May 22, 1752 - 1767 in India. His son in law Vadakarai king are the generals of Thevar's army, to fight against the East India Company. He is known for the Polygars revolt against the British. He maintained a good relationship with the Kingdom of Travancore .

"Nerkattum Sevalukku perumai enna?
Neruppaatrai kadandha Pooli Thevanaale"

- Quote about Puli Thevar in Tamil Folk Song

Translation: What brings pride to Nerkattumseval? It is because of Puli Thevar, who crossed the river of fire!
"River of Fire" (நெருப்பாறு): A poetic and metaphorical phrase used to describe the immense hardships, fierce battles, and dangerous paths Puli Thevar braved to protect his land and people..

== Poozhi Nadu ==
Poozhi Nadu was one of the administrative divisions (Aganadugal) of the Pandya Kingdom. This region, which existed from the Sangam period, remained under the rule of the Pandyas. In 1378 CE, a Pandya king who ruled in the Chera region granted this territory to his military commander, Varaguna Raman Chinthamani Kathappa Poozhithevar, as a gift.He belonged to the Appanadu Kondayankottai Maravar lineage. Initially, Avudaiyapuram served as the capital of Poozhi Nadu.During the Nayak period (1529–1564), when the Pandya Kingdom was divided into 72 Palayams (feudal administrative territories), the regions of Poozhi Nadu were incorporated into this system. A few years later, its capital was shifted to Nerkattumseval.During the decline of Nayak rule, the Palayams gradually began asserting their independence.Chithira Puthirathevar was the tenth-generation descendant of Varaguna Raman Chinthamani Kathappa Poozhithevar.

== The Reason Behind the Name 'Nerkattumseval': ==
Puli Thevar would not show even a single grain of paddy, in the name of tax, lease share, or tribute, to the dominant higher authorities or the landlords who took lands on mortgage in his region. Because of this fierce defiance, the village originally known as Aavudaiyapuram came to be called Nerkattumseval

== See also ==
- Alagumuthukone
- Maruthu Pandiyar
- Rani Velu Nachiar
- Periya Kaladi
- Ondiveeran
