= Madapam =

- Village
- Interactive map of Madapam
- Coordinates: 18.376°N 83.997°E
- Country: India
- State: Andhra Pradesh
- District: Srikakulam

Population (2011)
  - Total: 3,094

Languages
  - Official: Telugu
- Time zone: UTC+5:30 (IST)
- Vehicle Registration: AP30 (former); AP39 (from 30 January 2019)

Madapam is a village in Narasannapeta mandal, located in Srikakulam district of the Indian state of Andhra Pradesh.

== Demographics ==
As of 2011 census, the town had a population of 3,094. The total population constitute, 1,551 males and 1,543 females —a sex ratio of 995 females per 1000 males. 295 children are in the age group of 0–6 years, of which 157 are boys and 138 are girls—a ratio of 879 per 1000. The average literacy rate stands at 58.34% with 1,633 literates, significantly lower than the state average of 67.41%.
