= Veeran Sundaralingam =

18th century general from Tamil Nadu, India

Sundaralinga Kudumbanar
- Successor: British Rule
- Died: 1799
- Father: Pandiyan Kattana Karuppanan Kudumbanar
- Religion: Hinduism

Sundaralinga Kudumbanar (died 1799), also known as "Veeran" Sundaralingam Kudumbanar, was an 18th-century CE general from Tamil Nadu, India.

== Fight against British ==
He was a general of the Poligar Veerapandiya Kattabomman in their fight against the British East India Company. .According to a majority of the accepted historical accounts, he was killed in 1799, while fighting for Kattabomman during the First Polygar War. Another view is that he was killed in the Second Polygar War (1800-1) while assisting Kattabomman's younger brother Oomaithurai.

== Legacy ==
In 2009, the Tamil Nadu government-issued a policy note to build a memorial for Sundaralingam at Governagiri. He belonged to the Kudumbanar community, which is a subsect of Devendrakula Velalar caste, an agricultural community found in the Indian state of Tamil Nadu.

== See also ==
- Maruthu Pandiyar
- Periya Kaladi
