= 1928 South Indian railway strike =

The 1928 South Indian railway strike was a general strike by the South Indian Railway Workers Union against plans of the South Indian Railway Company to lay off over 3,100 workers in order to reduce the expenditures of the company. The strike lasted from 29 June – 2 August 1928, and severely affected the transportation of people and goods across South India. The Madras government and the South Indian Railway Company responded with a crackdown. Most of the leaders of the strike were arrested and recognition to the union was withdrawn. The Government of Madras recorded it as the "most important event of the year".

== Prelude ==
In 1927, railway companies all over India took a unanimous decision to reduce their railway workforce in order to cut costs. In response to this decision, strikes were called by the workers of the Bengal–Nagpur railway at Kharagpur in February 1927 and Lilooh in March 1928.

During 1928, there was general discontent among the workers of the South Indian Railway Company over the long working hours, low wages and racial discrimination against native Indians in the railway. At about the same time, the management of the South Indian Railway Company decided to lay off over 3,100 workers to compensate for the purchase of costly machinery in the workshops at Podanur, Negapatam and Trichinopoly. Supporters of the strike have, however, claimed that cost-cut was mainly an excuse and that the real reason for the layoffs was to get rid of extremist elements in the railway union. A Madras government official noted that retrenchment was

... a cloak for victimization of obnoxious workmen particularly those connected with the labour unions

== Events ==
On 28 June 1928, the Central Committee of the South Indian Railway Workers Union telegraphed the management authorities demanding their response to the union's petition to withdraw Circular No. 202 dealing with retrenchment and a general pay raise for both skilled and unskilled workers. The management refused to raise the pay and explained that the lay offs were the result of a government inquiry.

On 29 June 1928, about 8,000 workers in the South Indian Railway workshops in Negapatam, Trichinopoly and Podanur struck work. The union demanded a total wage increase of 25 percent, a minimum wage threshold of Rs. 30 and repeal of Circular No. 202. The management responded with a lockout. The strike also encountered opposition from some of the union leaders, too, notable among them being S. V. Aiyar, editor of the Indian Railway Magazine and President of the Madras and Southern Mahratta Railway Employees Union and Ernest Kirk, General Secretary of the Madras Labour Union who commented

I am not against a strike, but if initiated and rushed and wire-pulled by adherents of Moscow it is severely handicapped from the outset

The striking workers responded by accusing them of "betraying the interests of the workers" and "working against the Central Committee." At a meeting in Trichinopoly on 1 July 1928, Mukundlal Sircar, Secretary of the All India Labour Union, blamed British imperialism for widespread unemployment in India and exhorted railway workers to join hands with the Indian National Congress and participate in the Indian Independence Movement.

There was a total lockout on 6 July 1928 and 9 July 1928 at Trichinopoly and Podanur respectively. Vegetable and fruit shopowners in Trichinopoly had also downed their shutters on 6 July in support of the railway workers. A 3,000-strong procession walked through the town. The situation was calm from 9 July to 18 July when the union tried to negotiate with the management. But when negotiations broke down on 19 July 1928, the strike was resumed in renewed vigour.

The strike turned violent on 20 July and incidents were reported from Tuticorin, Viluppuram, Mayiladuthurai and Trichinopoly. There were clashes between railway workers and policemen in Tuticorin and Mayiladuthurai in which a striker was killed in police firing and 63 others were arrested. This was followed by 78 arrests in Panruti, Vikravandi and Villekuppam. The workers in Viluppuram organised a Satyagraha to press their demands. When a light engine collided against a bus in Trichinopoly causing heavy casualties, a crowd assembled at the spot and catching hold of the light engine driver, a European, lynched him to death.

== End of the strike ==
The strike was brutally suppressed by the government. When about 5000 striking workers in Mayiladuthurai lay on the tracks blocking trains, the police arrested nine workers and stopped the train. Five were killed by the police in Mayiladuthurai in response to an incident of stone pelting and a shepherd named Kone was bayoneted during another stone throwing incident in Tuticorin. Six were killed and twenty-two wounded during a third incident in Viluppuram. A public meeting called by the Madras District Congress Committee in Madras city was prohibited.

Singaravelu Chetty and Mukundlal Sircar were arrested on 23 July 1928. D. K. Pillai, President of the Central Committee was arrested on 25 July followed by T.K. Naidu, Secretary of the Engineering Workshop Labour Union, P. Mudaliar, General Secretary and V. Aujar, Vice President of the Central Committee, on 26 July. On 27 July, nine more leaders of the strike were arrested. The very same day, M. Pillai, Union Secretary at Tinnevely, called off the strike. The strike, however, continued in Trichinopoly and Madura till 30 July 1928, when Krishnamachari, the Secretary of the South Indian Railway Workers' Union, and Pillai, treasurer of the South Indian Railway Local Labour Union, issued a statement formally calling off the strike

We have demonstrated to the public our capacity for organisation and concerted action . . . (but) we find that the public have suffered in this quarrel between Capital and Labour and we are very sorry that we were forced to go on strike much against our wishes . . . relying on the justice of our cause we are determined to continue our fight by peaceful methods and with the sole aim of sparing the public all inconvenience, we have decided to call off the strike from 6 a.m. on the 30th

Minor incidents occurred till 2 August 1928, when the South Indian Railway Workers' Union was officially outlawed.
