= Salem Ramaswami Mudaliar =

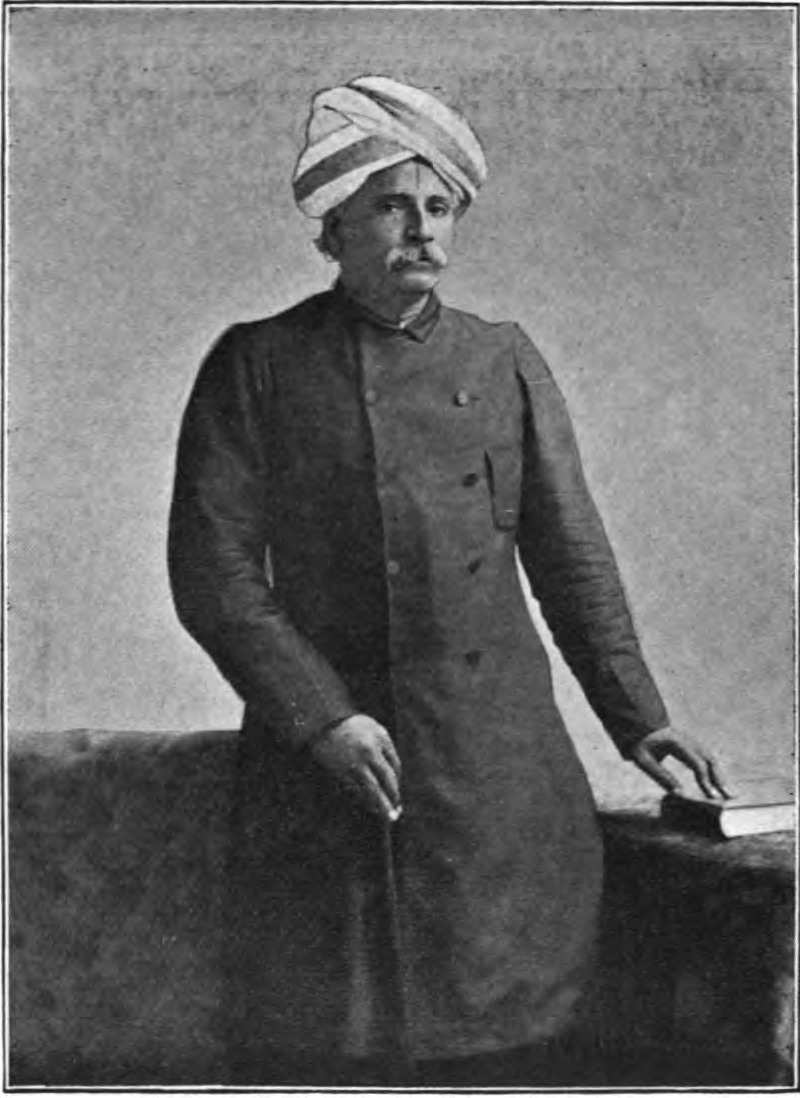
- A portrait of Salem Ramaswami Mudaliar
- Born: 6 September 1852; Salem, British India
- Died: 2 March 1892 (aged 39); Madras, British India
- Education: Madras High School, Pachaiyappa's School, Presidency College, Madras
- Occupation: lawyer
- Known for: political activism, administrator

Salem Ramaswami Mudaliar (6 September 1852 – 2 March 1892) was an Indian lawyer, politician and Indian independence activist who campaigned for India's independence.

== Early life ==
Ramaswami Mudaliar was born in Salem, Madras Presidency, to Salem Gopalaswami Mudaliar a Thuluva Vellala family, who served as the tahsildar of Namakkal. Ramaswami's great-grandfather Vedachala Mudaliar had been a prominent dubash to the British East India Company.

Ramaswami had his schooling at Madras High School and Pachaiyappa's School, Madras and graduated in arts from the Presidency College, Madras in 1871 with high marks in Tamil, English composition and history. Ramaswami excelled in studies and stood among the top fifteen in the province in his matriculation examinations and first in the presidency in his B. A. examinations. On completion of his graduation, Thomson, the principal of the Presidency College, offered Ramaswami an assistant professorship in English.

Ramaswami worked as assistant professor from 1871 to 1873, when he completed his master's degree in history and moral science. Ramaswami then studied law, clearing his examinations in merit and qualifying for the bar in 1875. After initial training as an apprentice under P. O'Sullivan, Ramaswami enrolled at the Madras High Court in 1876.

== Career ==
Ramaswami accomplished great successes as a lawyer. In 1876, he was appointed District Munsiff of Trichinopoly. As District Munsiff, he acquired a reputation for impartiality. A. Seshayya Sastri, once remarked:

Though I have not the pleasure of a personal acquaintance with Salem Ramaswami Mudaliar, M.A., B.L., of the Madras University, I have always heard the best accounts of him as the District Munsiff of Udiarpallium

In 1882, Ramaswami Mudaliar resigned as District Munsiff and moved to Madras to practice in the Madras High Court. He was the founder and chief editor of the Madras Law Journal till 1891. Sir C. Sankaran Nair, V. Krishnaswami Aiyar and P.R. Sundara Aiyar were editors of the journal along with him. In 1892, Ramaswami was appointed fellow of the Madras University.

== Indian independence movement ==
Ramaswami was involved in political activism right from 1882 onwards. There was an attempt to falsely implicate his father in the Salem Riots Case. During the general election of 1885, Ramaswami was chosen as a part of a three-member delegation to present the grievances of Indians before the rulers in the United Kingdom. The delegates visited London, Swansea, Newcastle upon Tyne, Aberdeen, Birmingham, Edinburgh and Aberdeen. Ramaswami halted at Edinburgh on way to Aberdeen to listen to the speech of the liberal leader William Ewart Gladstone while he regarded the speech given by John Bright at Birmingham as the best he had ever listened to in life. Ramaswami's delegation was fairly successful as a Public Service Commission was appointed in 1886 to provide Indian's a greater share in the administration of the country. Ramaswami was nominated as a non-official member of the commission. However, little was achieved as the Indian members of the Commission fought among themselves.

== Indian National Congress ==
Ramaswami joined the Indian National Congress and participated in the 1887 Madras Congress and the 1888 Allahabad Congress. Ramaswami Mudaliar functioned as a member of the Madras Municipal Board at the time of his death on 2 March 1892.
