= Nerkattumseval =

Nerkattaanseval
- Village
- Location in Tamil Nadu, India
- Coordinates: 9.236130°N 77.460640°E
- Country: India
- State: Tamil Nadu
- District: Tenkasi
- Elevation: 165 m (541 ft)

Population (2001)
  - Total: 20,160

Languages
  - Official: Tamil
- Time zone: UTC+5:30 (IST)

Nerkattumseval is traditionally recognized as one of the 72 palaiyams of Madurai Nadu, already in existence in the days of Nagama Nayakar and his son Visvanatha Nayakar. It falls under the Sankarankovil taluk in Tenkasi District of Tamil Nadu.

== Palayam location ==
Netkattumseval palayam is located in the Sankarankovil taluk, in the former Tirunelveli province of the Nayak kingdom of Madurai

== Museum ==
Nerkattumseval has a Memorial Palace for Puli Thevan erected by the Tamil Nadu Government.

- Temples:

Shri Ullamudayar Sastha Temple, Sappani Muthu Temple, Amman temple, Sri vellapandian Temple, Karuppa Swami Temple, Mottaimalai Murugan Temple and Vinayagar Temple, Swami Ramapandian Temple.

== Nearby Palayams ==
- Kollamkondan
- Sivagiri
- Rajapalayam

== Notable people ==
- Puli Thevan
