= Maveeran Alagumuthu Kone =

Indian rebel (1710–1759)

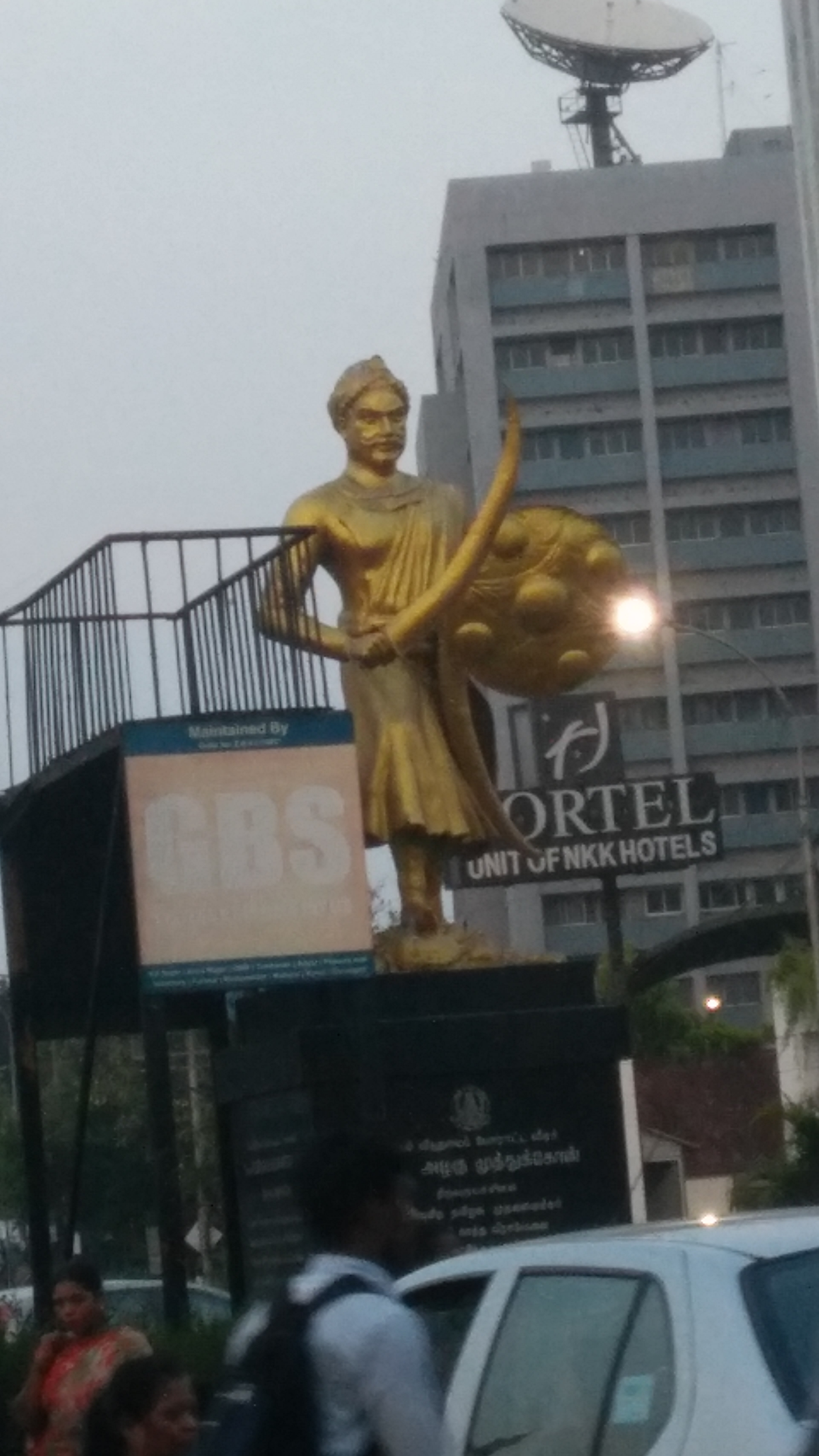
- Alagumuthu Kone statue at chennai
- Born: 11 July 1710; Kattalankulam, Thoothukudi
- Died: 18 November 1759 (aged 0); Nadukaatur, Arcot
- Known for: Resistance to the British East India Company

Maveeran Azhagumuthu Kone (11 July 1710 – 18 November 1759) was first indian freedom fighter, from Kattalankulam in Thoothukudi District. He was an Indian polygar who revolted against the British presence. He belongs to the Konar community. In Tamil Nadu, he waged a war against the Presidency armies in 1750–1759.

He became a military leader in the town of Ettayapuram and ruler of Kattalangulam. In 1755, the Azhagumuthukone, the war force of Azhagumuthukone along with the Travancore force fought against Colonel Eron Keran's army and won. Azhagumuthu kone was defeated in battle against the British forces in 1759. Azhagumuthukone stood smiling in front of the cannons and was blasted by the cannon and shattered into hundreds over thousands of pieces.

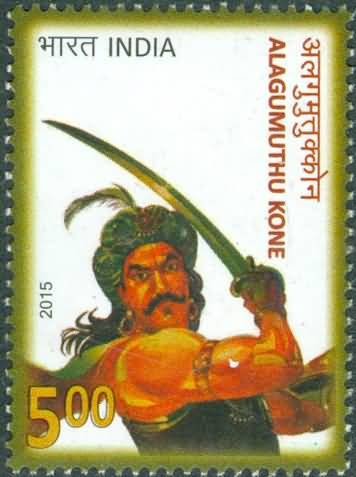
2015 postal stamp.

== Legacy ==
In his memory, the government of Tamil Nadu conducts a Pooja ceremony every year on 11 July. A documentary film based on his life was released in 2012.

As a tribute to Maveeran Azhagumuthu Kone, the Government of India released a Postage Stamp featuring him on 26 December 2015, to remember his great legacy.
