= Paramakudi riots =

2011 riots in Tamil Nadu, India

The Paramakudi riots were a series of riots that happened from 10 to 13 September 2011 in Paramakudi, in the Ramanathapuram district. The riots were held in response to the detention of Tamizhaga Makkal Munnetra Kazhagam (TMMK) leader John Pandian who was detained while heading to Paramakudi to commemorate the 54th death anniversary of Immanuvel Devendrar, a revolutionary leader from the Devendrakulam caste.

== Violence ==
On 11 September, the second day of rioting, five rioters were killed and 50 injured. Two later died of their injuries. Hundreds of policemen were injured. Deputy Inspector-General of Police, Sandeep Mittal and Superintendent of Police, K. A. Senthilvelan and DSP Ganesan were grievously injured in the stone-pelting. According to district collector Arun Roy, the police opened fire when the mob refused to disperse after an attempt to use tear gas. According to Chief Minister of Tamil Nadu Jayalalithaa Jayaram, "What happened at Paramakudi was unfortunate and we are forming an inquiry commission under a retired high court judge to probe the whole incident". Justice Sampath commission justified the police firing without which there would have been loss of lives and state property. The report suggested that sensitive caste gatherings must be avoided.
