= Adi Andhra =

Caste in South India

Adi-Andhra
- Religions: Hinduism; Christianity
- Languages: Telugu
- Populated states: Andhra Pradesh • Telangana • Karnataka
- Ethnicity: Telugus

Adi-Andhra is a Telugu caste found in the Indian states of Andhra Pradesh and Telangana, primarily in the Coastal Andhra region. They are categorised as a Scheduled Caste by the Government of India.

Adi-Andhra literally means 'the original people of Andhra'. The Adi-Andhra group is a composite caste that consists of about 60% of Malas and 40% of Madigas, who belong to the second and third generation of educated scheduled castes. Many Adi-Andhras are engaged in modern occupations created by western education. A small section of Adi-Andhra also lives in Karnataka and Tamil Nadu.

As per the 2001 census, Adi-Andhra constituted 9% of the total Scheduled Caste (SC) population of United Andhra Pradesh. As per the 1981 census, Adi-Andhras had the highest literacy rate among the Dalit castes of Andhra Pradesh. They are the most advanced group in terms of education and employment among the SCs in Andhra Pradesh.

== History ==
Bhagya Reddy Varma (originally Madari Bhagaiah), a Mala from Hyderabad state, was a pioneer of the Adi-Hindu movement in Andhra. In November 1917, he was invited to preside over the 'First Andhra Panchama Mahajana Sabha' at Vijayawada. It was convened by Guduru Ramachandra Rao, a Brahmin social reformer from Krishna district. In his presidential address, Bhagya Reddy remarked that the Depressed Classes were the original inhabitants of India and ought to be called Adi-Hindu, instead of Panchama. Consequently, the conference adopted the name of Adi-Andhra Mahajana Sabha. It was very active in Andhra and met in several conferences.

After the first Adi Andhra conference, the Adi identity gained popularity among Dalits. The government accepted the nomenclature of Adi-Andhra vide order No. 617 on 25 March 1922. Some of the educated Dalits and those who were part of the Adi movements adopted Adi identity, leaving behind their traditional caste names. By the 1931 census, nearly a third of Malas and Madigas of Madras Presidency had given their identity as Adi-Andhra.

== See also ==
- List of Scheduled Castes in Andhra Pradesh & Telangana
