= Madari =

Dalit community in India

Madari is a Dalit community found in Indian subcontinent who were engaged in the profession of street performance, particularly showing shows with monkeys and bears, and Snake charming. They are recognized as Scheduled Castes in Delhi, Karnataka, Madhya Pradesh, Maharashtra, Odisha, Rajasthan, and Tamil Nadu.

Their lifestyle is similar to the Nat and Bazigar people, living nomadic lifestyle and earning livelihood by street performance. In states of Madhya Pradesh, Maharashtra and Karntaka, they are counted with Mang (or Matangs). The Madaris are predominantly Hindus, and those who are Muslims are followers of Badi' al-Din.

== See also ==
- Kalbelia
