= List of Scheduled Castes in Bihar =

Dalit castes in Bihar list

This article has the list of Schedule Castes in Bihar. As of 2011 census of India, they make up 15.9% of state's population.

== List ==
1. Bantar
2. Bauri
3. Bhogta
4. Bhuiya
5. Bhumij
6. Chamar, Mochi, Chamar-Rabidas, Chamar-Ravidas, Chamar-Rohidas, Charmarkar
7. Chaupal
8. Dabgar
9. Dhobi, Rajak
10. Dom, Dhangad, Bansphor, Dharikar, Dharkar, Domra
11. Dusadh, Dhari, Dharhi
12. Ghasi
13. Halalkhor
14. Hari, Mehtar, Bhangi
15. Kanjar
16. Kurariar
17. Lalbegi
18. Musahar
19. Nat
20. Pan, Sawasi, Panr
21. Pasi
22. Rajwar
23. Turi

== Demographics ==
=== Community wise ===
Scheduled Castes		Total population	
Code	Caste	Population	%age of total SC population
001	Bantar	135,175	0.816
002	Bauri	2,233	0.013
003	Bhogta	15,103	0.091
004	Bhuiya	716,269	4.323
005	Bhumij	1,567	0.009
006	Chamar	4,900,048	29.576
007	Chaupal	79,728	0.481
008	Dabgar	5,488	0.033
009	Dhobi	747,528	4.512
010	Domba, (including Chandala)	194,596	1.175
011	Dusadh, Paswan	4,945,165	29.849
012	Ghasi	354	0.002
013	Halalkhor	5,435	0.033
014	Hari, Mehtar	207,549	1.253
015	Kanjar	2,760	0.017
016	Kurariyar, Kureel	10,269	0.062
017	Lal Begi	1,039	0.008
018	Musahar	2,725,114	16.449
019	Nat	58,819	0.355
020	Pano	2,195	0.013
021	Pasi	880,738	5.316
022	Rajuar	285,485	1.723
023	Turi	30,497	0.184
Generic castes, etc		614,171	3.707
	TOTAL	16,567,325	100.00%

=== District wise ===
District		Scheduled Castes		
Name	Population (2011)	Popoulation	%age	Top 5 largest (by pop)
Araria	2,811,569	382,684	13.61	Musahar (203,983); Dusadh (85,915); Chamar (36,190); Bantar (16,566); Dhobi (9,136)
Arwal	699,000	141,314	20.22	Dusadh (51,307); Chamar (41,515); Pasi (15,665); Rajwar (10,178); Musahar (9,999)
Aurangabad	2,540,073	612,064	24.09	Chamar (208,280); Dusadh (197,761); Bhuiya (87,886); Dhobi (41,467); Rajwar (24,656)
Banka	2,034,763	247,858	12.18	Chamar (123,723); Dusadh (37,281); Musahar (19,462); Dhobi (15,871); Dom (11,561)
Begusarai	2,970,541	432,270	14.55	Dusadh (232,118); Chamar (67,981); Musahar (56,096); Dhobi (29,079); Pasi (24,745)
Bhagalpur	3,037,766	318,569	10.49	Chamar (117,831); Dusadh (94,570); Musahar (31,738); Dhobi (26,161); Pasi (14,850)
Bhojpur	2,728,407	425,402	15.59	Dusadh (141,646); Chamar (140,648); Musahar (48,578); Pasi (27,400); Dhobi (24,400)
Buxar	1,706,352	251,737	14.75	Chamar (147,807); Dusadh (56,320); Dhobi (13,117); Musahar (8,810); Pasi (7,354)
Darbhanga	3,937,385	615,688	15.64	Dusadh (229,466); Chamar (131,712); Musahar (124,249); Chaupal (29,263); Bantar (26,368)
East Champaran	5,099,371	649,726	12.74	Chamar (261,962); Dusadh (204,944); Musahar (71,818); Dhobi (56,646); Pasi (12,622)
Gaya	4,391,418	1,334,351	30.38	Bhuiya (581,749); Dusadh (235,076); Chamar (214,567); Pasi (121,214); Musahar (70,299)
Gopalganj	2,562,012	320,064	12.49	Chamar (174,493); Dusadh (64,717); Dhobi (31,470); Musahar (19,483); Pasi (4,874)
Jamui	1,760,405	302,649	17.19	Musahar (104,852); Chamar (89,105); Dusadh (51,581); Dhobi (13,118); Pasi (12,225)
Jehanabad	1,125,313	222,974	19.81	Dusadh (60,759); Chamar (63,524); Musahar (52,304); Pasi (28,246); Dhobi (3,110)
Khagaria	1,666,886	247,161	14.83	Musahar (101,034); Dusadh (68,988); Chamar (48,721); Dhobi (13,586); Pasi (3,554)
Kishanganj	1,690,400	113,118	6.69	Hari (32,877); Musahar (23,466); Dusadh (14,512); Chaupal (11,047); Chamar (9,961)
Kaimur	1,626,384	369,088	22.69	Chamar (234,424); Dusadh (53,416); Pasi (22,026); Musahar (19,391); Dhobi (15,067)
Katihar	3,071,029	263,100	8.57	Musahar (80,550); Dusadh (51,452); Hari (49,918); Chamar (33,243); Dhobi (10,140)
Lakhisarai	1,000,912	153,209	15.31	Dusadh (51,228); Musahar (50,771); Chamar (21,131); Dhobi (11,681); Pasi (8,361)
Madhubani	4,487,379	587,158	13.08	Dusadh (200,378); Chamar (161,254); Musahar (133,715); Dhobi (24,001); Dom (9,162)
Munger	1,367,765	183,846	13.44	Dusadh (63,353); Musahar (44,795); Chamar (39,645); Dhobi (11,599); Pasi (9,313)
Madhepura	2,001,762	346,275	17.30	Musahar (174,453); Chamar (66,081); Dusadh (60,342); Bantar (17,282); Dhobi (10,566)
Muzaffarpur	4,801,062	751,975	15.66	Chamar (277,723); Dusadh (259,972); Musahar (76,425); Dhobi (44,170); Bantar (43,487)
Nalanda	2,877,653	607,672	21.11	Dusadh (251,103); Chamar (125,212); Musahar (94,843); Pasi (84,551); Dhobi (12,466)
Nawada	2,219,146	565,112	25.46	Rajwar (156,770); Musahar (155,497); Pasi (85,106); Chamar (72,639); Dusadh (49,118)
Patna	5,838,465	920,918	15.77	Dusadh (343,150); Chamar (239,272); Musahar (118,864); Pasi (112,726); Dhobi (37,607)
Purnia	3,264,619	390,991	11.98	Musahar (209,448); Dusadh (68,352); Chamar (39,308); Hari (16,726); Dhobi (10,227)
Rohtas	2,959,918	549,546	18.57	Chamar (211,095); Dusadh (187,674); Dhobi (33,111); Pasi (29,077); Rajwar (27,237)
Saharsa	1,900,661	317,249	16.69	Musahar (153,497); Dusadh (64,926); Chamar (62,566); Dhobi (11,314); Pasi (10,518)
Samastipur	4,261,566	803,128	18.85	Dusadh (367,316); Chamar (229,926); Musahar (83,541); Pasi (42,054); Dhobi (34,381)
Sheohar	656,246	96,655	14.73	Chamar (36,811); Dusadh (34,286); Musahar (9,869); Dhobi (9,523); Pasi (1,097)
Sheikhpura	634,927	131,115	20.65	Dusadh (51,500); Musahar (33,436); Chamar (21,084); Pasi (17,785); Dhobi (2,925)
Saran	3,951,862	474,066	11.99	Chamar (215,656); Dusadh (156,219); Dhobi (19,372); Pasi (20,034); Musahar (12,948)
Sitamarhi	3,423,574	405,714	11.85	Dusadh (145,611); Chamar (133,477); Musahar (55,836); Dhobi (39,249); Pasi (9,355)
Supaul	2,229,076	354,249	15.89	Musahar (107,186); Chamar (81,413); Dusadh (79,470); Bantar (56,384); Dhobi (6,979)
Siwan	3,330,464	386,685	11.61	Chamar (217,088); Dusadh (95,033); Dhobi (24,363); Pasi (10,123); Musahar (8,636)
Vaishali	3,495,021	738,031	21.12	Dusadh (393,182); Chamar (219,891); Musahar (41,849); Dhobi (31,787); Pasi (25,594)
West Champaran	3,935,042	553,944	14.08	Chamar (283,082); Musahar (97,831); Dusadh (91,123); Dhobi (29,171); Dom (12,232)

=== Religion wise ===
Scheduled Castes	Total population (2011)	Population by religion		
Scheduled Castes	Total population (2011)	Hinduism	Sikhism	Buddhism
Bantar	135,175	135,160	10	5
Bauri	2,233	2,233	0	0
Bhogta	15,103	15,099	2	2
Bhuiya	716,269	716,106	83	80
Bhumij	1,567	1,567	0	0
Chamar	4,900,048	4,898,020	484	1,544
Chaupal	79,728	79,720	6	2
Dabgar	5,488	5,488	0	0
Dhobi	747,528	747,293	67	168
Domba, (including Chandala)	194,596	194,539	11	46
Dusadh, Paswan	4,945,165	4,944,219	514	432
Ghasi	354	354	0	0
Halalkhor	5,435	5,431	3	1
Hari, Mehtar	207,549	207,512	26	11
Kanjar	2,760	2,759	1	0
Kurariyar, Kureel	10,269	10,269	0	0
Lal Begi	1,039	1,039	0	0
Musahar	2,725,114	27,24,809	196	109
Nat	58,819	58,776	35	8
Pano	2,195	2,193	1	1
Pasi	880,738	880,614	62	62
Rajuar	285,485	285,447	25	13
Turi	30,497	30,487	5	5
Generic castes, etc	614,171	614,011	64	96
TOTAL	16,567,325	16,563,145	1,595	2,585
