= List of Scheduled Castes in Jharkhand =

This articles contain list of Scheduled Castes recognized in Jharkhand.

There are 22 communities recognized as Scheduled Castes in Jharkhand, which is with accordance to 'The Constitution (Scheduled Castes) Order, 1950' for Bihar. After the separation of Jharkhand, the list was modified as per 'The Constitution (Scheduled Castes) Orders (Amendment) Act, 2002'.

As of 2011 census of India, there were 39,85,644 members of Schedule castes which accounts for 12.08% of state's total population.

== List ==
1. Bantar
2. Bauri
3. Bhogta
4. Bhuiya
5. Chamar, Mochi
6. Chaupal
7. Dabgar
8. Dhobi
9. Dom, Dhangad
10. Dusadh, Dhari, Dharhi
11. Ghasi
12. Halalkhor
13. Hari, Mehtar, Bhangi
14. Kanjar
15. Kurariar
16. Lalbegi
17. Musahar
18. Nat
19. Pan, Sawasi
20. Pasi
21. Rajwar
22. Turi

== Demographics ==
=== Caste wise ===
Scheduled Castes		Population	
Code	Community (Caste)	Total (as of 2011)	%age of total
001	Bantar	353	0.009
002	Bauri	1,86,356	4.676
003	Bhogta	2,23,453	5.606
004	Bhuiya	8,48,151	21.280
005	Chamar, Mochi	10,08,507	25.303
006	Chaupal	632	0.016
007	Dabgar	4,378	0.109
008	Dhobi	2,51,686	6.315
009	Doma, Dhangad	1,68,058	4.216
010	Dusadh, Dhari, Dharhi, Paswan	4,24,330	10.646
011	Ghasi	1,50,520	3.776
012	Halalkhor	580	0.014
013	Hari, Mehtar, Bhangi	58,242	1.461
014	Kanjar	405	0.010
015	Kurariar	1,475	0.037
016	Lal Begi	1,240	0.031
017	Musahar	53,096	1.332
018	Nat	1,286	0.032
019	Pano, Sawasi	26,459	0.664
020	Pasi	72,357	1.815
021	Rajwar	1,96,320	4.925
022	Turi	1,98,344	4.976
GENERIC CASTES (members identifying them as 'Anusuchit Jati', 'Dalit' or 'Harijan')		1,09,416	2.751
		39,85,644	100%

=== District wise ===
District		Scheduled Castes		
Name	Population (2011)	Population	Percent	Top 3 (largest by population)
Garhwa	1,322,784	319,946	24.19	Chamar (112,194); Bhuiya (88,035); Dusadh (60,687)
Chatra	1,042,886	340,553	32.65	Bhuiya (173,045); Bhogta (76,319); Chamar (40,021)
Koderma	716,259	109,003	15.22	Chamar (42,230); Dusadh (17,349); Dhobi (11,559)
Giridih	2,445,474	325,493	13.31	Chamar (152,034); Turi (60,167); Dusadh (39,214)
Deoghar	1,492,073	190,036	12.74	Chamar (87,341); Dusadh (21,811); Musahar (16,356)
Godda	1,313,551	115,567	8.80	Chamar (45,819); Dusadh (16,937); Dom (12,716)
Sahebganj	1,150,567	72,341	6.29	Chamar (13,268); Dusadh (11,332); Rajwar (8,024)
Pakur	900,422	28,469	3.16	Chamar (8,371); Dom (4,972); Bhuiya (3,566)
Dhanbad	2,684,487	437,309	16.26	Bauri (85,368); Chamar (75,188); Bhuiya (66,387)
Bokaro	2,062,330	299,227	14.51	Chamar (60,552); Rajwar (54,927); Bauri (45,774)
Lohardaga	461,790	15,330	3.32	Chamar (6,267); Dom (2,113); Turi (1,824)
West Singhbhum	1,502,338	111,414	7.42	Ghasi (24,724); Dhobi (21,870); Bhuiya (16,043)
Palamu	1,939,869	536,382	27.65	Bhuiya (194,816); Chamar (157,806); Dusadh (103,478)
Latehar	726,978	154,910	21.31	Bhuiya (57,389); Bhogta (50,165); Dusadh (7,223)
Hazaribagh	1,734,495	303,515	17.49	Bhuiya (117,997); Chamar (82,333); Dusadh (32,612)
Ramgarh	949,443	106,356	11.21	Chamar (21,298); Bhuiya (18,192); Ghasi (14,316)
Dumka	1,321,442	79,614	6.02	Chamar (24,159); Dom (22,536); Bhuiya (7,341)
Jamtara	791,042	72,885	9.21	Bauri (28,177); Chamar (16,120); Dom (12,302)
Ranchi	2,914,253	152,943	5.25	Ghasi (35,178); Dhobi (21,275); Bhogta (20,451)
Khunti	531,885	24,037	4.52	Ghasi (7,781); Pan (5,097); Bhogta (4,525)
Gumla	1,025,213	32,459	3.17	Ghasi (12,588); Turi (5,456); Bhogta (3,868)
Simdega	599,578	44,674	7.45	Bhogta (13,725); Ghasi (9,975); Bhuiya (9,953)
East Singhbhum	2,293,919	56,986	2.48	Bhuiya (20,389); Ghasi (12,019); Pan (7,621)
Seraikela Kharsawan	1,065,056	56,195	5.28	Bhuiya (20,026); Ghasi (10,436); Dom (8,759)

=== Religion wise ===
Scheduled Castes		Religious community		
Community (Caste)	Population	Hinduism	Sikhism	Buddhism
Bantar	353	351	0	12
Bauri	1,86,356	1,86,331	12	13
Bhogta	2,23,453	2,23,427	18	8
Bhuiya	8,48,151	8,48,045	48	58
Chamar, Mochi	10,08,507	10,07,408	95	1,004
Chaupal	632	631	1	0
Dabgar	4,378	4,378	0	0
Dhobi	2,51,686	2,51,534	107	45
Doma, Dhangad	1,68,058	1,68,005	34	13
Dusadh, Dhari, Dharhi, Paswan	4,24,330	4,24,204	28	98
Ghasi	1,50,520	1,50,397	113	10
Halalkhor	580	580	0	0
Hari, Mehtar, Bhangi	58,242	58,165	72	5
Kanjar	405	401	4	0
Kurariar	1,475	1,470	1	4
Lal Begi	1,240	1,232	8	0
Musahar	53,096	53,088	5	3
Nat	1,286	1,274	12	0
Pano, Sawasi	26,459	26,447	9	3
Pasi	72,357	72,339	14	4
Rajwar	1,96,320	1,96,273	24	23
Turi	1,98,344	1,98,306	17	21
Generic castes, etc.	1,09,416	1,09,353	47	22
	39,85,644	39,83,639	669	1,346
