= Pasi =

Pasi may refer to:

== People and language ==
- Pasi (caste), a Hindu caste of northern India
  - Pasi (surname), a surname of the Pasi community
- Pasi (given name), Finnish masculine given name
- Pasi language, a Sepik language of Papua New Guinea
- Pasi, a subgroup of the Adi people of the Eastern Himalayas
  - Pasi, a variety of the Sino-Tibetan Adi language

== Places ==
- Pasi, Papua New Guinea, a settlement near the coast of Sandaun Province, Papua New Guinea
- PASI, ICAO code for the Sitka Rocky Gutierrez Airport, in Sitka, Alaska

== Other uses ==
- Philippine Animation Studio Inc., an animation studio in Makati City, Philippines
- Pasi (film), a 1979 Tamil film

== See also ==
- Patria Pasi, a Finnish-made armoured personnel carrier (APC)
- Turuk Pasi, a Muslim community of Bihar, India
- Passi (disambiguation)
- Passy (disambiguation)
