= Pasi (surname) =

Origin
- Languages: Hindi, Punjabi, Sanskrit, English

Other names
- Alternative spelling: Passi

The name Pasi (Hindi: पासी) is composed of two words Pa (grip) and asi (sword), implying thereby one who hold a sword in his hand or in other words a soldier. Another etymology is that the name comes from the Sanskrit pashika, "one who uses a noose." The Pasi are said to have used nooses for climbing trees.

In Italian, it stems from the word pace, meaning peace. It is also a Finnish forename, a form of Basil.

Pasi is a surname used by the Pasi community and people from Punjab. Notable individuals with this surname are listed below.

- Geeta Pasi, an American diplomat.
- Maharaja Bijli Pasi, a king from the Pasi community. He ruled during the Muslim period from a site located near Lucknow.
- Balraj Pasi, an Indian politician. He was elected to the Lok Sabha, the lower house of the Parliament of India from the Nainital constituency of Uttar Pradesh.
- Subhash Pasi, a member of Legislative Assembly, Uttar Pradesh
- Suresh Pasi, Indian Politician and a member of 17th Legislative Assembly of Uttar Pradesh of India.
- Madari Pasi, a leader of the militant peasant movement Eka Movement.
- Uda Devi Pasi, claimed to have been a fighter at Sikandar Bagh in the Indian Rebellion of 1857.
- Masuriya Din Pasi (born 2 October 1911) was an Indian politician, a fight against Criminal Tribes Act for independence who served as a member of the Uttar Pradesh
- Riccardo Pasi, Italian footballer.
- Giacomo Pasi, Italian bishop.

== See also ==
- Passi (surname)
