= Uda Devi =

Indian freedom fighter (1830–1857)

Uda Devi Pasi
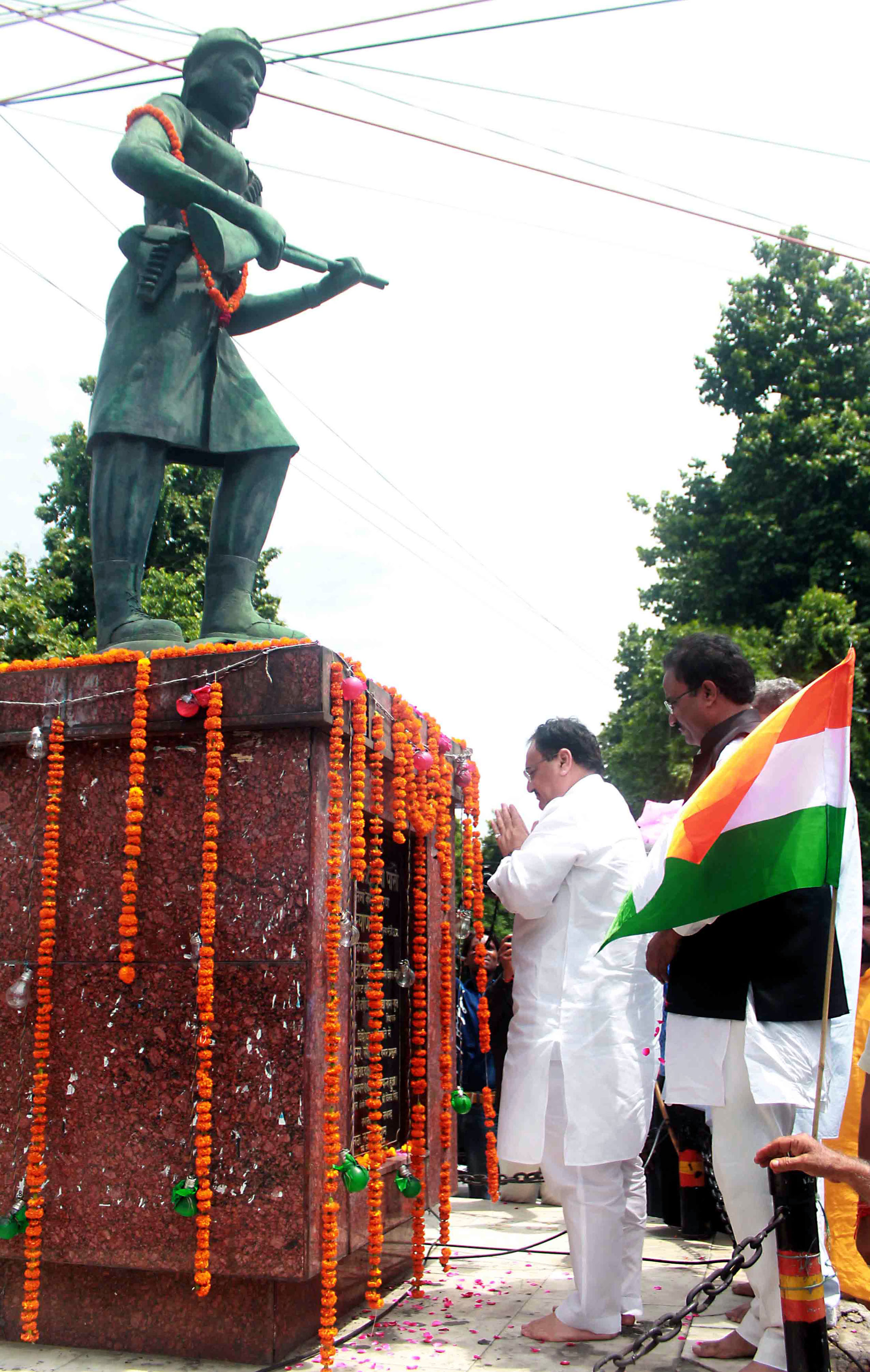
- The Union Minister for Health & Family Welfare, Shri J.P. Nadda paying homage to the freedom fighter Uda Devi, at Sikandar Bagh, Lucknow on August 19, 2016
- Born: 30 June 1830; Gomti Nagar, Lucknow, Uttar Pradesh
- Died: 16 November 1857 (Aged 27); Sikandar Bagh, Lucknow, India
- Known for: Indian Rebellion of 1857

Uda Devi Pasi (1830-1857) was an Indian woman freedom fighter who participated in the war on behalf of Indian soldiers against the British East India Company, during the Indian Rebellion of 1857. She was a member of the women's battalion of Wajid Ali Shah, the last Nawab of Awadh.

While upper caste histories highlight the resistance contributions of upper caste heroines like Jhansi Ki Rani, the reality was also that the battles for independence from British colonial rule also featured Dalit resistance fighters like Uda Devi Pasi. Uda Devi Pasi and other female Dalit participants are today remembered as the warriors or "Dalit Veeranganas" of the 1857 Indian Rebellion. She was married to Makka Pasi who was a soldier in the army of Hazrat Mahal.

On seeing the rising anger of the Indian people with the British administration, Uda Devi reached out to the queen of that district, Begum Hazrat Mahal to enlist for the war. In order to prepare for the battle that was headed their way, the Begum helped her form a women’s battalion under her command. When the Britishers attacked Awadh, both Uda Devi and her husband were part of the armed resistance. When she heard that her husband had died in the battle, she unleashed her final campaign in full force.

== Early life ==
Uda Devi was born on 30 June 1830 in Ujariya village (nowadays known as Gomti Nagar) of Lucknow district of Uttar Pradesh into a Pasi family. Her husband named Makka was a great wrestler of their time.

In the fall of 1857, a general revolt erupted in the cities of Delhi, Jhansi, and Kanpur against the growing hegemony of the British East India Company. In Lucknow, a small British garrison of 2200 clung to life on the banks of the Gomti River surrounded by rebels and lacking adequate supplies. A relief column of British soldiers broke through in September but lacked the firepower to leave again.

== Battle of Sikandar Bagh ==
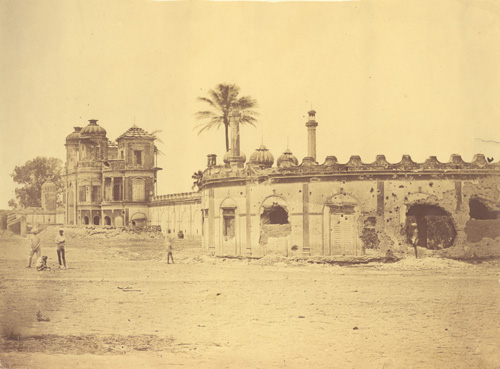
Exterior of the Sikandar Bagh

Uda Devi took part in the Battle of Sikandar Bagh in November 1857. After issuing instructions to her battalion, she climbed up a pipal tree and began shooting at advancing British soldiers. A British officer noted that many of the casualties had bullet wounds indicating steep, downward trajectory. Suspecting a hidden sniper, he ordered his officers to fire at the trees and dislodged a rebel who fell to the ground dead. Upon investigation, the sniper was revealed as Uda Devi Pasi. William Forbes-Mitchell, in Reminiscences of the Great Mutiny, writes of Uda Devi: "She was armed with a pair of heavy old-pattern cavalry pistols, one of which was in her belt still loaded, and her pouch was still about half full of ammunition, while from her perch in the tree, which had been carefully prepared before the attack, she had killed more than half-a-dozen men." The Pasis of Pilibhit, in particular, come together on November 16 every year to commemorate the anniversary of Uda Devi Pasi's martyrdom.

== Battalion named after Uda Devi ==
The Uttar Pradesh government announced on 20 March 2021 the establishment of the Provincial Armed Constabulary (PAC) women's battalion named after Uda Devi, a female Dalit freedom fighter. Three PAC women battalions to be established after three women warriors who sacrificed themselves in India's freedom struggle - Rani Avantibai, Uda Devi and Jhalkaribai, for which all formalities have already been completed," Adityanath said while addressing a gathering at an event organised on the death anniversary of Rani Avantibai Lodhi.

== See also ==
- Banke Chamar
- Chetram Jatav
- Pasi (caste)
- Bijli Pasi
- Madari Pasi
