= Saroj (surname) =

Surname list

Saroj (Sanskrit: सरोज) is a surname used by members of the Pasi community, a Scheduled Caste in India.

== Notable people with the surname ==
- Indrajit Saroj, five times MLA from Manjhanpur, National General Secretary of Samajwadi Party, former Cabinet Minister of Uttar Pradesh
- Pushpendra Saroj, Youngest member of Indian Parliament
- Priya Saroj, youngest female member of Indian Parliament
- Bholanath Saroj is an Indian politician and member of the 17th Lok Sabha from 2019, representing Machhlishahr constituency, Uttar Pradesh.
- Daroga Prasad Saroj (born 1956), Indian politician for the Lalganj (Lok Sabha Constituency) in Uttar Pradesh
- Sarju Prasad Saroj, Indian politician belonging to the Janata Dal
- Sushila Saroj, member of the 15th Lok Sabha of India
- Tufani Saroj (born 1956), Indian politician for the Saidpur (Lok Sabha constituency) in Uttar Pradesh
- Vinod Saroj (Born 1 July 1980) is an Indian politician from Bela Pratapgarh, India
- Kalpana Saroj, female Indian entrepreneur
- Santosh Saroj, Bollywood screenwriter and dialogue writer
- Shiv Kumar Saroj, announcer with the Hindi Service of Radio Ceylon
- Ajay Kumar Saroj (born 1 May 1997) is an Indian middle-distance runner. He won gold medals in the 1500 m event at the 2016 South Asian Games and the 2017 Asian Athletics Championships.

== See also ==
- Pasi (surname)
- Paswan (surname)
- Rawat (surname)
