= Passig =

Passig is a surname. Notable people with the surname include:

- David Passig (born 1957), Israeli futurist
- Kathrin Passig (born 1970), German writer

== See also ==
- Passi (surname)
