= Bauri =

Bauri (Hindi: बाउरी, Bengali: বাউরি) is a surname. Notable people with the surname include:

- Amar Kumar Bauri (born 1978), Indian politician
- Chandana Bauri (born 1990/1991), Indian politician
- Durgadas Bauri (1942–2003), Indian politician
- Kalipada Bauri (died 2019), Indian politician
- Madan Bauri (minister) (1936–2015), Indian politician
- Madan Bauri (MLA), Indian actor
- Sandhya Bauri (born 1951), Indian political and social worker
- Susmita Bauri (born 1975), Indian politician
- Swapan Bauri, Indian politician
- Vivekananda Bauri, Indian politician
