= 2021 Simlipal forest fires =

2021 forest fire in India

The 2021 Simlipal forest fires occurred in the Indian state of Odisha in March and April 2021. The fires have affected the ecologically sensitive Simplipal Biosphere Reserve, and caused widespread damage to the local environment as well as property and livelihoods.

== Background ==
The Simlipal Biosphere Reserve is located in the Indian state of Odisha and encompasses several state and national wildlife parks and sanctuaries, including the Simlipal National Park, the Hadgarh Wildlife Sanctuary and Kuldiha Wildlife Sanctuary, as well as buffer zones of forested areas including the adjoining Nato and Satkoshia Tiger Reserve and forest. The Biosphere was declared as such in 1994 by the Indian Government, and in 2009, UNESCO recognized the Simlipal Biosphere Reserve as part of the World Network of Biosphere Reserves, which are areas designated for balanced relationships between people and nature. Following this, the Regional Plant Resource Centre in Odisha launched a project to identify and catalogue the varieties of flora and fauna in the reserve. The Reserve is home to a vast number of rare and endangered species of flora and fauna, including forests of sal trees, 93 varieties of orchids and 52 species of endangered flora, as well as the Royal Bengal tiger (Panthera tigris tigris), the gaur, or Indian bison, the Asiatic Elephant (Elephas maximus), several varieties of wild cats, including the fishing cat, jungle cat, and leopard cat; the four-horned antelope or chowsingha, and many rare birds, including the red-breasted falconet, grey-headed fishing eagle, slender billed scimitar babbler, white eared bulbul, east-Himalayan long-tailed minivet and common sand piper. Documentation of endemic species within the Biosphere is not yet complete and is ongoing, and in 2019, researchers discovered a tenth species of vine snake, which added to the existing documentation of nine species of vine snakes after a gap of more than 100 years. The Simlipal National Park is an area that has received funds under India's Project Tiger, aimed at tiger conservation, to ensure the maintenance of viable Bengal tiger populations in the reserve.

In addition, the Simlipal Biosphere Reserve is home to several villages and populations of native and aboriginal tribes from India, including the Erenga Kharia people and the Mankidia people, who live in villages within the reserve and practice traditional harvesting activities for subsistence in the reserve, including collecting wild honey, gum, arrowroot, wild mushrooms, tree bark, flowers and seeds. Several communities inside the reserve have been granted community forest rights under Indian law, which grants them protections to "...protect, manage, regenerate or conserve any traditional community forest resource which they have been traditionally protecting and conserving for sustainable use." However, communities have previously reported difficulties in exercising these rights, and in 2017, many were subject to forcible relocations outside the reserve, resulting in damage to traditional lifestyles, cultures, and occupations. In 2018, the Mankidia people, designated a 'particularly vulnerable tribe' by the Odisha government, were denied permission to continue living in their ancestral homes within the biosphere reserve.

Poaching has been an ongoing problem within the reserve and the Odisha state government has attempted to launch a program that attempts to recruit former poachers to act as conservationists, training them to work with the Odisha State Forest Department. In 2018, a fire suspected to have been caused by poachers, damaged large parts of the Simlipal National Park. In addition the construction of highways inside the Simlipal Biosphere Reserve has threatened endemic species and biodiversity. A previous major forest fire occurred in 2015. The state of Odisha has one of the highest rates of forest fire incidents in India. Fires are also a recurrent natural phenomenon in the reserve and are usually brought under control by rainfall that commonly occurs in the region in January and February. The Odisha Forest Department has also stated many fires are caused by humans, either by indigenous tribes engaging in traditional ground-clearing methods, or by poachers who attempt to trap animals fleeing the fires.

To control fires, the Odisha State government is reported to have budgeted ₹50 crore (equivalent to ₹56 crore or US$5.8 million in 2023) and established fire squads equipped with air blowers, fire tenders and safety equipment, and instituted a toll-free number to report fires. However, the reporting network remains inaccessible to most of the indigenous communities that live within the biosphere, making reporting inconsistent.

== Spread and Control ==
In 2021, the Simlipal Biosphere Reserve experienced a prolonged dry spell, exacerbated by a below-average monsoon in the previous year, accompanied by widespread fires within the reserve. The specific cause of the fires that occurred in early 2021 has not been yet established. Local residents stated to The Wire that forest fires are an annual phenomenon in the region but that in 2021, the scale of fire and extent of the spread were unprecedented.

Since early February, officials reported more than 3400 small-scale fires in the biosphere reserve, with 350 of these occurring inside the tiger reserve. Not all these fires were immediately extinguished, and in late February 2021, they began to spread rapidly at the northern and southern ends of the reserve, with wildlife authorities identifying over 300 individual fire points that were burning. On social media, a 'Save Simlipal' campaign started by local environmental activists documented fire damage caused to the reserve.

By 4 March 2021, fires had been burning for over 10 days, and the Odisha state government announced a response, deploying over 1000 persons include fire and forest guards as well as 40 fire tenders and blower machines to control the fire. Simlipal is divided into 21 'ranges' for the purpose of forest patrols and by this time, 8 of these ranges were affected by the fire. Forest department officials stated that very high temperatures exacerbated the situation. Access to fire points in deeply-forested areas also caused challenges in bringing the fires under control. Attempts to control the fire were aided by volunteers from civil society and non-governmental organisations, who used branches and clothes to extinguish small fire points.

On 5 March 2021, Odisha state government officials stated that the fires had been brought under control. However, images accessed from NASA's Fire Information for Resource Management System showed that fires were still spreading in the biosphere reserve. This was confirmed by the Forest Survey of India which had recorded 233 active forest fires in the Simlipal Biosphere Reserve as of 5 March 2021.

On 9 March 2021, a task force constituted by the Odisha State government confirmed that forest fires had spread to 26 out of the state's 30 districts, but that the fires were "almost contained." Several news sources including India Today reported that the fire had been controlled by 9 March 2021, aided in part by rainfall in the region. However, on 14 March 2021, news channel Odisha TV reported that fires were still ongoing in parts of the biosphere reserve.

On 1 April 2021, the Regional Chief Conservator of Forests in Simlipal reported that fires had broken out again in 50 different places inside the Simlipal Biosphere Reserve, chiefly in the Simlipal Tiger Reserve area. Forest officials confirmed that nine persons had been arrested for poaching and intentionally causing fires.

== Impact ==
Odisha's Principal Chief Conservator of Forest and Wildlife stated in March 2021 that the fire did not cause any loss of wildlife and had not affected the core area of the tiger reserves. The statement was reiterated by Odisha Chief Minister Naveen Patnaik who stated in March that the fire had not caused loss of life to people or fauna. This was disputed by a local educational and research institution, the Kalinga Institute of Social Sciences, which stated that the fire had "....endangered flora and fauna, decimating medicinal plants and displacing countless wildlife & adivasi communities..." In addition, local indigenous communities living within the biosphere reserve, as well as environmental activists, described the spread of the fire as unprecedented and causing loss to many native species of flora and fauna. The Wildlife Society of Odisha described the state's claim that no serious damage had occurred as "...ridiculous." pointing particularly to the effect on many native lizard and orchid species. Conservationists have also questioned whether this claim about the impact on fauna can be made before the government undertakes surveys to examine the impact of the fire on local flora and fauna.

The Financial Express has reported that forest fires have destroyed nearly a third of the Simlipal National Park.

Forest officials have expressed concerns that already-high temperatures will be exacerbated by the rise in temperature during the summer months of April and May, which may lead to risks of more fires. After the fire was brought under control, the Odisha state government has constituted a 'Forest Fire Management Task Force to address future forest fire issues. A committee of experts delegated from the Indian federal government has also been sent to the state of Odisha to assist in fire control.

The prolonged fires and higher temperatures are likely to affect the wild honey output in Simlipal, which would have consequences for the local tribal populations that collected and sold wild honey for their livelihood.
