= Passi (disambiguation) =

Passi is a French hip hop artist.

Passi may also refer to:

== People ==
- Passi (surname), surname origin, plus people with the name

== Places ==
- Passi, Iloilo, city in the Philippines
- Passi, Estonia, village in Alatskivi Parish, Tartu County, Estonia

== See also ==
- Pasi (disambiguation)
- Passy (disambiguation)
