= Madari Pasi =

Indian militant peasant movement leader

- Born: Hardoi, Uttar Pradesh, India

Madari Pasi was a leader of the Indian peasant movement Eka Movement.

== History ==
Eka Movement had been an offshoot of Indian National Congress, associated with Non-Cooperation Movement(NCM). But when the Congress was busy in the nationwide Non Cooperation Movement, it somewhat neglected the ongoing Eka Movement. It was this time when Madari Pasi established himself as a charismatic grassroot leader among the kisans involved in the Eka Movement. He united the kisans and petty zamindars from all religions and castes. He pushed the movement in to a violent route. He violently assaulted zamindars, karindas, taluqdars and thikadars and even imprisoned them in their own homes. He began to distribute landowning rights to tenants and petty landholders. His name was associated with dread. Sitapur, Barbanki and Hardoi districts of UP saw aggressive peasant movement called Eka movement, led by Madari Pasi and British Government suppressed the movement within a year but failed to arrest the leader Madari Pasi.

Gandhi with his NCM-Khilafat Movement, after hearing about the violent activities of the Eka Movement members, disassociated himself from the Eka Movement. After losing the support of Congress, it became much easier for the British colonial authorities to suppress it. By 1922 the movement was completely suppressed. After the crackdown by the colonial authorities, the movement went underground. He tried to associate the peasants with Hindustan Socialist Republican Association. Even though there is a confusion, it is generally believed that Madari Pasi died on 27 or 28 March in 1931 while underground.

== See also ==
- Pasi caste
- Bijli Pasi
- Uda Devi
