= Mamoni Bauri =

Indian politician (born 1982)

Member of the West Bengal Legislative Assembly
- Incumbent
- Assumed office 2026
- Preceded by: Pradip Kumar Mazumder
- Constituency: Raghunathpur (SC)

Personal details
- Born: 1982 (age 43–44)
- Party: Bharatiya Janata Party
- Profession: Politician

Mamoni Bauri (born 1982) is an Indian politician from West Bengal. She is a member of the West Bengal Legislative Assembly from Raghunathpur (SC) representing the Bharatiya Janata Party.

== Early life and education ==
Bauri is the daughter of Kalidas Bauri. She is a homemaker, while her spouse works as a daily wage labourer. She studied at Panchgachia Monoharbhal Kamala Girls Higher Secondary School, Kanyapur, Paschim Bardhaman district, and completed Class VI.

== Political career ==
Bauri won the Raghunathpur (SC) seat in the 2026 West Bengal Legislative Assembly election as a candidate of the Bharatiya Janata Party. She received 1,27,628 votes and defeated Hazari Bauri of the All India Trinamool Congress by a margin of 44,059 votes.
