= List of Hindi broadcasters of Radio Ceylon =

Hindi Broadcasters of the Hindi Service of Radio Ceylon.

== D ==
- Sunil Dutt

== S ==
- Shiv Kumar Saroj
- Ameen Sayani
