= Vivekananda Bauri =

Indian politician

Member of the West Bengal Legislative Assembly
- In office 2 May 2021 – 7 May 2026
- Preceded by: Purna Chandra Bauri
- Constituency: Raghunathpur

Personal details
- Party: Bharatiya Janata Party

Vivekananda Bauri is an Indian politician from Bharatiya Janata Party. In May 2021, he was elected as a member of the West Bengal Legislative Assembly from Raghunathpur (constituency). He defeated Bouri Hazari of All India Trinamool Congress by 5,323 votes in 2021 West Bengal Assembly election.
