= Passy (disambiguation) =

Passy is an area in Paris, France.

Passy may also refer to:

== Places ==
- Passy Cemetery in Paris, France
- Passy station, a Paris Metro station
- Communes in France:
  - Passy, Haute-Savoie, in the Haute-Savoie département
  - Passy, Saône-et-Loire, in the Saône-et-Loire département
  - Passy, Yonne, in the Yonne département
  - Passy-en-Valois, in the Aisne département
  - Passy-Grigny, in the Marne département
  - Passy-sur-Marne, in the Aisne département
  - Passy-sur-Seine, in the Seine-et-Marne département
- Passy Peak in Antarctica

== Other uses ==
- Passy (surname)

== See also ==
- PASY, the ICAO code for Eareckson Air Station
- Pasi (disambiguation)
- Passi (disambiguation)
