= Raghunathpur, West Bengal Assembly constituency =

Raghunathpur
- Constituency No. 246 for the West Bengal Legislative Assembly
- Interactive Map Outlining Raghunathpur Assembly Constituency

Constituency details
- Country: India
- Region: East India
- State: West Bengal
- District: Purulia
- Lok Sabha constituency: Bankura
- Established: 1957
- Total electors: 197,720
- Reservation: SC

Member of Legislative Assembly
- 18th West Bengal Legislative Assembly
- Incumbent Mamoni Bauri
- Party: BJP
- Alliance: NDA
- Elected year: 2026

Raghunathpur Assembly constituency is an assembly constituency in Purulia district in the Indian state of West Bengal. It is reserved for scheduled castes.

== Overview ==
As per orders of the Delimitation Commission, No. 246 Raghunathpur Assembly constituency (SC) is composed of the following: Raghunathpur municipality; Raghunathpur I, Neturia and Santuri community development blocks.

Raghunathpur Assembly constituency is part of No. 36 Bankura (Lok Sabha constituency).

== Members of the Legislative Assembly ==
| Year | Name | Party |
From 1952 -1957 known as Kashipur cum Raghunathpur
| 1952 | Budhan Manjhi | Indian National Congress |
| 1952 | Annada Prasad Chakrabarty | Independent politician |
| 1957 | Nepal Bouri | Indian National Congress |
| 1962 | Shankar Narayan Singh Deo | Indian National Congress |
| 1967 | N. Bauri | Indian National Congress |
| 1969 | Haripada Bouri | Socialist Unity Centre of India |
| 1971 | Haripada Bouri | Socialist Unity Centre of India |
| 1972 | Durgadas Bauri | Indian National Congress |
| 1977 | Bijoy Bauri | Socialist Unity Centre of India |
| 1982 | Natabar Bagdi | Communist Party of India |
| 1987 | Natabar Bagdi | Communist Party of India |
| 1991 | Natabar Bagdi | Communist Party of India |
| 1996 | Natabar Bagdi | Communist Party of India |
| 2001 | Uma Rani Bouri | Communist Party of India |
| 2006 | Uma Rani Bouri | Communist Party of India |
| 2011 | Purna Chandra Bauri | All India Trinamool Congress |
| 2016 | Purna Chandra Bauri | All India Trinamool Congress |
| 2021 | Vivekananda Bauri | Bharatiya Janata Party |
| 2026 | Mamoni Bauri | Bharatiya Janata Party |

== Election results ==
=== 2026 ===
2026 West Bengal Legislative Assembly election: Raghunathpur
| Party | Candidate | Votes | % | ±% |
|---|---|---|---|---|
| BJP | Mamoni Bauri | 127,628 | 54.44 | |
| AITC | Hazari Bouri | 83,569 | 35.65 | −6.43 |
| CPI(M) | Ganesh Bouri | 10,685 | 4.56 | |
| INC | Sandhya Bauri | 3,065 | 1.31 | |
| SUCI(C) | Anil Bauri | 2,514 | 1.07 | |
| NOTA | None of the above | 3,201 | 1.37 | −0.29 |
| Majority | | 44,059 | 18.79 | +16.26 |
| Turnout | | 234,431 | 92.13 | +9.38 |
| BJP hold | | Swing | {{{swing}}} | |

=== 2021 ===
West Bengal Legislative Assembly Election, 2021: Raghunathpur
| Party | Candidate | Votes | % | ±% |
|---|---|---|---|---|
| BJP | Vivekananda Bauri | 95,770 | 44.61 | ▲31.69 |
| AITC | Bouri Hazari | 90,332 | 42.08 | |
| CPI(M) | Ganesh Bouri | 14,738 | 6.86 | ▼28.16 |
| SUCI(C) | Pashupati Roy | 3,829 | 1.78 | ▼0.64 |
| Independent | Sumanta Bouri | 2,403 | 1.12 | |
| Independent | Mihir Bauri | 2,354 | 1.1 | |
| NOTA | None of the above | 3,557 | 1.66 | |
| Majority | | 5,438 | 2.53 | |
| Turnout | | 214,690 | 82.75 | |
| BJP gain from AITC | | Swing | | |

=== 2016 ===
2016 West Bengal Legislative Assembly election: Raghunathpur
| Party | Candidate | Votes | % | ±% |
|---|---|---|---|---|
| AITC | Purna Chandra Bauri | 83,688 | 43.39 | |
| CPI(M) | Satyanarayan Bauri | 67,546 | 35.02 | |
| BJP | Subhas Chandra Mondal | 24,912 | 12.92 | |
| SUCI(C) | Kista Bauri | 4,664 | 2.42 | |
| JMM | Gobordhan Bagdi | 3,735 | 1.94 | |
| BSP | Mahadeb Bauri | 3,187 | 1.65 | |
| NOTA | None of the above | 5,152 | 2.67 | |
| Majority | | | | |
| Turnout | | 192,884 | 82.31 | |
| AITC hold | | Swing | | |

=== 2011 ===
West Bengal assembly elections, 2011: Raghunathpur
| Party | Candidate | Votes | % | ±% |
|---|---|---|---|---|
| AITC | Purna Chandra Bauri | 78,096 | 48.34 | +12.61# |
| CPI(M) | Dipali Bauri | 65,353 | 40.46 | −12.56 |
| BJP | Subhas Chandra Mondal | 7,916 | 4.90 | |
| JMM | Barun Bauri | 7,055 | 4.37 | |
| BSP | Mahadeb Bauri | 3,123 | | |
| Turnout | | 161,543 | 81.7 | |
| AITC gain from CPI(M) | | Swing | 25.17# | |

.# Swing calculated on Congress+Trinamool Congress vote percentages taken together in 2006.

=== 2006 ===
In the 2006 and 2001 state assembly elections, Uma Rani Bouri of CPI(M) won the Raghunathpur assembly seat defeating her nearest rivals, Purna Chandra Bouri of Trinamool Congress and Magaram Bouri of Trinamool Congress respectively. Contests in most years were multi cornered but only winners and runners are being mentioned. Natabar Bagdi of CPI(M) defeated Nabakumar Bouri of Congress in 1996, Gopal Das of Congress in 1991 and 1987, and Durgadas Bauri of Congress in 1982. Bijoy Bauri of SUC defeated Nepal Bauri of Janata Party.

=== 1972 ===
Durgadas Bauri of Congress won in 1972. Hari Pada Bouri of SUCI won in 1971 and 1969. N. Bauri of Congress won in 1967. Shankar Narayan Singhadeo of Congress won in 1962. In 1957 Raghunathpur was a joint seat. Shankar Narayan Singhadeo and Nepal Bouri, both of Congress, won in 1957.
