= Muslim Dabgar =

The Muslim Dabgar are a Muslim community found in the state of Uttar Pradesh in India. They are also known as Dalgar and are converts to Islam from the Hindu Dabgar caste.
