= List of Scheduled Tribes in Odisha =

The term "Scheduled Tribes" signifies specific indigenous groups whose status is formally acknowledged to some extent by Indian legislation, often colloquially referred to as "tribals" or "adibasi." In adherence to the Constitution of the Indian Republic, the state of Odisha officially recognizes a total of 64 distinct tribes as Scheduled Tribes. Among these 64 tribes, 13 hold the designation of "Particularly Vulnerable Tribal Groups" (PVTGs).

Tribal face of Odisha
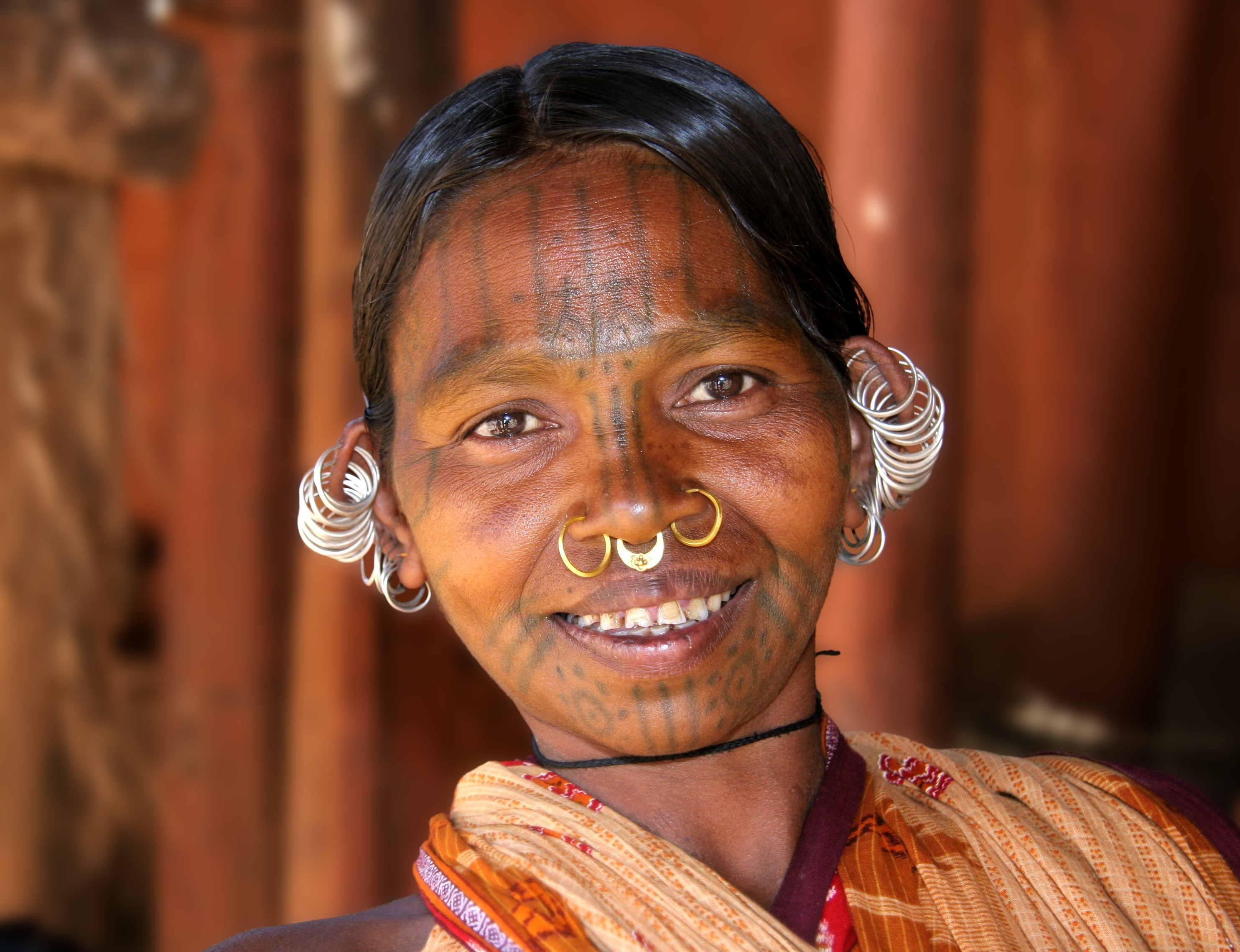
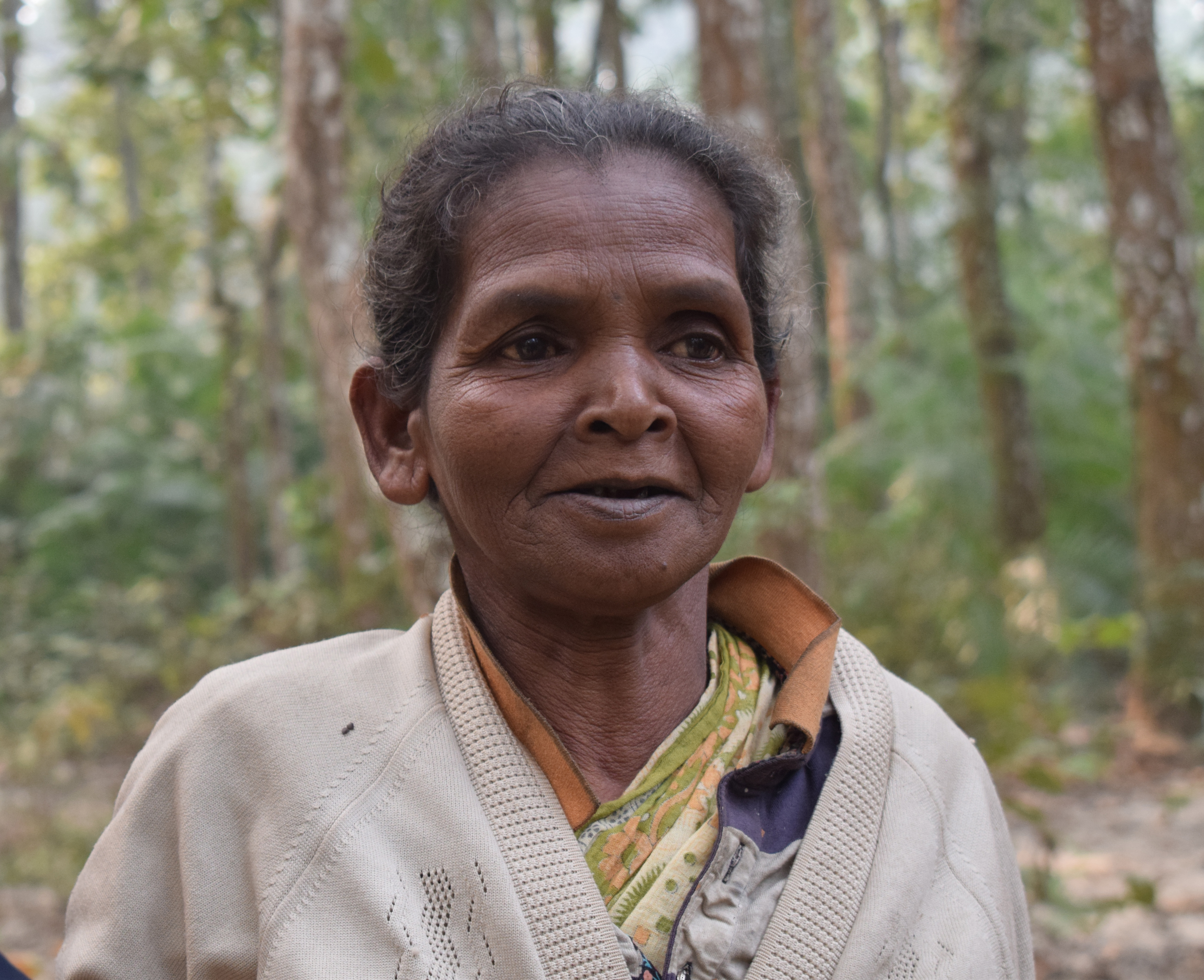
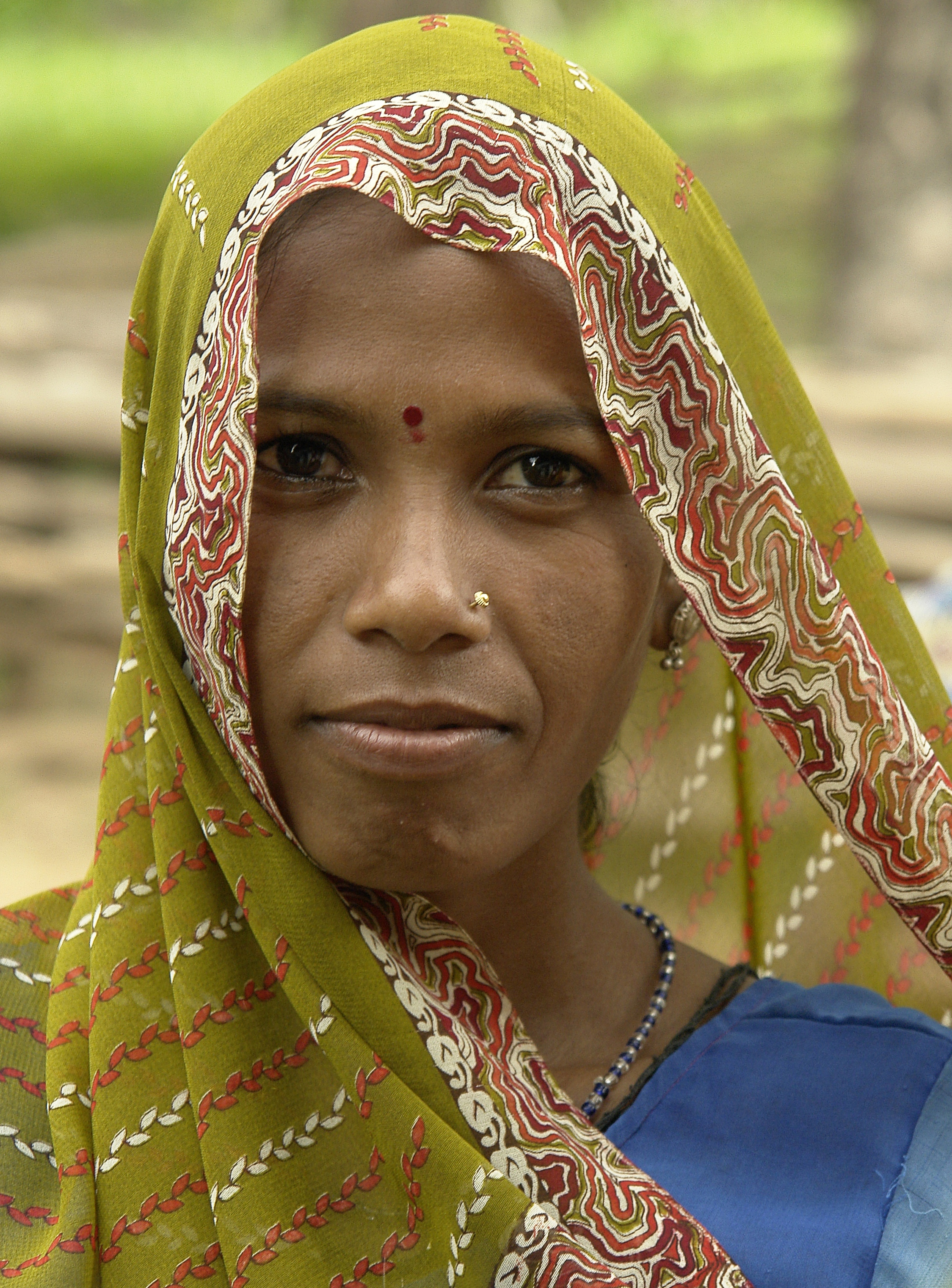
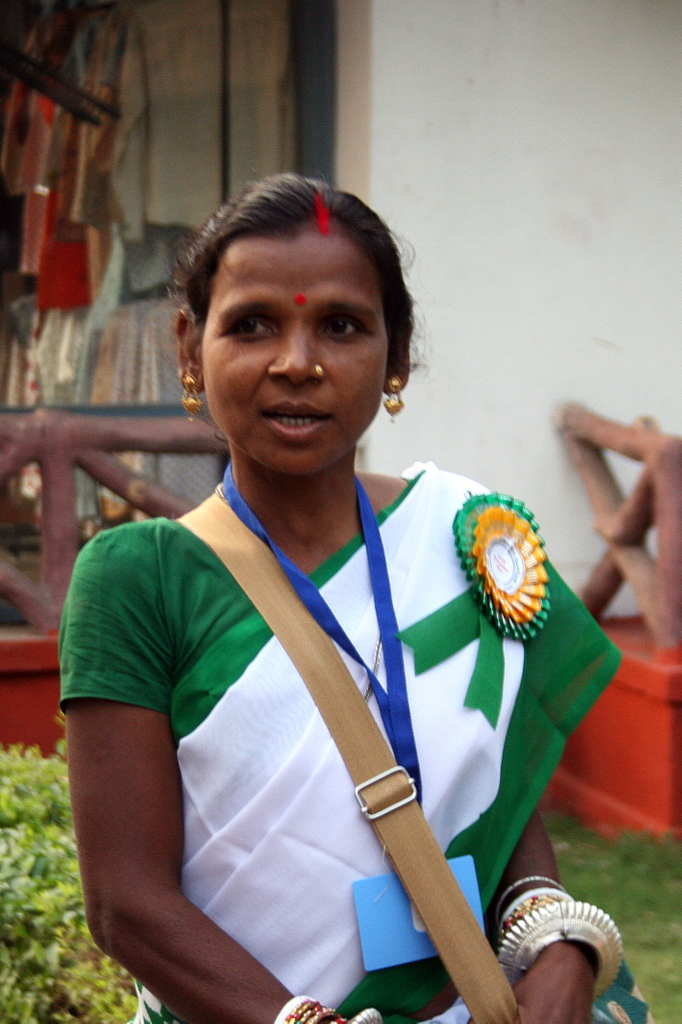
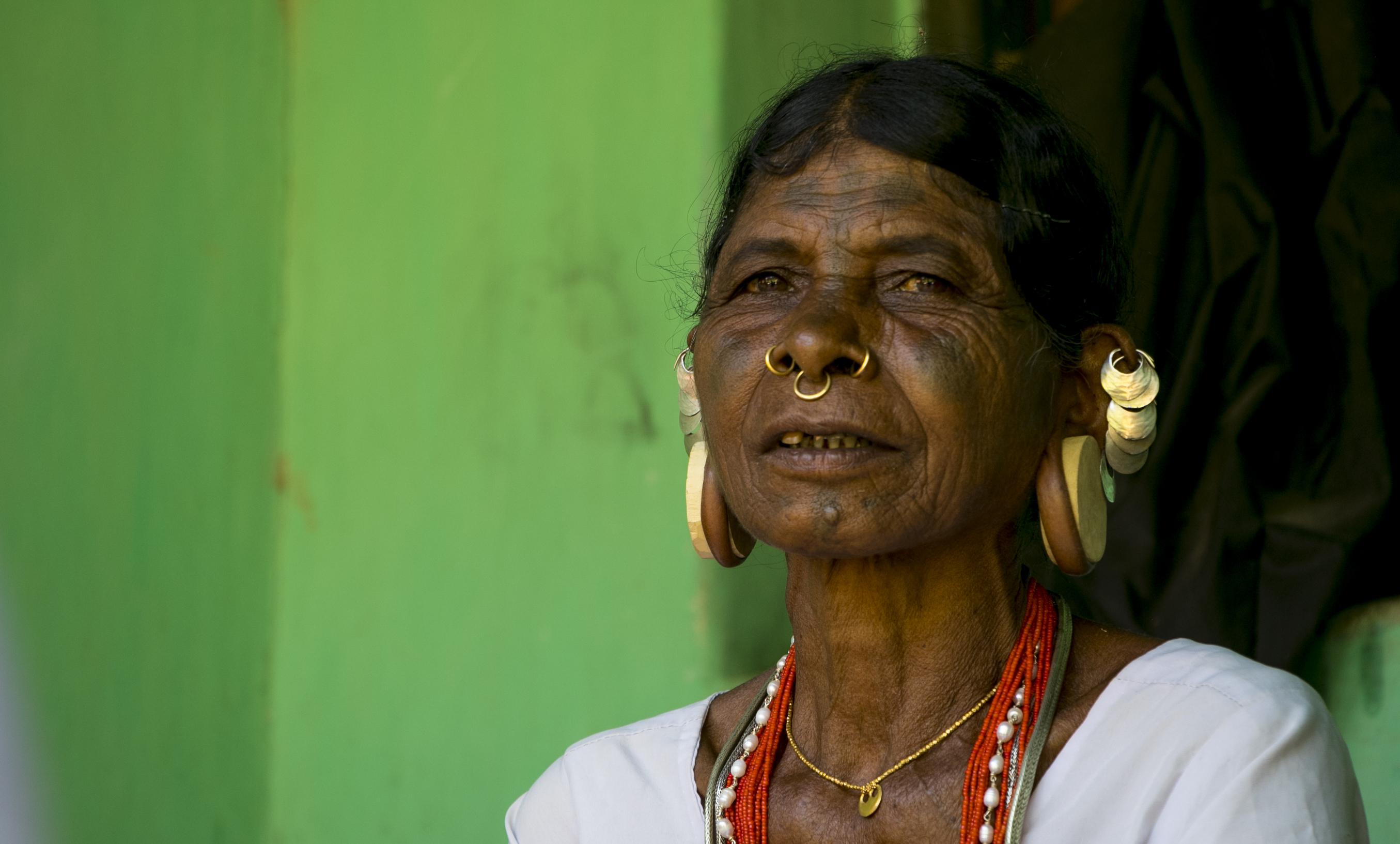
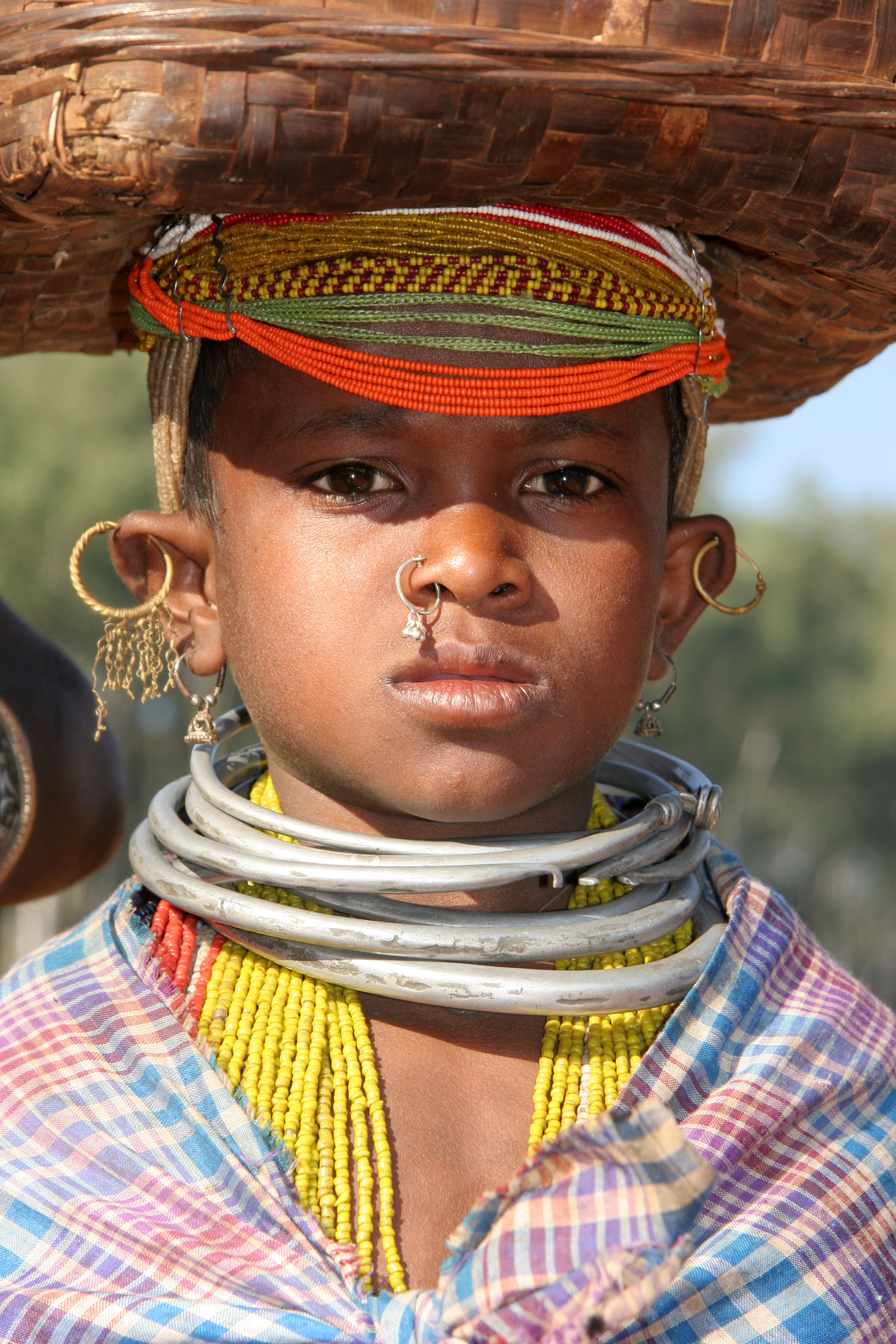
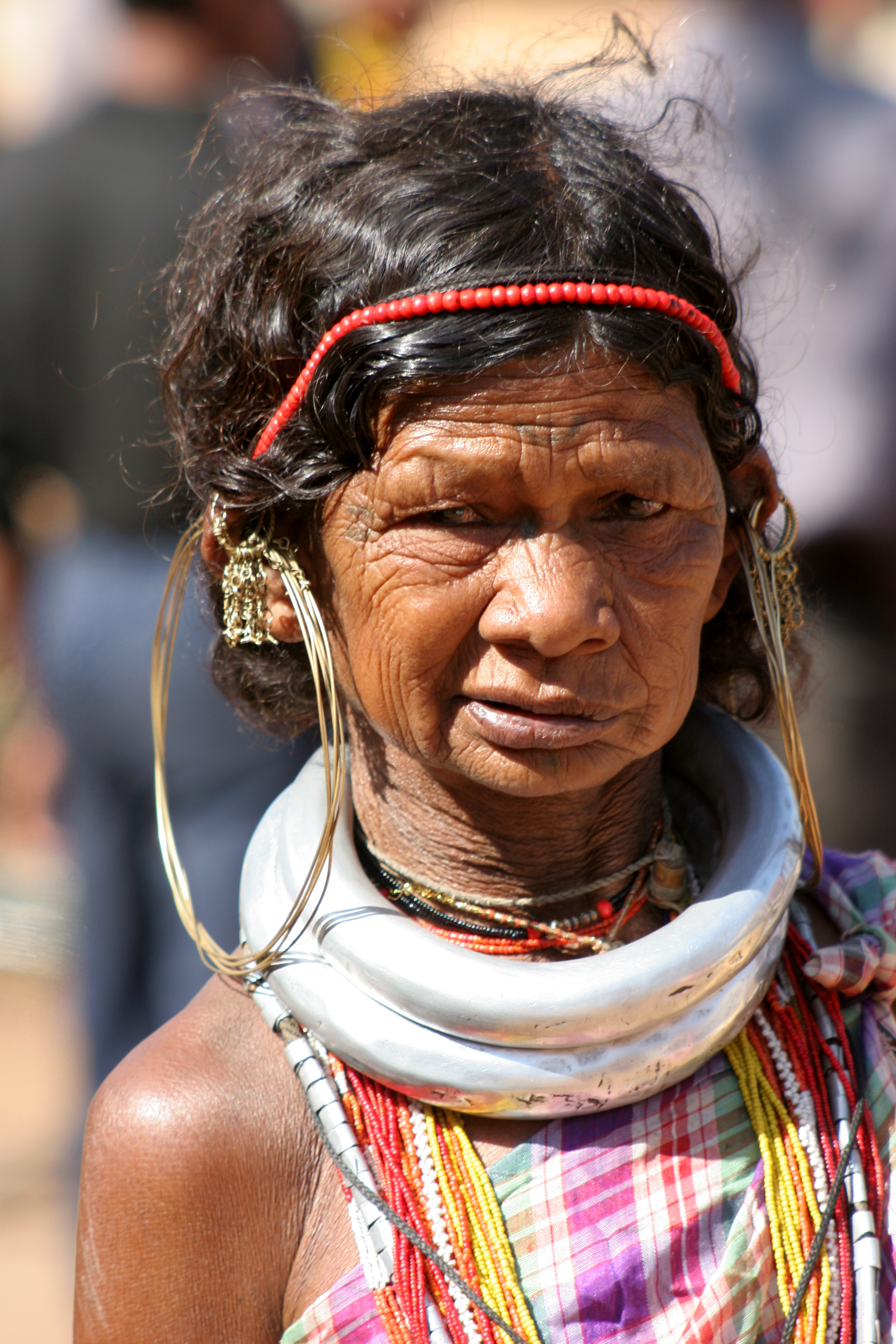
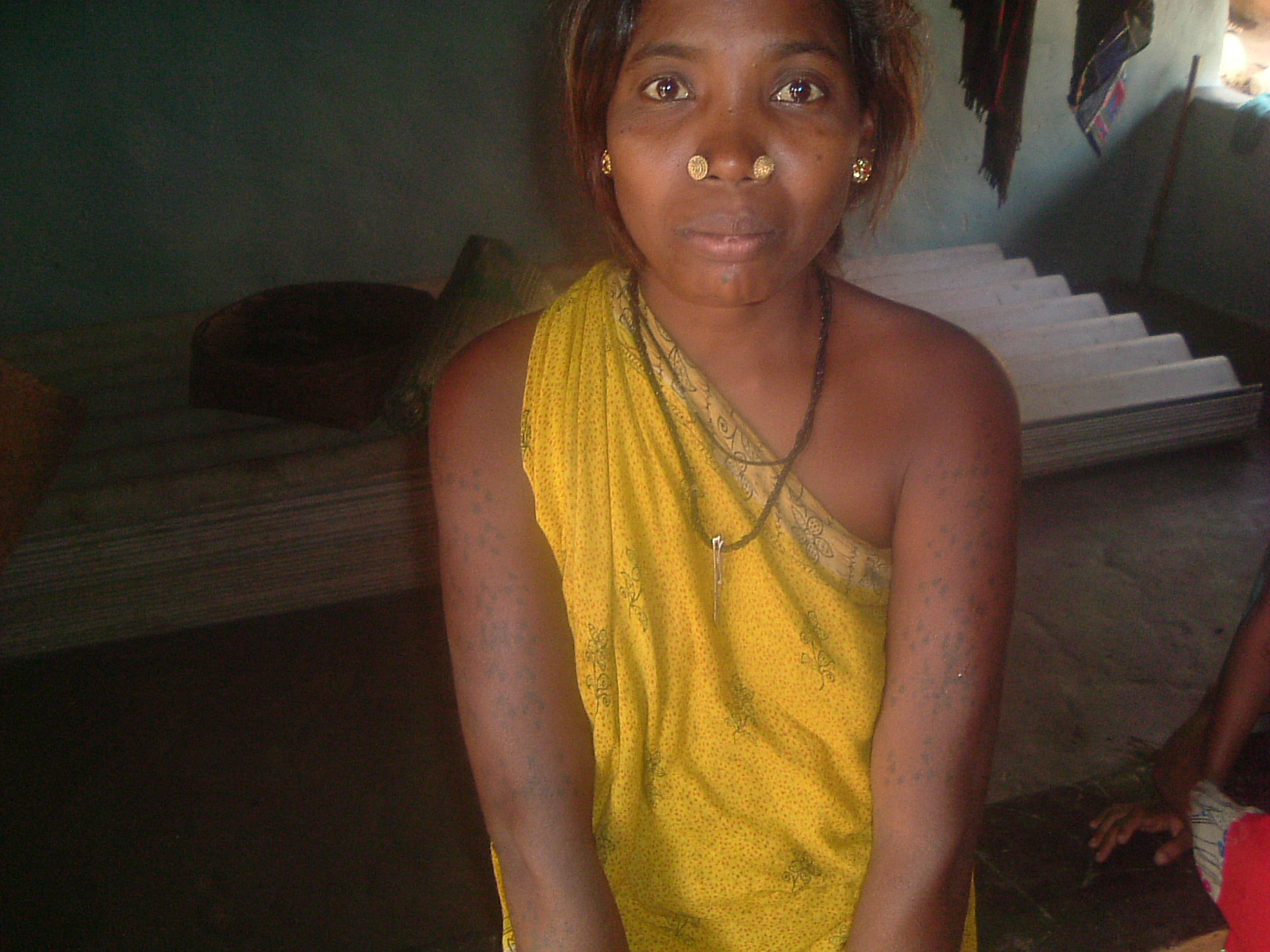

According to the 2011 census, Odisha counted 9,590,756 Scheduled Tribes, ranking as the third-largest state in India in terms of its Scheduled Tribes population, trailing behind Madhya Pradesh and Maharashtra. These tribal communities collectively make up around 22.84% of the state's total population, 9.20% of the nation's Scheduled Tribes population, and about 0.79% of the nation's entire population.

== Main Tribes ==
Distribution of Scheduled Tribes of Odisha, 2011 Census

Percentage of Scheduled Tribes (district wise) of Odisha, 2011 Census

The Kondha or Kandha is the largest tribe of the state in terms of population. They have a population of about one million and are based mainly in the Kandhamal and adjoining districts namely Rayagada, Koraput, Balangir and Boudh. The Santals with a population over 800,000, inhabit the Mayurbhanj district. The Ho people with a population more than 700,000 inhabit in Mayurbhanj, Keonjhar, Jajpur, Balasore, Bhadrak, Sambalpur, Jharsuguda, Sonepur, Deogarh, Dhenkanal, Anugul, Jharsuguda, Sundergarh, Kandhamal district. The Saura, with a population over 300,000, are found mainly in the Gajapati, Ganjam and Puri districts. The Bonda, are known as 'the Naked People', and have a population of about 5,000 and live in Malkangiri district formerly part of undivided Koraput. The Kisans are the main residents of Sundergarh, Sambalpur and Keonjhar.

== List of scheduled tribes ==
In accordance with The Scheduled Castes and Scheduled Tribes Orders (Amendment) Act, 1976.

1. Bagata, Bhakta
2. Baiga
3. Banjara, Banjari
4. Bathudi, Bhaturi
5. Bhottada, Dhotada, Bhotra, Bhatra, Bhattara, Bhotora
6. Bhuiya, Bhuyan
7. Bhumia
8. Bhumij, Teli Bhumij, Haldipokhria Bhumij, Haladi Pokhria Bumij, Desia Bhumij, Tamaria Bhumij
9. Bhunjia
10. Binjhal, Binjhwar
11. Binjhia, Binjhoa
12. Birhor
13. Bondo Poraja, Bonda Poraja, Banda Paroja
14. Chenchu
15. Dal
16. Desua Bhumij
17. Dharua
18. Didayi
19. Gadaba, Bodo Gadaba, Gutob Gadaba, Ollaro Gadaba, Parenga Gadaba, Sano Gadaba
20. Gandia
21. Ghara
22. Gond, Gondo
23. Ho
24. Holva
25. Jatapu
26. Juang
27. Kandha Gauda
28. Kawar
29. Kharia, Kharian, Berga Kharia, Dhelki Kharia, Dudh Kharia, Erenga Kharia, Munda Kharia, Oraon Kharia, Pahadi Kharia
30. Kharwar
31. Khond, Kond, Kandha, Nanguli Kandha, Sitha Kandha, Buda Khond, Bara Khanda, Desia Khanda, Kandha Gauda, Malua Khond, Raja Khond
32. Kisan, Nagesar, Nagesia
33. Kol
34. Kolah Loharas, Kol Loharas
35. Kolha
36. Koli, Malhar
37. Kondadora
38. Kora, Khaira, Khayara
39. Korua
40. Kotia
41. Koya, Gumba Koya, Koitur Koya, Kamara Koya, Musar Koya
42. Kulis
43. Lodha, Nodh, Nodha, Lodh
44. Madia
45. Mahali
46. Mankidi
47. Mankirdia, Mankria, Mankirdi
48. Matya, Matia
49. Mirdhas, Kuda, Koda
50. Munda, Munda Lohara, Munda Mahalis, Nagabanshi Munda, Odiya Munda
51. Mundari
52. Omanatya
53. Oraon, Dhangar, Uran
54. Parenga
55. Paroja, Parja, Bodo Paroja, Barong Jhodia Paroja, Chhelia Paroja, Jhodia Paroja, Konda Paroja, Ponga Paroja, Sodia Paroja, Solia Paroja
56. Pentia
57. Rajuar
58. Santal
59. Saora, Arsi Saora, Based Saora, Bhima Saora, Chumura Saora, Jati Saora, Jauri Saora, Kampu Saora, Kadu Saora, Kimpal Saora, Kumbi Kancher Saora, Kalapithia Saora, Kirat Saora, Lanjia Saora, Lamba Saora, Laria Saora, Maria Saora, Uriya Saora, Raika Saora, Sudda Saora, Tankala Saora, Patro Saora, Savar, Saura, Sahara
60. Shabar, Lodha
61. Sounti
62. Tharua
63. Mukha Dora, Nuka Dora, Muk Dora (in the undivided district of Karaput, which includes Koraput, Nabarangpur, Rayagada and Malkangiri district)
64. Konda Reddy, Konda Reddi

=== List of Particularly Vulnerable Tribal Groups ===
1. Birhor
2. Bondo
3. Chukutia Bhunjia
4. Didayi
5. Dangria Khond
6. Juangas
7. Kharias
8. Kutia Kondh
9. Lanjia Sauras
10. Lodhas
11. Mankidias
12. Paudi Bhuyans
13. Soura

== Demographics ==
Sl no	Scheduled Tribe	Population (2011)	Literacy rate
1	Bagata	8,813	53.89
2	Baiga	338	67.25
3	Banjara	18,257	62.28
4	Bathudi	2,17,395	63.71
5	Bhottada	4,50,771	40.03
6	Bhuiya	3,06,129	63.14
7	Bhumia	1,25,977	41.94
8	Bhumij	2,83,909	52.06
9	Bhunjia	12,350	44.93
10	Binjhal	1,37,040	57.16
11	Binjhia	11,419	57.86
12	Birhor	596	47.24
13	Bondo	12,231	36.51
14	Chenchu	13	54.55
15	Dal	25,598	43.20
16	Desua Bhumij	404	56.98
17	Dharua	18,151	31.39
18	Didayi	8,890	34.56
19	Gadaba	84,689	39.30
20	Gandia	1854	35.81
21	Ghara	195	71.43
22	Gond	8,88,581	59.65
23	Ho	8,06,008	54.79
24	Holva	28,149	48.90
25	Jatapu	14,890	47.22
26	Juang	47,095	42.85
27	Kandha Gauda	26,403	56.49
28	Kawar	5225	64.44
29	Kharia	2,22,844	58.46
30	Kharwar	2,265	62.49
31	Khond	16,27,486	46.95
32	Kisan	3,31,589	64.21
33	Kol	4,058	46.26
34	Kolah Loharas	9,558	52.68
35	Kolha	6,25,009	42.23
36	Koli	6,423	57.57
37	Kondadora	20,802	48.27
38	Kora	54,408	68.54
39	Korua	499	32.60
40	Kotia	7,232	44.36
41	Koya	1,47,137	29.87
42	Kulis	13,689	78.88
43	Lodha	9,785	43.08
44	Madia	2,243	48.36
45	Mahali	18,625	51.24
46	Mankidi	31	35.71
47	Mankirdia	2,222	21.14
48	Matya	30,169	51.05
49	Mirdhas	75,940	62.31
50	Munda	5,58,691	54.92
51	Mundari	25,655	59.89
52	Omanatya	28,736	36.27
53	Oraon	3,58,112	67.57
54	Parenga	9,445	32.78
55	Paroja	3,74,628	34.92
56	Pentia	10,003	44.93
57	Rajuar	3,518	51.97
58	Santal	8,94,764	55.57
59	Saora	5,34,751	54.99
60	Shabar	5,16,402	53.29
61	Sounti	1,12,803	59.58
62	Tharua	9,451	50.44

(Note : PVTGs of Odisha are bold texted)

=== District wise distribution ===
Districts		Scheduled Tribes		
Districts	Population (2011)	Population	Percent	Top 3 largest (by pop)
Anugola	1,273,821	179,603	14.10	Gond (29,276); Khond (26,227); Mirdhas (20,519)
Balangir	1,648,997	347,164	21.05	Gond (108,128); Khond (92,452); Saora (50,401)
Baleshwar	2,320,529	275,678	11.88	Santal (104,996); Bhumij (70,014); Kolha (49,334)
Baragada	1,481,255	281,135	19.82	Saora (106,465); Binjhal (80,168); Gond (32,457)
Bhadrak	1,506,337	30,428	2.02	Kolha (7,681); Munda (7,234); Shabar (4,892)
Boudh	441,162	55,364	12.55	Khond (40,746); Gond (4,915); Saora (2,595)
Debagada	312,520	110,400	35.32	Kisan (26,851); Munda (21,964); Gond (15,606)
Dhenkanal	1,192,811	162,056	13.59	Shabar (44,387); Munda (22,643); Juang (17,884)
Gajapati	577,817	313,714	54.29	Saora (148,927); Shabar (112,648); Khond (44,306)
Ganjam	3,529,031	118,928	3.37	Khond (50,050); Shabar (33,002); Saora (22,565)
Jagatsinghapur	1,136,971	7,862	0.69	Santal (2,489); Kolha (1,228); Munda (1,047)
Jajpur	1,827,192	151,432	8.29	Munda (49,874); Shabar (44,899); Kolha (15,886)
Jharsuguda	579,505	176,758	30.50	Kisan (53,113); Gond (45,984); Munda (20,063)
Kalahandi	1,576,869	449,456	28.50	Khond (212,915); Gond (94,465); Shabar (48,107)
Kandhamala	733,110	392,820	53.58	Khond (366,784); Gond (11,657); Kandha Gauda (4,507)
Kataka	2,624,470	93,745	3.57	Shabar (38,003); Munda (19,938); Khond (9,020)
Kendrapada	1,440,361	9,484	0.66	Santal (2,666); Shabar (2,278); Munda (1,137)
Kendujhar	1,801,733	818,878	45.45	Kolha (251,994); Bhuiya (104,049); Gond (80,693)
Khordha	2,251,673	115,051	5.11	Shabar (45,577); Khond (12,643); Santal (12,581)
Koraput	1,379,647	697,583	50.56	Paroja (221,828); Khond (195,154); Gadaba (68,677)
Malkangiri	613,192	354,614	57.83	Koya (145,652); Bhumia (71,152); Khond (21,824)
Mayurbhanj	2,519,738	1,479,576	58.72	Santal (638,104); Kolha (261,578); Bhumij (173,060)
Nabarangpur	1,220,946	681,173	55.79	Bhottada (325,425); Gond (167,052); Paroja (74,243)
Nayagada	962,789	58,691	6.09	Khond (41,266); Shabar (7,006); Kond (4,779)
Nuapada	610,382	206,327	33.80	Gond (133,859); Shabar (28,814); Bhunjia (8,951)
Puri	1,698,730	6,129	0.36	Shabar (2,054); Santal (780); Matya (582)
Rayagada	967,911	541,905	55.99	Khond (385,437); Saora (79,181); Shabar (28,047)
Sambalpur	1,041,099	355,261	34.12	Kisan (90,832); Oraon (64,862); Gond (53,324)
Subarnapur	610,183	57,192	9.37	Saora (16,202); Gond (10,535); Khond (8,213)
Sundaragada	2,093,437	1,062,349	50.75	Oraon (289,334); Munda (232,739); Kisan (147,268)
Total	41,974,218	9,590,756	22.85	Kondh ();

=== Language ===
Languages of Scheduled Tribes of Odisha, 2011 census
1. Odia (45.0%)
2. Kui/Kondh (Note: 9.06% Kui and 1.11% Khond/Kondh) (10.2%)
3. Santali (8.81%)
4. Sambalpuri (5.63%)
5. Munda/Mundari (Note: 3.37% Munda and 1.27% Mundari) (4.64%)
6. Ho (4.23%)
7. Sabar (3.07%)
8. Sadri (2.56%)
9. Kisan (2.01%)
10. Paroja (1.54%)
11. Koya (1.48%)
12. Kurukh (1.37%)
13. Desia (1.35%)
14. Kharia (1.27%)
15. Other (6.89%)

According to the 2011 Census of India, Odisha's Scheduled Tribes constitute 22.84% (9,590,756) of the state's total population. Among them, Odia is spoken by 44.98% of the population, Kui by 10.17% (including 106,101 Khond speakers), and Santali by 8.81%. Sambalpuri is spoken by 5.63%, Munda by 4.64% (including 121,391 Mundari speakers), and Ho by 4.23%. Additionally, Savara is spoken by 3.07%, Sadan/Sadri by 2.56%, and Kisan by 2.01%. Proja is spoken by 1.54%, Koya by 1.48%, and Kurukh/Oraon by 1.37%. Desia is spoken by 1.35%, and Kharia by 1.26% of the population. Furthermore, Bhatri is spoken by 81,413 individuals, Telugu by 50,375, and Gondi by 45,042. Laria is spoken by 40,893, Bhumijali by 34,131, Chhattisgarhi by 33,342, and Gadaba by 32,534 individuals. Juang is spoken by 30,217, Bhuiya/Bhuyan by 28,275, and Halabi by 19,722. Hindi is spoken by 17,924, Bengali by 9,080, and Kuvi by 6,374. Banjari is spoken by 5,218, Ladakhi by 3,020, Urdu by 2,658, Koda/Kora by 1,995, Rai by 1,788, and Coorgi/Kodagu by 1,305 individuals.

== Inclusion in and exclusion from Scheduled list ==
Initially, the list of Scheduled Tribes in Odisha consisted of 42 tribes. The implementation of the Scheduled Tribes Modification Order in 1956 brought significant changes, including the inclusion of 21 new tribes as Scheduled Tribes, such as Bhottada, Bhumia, Bhumij, Bhunjia, Desua Bhumij, Dharua, Didayi, Gandia, Holva, Kandha Gauda, Kol, Kotia, Lodha, Madia, Matya, Omanatya, Parenga, Pentia, Rajuar, Sabar Lodha, and Sounti. Additionally, the tribe named Gorait was excluded from the list and enlisted in Scheduled Castes. However, after the establishment of the Tribal Research Institute, it was discovered that six communities viz. Chenchu, Ghara, Kandha Gauda, Kuli, Saunti had been mistakenly included in the list due to a lack of accurate local information when the list was originally drawn up in 1950 and revised in 1956. As they did not meet the basic criteria for tribal status, the Odisha government later proposed their exclusion from the list. However, this proposal faced opposition from members in Parliament, and as a result, there were no changes made to the list of Scheduled Tribes in Odisha. In the same way, 169 communities are proposed by the state government for inclusion in the Scheduled Tribes list since 1970. These are mostly synonyms, segments and phonetic variations of existing Scheduled Tribes, such as Kandha Kumbhar, Jodia, Chuktia Bhunjia, Saara, Mankidia, Porja, Banda Paraja, Durua, and Paharia. As of 2023, the central government has rejected 81 communities, returning them to the state government due to a lack of supporting documents. In 2024, two more Dravidian tribal communities, namely Muka Dora (with area restrictions) and Konda Reddy, were scheduled to the Tribal list of Odisha.
