= Pasi (given name) =

- Gender: Masculine
- Language: Finnish

Origin
- Origin: Greek: Βασίλειος
- Meaning: King (in ancient Greek)

Other names
- Anglicisation: Basil

Pasi is a Finnish masculine given name. Notable people with this name include:

- Pasi Arvonen (born 1968), Finnish ice hockey coach
- Pasi Hirvonen (born 1988), Finnish ice hockey defenceman
- Pasi Jaakonsaari (born 1959), Finnish footballer
- Pasi Lind (born 1961), Finnish judoka
- Pasi Siitonen (born 1978), Finnish singer, better known as Stig
- Pasi Välimäki (born 1965), Finnish general
