= Ujariyaon =

Ujariyaon Ujariaon
- Mohalla
- Location in Uttar Pradesh, India Ujariyaon (India)
- Coordinates: 26°52′N 81°0′E
- Country: India
- State: Uttar Pradesh
- District: Lucknow

Languages
  - Official: Hindi
- Time zone: UTC+5:30 (IST)

Ujariyaon, also spelled Ujariaon, is a neighbourhood (mohalla) in Lucknow, in the Rajiv Gandhi 1st ward. Once a separate village located 2 miles east of the city of Lucknow, Ujariyaon is located on the east bank of the Gomti River, between the smaller tributary streams the Kukrail and the Sahiri.

Ujariyaon is surrounded by Lohiya Park, Ambedkar Park, St. Joseph Hospital, Manoj Pandey Chauraha, Mithai wala Chauraha, electricity office. Gomti Nagar was developed on the land of Ujariyaon Zamindars; the government initially started this housing project as "Ujariyaon Awasiya Yojna"; the name was later changed to "Gomti Nagar awasiye yogna". Ujariyaon has one of the largest graveyards in Lucknow, called the Ganj Shaheeda, which has around 52 bighas of land and is registered as a Waqf property with the Uttar Pradesh Sunni Central Waqf Board. Ganj Shaheeda also has a mosque at its centre called Masjid Ganj Shaheeda. Ujariyaon also has around 12 personal graveyards belonging to different Zamindar families.

== Name and history ==
Ujariyaon is said to have been the site of an earlier Bhar village, which was conquered by a Muslim army led by two brothers named Abdullah and "the Turkoman", who were subjects of the Delhi Sultanate. The Bhar raja and the brother known as the Turkoman were both killed in the battle. The victorious Abdullah married the slain raja's daughter and settled down in the village, which he named Shahpur, but just a few days later he and his followers were massacred by the former king's brother while praying during the Id festival. The only survivor was a woman named Ujali, who was living at her father's house in Bado Sarai (now in Barabanki district). Her son Ghias-ud-Din was then an infant; when he grew up, he went into service in the imperial army and led a campaign against Shahpur (which conveniently happened to fall on the day of Holi). He was successful, the (current) raja was killed, and Ghias-ud-Din had the village razed to the ground. He then re-founded it as Ujaliaon in honour of his mother Ujali, who had survived the previous massacre.

At the turn of the 20th century, the village of Ujariyaon lay 2 miles to the east of Lucknow. It was on the high ground overlooking the khadir land regularly inundated by the Gomti during floods, and during heavy rains was only accessible from the north. The upland area on which it lay was "a stretch of sandy, unproductive soil", broken up by ravines, that supposedly marks a former bank of the Gomti. Irrigation was provided by earthen wells as well as a tank to the north. Both the broad- and narrow-gauge railways to Bara Banki crossed the village lands. Ujariyaon's zamindars were Sheikhs who claimed descent from the village's founder, although at the time they were not very prosperous and had mortgaged the village to Nawab Jafar Ali Khan of Bijnaur. The village had one school and, as of the 1901 census, had a population of 2,933, including a Muslim population of 694. Most of the Hindu residents belonged to the Ahir community.The family of Nawab Mehdi Hasan Sahib also lives in Ujariyaon, who had two sons Javvad Hussain and Nawab Hussain
