= Shiv Kumar Saroj =

Indian radio personality

Shiv Kumar Saroj was a popular announcer with the Hindi Service of Radio Ceylon, the oldest radio station in South Asia.

He was born on Oct 6 in a small town in the United Provinces of British India.

Saroj helped establish the radio station as the leader of the airwaves right across the Indian sub-continent. Millions of listeners in India tuned in to hear Saroj on Radio Ceylon.

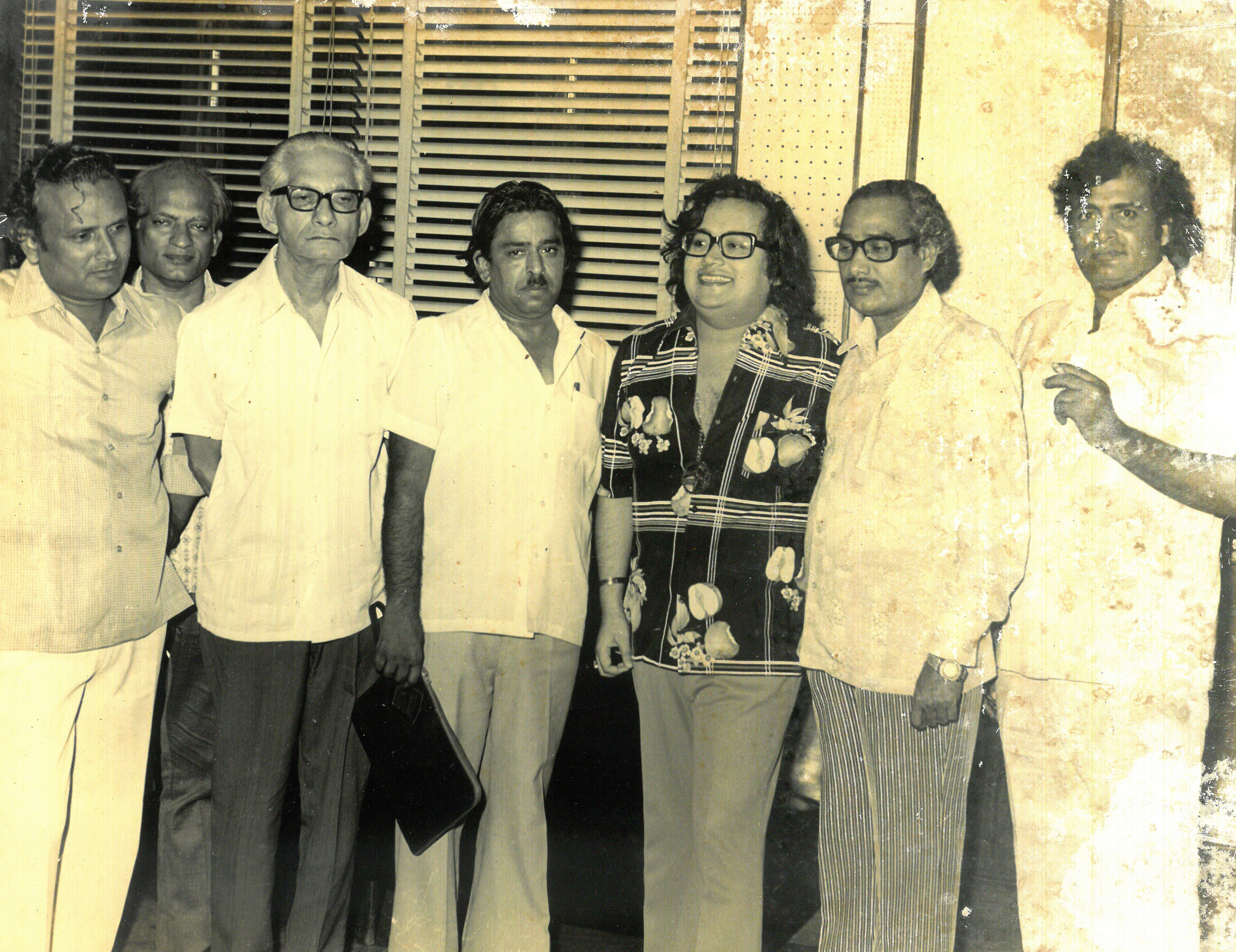
An old picture of Mr. Shiv Kumar Saroj (Second from the right) with Mr. Bappi Lahiri at studio

Shiv Kumar Saroj was also a noted lyricist who penned several songs that featured in Bollywood films and music albums.

List of songs written by Shiv Kumar Saroj

1. Khamosh Zindagi Ko Aawaaz De Rahe Ho (1966) 2. Tere Labon Ke Muqabil, Gulab Kya Hoga 3. Pyaar Manga Hain Tumhi Se (1978) 4. College Girl, I Love You Mujhse Nazar Mila O Dilruba (1978) 5. Kaisi Shaam Suhani Aai re (1972) 6. Ja Re Ja Meri Chodd Chunariya (1962) 7. Suna Hain Jeewan Mera Charo Taraf Andhera (1977) 8. Chinn Liya Re Baiman Mera Dill (1962) 9. Mujhase Yun Ruth Kar Kyun Dur Jaa Rahi Ho

== See also ==
- Radio Ceylon
- List of Hindi broadcasters of Radio Ceylon
