= Eka Movement =

Indian peasant movement started in 1921

Eka Movement or Unity Movement is a peasant movement which surfaced in Hardoi, Bahraich, Barabanki and Sitapur of North Western Province of U.P during the end of 1921. Initially started by Congress and the Khilafat movement, it was later headed by Madari Pasi. The main reason for the movement was high rent, which was generally higher than 50% of recorded rent in some areas. Oppression by thekedars who were entrusted to collect rent and practice of share rent also contributed to this movement.

The Eka meetings were marked by a religious ritual in which a hole that represented River Ganga was dug in the ground and filled with water, a priest was brought in to preside and assembled peasants vowed that they would pay only recorded rent but pay it on time, would not leave when ejected, would refuse to do forced labour, would give no help to criminals and abide by the Panchayat decisions, they would not pay the revenue without receipt and would remain united under any circumstance. Small zamindars who were disenchanted with British Government due to heavy land revenue demand were also a part of this movement.

Soon the leadership of Movement changed from Congress to Madari Pasi, a low caste leader who was not inclined to accept non-violence. This led the movement losing contact with nationalist class. Because in this the national leader was Mahatma Gandhi and his ideology was based on non violence. The loss of supporters and backing of Congress due to the violent turn of the movement made it easier for colonial authorities to repress the movement.

In March 1922, arresting of the leader Madari Pasi by the British government brought the Eka Movement to an end.
