= Turuk Pasi =

Muslim community

Regions with significant populations
- India

Languages
- • Hindi • Urdu • Bhojpuri

Religion
- Islam

Related ethnic groups
- • Pasi

The Turuk Pasi are a Muslim community found in the state of Bihar in India.
