= Mankidia =

Total population
- 2,222 (2011)

Regions with significant populations
- Odisha: 2,222

Languages
- Odia, Munda

Religion
- Autonomous Tribal Religion

The Mankidia (also known as Mankadia, Mankidi, Mankirdia) are a nomadic ethnic group of India that live in Odisha. Mankidias mostly live in the Mayurbhanj, Sambalpur, Kalahandi and Sundergarh districts. According to the 2011 census, the population of Mankidia was 2,222. They are classified as a Scheduled Tribe by the Indian government.

== Origins ==
The Mankidia are an ethnic offshoot of the Birhor tribe. They specialize in catching monkeys (called mankada in Odia), hence their name was derived from the name that neighboring tribes called them. People believe that their origin is from Chota Nagpur Plateau. They might have migrated to different parts of Odisha and finally settled in the hilly areas.

== Culture ==
The Mankidia are a semi-nomadic hunter/gatherer community. Traditionally skilled in rope making, catching, and hunting of monkeys, they are often employed by local people to drive away invasive monkeys in rural areas. They move around forests in small bands and stay at different temporary makeshift settlements called tanda/tandia. The tandia comprises a temporary dome-shaped leaf hut known as Kumbhas. They speak a form of Mundari language, and some can also speak Odia. Each Tandia is headed by a religious head man called Dehuri. The Dehuri has an assistant called Naya.

The Mankidia people's religious beliefs are polytheistic. They believe in many malevolent and benevolent spirits and gods. Their supreme deities are Logobir and Budhimai. They also worship their ancestors for good health and success in hunting and harvesting forest produce.

Besides hunting they also engage in making baskets and ropes out of Siali fiber, Sabai grass and Jute, as well as making disposable plates made out of leaves called Khali.

== See also ==
- Tribes of India
- List of Scheduled Tribes in Odisha
