= Durgadas Bauri =

Indian politician

Durgadas Bauri was an Indian politician, belonging to the Indian National Congress. He was born on January 15, 1942, in Raghunathpur. He was the son of Yugal Chandra Bauri. He went to school at Godi Bero High School.

Mahata contested the Raghunathpur constituency seat in the 1971 West Bengal Legislative Assembly election, finishing in second place with 8,282 votes (28.36)%). The following year he won the Raghunathpur seat in the 1972 West Bengal Legislative Assembly election, obtaining 13,846 votes (50.66%). Bauri lost the Raghunathpur seat in the 1977 West Bengal Legislative Assembly election, finishing in fourth place with 6,159 votes (18.51%). In the 1982 West Bengal Legislative Assembly election he finished in second place in Raghunathpur, obtaining 18,935 votes (31.64%).

Bauri died in 2003.
