= Kureel =

Indian caste

Kuril, Kureel
Regions with significant populations
- India

Languages
- Hindi, Awadhi, Kannauji, Telugu, Marathi

Religion
- Hinduism, Ravidassia, Christianity, Buddhism

The Kuril, Kureel are a community found mainly in northern India, particularly in the Central Doab and Lower doab regions of the state. Historical accounts associate some members of the community with military service and with the Kshatriya varna. Some Kureels were militant groups as well as traders of leathers and clothes. The Kureel community were Landlords near Kanpur, Fatehpur and Unnao Region Under the Nawab of Awadh and Also Dominants in Regiments Under British Rule. The British also recognised them as a martial caste. During the British period, Kureels served in military regiments and participated in various campaigns, including the Burma campaign, where they fought alongside other Indian troops in the Allied forces against Japanese forces. Their participation contributed to the Allied military operations that ultimately defeated Japanese forces in Burma and ended Japanese occupation of large parts of the region. Even after being from a Kshatriya clan, Kureels faced social restrictions from dominant caste communities, while many maintained their social position through military service under Mughal and British rule. The British recognised Kureels for their martial traditions. During the British period, Kureel soldiers served alongside other Indian troops in various military campaigns, and fought against Japanese and other forces, contributing to their defeat and serving the nation through their military service; that is why the British were impressed with them and formed their army regiment. Kureels also took part in industrial revolution during the British era; they sell large amounts of leather and related products. During the Mughal era they also made leather armour, water bottles, and other leather products; that is why some Kureels gained status by owning land with the help of business profits. Many Rich Kureels moved to other countries like UK, US, and Australia.

== Roles ==
Agriculture: The Kureel community, like many other rural communities, has been traditionally involved in agricultural activities. Many Kureels worked as farmers, cultivating crops and tending to livestock. This occupation has been central to their livelihood.

Military and Warrior Roles:

In some regions, the Kureels are believed to have had a historical association with the Kshatriya varna, and some members of the community might have been involved in warrior or military roles in the past. This could include positions as soldiers or local protectors.

Artisans and Craftsmen:

In some areas, the Kureel community may have also been involved in artisan work, such as pottery, carpentry, or other traditional crafts. This would have been in line with many other communities that traditionally practiced skilled trades.

Trade and Commerce:

In urbanized regions, some members of the Kureel community might have been involved in trade and business, particularly as small-scale traders, merchants, or shopkeepers.

Other Occupations:

Like many communities historically classified among the Other Backward Classes, some members of the Kureel community were also engaged in a range of occupations that provided livelihoods within local economies. These included agricultural labour, wage-based employment, artisanal work, and other forms of manual and service-oriented work.

Modern Occupations: In contemporary India, members of the Kureel community, like many other OBCs, have diversified into various sectors due to educational opportunities and affirmative action policies. Today, many Kureels are found in a variety of professions, such as:

Government Jobs: Many members of the Kureel community have moved into government service.

Private Sector Jobs: With increased education, some have found employment in the private sector, including roles in business, administration, engineering, and technology.

Education and Healthcare: Due to increased access to education, more individuals from the Kureel community are going into professions such as teaching, healthcare (doctors, nurses), and law.

Conclusion: The Kureel community has traditionally been involved in agriculture, military, and skilled labor occupations. Over time, Kureels have continued to pursue these traditional avenues while also expanding into a diverse range of professions and fields in modern India. This occupational diversification reflects broader social and economic mobility, alongside increased access to education and opportunities arising from changing social structures and affirmative action policies.

== History ==
The history of Kureel clan is still unknown that how they came into existence but historically they were part of leather tanning community of Uttar Pradesh.

Kureels saw a tremendous growth after British Raj and Kanpur being a hub of tanneries gave a chance to a lot of local leather artisian communities to engage directly in such business at large scale. A lot of Kureels were also in British Indian army and took part in Burma campaign. In 1943, the Regiment was raised which consisted many Kurils from Kanpur, Unnao, and Allahabad regions but it was disbanded in 1946.

The Kureels/Kurils have origin in Awadh region of Uttar Pradesh and primarily speak Awadhi and are spread in various states.

Kureels have been forefront runners of social reforms in Central U.P and have been associated with many movements, e.g. - Adi Hindu movement of Swami Achootanand or Ravidasia movement and later they adopted Kanbir panth by leaving traditional works. Kureel Mahasabha was established in Kanpur which later got dissolved into Social and Political Organisation which was founded by Dr. B.R. Ambedkar.

== Notable people ==
- Mohan Lal Kureel, British Indian Army officer from politician
- Pyare Lal Kureel, Indian Politician
- Pramod Kureel, Indian Politician
- Baijnath Kureel, Indian Politician
- Shiv Narain Kureel, Indian Surgeon
- Jwala Prasad Kureel, Indian Politician
- Saroj Kureel, Indian Politician
