= Purna Chandra Bauri =

Indian politician

Purna Chandra Bauri (born 4 June 1976) is an Indian politician from West Bengal. He is a former member of the West Bengal Legislative Assembly from Raghunathpur, West Bengal Assembly constituency, which is reserved for Scheduled Caste community, in Purulia district. He was elected in the 2016 West Bengal Legislative Assembly election representing the All India Trinamool Congress.

== Early life and education ==
Bauri is from Raghunathpur, Purulia district, West Bengal. He is the son of late Gopinath Bauri. He studied Class 12 at Bhamuria SM High School and passed the Madhyamik examinations conducted by West Bengal Board of Secondary Education. His wife is a para teacher.

== Career ==
Bauri was elected as an MLA from Raghunathpur Assembly constituency representing the All India Trinamool Congress in the 2016 West Bengal Legislative Assembly election. He polled 83,688 votes and defeated his nearest rival, Satyanarayan Bauri of the Communist Party of India (Marxist), by a margin of 16,142 votes. He first became an MLA winning the 2011 West Bengal Legislative Assembly election where he polled 78,096 votes, and defeated his closest opponent, Dipali Bauri of the Communist Party, by a margin of 12,743 votes. Earlier in the 2006 Assembly election, he contested on the Trinamool Congress ticket and lost to Communist Party candidate Uma Rani Bauri.
