= Pasi (caste) =

Dalit community of India

पासी
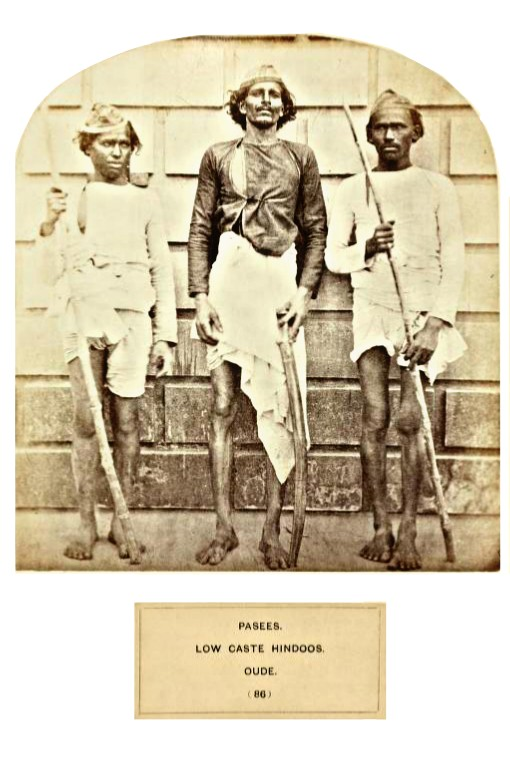
- Pasi youths in Awadh, 1868

Total population
- c. 7.5 million

Regions with significant populations
- Uttar Pradesh: 65,22,166
- Bihar: 7,11,389
- Jharkhand: 72,357
- Delhi: 59,400
- West Bengal: 29,491

Languages
- Hindi, Bhojpuri, Awadhi

Religion
- Hinduism, Buddhism

Related ethnic groups
- Turuk Pasi

The Pasi (also spelled Passi) is a de-notified community of Uttar Pradesh state in India. Pasi refers to tapping toddy, a traditional occupation of the Pasi community. The Pasi are divided into Gujjar, Kaithwas, and Boria. They are classified as Schedule caste in the northern Indian states like Bihar and Uttar Pradesh.

== Etymology ==
According to William Crooke, the word Pashi derives from the Sanskrit word Pashika, a noose used by Pasi to climb and tap toddy, a drink obtained from palm trees. The tapping of toddy is the original occupation of the Pasi community. However, like other aspirational caste groups of India, Pasis have a myth of origin. They claim to originate from the sweat of Parshuram, an incarnation of Vishnu. They claim support for this in the word sweat being derived from the Hindi word Pasina. For social upliftment, Pasis also used this to further their claim of belonging to the Kshatriya caste.

== Population ==
The Pasi live mainly in the northern Indian states of Bihar and Uttar Pradesh, where their traditional occupation was that of rearing pigs. The Pasis of most of the north Indian states have been classified as Scheduled Castes by the Government of India. In the 2001 Indian census, the Pasi were recorded as the second-largest Dalit group in Uttar Pradesh. At the time, they constituted 16 per cent of the Dalit population of the state and mostly inhabited the Awadh region. The 2011 Census of India for the state recorded their population as 6,522,166. This figure includes the Tarmali.

=== Demographics ===
States/UTs	Population (as of 2011)	Sub-groups
Bihar	7,11,389	counted as Pasi
Chandigarh	21,063	counted as Pasi
Chhattisgarh	4,600	counted as Pasi
Delhi	59,400	counted as Pasi (Rajpasi)
Gujarat	4,007	counted as Pasi
Haryana	2,900	counted as Pasi
Jharkhand	72,357	counted as Pasi
Madhya Pradesh		counted as Pasi
Maharashtra	24,664	counted as Pasi
Punjab	39,111	counted as Pasi
Rajasthan	4,025	counted as Pasi
Uttar Pradesh	65,22,166	counted as Pasi, Tarmali
Uttarakhand	19,432	counted as Pasi, Tarmali
West Bengal	29,491	counted as Pasi

== History ==
Ramnarayan Rawat states that the role of the Pasi and other Dalit communities in the Kisan Sabha movement has been understated by earlier historians. He writes that earlier scholarship held Pasi involvement in the movement to be minimal, late-arriving, and more inclined towards criminality and rioting than political activism. He notes that the involvement of Pasi and Chamars was significant from the outset. According to him, the Pasi, being land owners, had the same concerns as other savarna groups, rather than being the 'alienated' pig-rearers as which they had sometimes been characterised. Chandra Bhan Prasad, a political commentator, has said that those who continued pig-rearing were ill-treated by socio-political activists, who blamed the occupation in large part for their untouchable status rather than Brahminism.

The Pasi have in recent times engaged in invention of tradition. Badri Narayan, a social historian and cultural anthropologist, says that

Sources of vision and contemplation are absent without literature. This feeling, along with the growing urge to construct an assertive identity and the sense of being deprived of history, led the Pasi community towards the invention of heroes, histories and myths and their documentation in the print medium.

Of late, Hindu Nationalists (Rashtriya Swayamsevak Sangh and affiliates) have been trying to appropriate different folk-heroes of the Pasi caste as Hindu icons to mobilize the electoral prospects of the Bharatiya Janata Party. Hindu nationalists have supported claims that there was a Pasi kingdom that ruled what is now Uttar Pradesh and Bihar in the 11th and 12th centuries. The rulers of this claimed state include Bijli Pasi.

== Notable people ==
- Bijli Pasi, a king from the Pasi community.
- Madari Pasi was a leader of the militant peasant Eka Movement.
- Ram Naresh Rawat, former member of Uttar Pradesh Legislative Assembly.

== See also ==
- Saroj (surname)
- Dalits in Bihar
- Sanskritisation
- Turuk Pasi
