= Hari caste =

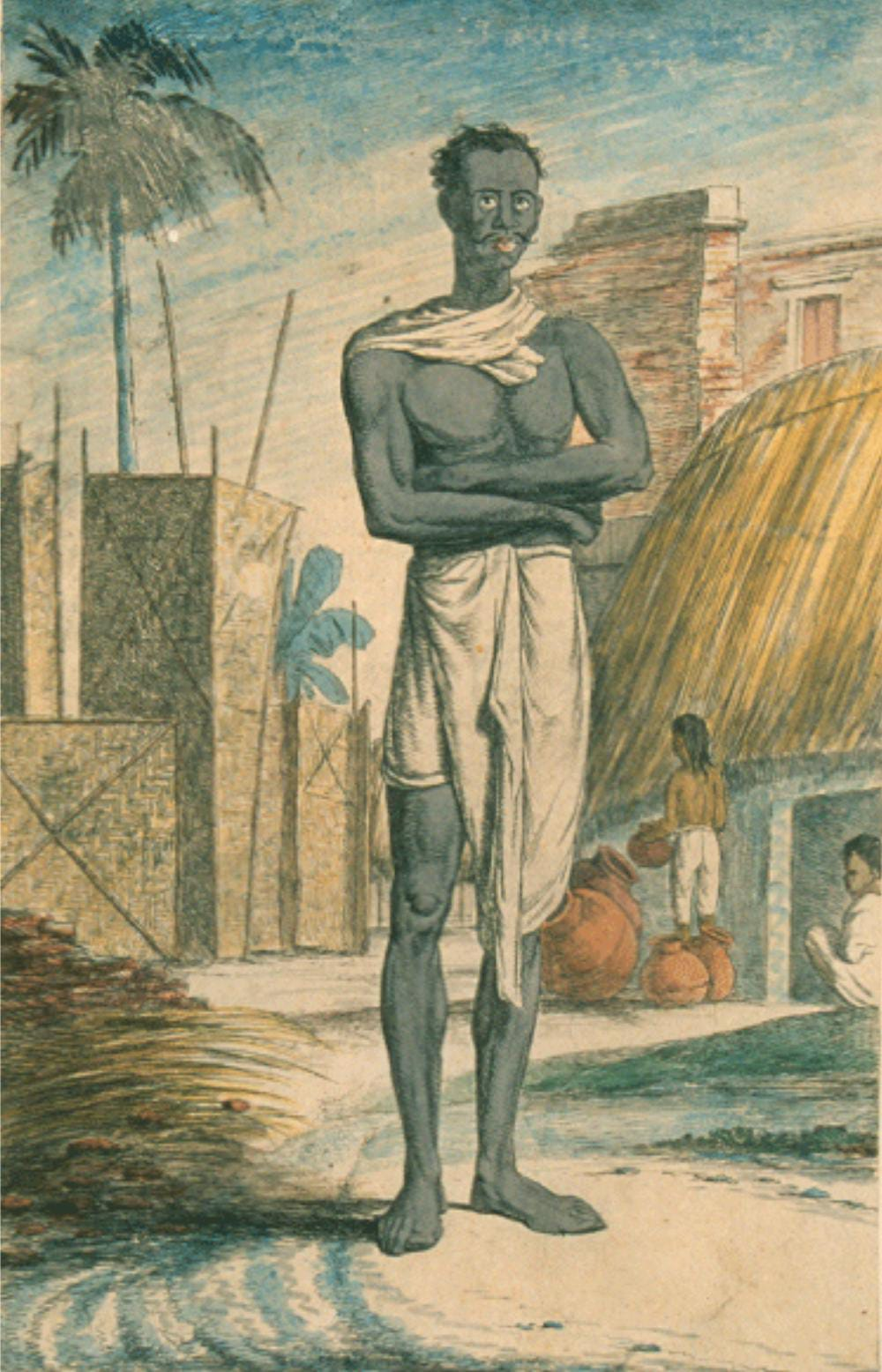
- Hari scavenger, from a 1799 collection of etchings

Regions with significant populations
- West Bengal: 390,619 (2001)

Languages
- Bengali

Religion
- Hinduism

The Haṛi (Bengali: হাড়ি) is a scavenger caste of indigenous origin found in the Indian state of West Bengal and Bangladesh. The Haris numbered 390,619 in the 2001 census and were 2.1 per cent of the scheduled caste population of West Bengal. 49.5 per cent of the Haris were literate – 61.6 per cent males and 36.8 per cent females were literate.

They are similar to the Hela caste of the North and Central India and are primarily associated with the profession of sanitation. Earlier, they were called as Harijan which was a broad term for Dalits.
