= Dabgar =

Hindu caste in India known for crafting musical instruments

Dabgar is a Hindu caste in Gujarat, Rajasthan, and Uttar Pradesh, India, also known as Dhalgar. It holds scheduled caste status in Rajasthan and Uttar Pradesh and Other Backward Class status in Gujarat. In Rajasthan, the community prefers the name Dhalgar.

== History ==
The caste name may derive from dab (pressing animal hides in tanning, a common trade) or the Sanskrit term daravakarra (makers of spoon-shaped vessels).

Traditional accounts suggest the Dabgar originated in Rajasthan, serving in the army until defeated by the Mughal Empire. After the conflict, some converted to Islam, forming the Muslim Dabgar community, while others migrated to Bundelkhand’s rainforests and later the Doab region of Uttar Pradesh, surviving by crafting rawhide jars.

In Rajasthan, the Dabgar craft musical instruments like the tabla, dholak, dhagli, and thap, which use leather, contributing to their untouchable status. They claim Rajput heritage and primarily live in Marwar, speaking Marwari and Hindi. Rajasthan likely serves as their historical homeland.

In Gujarat, the Dabgar, originally from Pawagarh in Baroda District, fled a Muslim invasion and now reside in Dabgar and Sarnagpur districts of Ahmadabad, with smaller groups in Surat and Baroda. They speak Gujarati and Hindi, with unclear ties to North India's Dabgar.

== Culture ==
Dabgar practice endogamy and clan exogamy. The main clans include Shrivastav, Delhiwal, Dari, Sripat, and Kanaujiya in Uttar Pradesh, and Parmar, Rathore, Modi, and Chhatriwala in Gujarat. In Rajasthan, clans include Chauhan (Jodhpur), Deora (Udaipur), and Panwar (Ajmer), each tracing descent from a common ancestor. Most Dabgar are Hindu, worshipping Satyanarain, though some in Varanasi incorporate Muslim prayer practices, and a few follow the Nanakpanthi sect tied to Sikhism. A community association promotes welfare and advocacy.

In Uttar Pradesh, the Dabgar craft hide jars, sourcing hides from the Chikwa community, but many work as wage laborers due to declining demand for traditional crafts. They live in Varanasi, Ghazipur, Azamgarh, Gorakhpur, Ballia, Allahabad, and Kanpur, speaking Brajbhasha in the south and Awadhi in the east.

In Gujarat, the landless Dabgar craft musical instruments and umbrellas. Declining demand has pushed many into wage labor or trade. Some have migrated to East Africa and the United Kingdom, and most follow the Swaminarayan sect.

== See also ==
- Muslim Dabgar
