= Rajuar =

Ethnic group of India

Regions with significant populations
- India
- Bihar: 2,85,485
- Jharkhand: 196,320
- West Bengal: 1,12,184
- Assam: 15,213 (1951 est.)
- Odisha: 3,517
- Bangladesh: 2,327 (2022)

Languages
- Magahi language Regional languages (Hindi, Khortha, Kurmali, Bengali, Odia)

Religion
- Hinduism

Related ethnic groups
- Bhuiya, Bhuyan, Bathuri

Rajwars (also spelt as Rajuala, Rajuad) is a shifting cultivation community. The people of this community mainly live in Bihar, Jharkhand, Madhya Pradesh, Odisha and West Bengal. In Odisha, they are recognized as a Scheduled Tribe, while in Bihar, Jharkhand, and West Bengal, they are classified as Scheduled Caste. In other states, the community is considered part of the Other Backward Classes (OBC).

== Overview ==
Distribution of Rajwar/Rajuar people, 2011 census

The people living in Odisha are mostly from the Nagbansi group and they live in Mayurbhanj and Baleshwar districts. They migrated from places like Dhalbhum, Shikharbhum, and Tungabhum to the Bengal border village of Handibhanga, from where they scattered to the eastern part of the district. According to 1931 census, their population in Mayurbhanj was 1014 and distributed in Nij Majhalbagh (4), Deuli (34), Asankhali (459) and Khanua (44) of Baripada subdivision; Gartal (6), Khauta (69), Saranda (92) of Bamanghati subdivision; Khunta Karkachia (127), Dukura (142) of Kaptipda subdivision; There was no return from Panchpir subdivision and their literacy rate was 0.39 per cent (only four people). However, the Rujwars were predominantly recorded as 159,698 in total during the 1901 census, with significant numbers in Goya (63,189), Manbhum (32,166), and the Chota Nagpur tributary states (21,686). In contrast, in the Orissa tributary states (incl. Mayurbhanj), their population was only 495. As of the 2011 census, they had a population of 3,517 and a literacy rate of 51.6 per cent in Odisha. Many years ago they lived in Chotanagpur and they were engaged in shifting cultivation. Later, They started to live with different ethnic people in a village when they found settleable land to live in the process of shifting cultivation. Now they are occupationally settled agriculturist but some of them are flattened rice sellers.

People living in Odisha speak Odia for inter-community communication but due to their historical migration from Bengali-speaking region, many people use Bengali / Kudmali for daily conversation. The origin of the Rajuar community remains doubtful. While some researchers claim that the Rajuar caste is an offshoot of the Bhuyan, the people of West Bengal claim that the Rajuar caste was formed from a mixture of the Kurmi caste and the Kol caste. As the 1931 Mayurbhanj state census noted that;

The Rajuars are a low cultivating caste of Bihar and Chotanagpur, who are probably an offshoot of Bhuinyas. In the Central Provinces, the Bhuinyas hava a sub-caste called Rajuar. The Rajuars of Bengal give a different story, admitting that they are descendants of mixed unions between Kurmis and Kols. In Chotanagpur, the Rajuars, like the land-holding branches of other forest tribes, claim to be an inferior class of the Rajputs.

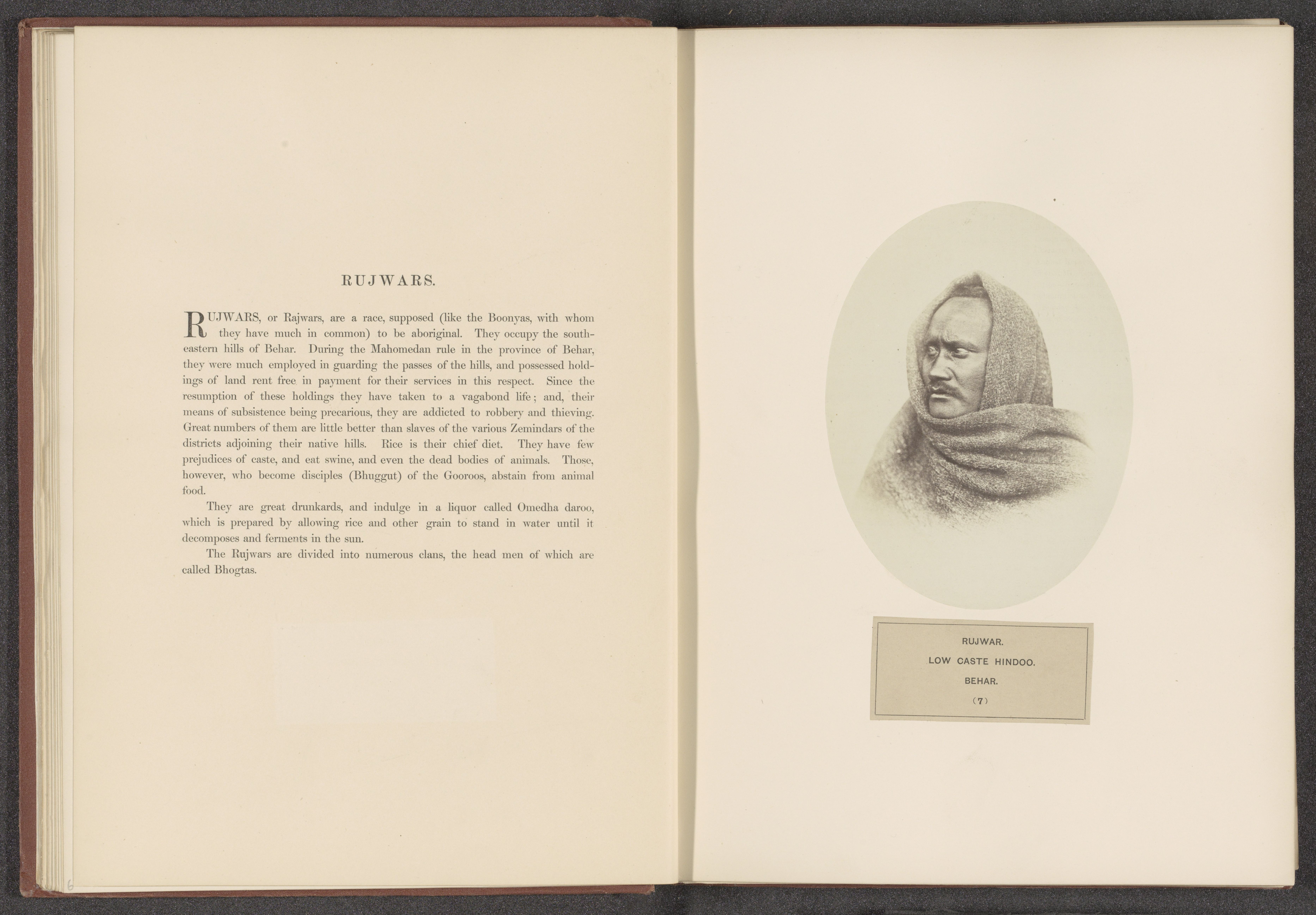
A note on Rujwars in 1858

== Society ==
The Rajuar is divided into endogamous groups such as Bhogta, Lathaur and Nakchedia. Among those groups, the Nagabansi group is lagging in society. Again those groups are divided into some exogenous clans such as Nageswar (Nag), Kachap (Kachim), Sankhua (Sankh), Champa, Mukut (Mod), Sinha and Kashyapa. The surnames used by the Rajuar people living in Odisha are Behera, Ram, Ray, and Parmanik.

The festivals celebrated by the people of Rajuar are similar to the festivals celebrated by the people of the region and are based on Hinduism. Dhulia Festival, Jantal Festival, Magha Puja, Bandhna and Karam Festival are considered the main festivals of Rajuar.
