= Passi (surname) =

Passi is a surname. In India, it is used by the Punjabi Khatris. It is also a surname used by people from the Torres Strait Islands in Australia.

== Notables ==
Notable individuals with this surname are listed below.

- Bryan Passi, French footballer
- Charles Passi, Australian actor
- David Passi, Ottoman spy
- Franck Passi, French footballer
- Gérald Passi (born 1964), French footballer
- Inder Bir Singh Passi, Indian mathematician
- Kamal Passi (born 1992), Indian cricketer
- Luca Passi, Italian priest
- Miguel Passi, Argentine cyclist
- Nitin Passi, British businessman
- Passi, French hip hop artist
- Passi de Preposulo, Italian noble family
- Pierre Passi, Congolese politician and diplomat
- Poey Passi, Australian Anglican priest
- Raj Narain Passi, Indian politician
- Saurabh Passi, Indian cricketer
- Sumeet Passi, Indian association footballer

== See also ==
- Pasi (surname)
