= Chaupal (caste) =

Bihari Dalit caste

The Chaupal or Choupal are a farmer and weaver caste mainly present in Indian state of Bihar. They are recognized as Scheduled Caste in state of Bihar and Jharkhand. They are also present in Assam, Odisha and West Bengal.

== Notable members ==
- Kameshwar Choupal, former Member of Parliament from Darbhanga
- Chandrahas Chaupal, former Member of Legislative Assembly from Singheswar
