= Bijli Pasi =

Indian folk hero

Maharaja Bijli Pasi महाराजा बिजली पासी
- Maharaja of Bijnor
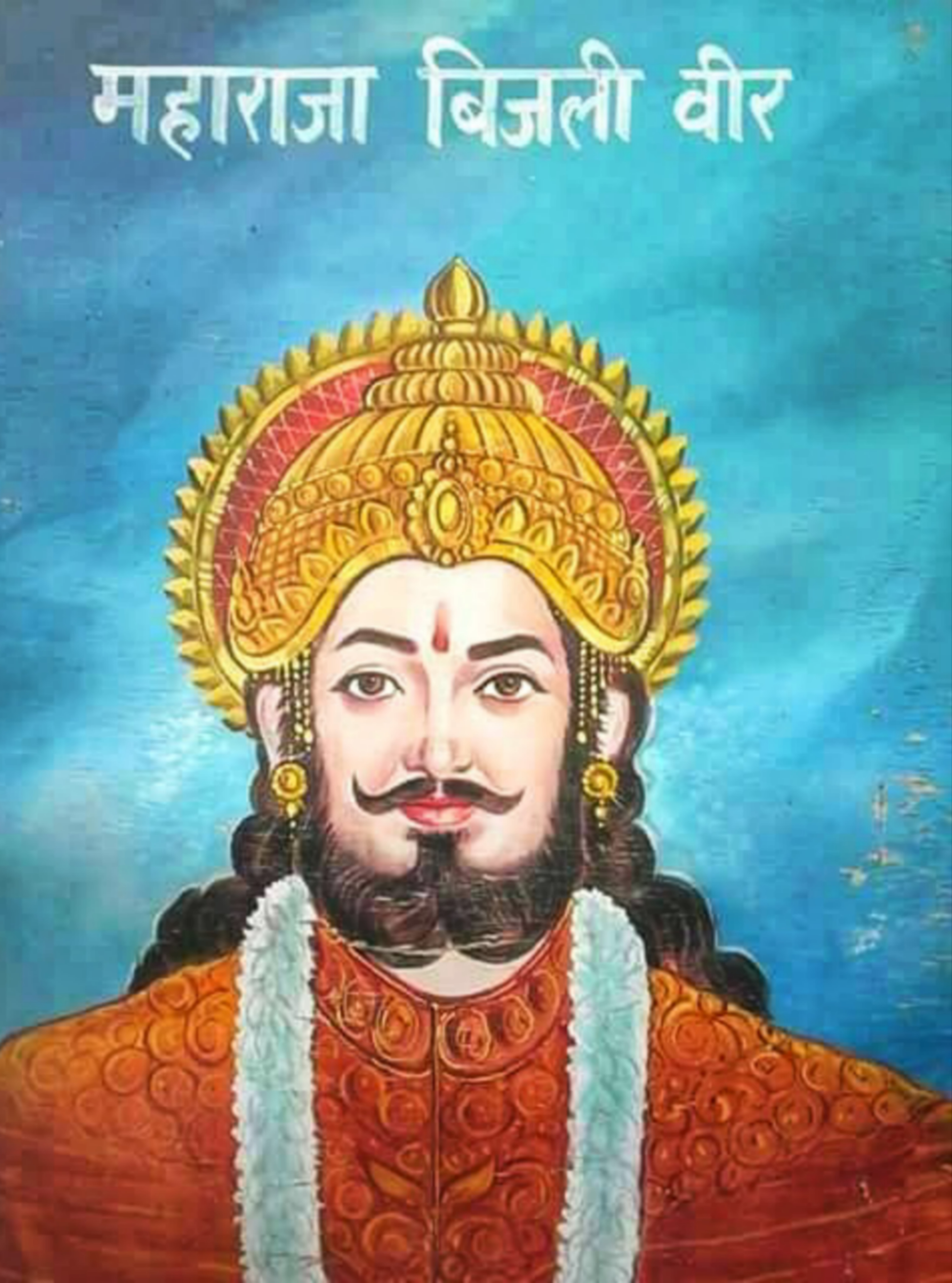
- Religion: Shaivism, part of Hinduism

Maharaja Bijli Pasi was a king from the Pasi community, According to popular belief, he ruled part of what is now Uttar Pradesh.

== Life ==
Historical evidence for the existence of a king named Bijli Pasi is lacking. However, in 2000, the Department of Posts, Government of India issued a commemorative stamp about him. The move was influenced by the caste upliftment movement of Pasis under the leadership of Dalit leader Ram Vilas Paswan. According to the stamp, Bijli Pasi founded the city of Bijnor in Uttar Pradesh.It is said that he consolidated his position when northern India was divided into several small states prior to the fall of the mighty empires of the past.

== In popular culture ==
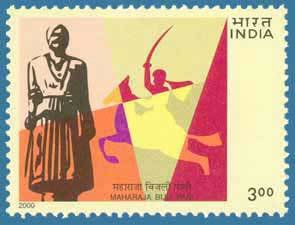
Maharaja Bijli Passi Stamp of India - 2000

The assertion of Bijli Pasi gave voice to the claims of Dalits that in the past there were Dalit kings and that they had a glorious history just like upper castes. The warrior image of Maharaja, often seen upon the walls of various Dalit communities (especially people of Pasi caste) was designed as per the suggestion of Kanshi Ram, the founder of Bahujan Samaj Party. He wanted the image to contain the features of five Sikh gurus, who are also worshipped by Dalit communities to date. The specific feature of those gurus is visible in Maharaja's image, upon careful examination.
