= List of Scheduled Castes in Gujarat =

This articles contains a list Scheduled Caste communities and their population according to the 2011 Census of India in the state of Gujarat.

They constitutes the population of 40,74,447 or 6.74% of total population of the state. The Government of Gujarat recognises 35 castes under the category.

== List ==
1. Ager
2. Bakad, Bant
3. Balahi, Balai
4. Bawa-Dedh, Dedh-Sadhu
5. Bhambi, Bhambhi, Asadaru, Asodi, Chamadia, Chamar, Chamar-Ravidas, Chambhar, Chamgar, Haralayya, Harali, Khalpa, Machigar, Mochigar, Madar, Madig, Mochi (in Dangs district and Umergaon Taluka of Valsad district only), Nalia, Telugu Mochi, Kamati Mochi, Ranigar, Rohidas, Rohit, Samgar
6. Bhangi, Mehtar
7. Bhangi, Mehtar, Olgana, Rukhi, Malkana, Halalkhor, Lalbegi, Balmiki, Korar, Zadmalli, Barwashia, Barwasia, Jamphoda, Zampada, Zampda, Rushi, Valmiki
8. Chalvadi, Channayya
9. Chenna Dasar, Holaya Dasar
10. Chikwa, Chikvi
11. Dangashia
12. Dhor, Kakkayya, Kankayya
13. Garmatang
14. Garoda, Garo
15. Halleer
16. Halsar, Haslar, Hulasvar, Halasvar
17. Holar, Valhar
18. Holaya, Holer
19. Koli, Kori
20. Kotwal (in Bhind, Dhar, Dewas, Guna, Gwalior, Indore, Jhabua, Khargone, Mandsaur, Morena, Rajgarh, Ratlam, Shajapur, Shivpuri, Ujjain and Vidisha districts)
21. Lingader
22. Mahar, Taral, Dhegu Megu
23. Mahyavansi, Dhed, Dhedh, Vankar, Maru Vankar, Antyaj
24. Mang, Matang, Minimadig
25. Mang-Garudi
26. Meghval, Meghwal, Menghvar
27. Mukri
28. Nadia, Hadi
29. Pasi
30. Senva, Shenva, Chenva, Sedma, Rawat
31. Shemalia
32. Thori
33. Tirgar, Tirbanda
34. Turi
35. Turi Barot, Dedh Barot

== Demographics ==
=== Community wise ===
Scheduled Castes		Population (2011)	
Code	Community	Total population	%age of total
1.	Ager	261	0.006
2.	Bakad, Bunt	88	0.002
3.	Bawa-Dedh, Dhedh-Sadhu	9,831	0.241
4.	Bhambi, Chamar, Rohit, Madiga, Mochi, Ravidas, Khalpa, Haralayya, Madar, etc.	10,32,128	25.331
5.	Bhangi, Mehtar, Olgana, Valmiki, Rishi, Zampada, Zadmalli, etc.	4,39,444	10.785
6.	Chalavadi, Channayya	109	0.003
7.	Holeya (Chenna Dasar, Holaya Dasar)	69	0.001
8.	Dangashia	3,446	0.085
9.	Dhor, Kankayya	182	0.004
10.	Garmatang	225	0.005
11.	Garoda, Garo	72,948	1.790
12.	Halleer	95	0.002
13.	Halsar, Haslar	66	0.001
14.	Holar, Valhar	637	0.015
15.	Holeya, Holer	66	0.001
16.	Lingader	36	<0.001
17.	Mahar, Taral, Dhegu Megu	28,417	0.697
18.	Mahyavanshi, Dhedh, Maru Vankar	16,08,359	39.474
19.	Mang, Matang	13,203	0.324
20.	Mang-Garudi	587	0.014
21.	Meghwal, Meghvanshi	2,21,424	5.434
22.	Mukri	77	0.002
23.	Nadia, Hadi	50,331	1.235
24.	Pasi	4,007	0.098
25.	Shenva, Chenva	1,16,307	2.855
26.	Shemalia	3,205	0.079
27.	Thori	3,385	0.083
28.	Tirgar	7,648	0.165
29.	Turi	15,443	0.379
30.	Turi Barot, Dedh Barot	16,659	0.409
31.	Balai, Balayi	1,172	0.029
32.	Bhangi, Mehtar	23,273	0.571
34.	Chak, Chikwa	135	0.003
35.	Koli, Kori	30,048	0.737
36.	Kotwal	960	0.023
Generic castes, etc. (those who identified them as Dalit, Harijan, or Anusuchit Jati)		3,70,032	9.081
Total population		40,74,447	100%

=== District wise ===
District		Scheduled Tribes		
Name	Population	Population	Percent	Top 3 largest (by population)
Katchh	20,92,371	258,859	12.37	Meghwal (170,235); Mahyavanshi (18,081); Bhambi, Chamar (11,533)
Banaskantha	31,20,506	327,460	10.49	Bhambi, Chamar (182,690); Bhangi, Valmiki (48,612); Mahyavanshi (38,858)
Patan	13,43,734	123,408	9.18	Bhambi, Chamar (52,650); Mahyavanshi (31,921); Bhangi, Valmiki (17,663)
Mehsana	20,35,064	162,288	7.97	Mahyavanshi (46,046); Bhambi, Chamar (45,676); Shenva (28,026)
Sabarkantha	24,28,589	187,685	7.73	Bhambi, Chamar (66,235); Mahyavanshi (65,794); Shenva (17,022)
Gandhinagar	13,91,753	108,608	7.80	Mahyavanshi (40,255); Bhambi, Chamar (31,544); Bhangi, Valmiki (10,838)
Ahmedabad	72,14,225	759,483	10.53	Mahyavanshi (325,907); Bhambi, Chamar (178,804); Bhangi, Valmiki (147,470)
Surendranagar	17,56,268	179,461	10.22	Mahyavanshi (79,101); Bhambi, Chamar (55,063); Bhangi, Valmiki (12,051)
Rajkot	38,04,558	290,169	7.63	Mahyavanshi (149,409); Bhambi, Chamar (74,150); Bhangi, Valmiki (22,288)
Jamnagar	21,60,119	173,895	8.05	Mahyavanshi (87,587); Bhambi, Chamar (34,495); Meghwal (16,451)
Porbandar	5,85,449	51,830	8.85	Mahyavanshi (40,209); Bhangi, Valmiki (3,440); Bhambi, Chamar (3,033)
Junagadh	27,43,082	265,793	9.69	Mahyavanshi (161,775); Bhambi, Chamar (45,680); Bhangi, Valmiki (18,714)
Amreli	15,14,190	132,915	8.78	Mahyavanshi (72,465); Bhambi, Chamar (39,058); Bhangi, Valmiki (9,661)
Bhavnagar	28,80,365	157,034	5.45	Mahyavanshi (67,062); Bhambi, Chamar (48,434); Bhangi, Valmiki (22,150)
Anand	20,92,745	104,465	4.99	Mahyavanshi (37,464); Bhambi, Chamar (24,174); Bhangi, Valmiki (17,769)
Kheda	22,99,885	115,631	5.03	Mahyavanshi (35,026); Bhambi, Chamar (28,207); Bhangi, Valmiki (18,049)
Panchmahal	23,90,776	100,446	4.20	Mahyavanshi (42,552); Bhangi, Valmiki (18,239); Bhambi, Chamar (17,267)
Dohad	21,27,086	41,444	1.95	Bhangi, Valmiki (14,734); Bhambi, Chamar (11,251); Mahyavanshi (5,759)
Vadodara	41,65,626	221,629	5.32	Mahyavanshi (109,484); Bhambi, Chamar (34,589); Bhangi, Valmiki (32,877)
Narmada	5,90,297	8,733	1.48	Mahyavanshi (3,766); Bhambi, Chamar (2,574); Bhangi, Valmiki (1,300)
Bharuch	15,51,019	62,235	4.01	Mahyavanshi (34,796); Bhambi, Chamar (10,474); Bhangi, Valmiki (7,633)
The Dangs	2,28,291	992	0.43	Bhambi, Chamar (311); Mahar (251); Bhangi, Valmiki (223)
Navsari	13,29,672	35,464	2.67	Mahyavanshi (19,795); Bhambi, Chamar (7,292); Bhangi, Valmiki (3,206)
Valsad	17,05,678	38,237	2.24	Mahyavanshi (21,623); Bhambi, Chamar (6,473); Bhangi, Valmiki (2,208)
Surat	60,81,322	158,115	2.60	Mahyavanshi (71,079); Bhambi, Chamar (18,248) Mahar (15,663)
Tapi	8,07,022	8,168	1.01	Mahar (2,929); Mahyavanshi (2,446); Bhambi, Chamar (1,223)
	6,04,39,692	4,074,447	6.74	

=== Religion wise ===
Scheduled Castes	Population	Religion		
Scheduled Castes	Population	Hinduism	Sikhism	Buddhism
Ager	261	261	0	0
Bakad, Bunt	88	85	0	3
Bawa-Dedh, Dhedh-Sadhu	9,831	9,817	7	7
Bhambi, Chamar, Rohit, Madiga, Mochi, Ravidas, Khalpa, Haralayya, Madar, etc.	10,32,128	10,30,986	118	1,024
Bhangi, Mehtar, Olgana, Valmiki, Rishi, Zampada, Zadmalli, etc.	4,39,444	4,39,249	71	124
Chalavadi, Channayya	109	109	0	0
Holeya (Chenna Dasar, Holaya Dasar)	69	69	0	0
Dangashia	3,446	3,446	0	0
Dhor, Kankayya	182	178	0	5
Garmatang	225	225	0	0
Garoda, Garo	72,948	72,935	6	9
Halleer	95	95	0	0
Halsar, Haslar	66	66	0	0
Holar, Valhar	637	637	0	0
Holeya, Holer	66	65	0	1
Lingader	36	36	0	0
Mahar, Taral, Dhegu Megu	28,417	20,682	108	6,727
Mahyavanshi, Dhedh, Maru Vankar	16,08,359	16,06,668	229	1,462
Mang, Matang	13,203	13,168	2	33
Mang-Garudi	587	587	0	0
Meghwal, Meghvanshi	2,21,424	2,21,317	19	88
Mukri	77	77	0	0
Nadia, Hadi	50,331	50,320	5	6
Pasi	4,007	3,996	6	5
Shenva, Chenva	1,16,307	1,16,273	16	18
Shemalia	3,205	3,191	3	11
Thori	3,385	3,384	0	1
Tirgar	7,648	7,646	1	1
Turi	15,443	15,437	1	5
Turi Barot, Dedh Barot	16,659	16,656	2	1
Balai, Balayi	1,172	1,172	0	0
Bhangi, Mehtar	23,273	23,271	1	1
Chak, Chikwa	135	135	0	0
Koli, Kori	30,048	30,036	3	9
Kotwal	960	955	0	5
Generic castes, etc.	3,70,032	3,68,690	440	902
Total population	40,74,447	40,62,061	1,038	11,348
