= Rohit =

Rohit may refer to:

- Rohit (name), an Indian male given name
  - Rohit Shetty, an Indian film director and producer
  - Rohit Roy, an Indian film actor
  - Rohit Saraf, an indian actor
  - Rohit Dhawan, an Indian filmmaker and screenwriter
  - Rohit Padaki, an Indian film director, writer, lyricist and actor
  - Rohit (actor), an Indian actor
  - Rohit Suchanti, an Indian actor
  - Rohit Purohit, an Indian actor
  - Rohit Bal, an Indian fashion designer
  - Rohit Chandel, an Indian television actor
  - Rohit Khandelwal, an Indian actor and model
  - Rohit Pawar, an Indian politician
  - Rohit Sahu, an Indian politician
  - Rohit Khanna, an American politician and attorney
  - Rohit Chopra, an American consumer advocate
  - Rohit Loomba, an American journalist
  - Rohit Sardana, an Indian anchor and journalist
  - Rohit Sharma (born 1987), an Indian cricketer
  - Rohit Choudhary, an Indian actor
  - Rohit Khosla, an Indian fashion designer
  - Rohit Patil, an Indian politician
  - Rohit Thakur, an Indian politician
  - Rohit Bakshi (actor), an Indian actor
  - Rohit Paudel, Nepalese cricketer
  - Rohit Sharma (composer), an Indian music director
  - Rohit Raut, an Indian singer
  - Rohit Pujari, an Indian politician
- Rohit, a fictional character in the 2012 Indian TV series Teri Meri Love Stories, portrayed by Karan Grover
- Rohit (caste), a caste in India

== See also ==
- Rohit Sharma (disambiguation)
