= Rohit (name) =

Male given name

Rohit (Devanagri: रोहित), pronounced [ˈroːɦɪt̪]) is a given name, typically male, used among Indian people. It is also used in some parts of Nepal. It is mostly used by Jains, Hindus, and Sikhs.

The word rohit signifies the color red. It is derived from Sanskrit, meaning 'the first rays of the sun'. The early morning sunlight usually has a reddish tint. It is also said to be derived from the Sanskrit word Rohitah (रोहित: Sanskrit pronunciation: [ˈɽoːɦɪtɐ]) which signifies a red-coloured deer, a form which Brahma once took.

Rohit is also one of the names of the Hindu God Vishnu when he is said to have first arrived on earth as a beautiful red fish. It appears in the Vishnu Sahasranam (विष्णु सहस्रणाम, '1000 names of Vishnu'). Rohit also means a person who leads his family to growth and development (a commonly held belief in Hindu families). Rohit was also the name of one of Krishna's sons.

== People with the given name ==
- Rohit (actor) (fl. 2000s)
- Rohit Asnodkar (born 1986), Indian cricketer
- Rohit Bal (born 1961), Indian fashion designer
- Rohit Bakshi (actor), Indian television actor
- Rohit Bakshi (neurologist), American neurologist
- Rohit Bansal, Indian entrepreneur and businessman
- Rohit Chadda (born 1982), Indian entrepreneur and investor
- Rohit Chand (born 1992), Nepali football player
- Rohit Chopra, American consumer advocate
- Rohit Jugraj Chauhan, Indian writer and director in the Punjabi cinema and Bollywood film industry
- Rohit Dahiya (born 1988), Indian cricketer
- Rohit Danu (born 2002), Indian footballer
- Rohit Deshpande, American economist
- Rohit Dhruw (born 1982), Indian cricketer
- Rohit Gupta, Indian American film director, producer, and editor
- Rohit Jhalani (born 1978), Indian cricketer
- Rohit Jhanjhariya (born 1990), Indian cricketer
- Rohit Kalia, Indian Australian actor and model who appears in English, Hindi, Tamil, and Telugu language films and television serials
- Rohit Jivanlal Parikh (born 1936), American mathematician, logician, and philosopher of Indian origin
- Rohit Khandelwal (born 1989), Indian model, actor, television personality, winner of Mr India 2015
- Rohit "Ro" Khanna (born 1976), U.S. Congressman from Fremont, California
- Rohit Khare, American computer science entrepreneur
- Rohit Khosla (1958–1994), pioneer of contemporary fashion industry in India
- Rohit Khurana, Indian television actor
- Rohit Kumar (footballer) (born 1997), Indian footballer
- Rohit Kumar (kabaddi), Indian kabaddi player
- Rohit Mehra (cricketer) (born 1978), Indian cricketer
- Rohit Kumar Mehraulia (born 1976), Indian politician
- Rohit Nair (born 1990), Indian film actor
- Rohit Paudel (born 2002), Nepalese cricketer
- Rohit Phalke (born 1997), Indian actor, writer and director
- Rohit Purohit (born 1986), Indian television actor
- Rohit Raj (born 1993), Indian cricketer
- Rohit Raju, Indian wrestler
- Rohit Rayudu (born 1994), Indian cricketer
- Rohit Roy, Indian television star
- Rohit Sabharwal (born 1978), Indian cricketer
- Rohit Suresh Saraf (born 1996), Indian actor
- Rohit Sardana, Indian journalist, editor, columnist, anchor, and media personality
- Rohit Sharma (disambiguation), various individuals with the name
  - Rohit Sharma (born 1987), Indian cricketer
  - Rohit Sharma (composer), Indian film-composer
  - Rohit Sharma (Fijian politician), Fijian politician
- Rohit Shetty (born 1973), Indian film director, presenter, and cinematographer
- Rohit Suchanti, Indian television actor
- Rohit Shukla, major in the Indian Army
- Rohit Talwar (1965–2014), Indian cricketer
- Rohit Varma, Indian American ophthalmologist

== People with the surname ==
- Arya Rohit, Indian model, television presenter, and actress in Malayalam films and television
- Esha Rohit (born 1998), Emirati cricketer
- Damodaran Rohit (born 1992), Indian cricketer
- Minal Rohit, Indian scientist and systems engineer with the Indian Space Research Organisation
- Nara Rohit (born 1984), Indian Tollywood film actor
- Ramalingam Rohit (born 1992), Indian cricketer

== Fictional characters with the name ==
- Rohit Mehra (Krrish), a character in the Krrish franchise
