= Sulagitti Narasamma =

Indian midwife (1920–2018)

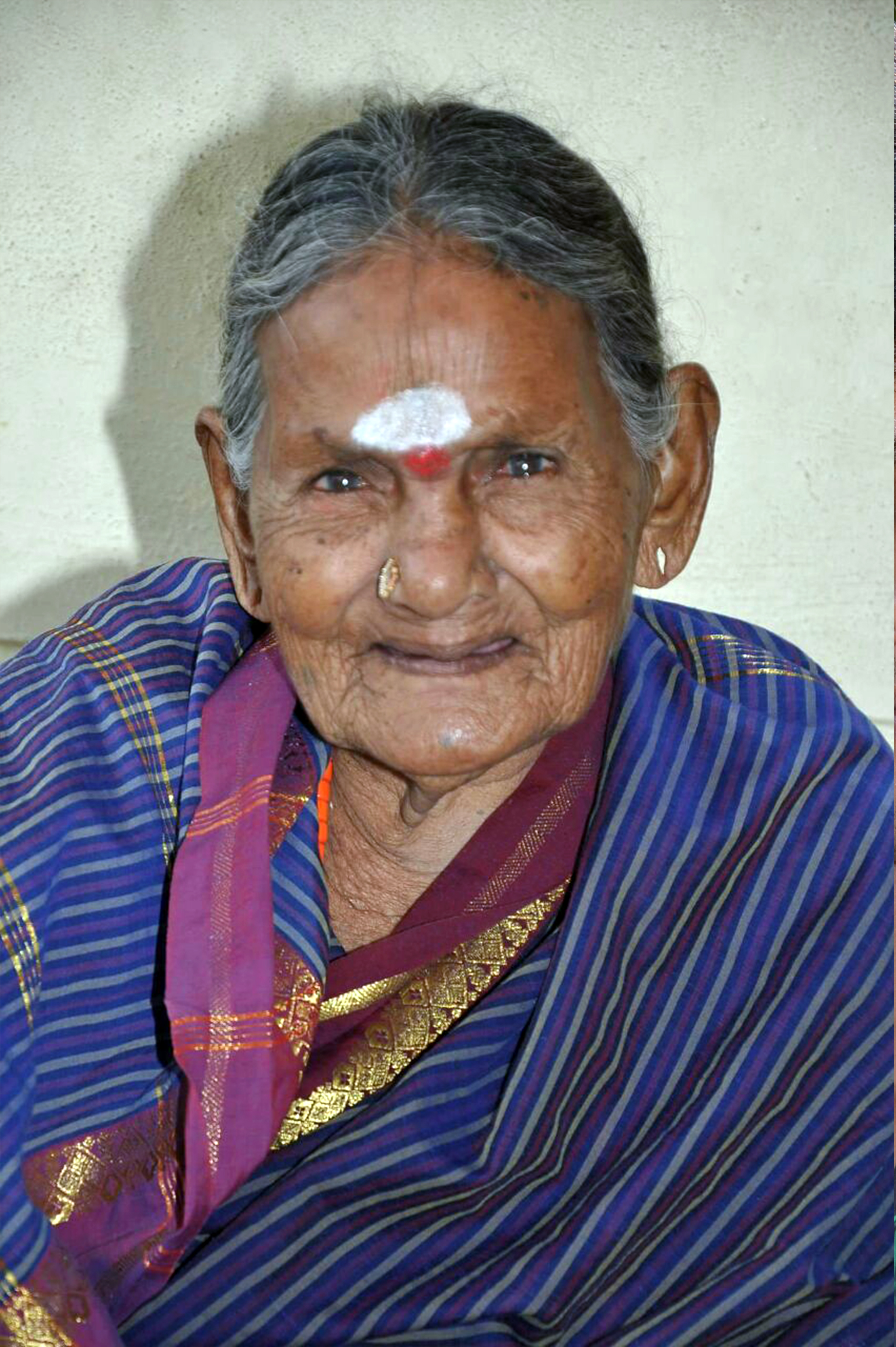
- Born: 1920; Pavagada taluk, Tumkuru district, Mysore State (now Karnataka, India)
- Died: 25 December 2018 (aged 97–98); Bangalore, Karnataka, India
- Occupation: Midwife
- Spouse: Anjinappa
- Awards: Padma Shri (2018); National Citizen's award (2013); Honorary doctorate (2014)

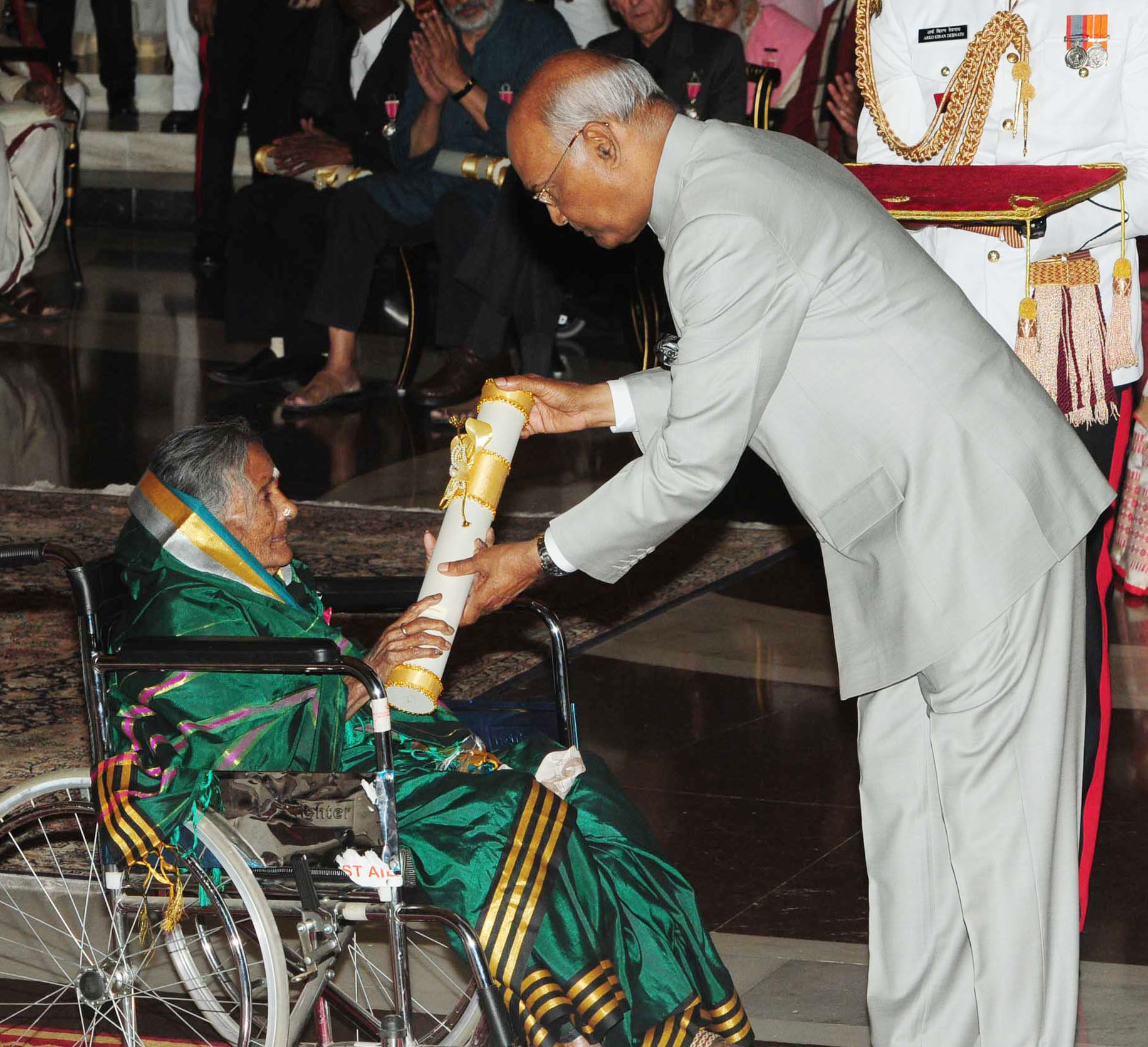
Narasamma (left) receiving the Padma Shri award from President Ram Nath Kovind (right), 2018

Sulagitti Narasamma (1920 – 25 December 2018) was an Indian midwife from Pavagada town, Tumakuru district of Karnataka state. She performed more than 20,000 traditional deliveries free of charge over a 70-year period of service in deprived regions of Karnataka with no medical facilities. Her work was honored with the National Citizen's award of India in 2012 and the country's fourth highest civilian award, the Padma Shri, in 2018.

== Biography ==
Narasamma was born in Krishnapura, Pavagada village in Tumkur district in Adi Jambava community family. She did not attend school and grew up illiterate; she married her husband, Anjinappa, at the age of 12. She had 12 children, although four died when young, and 36 grandchildren and great-grandchildren.

She learnt her midwifery skills from her grandmother, Marigemma, a midwife who also helped to deliver five of Narasamma's own babies. In 1940, at the age of 20, Narasamma assisted at her first birth when she helped with the delivery of her aunt's baby.

Narasamma had the opportunity to keep practising her midwifery skills whenever nomadic tribes arrived at her village. She also learned the art of preparing natural medicine for pregnant women and soon became competent in checking the health and position of the baby. She was also reportedly able to detect the pulse of the foetus while in the womb, without the use of any instruments.

By 2018, and at the age of 97 years old, Narasamma had helped to deliver more than 15,000 babies, and has been described as 'the go-to midwife of Krishnapura'.

== Awards and honors ==
Narasamma received the following awards and citations:

- 2012: Karnataka state government's D. Devaraj Urs award
- 2013: Kitturu Rani Chennamma award
- 2013: Karnataka Rajyotsava award
- 2013: National Citizen award of India
- 2014: Honorary doctorate from Tumkur University
- 2018: Padma Shri

== Death ==
Narasamma was admitted to the Siddaganga Hospital and Research Centre in November 2018 and was later referred to BGS Hospitals on 29 November 2018. She died at BGS Gleneagles Global Hospitals in Kengeri, Bengaluru, Karnataka, on 25 December 2018 at the age of 98 of chronic lung disease.

On 25 December 2018, Narasamma's body was kept at Glass House in Tumakuru for the public to pay tributes, and on 26 December 2018 was buried with full state honours at Gangasandra village on the outskirts of the Tumakuru city. Half acre of the one-acre plot was set aside for a memorial.
