= Karsanbhai Patel =

Indian businessman

- Born: 1945 (age 80–81); Patan, Bombay Presidency, British India (now Patan, Gujarat, India)
- Education: BSc in Chemistry
- Occupations: Businessman, Industrialist
- Organization(s): Nirma Group; Nirma University
- Known for: Founder of Nirma Group
- Awards: Padma Shri (2010)

Karsanbhai Khodidas Patel (born 1945) is an Indian billionaire businessman, industrialist, and founder of the Nirma Group, a company with major business interests in cement, detergents, soaps and cosmetics, pharmaceuticals, packaging, and chemicals. As of 2024, Hurun has listed his net worth at US$9 billion. He has an interest in education and, in 1995, founded Nirma University. Patel was awarded the Padma Shri in 2010.

== Early life ==
Born in 1945 into a farmer family from Patan, Karsanbhai finished his BSc in Chemistry at age 21 and worked as a lab technician, first in the New Cotton Mills, Ahmedabad, of the Lalbhai group and then at the Geology and Mining Department of the state Government.

== Career ==
In 1969, Karsanbhai started selling detergent powder, manufactured and packaged in his backyard. This was an after-office business – a one-man company. Karsanbhai would cycle through the neighbourhoods selling handmade detergent packets door to door. At a price of Rs. 3 per kg, (one-third the price of leading detergents), it was an instant success. Karsanbhai branded his detergent soap, Nirma, after the name of his daughter. After three years, Karsanbhai felt confident enough to quit his job. Later he said, "The lack of any such precedent in my family made the venture fraught with failure. But farmers from North Gujarat are known for their spirit of enterprise." Karsanbhai set up shop at a small workshop in an Ahmedabad suburb. The Nirma brand group quickly established itself in Gujarat and Maharashtra.

The high quality and low price of the detergent made for great value. Fuelled by housewife-friendly advertisement jingles, Nirma revolutionized the detergent market, creating an entirely new segment in the market for detergent powder. At the time, detergent and soap manufacture was dominated by multinational corporations with products like Surf by Hindustan Lever, priced around Rs. 13 per kg. Within a decade, Nirma was the largest selling detergent in India. Since production was labour-intensive, Nirma also became a leading employer (employing 14,000 people 2004). Made without some phosphates, Nirma was also somewhat more environment friendly.

After establishing its leadership in economy-priced detergents, Nirma entered the premium segment, launching toilet soaps Nirma bath and Nirma beauty soap, and premium detergent Super Nirma detergent. Ventures into shampoo and toothpaste were not as successful, but the edible salt Shudh is doing well. Nirma beauty soap is one of the leading soaps, behind Lifebuoy and Lux. Overall Nirma has a 20% market share in soap cakes and about 35% in detergents. Nirma also has successful operations in neighbouring countries.

In 1995, Karsanbhai started the Nirma Institute of Technology in Ahmedabad, which grew into a leading engineering college in Gujarat. An Institute of Management followed, with the entire structure being consolidated under the Nirma University of Science and Technology in 2003, overseen by the Nirma Education and Research Foundation. The Nirmalabs education project, aimed at training and incubating entrepreneurs, was launched in 2004.

Karsanbhai's two sons, daughter and son-in-law are now at leading positions in the Nirma organization: Rakesh K Patel (MBA) looks after procurement and logistics, Hiren K Patel, chemical engineer and MBA, heads marketing and finance, while Kalpesh Patel is in human resources and Healthcare Industry (Nirlife healthcare).

== Awards and recognition ==
In 2019, Karsanbhai was ranked No. 30 by Forbes magazine in its list of India's richest persons. In 2001, Karsanbhai was awarded an honorary doctorate by Florida Atlantic University, recognizing his exceptional entrepreneurial and philanthropic accomplishments.

In 1990, the Federation of Association of Small Scale Industries of India (FASII), New Delhi, awarded him the 'Udyog Ratna' award. The Gujarat Chamber of Commerce & Industry also felicitated him as an 'Outstanding Industrialist of the Eighties'. He has served twice as Chairman of the Development Council for Oils, Soaps and Detergents. Patel was conferred with the Padma Shri Award in 2010. The award was formally conferred by the President of India, Pratibha Patil.

It was also reported by the Times of India on 7 June 2013 that he purchased a 400 million six-seater chopper. After Adani Group chairman Gautam Adani and Zydus group promoter Pankaj Patel, Karsanbhai became the third Ahmedabad-based industrialist to buy a chopper.

In 2017, Karsanbhai was ranked No. 38 by Forbes magazine in its list of India's richest persons ($3.6 billion). In 2019, Karsanbhai was ranked No. 30 by Forbes magazine in its list of India's richest persons ($3.9 billion).

According to Forbes' list of India's 100 richest tycoons, dated October 9, 2024, Karsanbhai Patel is ranked 48th with a net worth of $6.05 billion.
