= Kotagudda =

Village in Karnataka, India

Coordinates: 13°31′N 78°29′E

Kotagudda (Village ID 610601) is a village and nidagal hobli Pavagada tq, Tumkur district, state of Karnataka in India, it is situated 13 km away from Pavagada, Grama Panchayat includes Shaila pur Arakyathan Halli and more villages. There is road which connects to Chitradurga and YN Hosakote. According to the 2011 census it has a population of 3414 living in 771 households. Its main agriculture product is groundnut growing.
