= Rohit (caste) =

Rohit or Rohitas, also called Bhambi Rohit and Bhambi Khalpa, are a Bhambi sub-caste and sub-community from Gujarat, India. They are recognized as Scheduled castes in Gujarat under the category of Chamar and its sub-castes.

Rohit consider themselves to be followers or descendants of the Bhakti Movement saint Ravidas or Rohidas. Traditionally, they did leather or hide work and were identified as Khalpa. But in 1947, a group of Khalpa organized and decided to call themselves Rohit. They also abandoned all leather works but practiced consumption of meat.

From the 1930-40s Rohits were active in changing their caste name from Khalpa to Rohit, like others such as Dheds to Mahyavanshis, Garua to Guru, and Bhangi to Rishi. Though, Mahyavanshis were successful in getting official recognition from the Government of India to get a Kshatriya status officially.

== Surname ==
The Rohit community has number of ataks (surnames) apart from Rohit generally used by them.

== See also ==
- Rohit - a Hindu name.
