= Achammanahalli =

- village
- Location in Karnataka, India Achammanahalli (India)
- Coordinates: 12.3394569°N 76.8800231°E
- Country: India
- State: Karnataka
- District: Tumkur
- Talukas: Pavagada

Government
  - Body: Village Panchayat

Languages
  - Official: Kannada
- Time zone: UTC+5:30 (IST)
- Nearest city: Tumkur
- Civic agency: Village Panchayat

Achammanahalli is a village in the southern state of Karnataka, India. It is located in the Pavagada taluk of Tumkur district in Karnataka.

== See also ==
- Tumkur
- Districts of Karnataka
