= Nagulamadaka =

Village in Karnataka, India

Coordinates: 14°11′9.58″N 77°22′10.24″E

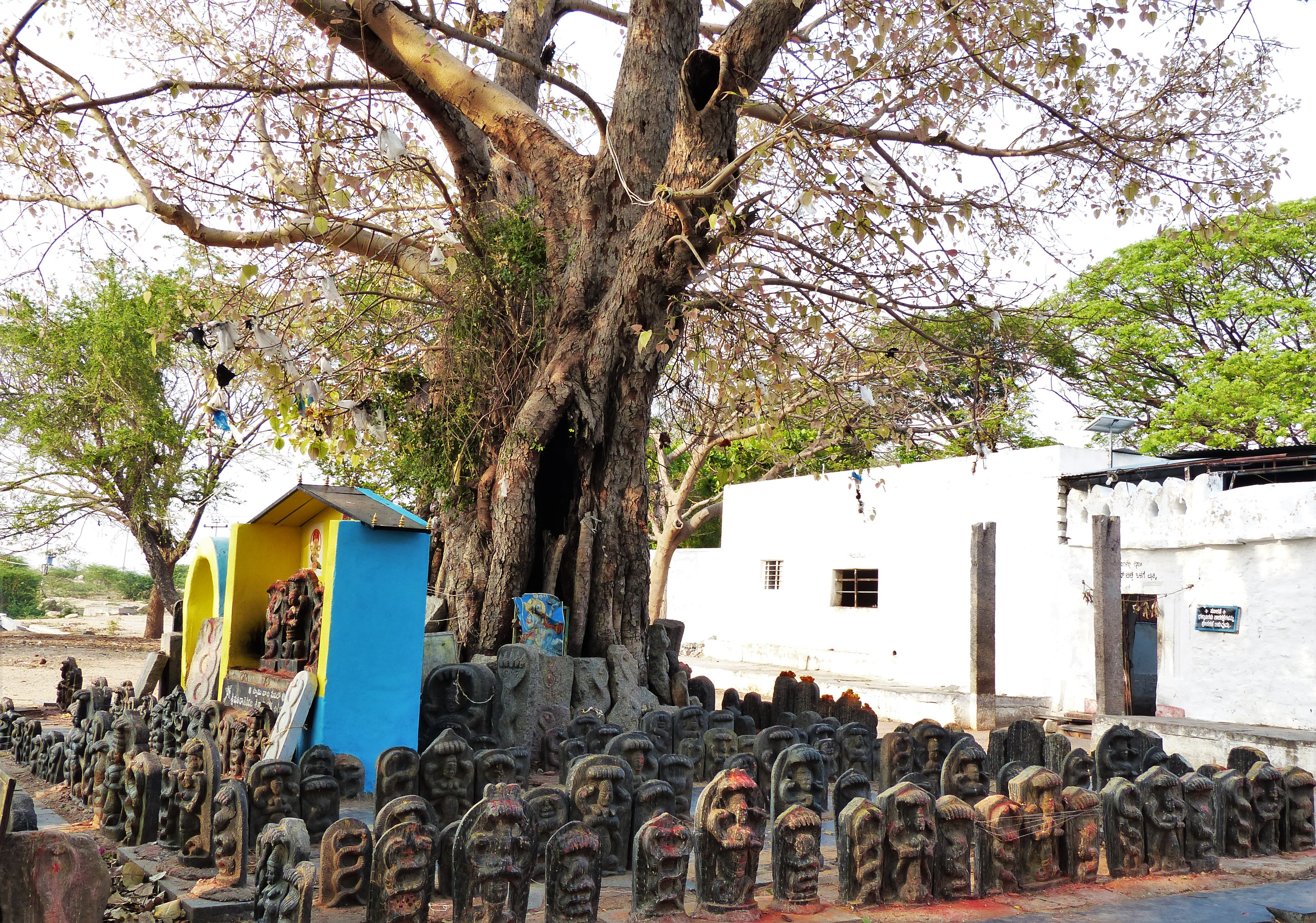
Subramanya Swamy Temple at Nagulamadaka

Nagalamadaka is a small village in Pavagada taluk the state of Karnataka in India. This is considered to be one of the holiest places for the devotees of Lord Subramanya (Younger son of Lord Shiva). There are three main temples of Lord Subramanya and the idol in each temple is known with a name in each temple. Lord Aadi (first) Subramanya is located in Kukke Subramanya temple, Lord Madhya (middle) Subramanya is located in Ghati Subramanya temple and Lord Anthya (last) Subramanya is located in Nagalamadaka Subramanya Swaami Temple. Devotees worship Lord who is in the form of Seven headed snake. This place is also known as Nagalamadike. Nagalamadake is 14 km from Pavagada town.
