= Abhiyum Naanum =

Abhiyum Naanum (lit. 'Abhi and Me') may refer to:

- Abhiyum Naanum (film), a 2008 Indian Tamil-language film
- Abhiyum Naanum (TV series), a 2020 Indian Tamil-language soap opera

== See also ==
- Abhiyum Njanum, a 2013 Indian Malayalam-language film
