= Veerahanumakkanapalya =

Veerahanumakkanapalya (V H Palya)
- village
- Location in Karnataka, India Veerahanumakkanapalya (India)
- Coordinates: 14°3′57.77″N 77°4′54.07″E
- Country: India
- State: Karnataka
- District: Tumkur
- Talukas: Pavagada

Languages
  - Official: Kannada
- Time zone: UTC+5:30 (IST)
- PIN: 572116
- Telephone code: 91-8136
- Nearest city: Tumkur
- Lok Sabha constituency: Chitradurga
- Vidhan Sabha constituency: Pavagada

Veerahanumakkanapalya is a village in Pavagada taluk of Tumkur district in Indian state of Karnataka. Located on the Pavagada-Sira road at 24 kilometers from Pavagada, it is only 1 kilometer away from Mangalavada. Veerahanumakkanapalya and Mangalavada are twin villages. Its PIN code is 572116.

== History ==
The place derives its name from the village Goddess Veerahanumakka. The place is near to another important village MADDE, 2 km away

== Culture ==
This is a typical Kannada village with mostly Hindu population. People speak Kannada with an exception of people of some castes speaking Telugu. The village celebrates all the Hindu festivals especially Sankranthi, Yugadi (Ugadi), Deepavali (Diwali) and Shivaratri. The annual festival of the village is called "Veerahanumakkana Jathre".

== Education ==
The government school has classes till fourth standard. For middle school and high school one has to go to Mangalavada.

== Geography ==
It is mostly a dry land with less rain fall than the national average. The place is full of small hills.

== Economy ==
The primary source of income for villagers is agriculture. This village houses two small industries one for polythene sheet making and the other is to process groundnut oil.

== See also ==
- Pavagada
- Tumkur
- Tumkur District
- Taluks of Karnataka
