= Yallappa Nayakana Hosakote =

Y. N. Hosakote Yallappa Nayakana Hosakote
- town
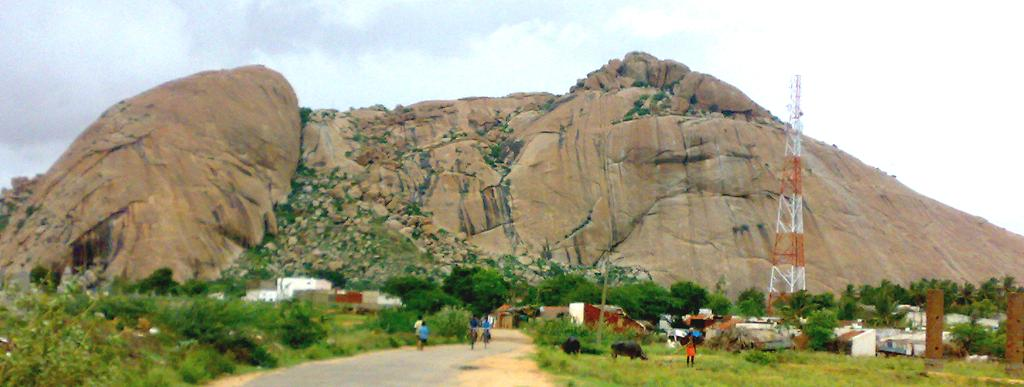
- A road view of Hosakote
- Interactive map of Y. N. Hosakote
- Country: India
- State: Karnataka
- District: Tumkur
- Taluka: Pavagada

Population (2015)
  - Total: 32,779

Languages
  - Official: Kannada
- Time zone: UTC+5:30 (IST)

Yallappa Nayakana Hosakote, often written as Y. N. Hosakote is a small town in the southern state of Karnataka, India. It is located in the Pavagada taluk of Tumkur district in Karnataka. In 1556 a local king named Yallappa Nayaka founded the fort on the hill Siddarabetta beside Kundurpi, named Yallappanayakana hosakote.

Official website: https://ynhosakote.in

== Demographics ==
As of the 2011 India census, Y. N. Hosakote had a population of 12593 with 6423 males and 6170 females.

The nearest town is Pavagada, 29 kilometres (18 mi) from Y.N.Hosakote. The village has its own panchayat, police station, and post office. Its pin code is 572141. District headquarters of the town is Tumkur which is 135 kilometres (84 mi) away. The siddalubetta is a monolithic hill at Y N Hosakote.

== Economy ==
This town's main business is agriculture and also silk saree (handlooms). Many people are self employed with hand-looms and now(2023) some are using power looms. Designing for the silk sarees and coloring the silk is the main business here.

During the rainy season, the main craft is ground nut which is grown on the dry land.

== See also ==
- Tumkur
- Districts of Karnataka
