= Naliganahalli =

Village in Karnataka, India

Coordinates: 14°06′N 77°14′E

Naliganahalli is a village in the Tumkur district of Karnataka, India. The village is located about 105 kilometres (65 mi) from Tumakuru, the district centre, and about 5 kilometres (3.1 mi) from the taluk of Pavagada. The village's name is derived from the Kannada words for "dance" ("nali") and "sing" ("gana"), reflecting the village's rich culture. The total area of the village is 893.71 hectares. Naliganahalli has a population of 903 males, 947 females, and 175 children, for a total of 2,025 people. There are about 429 houses in Naliganahalli village.

Naliganahalli serves as the main panchayat, or village council, in the grama panchayath of which it and seven surrounding towns are members. It is home to one government primary school.

This village is famous for its Durga Devi fair (which happens once every twenty years) and which unites people from several surrounding villages in the district.

The village also contains a 600-year-old Shiva temple as well as a newly constructed Durga temple.
