= Dhedh =

Indian caste

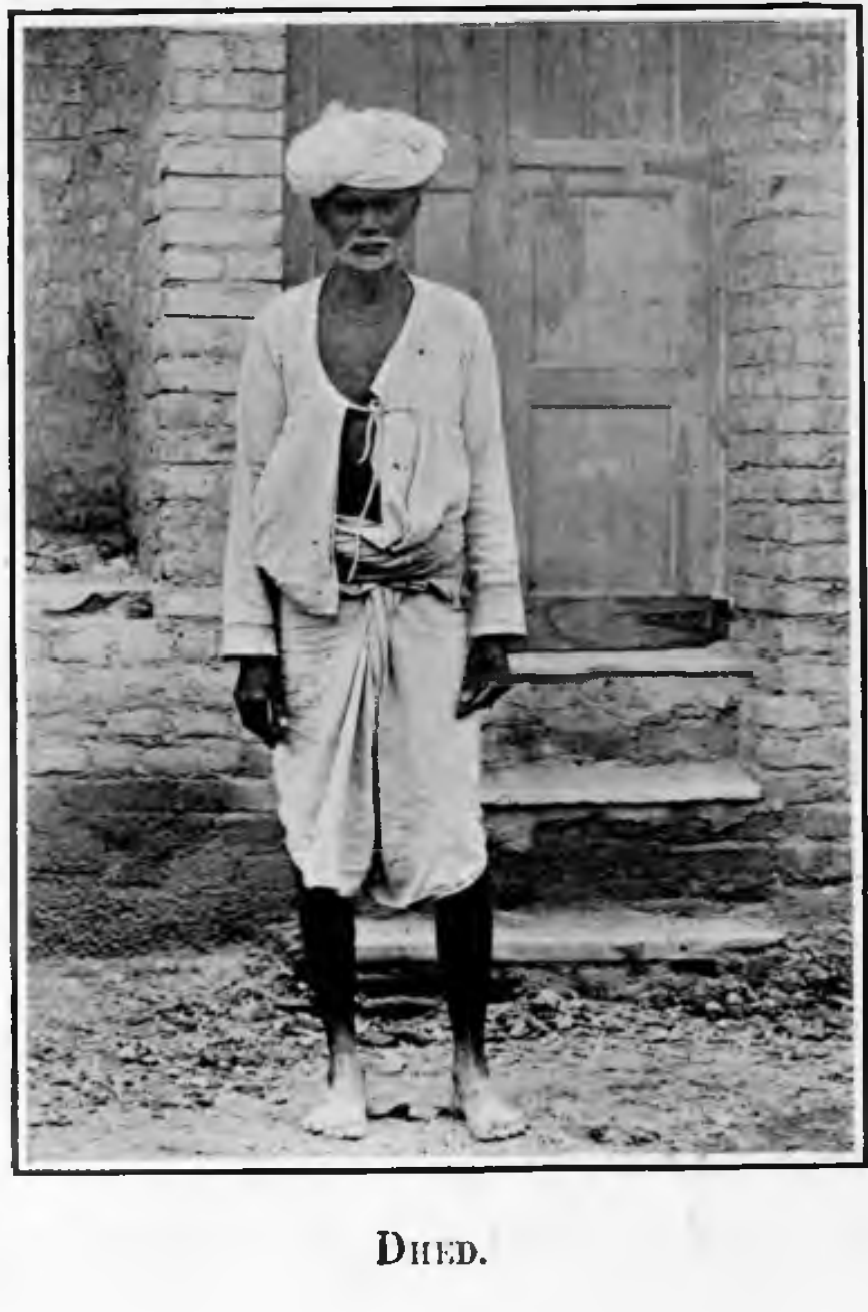
A Dhedh man from Baroda State, 1911.

The Dhedh are a menial worker and weaving caste of India. Historically, other Hindu communities considered them to be an untouchable group, outside the Hindu caste system referred to as varna. This community observes the concept of untouchability in relationships with other low-status castes. The community are sometimes referred to as vankars.

In the 1930s-40s, many depressed classes and communities attempted to change their caste and elevate their social status to that of the Rajputs, a noble class of warriors (kshatriyas). These included the Khalpa, who wanted to be known as Rohit, and the Bhangi's desire to be known as Rishi, as well as the Vankar claim to Mahyavanshi status. Of these, only the Mahyavanshi claim was successful in gaining official recognition from the colonial administration of the British Raj. This success was limited to a part of the community in South Gujarat.

In 1909, the Dhedh Sabha was established in Ahmedabad to abolish the practices of drinking alcohol, eating meat, and eating the leftovers of higher castes at social functions. Breman notes these efforts generally had little effect.

In Charotar, Dheds were formerly weavers whose livelihoods were ruined by the introduction of mill-cloth. According to Pocock, the Dheds were considered untouchable because their cloth was treated with bone size. The majority of Charotar Dhedhs are Catholic Christians (due to missionary activity) and a minority who remain Hindus. Both consider themselves superior to Chamars and Bhangis.

The term dhedh as a form of address is considered derogatory, and is punishable under the Atrocities Act, 1989 as a form of casteist abuse.

== See also ==
- Makanji Kuber Makwana
