= Byadanur =

Coordinates: 14°05′N 77°13′E

- village
- Interactive map of Byadanur
- Country: India
- State: Karnataka
- District: Tumkur
- Talukas: Pavagada

Population (2001)
  - Total: 5,105

Languages
  - Official: Kannada
- Time zone: UTC+5:30 (IST)

Byadanur is a village in the southern state of Karnataka, India. It is located in the Pavagada taluk of Tumkur district in Karnataka.

== Demographics ==
As of 2001 India census, Byadanur had a population of 5105 with 2601 males and 2504 females.

== See also ==
- Tumkur
- Districts of Karnataka
