= Bhambi Sindhi Mochi =

Hindu caste found in Gujarat, India

The Bhambi Sindhi Mochi are a Hindu caste found in the state of Gujarat in India. They are also known as Sindhi Mochi. The Bhambi Sindhi Mochi are a sub-group within the Bhambi community.

== Origin ==
The community is said to have originated from Sindh, from where they migrated to Gujarat. In most Indian languages, the word mochi means a cobbler, and they were the traditional cobblers of Gujarat. They are now found mainly in Ahmadabad, and Kheda districts. The Bhambhi now speak Gujarat.

== Present circumstances ==
The Sindhi Mochi are an endogamous community and practice clan exogamy. Their main clans are the Parmar, Solanki, Baghela, Rathore, Gohil and Chauhan.

The majority of Sindhi Mochi are still employed as shoemakers. A majority are now employed as wage labourers. They are a Hindu community, and their tribal deity is Chamunda.

== See also ==
- Bhambi Rohit
- Bhambi Khalpa
