= Makanji Kuber Makwana =

Makanji Kuber Makwana (1849–1924) was a social leader, social worker and a historian, who is noted for writings on the history of the Dhedh caste.

== Life sketch ==
Makanji was born in 1849 at Ahmadabad in a Dhedh community. He shifted to Bombay at the early age of fifteen and later joined J.J. School of Art and became a painter by profession. He opened his own painting shop and amassed a good fortune.

Makanji was deeply disturbed about caste treatment meted out. Community in which he belonged, tried to establish that communities like Mahyavanshi (weavers) were actually Kshatriya caste, which had fallen from grace by writing several researched books starting with Mayavat Rajput Prakash in 1908 followed by several others. These books written by him helped the cause of their caste to get Kshatriya status officially as Mahyavanshi by Government of India in 1939, in which other social and political leaders after his death in 1924, like Dr. Kanhaiyalal Munshi and Dr. Purshottam Solanki played the leading role.

Makanji spent most of his wealth for the benefit of community and philanthropic works. He founded "Kabir Ashram" (Hostel) and "Kabir Temple" named after Sant Kabir in Bombay and declared opened for the community on 11 May 1913, which provided free boarding and lodging for community person till he found an employment in Bombay.

Further, he was also founder of community forum, Mayavat Rajput Hitt Vardhak Sabha in 1910, to unite the community spread across the erstwhile Bombay State and make them aware of his movement to establish the community as Rajputs.

== Books ==
Makanji in his writings stressed that the Mahyavanshi were the descendants of the Hattiavanshi King Arjuna, arguing that it was because of the slaughter of Parsuram they were relegated to a lower caste thus linking them with the Mayavat Rajputs, a branch of Parmara clan of Kshatriyas. There are several books written by him in Gujarati language, as under:-

1. Mayavat Rajput Prakash (1908) (A light on Mayavat Rajputs)
2. Mahyavanshi no Itihas (1910) (History of Mahyavanshi)
3. Mayavat Rajputoday (1911) (The rise of Mayavat Rajput)
4. Mahyavanshi Atle Shu? (1911) (Who is a Mahyavanshi?)

== See also ==
- Mahyavanshi
