= Mahyavanshi =

Indian caste

Mahyavanshi are a schedule caste in India that were previously known as the Dhed and Vankar castes. They formed as the result of the successful Mahyavanshi movement, which aimed to increase the social position of these groups.

== Mahyavanshi movement ==
The new nomenclature of Mahyavanshi was given to a large number of the Meyavat Rajput community in South Gujarat via a Government of India circular in 1939. This was due largely to the efforts of K. M. Munshi, then Home Minister of Bombay Presidency, and Dr. Purshottam Solanki, representative of the Depressed Classes of Gujarat, who stressed that its members were descendants of ancient rulers known as Meyavats. Later, in 1968, after the Indian annexation of Daman from the Portuguese, the community in Daman were given the same status.

In the 1930s-40s, many depressed classes and communities were active in trying to change their caste name and elevate their social status to that of Rajput. These included the Khalpa, who wanted to be known as Rohit and the Bhangis desire to be known as Rishi, as well as the Dhed/Vankar claim to Mahyavanshi status. Of these, only the Mahyavanshi claim was successful in gaining official recognition from the British Raj administration. In some cases, they had a history of working as butlers for members of the various European East India Companies in Surat since probably the 17th century and their success came because they were able to mobilise public opinion and procure support for their cause from both from British and Indian leaders and through books detailing their claimed history. The sociologist A. M. Shah says that the Mahyavanshi "have an elaborate mythology, caste journals, and written "laws" to regulate the affairs of the caste".

A prominent figure in re-writing the history of the Mahyavanshi was Makanji Kuber Makwana, who wrote several works on their putative ancient history and genealogy that linked them to the Mahyavat Rajputs, a branch of the Parmara clan who had ruled in eastern Bengal. He is regarded as the spearhead of the "Mahyavat Rajput Movement", which was the name given to the campaign to "regain" their Rajput status. Books of historical research concerning the Mahayavanshi were mainly published around the first decade of 20th century. These books included Makwana's Mayavat Rajput Prakash (1908) (A Light on Mayavat Rajputs), Mayavat Rajputoday (1911) (The Rise of Mayavat Rajput) and Mahyavanshi Atle Shu? (1911) (Who is a Mahyavanshi?) as well as Phakir Jeevan Mevashi's Mayavat Ranshingu arthat Khudarano Karta.

In a 1931 lecture, Munshi stressed that the Mahyavanshi were the descendants of the Hattiavanshi king Arjuna, arguing that it was because of the slaughter of Parashurama that they had been relegated to a lower caste status. Also Purshottam Solanki, in a speech given in Bombay Legislative Council, vehemently stressed that Mahars were martial races and their occupation was military too in past. He further said, thau were not drags of society but have been rulers of Gujarat and other areas of India in past and were descendants of Kshatriya or Rajput clans and should therefore be legitimized as a Kshatriya clan.

Others involved in this affirming this identity were Garibdasji Ramdasji and other Mahants of Ramanandi sect, Phakir Jeevan Mevasi, besides several of their community leaders spread across Bombay State (present day Maharashtra and Gujarat), Sindh ( Karachi and Raban ), Portuguese India ( Nani and Moti Daman ) and also from South Africa, where their population was living in cities like Johannesburg and Pretoria, who in unison impressed upon the government for revision of their social status.

== Subdivisions ==
The Mahyavanshis are primarily divided into exogamous clans like Mathariya, Aatekar Pardinar, Damania, Kantharia, Barodia, Chaseia, Surti, Kosadia, Khanvanshi, Parmar, Rana, Rathod, Gohel, Solanki, Tawdia and Vaghela.

== Distribution ==
The community members are mainly located in regions of Gujarat, other than Kutch, and in Daman. There are some in Maharashtra and Rajasthan. The population is particularly numerous in Ahmedabad, Dahod, Mumbai and Surat.

== See also ==
- Sanskritisation
