= Ozone (magazine) =

American hip hop music magazine

Cover of Ozone

Ozone was an American magazine focusing on hip hop music coverage from the Southern United States and operated from 2002 to 2010. It was founded in Orlando, Florida in 2002 by Julia Beverly. In 2006, the magazine relocated its headquarters to Atlanta.

The magazine provided early coverage of southern artists including Stat Quo, Pitbull, and T-Pain. It has also included articles on musicians from other parts of the U.S. Ozone, including New York City rapper Saigon on the cover of the April 2006 issue and Chicago emcee Twista on the cover of its January 2006, and October 2007 issues.

The magazine has a small number of staff and contributors. In addition to publisher and editor-in-chief Julia Beverly, features editor Eric Perrin and music editor Randy Roper make frequent contributions. Other contributors include recording artist Killer Mike, Charlamagne, mixtape artist DJ Wally Sparks, Wendy Day (founder of Rap Coalition, and contributor to Murder Dog magazine), Rohit Loomba and DJ ADG.

== Awards ==
The first annual Ozone Awards were held on August 6, 2006, and were hosted by Mississippi emcee David Banner and Miami emcee Trina. Ozone Magazine held its second annual Ozone Award Show on August 13, 2007 at the James L. Knight Center in downtown Miami, Florida, in conjunction with the TJ's DJs Tastemakers Conference. The 3rd Annual Ozone Award and TJs DJs Tastemakers Conference was held on the weekend of August 8–11, 2008 at the George R. Brown Convention Center in Houston, Texas. The awards focused on southern artists mostly and included performances by Lil Wayne, David Banner, 8 Ball, Pimp C, and Too Short. Ozone magazine disestablished in 2010.

== See also ==
- Three 6 Mafia
- G-funk
- T-Pain
