= Thori (tribe) =

Dalit caste

The Thori are a labourer community found in the states of Gujarat, Rajasthan and Haryana in India. They are also known as the Nayak. They are recognized as Scheduled Castes in Rajasthan and Gujarat.

== History and origin ==
The Thori trace their descent from the King Ajaypal, a Suryavanshi Rajput. They claim themselves as commanders in the army of the various Rajput kings of Rajputana and with the time, their position of Kshatriya was degraded after conquests of other Rajput clans. Due to this, they lost their status and were separated from Rajputs, leading to formation of a new identity with the name of Nayak, which is a title for commander.

== Present circumstances ==
They are found mainly in the districts of Ganganagar, and Churu. Their spoken language is Marwari.

They are a landless and economically marginalized community working as daily wage labourers in the industrial and agricultural sector. They have an effective caste council, known as the Nayak Samaj, which acts as quasi-judicial body and deals with intra-community disputes. They are Hindus with Pabuji being their main deity; they also worship Gogaji.

The Thoris of Gujarat are also known as Utloiwala, Batwala and Jhori. They have two endogamous groups, the Makwana and Barasia, and are a nomadic community, moving in bands of ten and fifteen and live in small reed huts. Like other Gujarat communities, they have a number of clans, called ataks. Their main ataks are the Parmar, Makowara, Gatar, Kharkaria, Bhoping, Narodia, and Mangarchi. The community is still mainly involved with the manufacturing of baskets. Their range is northern and central Gujarat, particularly the districts of Ahmadabad, Surendranagar, Sabarkantha, Panchmahal and Baroda. Like the Rajasthan Thori, they speak Mewari.

== See also ==
- Dalit
