= Nirma University =

University in Ahmedabad, Gujarat, India

Coordinates: 23.1281°N 72.5444°E

- Other name: NU
- Motto: तमसो मा ज्योतिर्गमय (Sanskrit)
- Motto in English: "From darkness, lead me to light"
- Type: Private
- Established: 2003 ; 22 years ago
- Accreditation: NAAC (A+)
- Affiliations: UGC
- President: Karsanbhai Patel
- Director-General: Dr. Anup Kumar Singh
- Academic staff: 125
- Students: 9,344 (31 March 2021) (all campus)
- Location: Near Vaishnodevi Circle, Ahmedabad, Gujarat, India
- Campus: Urban (115 acres)
- Website: nirmauni.ac.in

Nirma University (NU) is a private university located in Ahmedabad, Gujarat, India. It functions under the aegis of the Nirma Education and Research Foundation (NERF). The Gujarat Government has granted "Centre of Excellence" status to Nirma University.

The university received the Centre for Excellence status from the Government of Gujarat in January 2022. The university has been recently awarded A+ grade by National Assessment and Accreditation Council (NAAC) in the third cycle of re-accreditation. This grade is a hallmark of very high academic quality, including education, research and extension.

== Academics ==
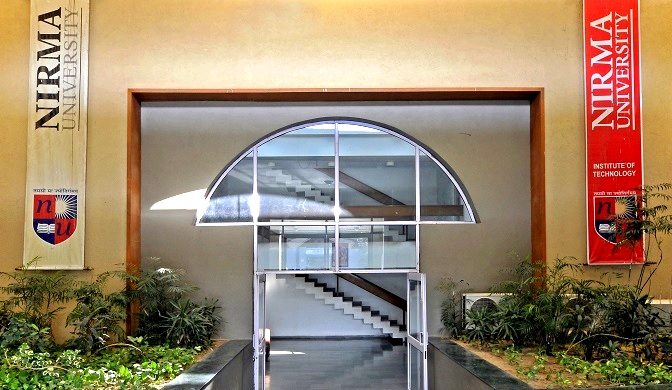
Institute of Architecture & Planning, Nirma University

The Institute of Technology offers B.Tech. programmes. The Institute of Management offers postgraduate, doctoral and executive programmes in management. The Institute of Pharmacy offers pharmaceutical education at the undergraduate, postgraduate, doctoral and postdoctoral levels. The Institute of Science offers postgraduate programmes in M.Sc. in the fields biotechnology, biochemistry and microbiology.

Third year students of Institute of Architecture and Planning, Nirma University have shown extraordinary creativity by transforming waste materials into innovative furniture as part of their semester project.

NIRF Ranking 2024 List : In the management category, 5 institutes from the state are in the top 100, with IIM Ahmedabad being the first. MICA is ranked 32nd while Nirma University is ranked 55th, PDEU is ranked 89th.

Nirma University was awarded the prestigious 5 Star Plus highest rating in the 'University' category under the Gujarat State Institutional Ratings Framework (GSIRF) 2023-24.

University and institute rankings

General – India
- NIRF (Overall) (2024): Unranked
- Outlook India (Universities) (2020): 2

Engineering – India
- NIRF (2024): 101-150

Business/Management – India
- NIRF (2024): 55

Pharmacy – India
- NIRF (2024): 37

Architecture – India
- NIRF (2024): 19

== Notable alumni ==
- Pranav Mistry, computer scientist
- Jay Shah, son of Amit Shah and Chairman of ICC and Former Secretary of BCCI.
- Minal Rohit, ISRO scientist who worked on Mangalyaan
