= Shenva =

The Shenva are a Hindu scheduled caste found in the state of Gujarat in India. They are also known as Sindhwa and Chenva.

== History and origin ==
According to some of their traditions, the community was born out of the union of RawatRajput. There are also other traditions which refer to the Shenva being descended from Rajputs who fled into the forests fleeing Muslim invaders. They are found throughout Gujarat, with their main concentrations are in the districts of morbi, Mehsana, Ahmedabad, Sabarkantha, Kaira, Rajkot, and Jamnagar. The community have scheduled caste status. They speak Gujarati with no particular dialect.

== Present circumstances ==
The Shenva community consists of several clans, each of whom is exogamous. Their main clans are the Vatukia, Gangadia, Morakia, Zalia, Vaghela, Solanki, Makwana, Parmar, Chauhan, savariya and Rathore. The Shenva are traditionally agricultural labourers. Some of them are engaged in the manufacturing of brooms and mats. Like other scheduled caste communities, they suffer from social and economic disabilities.

== See also ==
- Valand
- Vankar
