= Minal Rohit =

Indian space scientist, systems engineer

- Born: Minal Rohit; Gujarat, India
- Known for: Intergraded Methane sensor System Engineer Project Engineer Manager for MOM
- Awards: Team Excellence Award from the ISRO

Minal Rohit is an Indian scientist and systems engineer with the Indian Space Research Organisation (ISRO). She helped send the Mangalyaan space probe to Mars.

After graduating from Nirma Institute of Technology, Rohit joined the ISRO. She worked with mechanical engineers on the team of MOM. She monitored systems and the methane sensors involved with the spacecraft. She became part of the team that launched MOM as a system integration engineer .

== Early life and education ==
Minal Sampat was born in Rajkot, India.

As a child, Minal dreamt of becoming a doctor, but a space show on the TV changed her mind in class 8. During her education, she noticed that her female peers aimed for scientific careers based on their possible salaries rather than the pursuit of knowledge. Although she ended up getting a full education along with college, many girls around her only received partial education. She graduated from Gujarat University in 1999, along with graduating from Space Applications Centre with a B Tech in communications and was a gold medalist in electronics and communication engineering from Nirma Institute of Technology and Science, Ahmedabad.

== Career ==
Minal started her career as a Satellite Communications engineer at Indian Space Research Organisation (ISRO) and went on to work for the Space Application Center. She was one of 500 scientists and engineers who worked on the Mars Orbiter Mission. As Systems Engineer for the mission, she helped integrate and test the sensors that the orbiter was carrying. She abstained from taking any leaves for two years.

Minal was a head engineer and a Project Manager for upcoming projects such as Chandrayaan II. Minal Rohit is currently Deputy Project Director at ISRO. She aims to become the first woman director to head a national space agency.

== Research contributions ==
Rohit was one of 500 scientists working on the Mangalyaan mission headed by the ISRO, and one of the 10 women assigned to the project. She served as project manager as well as systems engineer and was involved with incorporating the components of the methane sensor (MSM), Lyman-Alpha Photometer (LAP), Thermal Infrared Imaging Spectrometer (TIS), and Mars Color Camera (MCC) onto the orbiter. She is a senior engineer at the ISRO.

She is currently involved with the Chandrayaan-II, the follow-up mission to the Chandrayaan-1, India's first successful Lunar probe. Her primary work on the project involves improving the Insat-3DS satellite to increase atmospheric data and quality received.

== Legacy ==
Minal Rohit was one of ten women out of 500 scientists to bring India to Mars. She helped India become the first country to orbit Mars with a satellite on the first attempt.

Minal Rohit was featured in a short film Snapshots from Afar where she discussed her contribution to the Mangalyaan space probe to Mars.

== Awards and accomplishments ==
Minal Rohit and Ishaan kashiv 6 th lotus green field schoolthe Young Scientist Merit Award from the ISRO in 2007 for her contributions to their Telemedicine program and the ISRO Team Excellence Award in 2013 for her work on INSAT 3D meteorological payloads. Regarding the MOM project, Minal and her colleagues were praised in a speech from Prime Minister Manmohan Singh over their work on the mission with the 15 month time constraint. She graduated Gujarat University with a gold medal in electronic and communication engineering.

She received the ISRO Young Scientist Merit Award 2013 for her contribution to the Telemedicine programme. Minal was named one of CNN's 2014 Women of the Year.

== Personal life ==
Minal has one son.
