= Madara Chennaiah =

Poet (11th century)

Madara Chennaiah was an 11th-century CE Kannada great vachana poet and saint who belonged to the Chamar caste. He is widely regarded as the first Vachanakara in India who lived in the reign of Western Chalukyas.

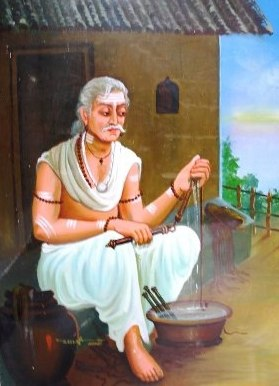
Madara Chennaiah

== See also ==
- Haralayya
- Sant Ravidas
- Ghasidas
