= Rohit Nair =

Indian actor

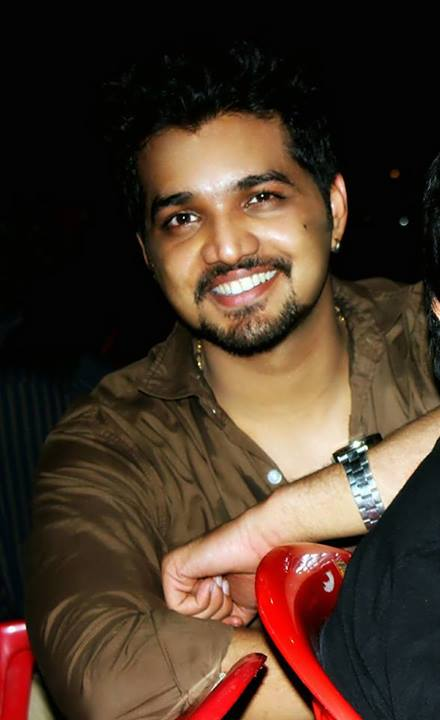
- Rohit in 2013
- Born: Rohit Rajendra Nair; 29 March 1990 (age 36); Mumbai, India
- Other name: Rohit Nair
- Occupation: Actor
- Years active: 2013–present

Rohit Rajendra Nair (born 29 March 1990), known as Rohit Nair, is an Indian actor. He made his acting debut in the Malayalam movie Abhiyum Njanum directed by S.P. Mahesh.

== Filmography ==
Year	Film	Role	Notes
2013	Abhiyum Njanum	Rahul/ Real Sohan Menon	
