= Rohit Sharma (disambiguation) =

Rohit Sharma (born 1987) is an Indian cricketer who plays for the India national cricket team.

Rohit Sharma may also refer to:

- Rohit Sharma (Haryana cricketer) (born 1993), Indian cricketer
- Rohit Sharma (Jammu and Kashmir cricketer) (born 1994), Indian cricketer
- Rohit Sharma (Rajasthan cricketer) (born 1983), Indian cricketer
- Rohit Sharma (Uttar Pradesh cricketer) (born 1968), Indian cricketer
- Rohit Sharma (composer) (fl. from 2005), Indian film-composer
- Rohit Sharma (Fijian politician) (fl. 2018)
- Rohit Sharma (West Bengal politician), Indian politician

== See also ==
- Rohit (disambiguation)
