= Bhambi Rohit =

The Bhambi Rohit are a Hindu caste found in the state of Gujarat in India. They are a sub-group within the Bhambi community.

== Origin ==
The community gets its name from Rohidas, a Hindu saint, and the Rohit are followers of this saint. They broke away from the Bhambi Khalpa community, when they decided to abandon the traditional occupation of the Bhambi, which was shoemaking. According to other traditions, the Rohit are a sub-group of the Chamar community. They are found in the districts of Kaira, Surat, Ahmedabad, and Baroda. The Rohit are a Gujarati-speaking community.

== Present circumstances ==
The Rohit are an endogamous community, and practice clan exogamy. Historically, they used to intermarry with the Bhambi Khalpa, but this has been discontinued. Historically, the Rohit were tanners and shoemakers, but like other artisan communities are abandoning their traditional occupation. Many are now employed as wage labourers.

== See also ==
- Bhambi Sindhi Mochi
- Bhambi Khalpa
- Ravidassia
- Madiga
- Jatav
- Arunthathiyar
- Chambhar
- Mahar
- Bairwa
