= Rohit Shukla =

Indian Army Officer

Major Rohit Shukla SC, SM
- Born: Dehradun, Uttarakhand, India
- Military career
- Allegiance: India
- Branch: Indian Army
- Rank: Major
- Unit: 44 Rashtriya Rifles
- Awards: Shaurya Chakra; Sena Medal

Major Rohit Shukla SC, SM is an Indian Army Officer of 44 Rashtriya Rifles. He received the Shaurya Chakra, the third highest peacetime military award from the President of India, Ram Nath Kovind at the Defence Investiture Ceremony–I, at a ceremony in Rashtrapati Bhavan, New Delhi on March 27, 2018. Major Shukla was awarded the Sena Medal on January 26, 2018.

== Early life and education ==
Shukla is an alumnus of St. Joseph Academy. He got into Indian Army by getting selected through NDA examination.

== Military career ==
On April 30, 2018, Major Shukla killed the category A++ militant of Hizbul Mujahideen, Sameer Tiger in a joint operation by Jammu and Kashmir Police, Indian Army and Central Reserve Police Force. A day before his encounter, Tiger threatened Indian Army, specifically Major Shukla in a viral video. Shukla was seriously injured with a bullet wound on his chest during the encounter and was undergoing treatment as of May 2018.

Major Rohit Shukla has commanded more than 52 operations carried out by the Indian Army against terrorists.

Following the incident a rifleman, named Aurangzeb, who served with Shukla, was kidnapped, tortured, and killed, by terrorists. They subsequently released gruesome video from his torture, on Twitter. In Shukla's unit every soldier was paired with a partner, or buddy, with each member of the pair watching out for the other. Aurangzeb had been paired with Shukla on the mission where he killed Tiger, and this was the reason he was singled out for retaliation. According to the India Times their video specifically shows Aurangzeb being tortured into admitting he was Shukla's buddy.

India Times speculated that the release of this video might trigger India's News Broadcasting Standards Authority to step in to try to control the rebroadcasting of video and audio from opposition elements. The Army had explicitly called on news agencies to refrain from rebroadcasting the video of Shukla's partner's torture and killing, and several agencies rebroadcast it anyhow.

The Army conducted an inquiry, after the video was released, as the identity of the buddies is classified, and the video suggested there had been a breach of security.

On February 6, 2019, Mehbooba Mufti, a former Chief Minister of Jammu and Kashmir, criticized Shukla over his treatment of a civilian captive. She told reporters she had recently visited a youth, in hospital, following interrogation by Shukla.
