= Abhiyum Njanum =

- Poster
- Directed by: S. P. Mahesh
- Screenplay by: Eruva Chandrasekaran; S. P. Mahesh
- Story by: Eruva Chandrasekaran
- Produced by: Ramdas Menon
- Starring: Rohit Nair; Lal; Archana Kavi
- Cinematography: Sudhi
- Edited by: Raja Mohammed
- Music by: Berny Ignatius
- Production company: Mumbai Cine Talkies
- Release date: 31 May 2013
- Country: India
- Language: Malayalam

Abhiyum Njanum (transl. Abhi and Me) is a 2013 Indian Malayalam-language film directed by S. P. Mahesh. Archana Kavi and debutant Rohit Nair play the lead along with Lal. The film is a road movie which revolves around two characters, Abirami (Archana) and Rahul (Rohit) and plots the happenings in the life of the protagonists from morning to evening on that particular day. Despite the title, Abhiyum Njanum is not a remake of the homophonous 2008 Tamil film Abhiyum Naanum. The film released on 31 May 2013.

== Plot ==
Abhirami "Abhi" is a Keralite brought up in Mumbai. She travels to Kerala to meet her cousin Sohan, only to find that he is away. Sohan's best friend Rahul sets out with her in search of Sohan. Rahul makes Abhi pay for his vehicle's fuel. He makes a stop at fast food restaurant and again tries to make her pay for his food, which annoys Abhi. But as they journey, a friendship develops between them. They visit his friend Jose's home where Abhi chides Jose for complaining about his wife to a stranger. They then stop at an old age home where Abhi impresses everyone with her skills at playing violin. They look for Sohan at a beach but encounter goons who try to harass Abhi and take video of her. Rahul beats them up and they continue on their journey. Rahul falls in love with Abhi and admits this to her. However, she gets angry at him, thinking his purpose for being helping her was to have an affair with her. Abhi reveals that she intends to marry Sohan according to her deceased parents' wishes. Upon hearing this, Rahul apologizes. Throughout the journey Abhi reminisces her days spent with parents. She tells Rahul about her parents' death in an accident. Rahul comforts her and they continue their search for Sohan, finding out that he will be at a park in the evening. They spend rest of their day shopping and visiting a temple. Rahul buys a ring not revealing for who it is. In the evening, the goons from beach follow them, as they speed up and escape. Finally, they reach the park where Sohan is. Rahul gives her the ring as a token and wishes her luck as they part. Abhi meets Sohan, but she learns that Sohan has a fiancée, Maya. Abhi does not reveal the purpose of her visit to Sohan after learning about Maya, and sadly returns to the airport, to leave for Mumbai. She contacts Rahul, while waiting at the airport but his number shows up as Sohan Menon in her phone. She meets Rahul at the airport, and learns he is a pilot. She finds that Rahul is really Sohan Menon, and he put up an act along with his friends to test her, as she is from a big city. Abhi slaps Sohan/Rahul but soon forgives him. They exchange rings at the airport. Abhi sees her parents' spirits smile and wave at her.

== Cast ==
- Rohit Nair as Rahul/ Real Sohan Menon
- Archana Kavi as Abhirami
- Lal as Nandan Menon
- Menaka Suresh as Devika
- Rejith Menon as fake Sohan Menon
- Salim Kumar as Jose
- Captain Raju
- Guinness Pakru as Bhadran
- Gayathri

== Reception ==
A critic from The Times of India wrote that the film is "caught between a dilemma of going for a full-blown, jovial romance and at the same time keeping the date with family values. The result is a drab narrative where the lead actors stutter and stumble along, riding bike, climbing hills, shopping and of course romancings".
