= Rohit Loomba =

Rohit Loomba is a hip hop journalist based in Chicago, Illinois. Rohit founded Chinatown Productions with his partner, Mike Li, in 2004. Chinatown Productions has since become the entertainment company through which both Rohit and Mike have launched various hip hop–oriented projects. Rohit is currently Editor-In-Chief of Bumsquad Magazine (the official magazine of the popular hip hop DJ Crew, the Bumsquad DJz), staff at the heavily trafficked ezine allhiphop, contributing editor for WWS Magazine, and a writer for Ozone Magazine.

== Bumsquad Magazine ==
Rohit has interviewed artists such as Paul Wall, Chamillionaire, Papoose, Mobb Deep, Juelz Santana, and Ludacris for Bumsquad Magazine, which he founded in association with the Bumsquad DJz. The debut issue of Bumsquad Magazine found Papoose and Chamillionaire on the covers. In an online interview Rohit briefly mentioned that his harsh criticism of Papoose in the debut issue triggered a less than pleasant response from DJ Kay Slay, who works closely with the New York emcee. It was made clear that words were exchanged, but the extent of the dispute wasn't mentioned further.

== Allhiphop ==
Rohit is also staff at allhiphop.com for which he has interviewed Shawnna, Paul Wall, Trae, and others. In his allhiphop feature on Paul Wall, the popular Houston emcee and Jeweler discussed his trip to Sierra Leone in great detail, commenting on the realities of the diamond trade and the issues surrounding conflict diamonds. The feature was given much attention by fans while some felt that the emcee displayed hypocrisy by continuing to sell and wear diamonds even despite having seen what he described. In his interview with Scarface, Rohit found the legendary southern emcee discussing his exploration of the Islamic Faith as well as the importance of keeping your business straight. An interview with Juelz Santana had the emcee first share that he was working on a full-length album, Can't Feel My Face, with Lil Wayne.

- Pitbull Feature
- Shawnna Feature
- Paul Wall Feature
- Trae Feature
- Scarface
- Jody Breeze
- Bleu Davinci
- Juelz Santana
- Lil Scrappy
- DJ Khaled
- Three 6 Mafia
- Twisted Black

== Ozone Magazine ==
As a writer for Ozone Magazine, Rohit has written features on and conducted interviews with the likes of Jermaine Dupri, Twista, and Lupe Fiasco. Rohit's feature on Jermaine Dupri was part of Ozone Magazine's Top 25 Southern Emcees issue which was done in conjunction with MTV 2 which aired a show coinciding with the issue. Dupri was number 25 on the list for his numerous accomplishments. Rohit's feature on Twista for the January 2006 issue was a cover story in which the rapid fire emcee talked about his then new album The Day After and the absence of Kanye West production on it.

Artists Rohit has covered in Ozone (may not be a complete list):

- Stat Quo
- Twista
- Lupe Fiasco
- Versatile
- 112
- Do or Die
- BG
- Ghosftace
- Lloyd Banks
- Mobb Deep
- Pitch Black
- Belo
- Mobb Deep
- Juelz Santana
- Nas
- Jim Jones

== Platinum Entrepreneur ==
Rohit also contributed to emcee Camron's startup magazine Platinum Entrepreneur with an interview with jeweler Avianne & Co.

== Various E zines ==
Rohit has also contributed to several other popular E zines such as hiphopgame.com and nobodysmiling.com.

== WIIT ==
Rohit was Station Manager of 88.9 FM WIIT, a college radio station in Chicago. As Station Manager of WIIT, Rohit brought in several new shows. Under Rohit's management Atlantic recording artist Lupe Fiasco hosted FNF Radio on Monday nights. The show drew listeners internationally via the station's webstream and local listeners through the airwaves. Several on-air interviews were conducted with well-known artists on the station's hip hop shows and in-studio appearances were made by artists such as Little Brother and Rick Ross. In the summer of 2006, after approximately one year of being Station Manager, Rohit left the station for undisclosed reasons.

== Other projects ==
Rohit also works closely with Chicago emcee Twista and has been seen with the emcee at many of his Chicago appearances. Rohit has written many articles and has done detailed tour coverage for the popular midwest emcee as well. He likes to play doctor too...on the side, as a cardiologist.

== List of print publications written for ==
- Bumsquad Magazine
- Ozone Magazine
- WWS Magazine
- Insomniac Magazine
- Crunk Magazine
- New Power Magazine
- Hoodgrown Magazine

== List of online publications written for ==
- Allhiphop
- Off Tha Chain
- HipHopGame
- NobodySmiling
- I-Jonez
- DesiTorrents
