= Gujarat Chamber of Commerce & Industry =

Trade association in Gujarat, India

Gujarat Chamber of Commerce & Industry (GCCI)
- Founded: 1949
- Founder: Kasturbhai Lalbhai, Amritlal Hargovinddas
- Type: Trade association
- Headquarters: Ashram Road, Ahmedabad, Gujarat, India
- Key people: Rajeshbhai R. Gandhi; President Sandeep P. Engineer; Immediate Past President Jigish N. Doshi; Senior Vice President Hiten R. Vasant; Vice President Navroz H. Tarapore; Honorary Secretary Himanshu D. Patel; Honorary Secretary (Regional) Dhruvilbhai B. Patel; Honorary Treasurer
- Website: www.gujaratchamber.org

The Gujarat Chamber of Commerce & Industry (GCCI) is a non-profit trade association based in Ahmedabad, Gujarat, India, that represents businesses and industry associations across the state. It is registered as a society under the Societies Registration Act, 1860.

Rajesh Gandhi took charge as GCCI President for the 2026–27 term at the chamber's Annual General Meeting and Installation Ceremony, held at Karnavati Club, Ahmedabad, in the presence of Gujarat Chief Minister Bhupendra Patel, succeeding Sandeep P. Engineer.

== History ==
GCCI was founded in 1949 by industrialists Kasturbhai Lalbhai and Amritlal Hargovinddas, in the years following India's independence, with the stated aim of supporting the growth of trade and industry in Gujarat. The organisation is headquartered at the Gujarat Chamber Building on Ashram Road, Ahmedabad.

In July 2024, GCCI marked its 75th anniversary at its Annual General Meeting and installation ceremony. In April 2025, GCCI held the first edition of GATE (GCCI Annual Trade Expo), a business-to-business trade exhibition inaugurated by Gujarat Chief Minister Bhupendra Patel at Science City, Ahmedabad. A second edition was scheduled for April 2026 at the Helipad Exhibition Centre, Gandhinagar. In July 2026, Rajesh Gandhi was installed as president for the 2026–27 term, succeeding Sandeep P. Engineer.

== Membership ==
As of 2024, GCCI has over 7,500 direct members, including more than 200 Trade and Industry Associations, together said to represent approximately 2.5 lakh businesses across Gujarat. Membership categories include General Voting Members, Corporate Members, Patron Members, Lifetime Members, Non-Voting Members, and Business Association (Mahajan) Members, each with differing fee structures and voting rights.

== Affiliations ==
GCCI is affiliated with national trade bodies including the Federation of Indian Chambers of Commerce & Industry (FICCI), the Associated Chambers of Commerce and Industry of India (ASSOCHAM), the All India Organisation of Employers (AIOE), and the Indian National Committee of the International Chamber of Commerce (ICC). It also maintains links with more than 30 chambers of commerce internationally.

== Activities ==
GCCI operates sector-specific committees and maintains helpdesks for export-import (EXIM), MSME, and GST-related queries. It also runs an Alternate Dispute Resolution Centre offering mediation, conciliation, and arbitration services. GCCI produces a podcast series, Gujarat Udhyog Jagat Ni Charcha (GUJC), featuring interviews with business leaders.

== Office Bearers (2026–27) ==
Following the Annual General Meeting and Installation Ceremony held in late July 2026 at Karnavati Club, Ahmedabad, the following office bearers took charge for the 2026–27 term:

- President: Rajeshbhai R. Gandhi (Vadilal Enterprise Ltd.)
- Senior Vice President: Jigish N. Doshi (Vishakha Polyfab Pvt. Ltd.)
- Vice President: Hiten R. Vasant (Vasant Transport)
- Honorary Secretary: Navroz H. Tarapore (H. T. Engineers (Guj.) Pvt. Ltd.)
- Honorary Secretary (Regional): Himanshu D. Patel (Sainath Copy Centre)
- Honorary Treasurer: Dhruvilbhai B. Patel (BPC Projects & Infrastructure Pvt. Ltd.)
- Immediate Past President: Sandeep P. Engineer (Astral Limited)

The installation ceremony was attended by Gujarat Chief Minister Bhupendra Patel as chief guest, Ahmedabad Mayor Hiteshbhai Barot, MLA Amit Thaker, Additional Chief Secretary (Industries and Mines) Mamta Verma, and former GCCI presidents and executive committee members.

== Executive Committee (2026–27) ==
In addition to the office bearers above, the Executive Committee for 2026–27 comprises the following members:

Name	Organisation
CA (Dr.) Jainik N. Vakil	Nautam Vakil & Co.
Kavitaben Modi	Shree Kavita Corporation
Ajay D. Patel	Naroda Industries Association
Ajit N. Shah	Federation of Industries & Associations (Gujarat)
Ankit Patel	Unique Dyechem
Ashish H. Jhaveri	Ashish Jewellery Mart
Ashwinkumar S. Patel	Ahmedabad Engineering Mfg Association
Bharat M. Shah	Nandesari Industries Association
Bhargav K. Thakkar	Sharan Commodity
Bhavesh Lakhani	Shreenath Polyplast Pvt. Ltd.
Bhupendra C. Patel	Jembey Chem Limited
Chetan D. Shah	Veer Corporation
Chintanbhai D. Sheth	Maganlal Manilal Sheth
Dilipbhai M. Padhya	Amee Castor and Derivatives Ltd.
Gaurang Bhagat	Maskati Cloth Market Mahajan
Jayanti M. Sanghvi	Ratnamani Metals & Tubes Ltd.
Jigish K. Shah	Sanket Advertising
Kiran N. Patel	Bi Ki Dyes & Chemicals Pvt. Ltd.
Krishnaraj J. Lal	Shreeji Shipping Services Ltd.
Mahesh H. Puj	Mahesh Oil Industries
Manish P. Kiri	Kiri Industries Ltd.
Munjal M. Jaykrishna	Akshar Chem (India) Ltd.
Nilesh J. Shukla	Gujarat Hardware Industries
Nilesh R. Desai	Sanblue Tradelink Pvt. Ltd.
Parasbhai P. Desai	Gujarat Tea Processors & Packers Ltd.
Prashant K. Patel	Sayakha Industries Association
Rameshbhai M. Patel	Meghmani Organics Ltd.
Sachin K. Patel	Sachin Industries Ltd.
Sandip P. Shah	Prasan Fabrics
Sanjeev M. Chhajer	Peregrine Business Network Pvt. Ltd.
Saurin J. Parikh	S. Raja Export Pvt. Ltd.
Shailesh M. Patel	Santej Industrial Area Association
Shaishav R. Shah	GSEC Ltd.
Sudhanshu N. Mehta	Josler Hydrocarbons India Pvt. Ltd.
Trilok R. Parikh	Gulmohar Greens Golf & Country Club Ltd.
Meena R. Kaviya	Ayma Creation Pvt. Ltd.
Runalben Patel	Vaishali Agencies Pvt. Ltd.

== Regional Representatives (2026–27) ==
The Executive Committee also includes regional representatives nominated from Gujarat's district and city chambers of commerce:

Name	Regional Chamber
Ashok Jirawala	The Southern Gujarat Chamber of Commerce & Industry (Surat)
Bipendrasinh Jadeja	Jamnagar Chamber of Commerce & Industry
Dineshkumar J. Turakhia	Shri Zalawad Chamber of Commerce & Industry (Surendranagar)
Jalendu Pathak	Vadodara Chamber of Commerce & Industry
Jignesh H. Kariya	Porbandar Chamber of Commerce & Industry
Kirtikumar J. Patel	Coppercity Welfare Association (Visnagar Vepari Mahajan)
Sanjay N. Purohit	Junagadh Chamber of Commerce & Industry
Shivrambhai I. Patel	The Banaskantha District Chamber of Commerce & Industry
Teja S. Kangad	Gandhidham Chambers of Commerce & Industry
Tejas K. Sheth	Saurashtra Chamber of Commerce & Industry (Bhavnagar)
V. P. Vaishnav	Rajkot Chamber of Commerce and Industry
