= Adi Jambava =

Indian caste

The Adi Jambava are a leather artisan Indian caste in the states of Telangana, Karnataka, and Andhra Pradesh. This hilly mountain tribe worships Rama, Shiva, Krishna, Adi Parashakti, Shiva, Matangi and Maramma in remembrance of Jambavantha. They grow long beards and hair, wear ochre turbans, wear ashes and a horizontal shape on their foreheads known as Addagandha.

They are related to Madiga found in Telangana and Karnataka. They are referred to as Jambava samaj. The government of Karnataka launched a Separate Corporation Called Karnataka Adi Jambava Development Corporation for the uplift of the Adi Jambava community.
