= Bhambi =

Hindu Ethnic Minority

The Bhambi are a Hindu caste. Those from Gujarat are Chamar. Those found in the state of Maharashtra and Punjab in India. Bhambis from Punjab region, majority found in Amritsar, are Saraswat Punjabi Brahmin. Other ethnic groups are Bhambi Sindhi Mochi, Bhambi Rohit and Bhambi Khalpa.

== See also ==
- Brahmin
- Chamar
