= Bhambi Khalpa =

The Bhambi Khalpa are a caste found in the state of Gujarat in India. They are a sub-group within the Bhambi community. The Khalpa have scheduled caste status.They are not part of the Vedic "Hindu Varna System." They are following teaching of great saint " Satguru Ravidas or Rohidas."

== Origin ==
The name Khalpa has been derived from the Gujarati word khal, which means the carcass of a dead animal. They are said to be a sub-division of the Chamar community, which following the teachings of great visionary saint and social reformer "Satguru Ravidas or Rohitas". The Khalpa are a Gujarati-speaking community.

== Present circumstances ==
The Khalpa are an endogamous community, and practice clan exogamy. Historically, they used to intermarry with the Bhambi Rohit, but this has been discontinued. Their main clans are the Chauhan, Parmar, Katariya, Goel, Solanki and Kothari. Historically, the Khalpa were leather tanners and shoemakers, but like other artisan communities are abandoning their traditional occupation. Many are now employed as wage labourers. A small number are now small and medium-sized peasant cultivators.

== See also ==
- Bhambi Sindhi Mochi
- Bhambi Rohit
- Ravidassia
- Chamar
- Ramnami
- Arunthathiyar
- Madiga
- Haralayya
- Madara Chennaiah
- Satnami
- Chambhar
- Adi Jambava
- Jatav
- Chamar Regiment
- Ravived
- Mochi
