= Pavagada =

- Town
- Pavagada in Karnataka
- Coordinates: 14.10°N 77.28°E
- Country: India
- State: Karnataka
- District: Tumkur

Government
  - Body: Town Municipal Council

Area
  - Town: 6.57 km^{2} (2.54 sq mi)
  - Rural: 1,361.44 km^{2} (525.65 sq mi)
- Elevation: 846 m (2,776 ft)

Population (2011)
  - Town: 28,486
  - Density: 4,340/km^{2} (11,200/sq mi)
  - Rural: 216,708

Languages
  - Official: Kannada
- Time zone: UTC+5:30 (IST)
- PIN: 561202
- Telephone code: 08136
- Vehicle registration: KA-64
- Website: pavagadatown.mrc.gov.in

Pāvagada is a town and a taluk in the Tumkur district of Karnataka, India. Historically it was part of the Mysore kingdom. Though it is geographically connected to Chitradurga district inside state of Karnataka, it comes under Tumkur district. It is 157.8 km (98 miles) from state capital of Bengaluru. Uttara Pinakini river flows into this Taluk. Pavagada Taluk falls on the border of Karnataka, hence a majority of the population are bilingual speaking Kannada and Telugu. The town is famous for its fort located on the hill, Kote Anjaneya temple at the foothills and also the temple of Sri Shani Mahatma.

== Agriculture ==
Peanut was the main crop grown in various parts of the taluk but due to constant drought, people left their agricultural works and migrated to Bangalore and various other places for livelihood.

== Solar park ==
Pavagada Solar Park, world's fourth largest solar park 1st largest in Asia continent occupying 40 square kilometres (15 sq mi) near Thirumani village has the capacity to generate 2 gigawatts solar electricity.

== Geography ==
Pavagada is located at 14.1°N 77.27°E. It has an average elevation of 646 metres (2,119 feet). Due to it being surrounded by Andhra Pradesh, it was cut off from the Karnataka state during Samaikyandhra Movement due to road blockades.

=== Rainfall ===
Despite being a drought area, in the year 2022, Pavagada hoblis received 1,158 millimetres (45.6 in) of annual rainfall; whooping 89% (large excess) above normal rainfall.

== Demographics ==
Languages of Pavagada Taluk (2011)
1. Kannada (70.6%)
2. Telugu (21.2%)
3. Urdu (4.04%)
4. Hindi (3.84%)
5. others (0.30%)

As of 2011 India census, Pavagada had a population of 28,486, of which 14,299 are males while 14,187 are females as per report released by Census India 2011. Males constitute 52% of the population and females 51.50%. Pavagada has an average literacy rate of 81.33%: male literacy is 88.33%, and female literacy is 75.36%. In Pavagada, 10.65% of the population is under 6 years of age.

== Transportation ==
Pavagada is well-connected to other places in India. It has KSRTC & APSRTC buses which connect to other places of Karnataka and neighbouring Andhra Pradesh. There is a railway station being built in Pavagada under the project of Rayadurga - Tumkur Railway Line. This railway will connect Pavgada to Bengaluru to Bellary via Tumkur, Madhugiri and Rayadurga.

== Notable people ==
- Sulagitti Narasamma – an Indian traditional midwife, known for delivering 15,000 babies.
- Rangayana Raghu – actor in Kannada films and theatre
- V. S. Ugrappa – politician
